= Mochilki =

Mochilki Мочилки
- Village
- Location within Bashkortostan Location within Russia
- Coordinates: 54°04′N 54°23′E
- Country: Russia
- Region: Bashkortostan
- District: Belebeyevsky District
- Time zone: UTC+5:00

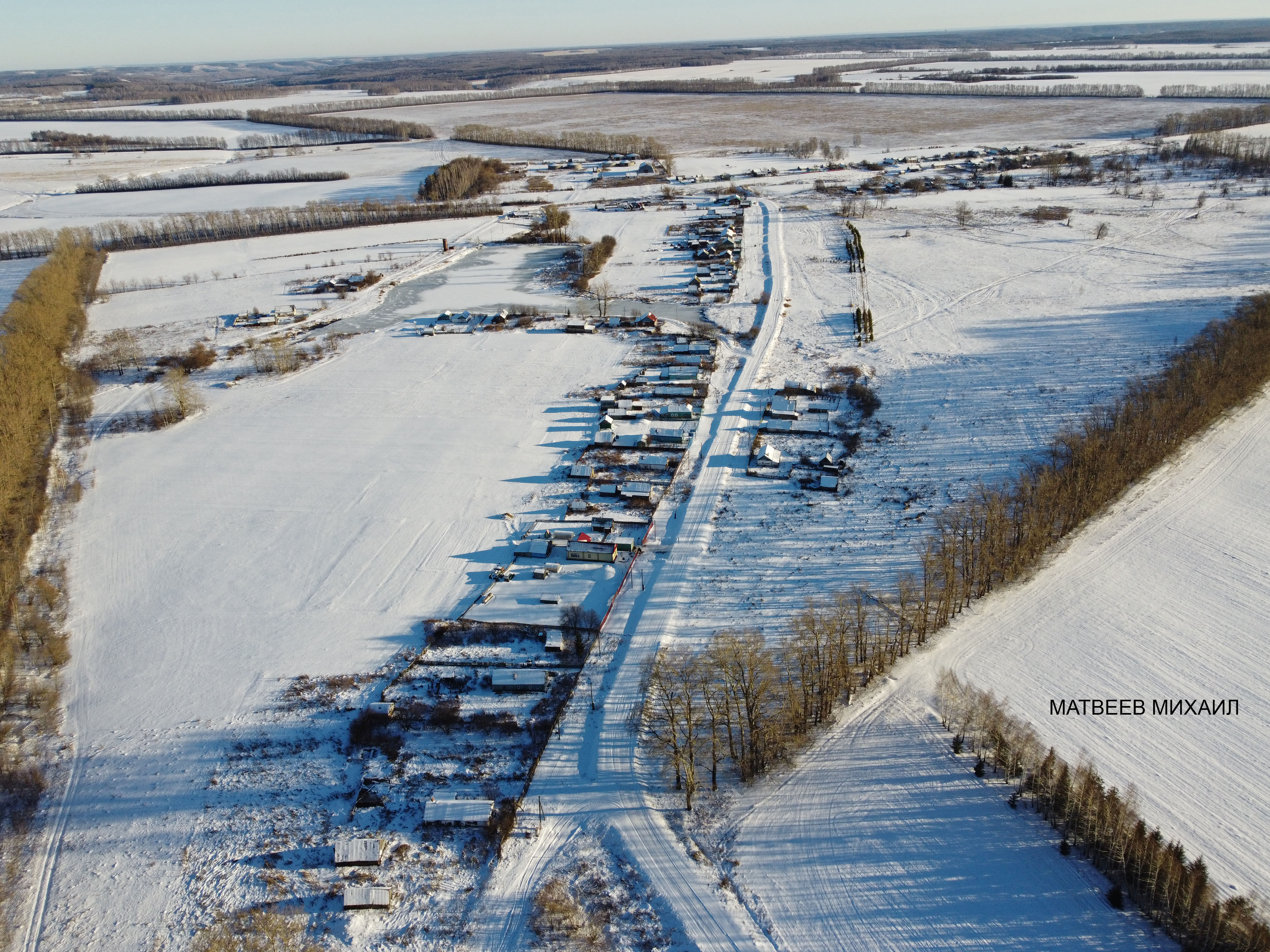
Мочилки

Mochilki (Russian: Мочилки) is a rural locality (a village) in Znamensky Selsoviet, Belebeyevsky District, Bashkortostan, Russia. It had a population of 113 as of 2010. There are 4 streets.

== Geography ==
Mochilki is located 34 km east of Belebey (the district's administrative centre) by road. Znamenka is the nearest rural locality.
