= Pyzhyanovsky =

Pyzhyanovsky Пыжьяновский
- Village
- Location within Bashkortostan Location within Russia
- Coordinates: 54°16′N 54°29′E
- Country: Russia
- Region: Bashkortostan
- District: Belebeyevsky District
- Time zone: UTC+5:00

Pyzhyanovsky (Russian: Пыжьяновский) is a rural locality (a village) in Usen-Ivanovsky Selsoviet, Belebeyevsky District, Bashkortostan, Russia. The population was 3 as of 2010. There is 1 street.

== Geography ==
Pyzhyanovsky is located 59 km northeast of Belebey (the district's administrative centre) by road. Burangulovo is the nearest rural locality.
