= Derevnya razyezda Maksyutovo =

Derevnya razyezda Maksyutovo Деревня разъезда Максютово
- Village
- Location within Bashkortostan Location within Russia
- Coordinates: 54°02′N 54°18′E
- Country: Russia
- Region: Bashkortostan
- District: Belebeyevsky District
- Time zone: UTC+5:00

Derevnya razyezda Maksyutovo (Russian: Деревня разъезда Максютово; Bashkir: Мәҡсүт разъезы, Mäqsüt razyezı) is a rural locality (a village) in Donskoy Selsoviet, Belebeyevsky District, Bashkortostan, Russia. The population was 20 as of 2010. There is 1 street.

== Geography ==
The village is located 19 km southeast of Belebey (the district's administrative centre) by road. Pakhar is the nearest rural locality.
