= Akbasar =

Akbasar Акбасар
- Village
- Location within Bashkortostan Location within Russia
- Coordinates: 54°18′N 54°10′E
- Country: Russia
- Region: Bashkortostan
- District: Belebeyevsky District
- Time zone: UTC+5:00

Akbasar (Russian: Акбасар; Bashkir: Аҡбаҫар, Aqbaśar) is a rural locality (a village) in Metevbashevsky Selsoviet, Belebeyevsky District, Bashkortostan, Russia. The population was 149 as of 2010. There is 1 street.

== Geography ==
Akbasar is located 29 km north of Belebey (the district's administrative centre) by road. Metevbash is the nearest rural locality.
