= Yermolkino =

Yermolkino Ермолкино
- Selo
- Location within Bashkortostan Location within Russia
- Coordinates: 54°11′N 53°54′E
- Country: Russia
- Region: Bashkortostan
- District: Belebeyevsky District
- Time zone: UTC+5:00

Yermolkino (Russian: Ермолкино) is a rural locality (a selo) and the administrative centre of Yermolkinsky Selsoviet, Belebeyevsky District, Bashkortostan, Russia. The population was 625 as of 2010. There are 5 streets.

== Geography ==
Yermolkino is located 18 km northwest of Belebey (the district's administrative centre) by road. Adelkino is the nearest rural locality.
