= Kluchevka =

Kluchevka Ключевка
- Village
- Location within Bashkortostan Location within Russia
- Coordinates: 54°19′N 54°17′E
- Country: Russia
- Region: Bashkortostan
- District: Belebeyevsky District
- Time zone: UTC+5:00

Kluchevka (Russian: Ключевка) is a rural locality (a village) in Semenkinsky Selsoviet, Belebeyevsky District, Bashkortostan, Russia. The population was 21 as of 2010. There are 2 streets.

== Geography ==
Kluchevka is located 32 km northeast of Belebey (the district's administrative centre) by road. Gusarkino is the nearest rural locality.
