= Svetlovka =

Svetlovka Светловка
- Village
- Location within Bashkortostan Location within Russia
- Coordinates: 54°05′N 54°04′E
- Country: Russia
- Region: Bashkortostan
- District: Belebeyevsky District
- Time zone: UTC+5:00

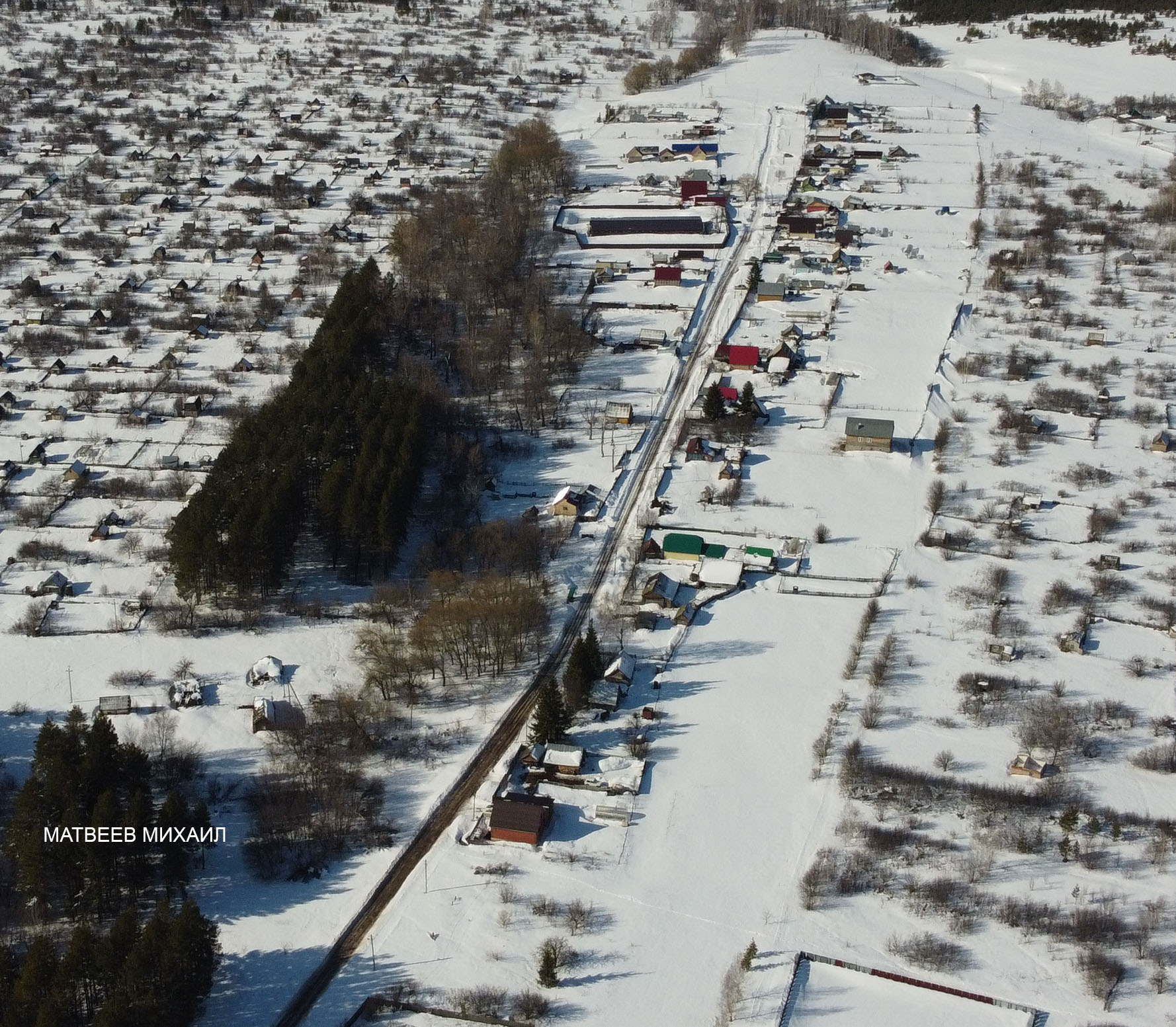
Svetlovka from above

Svetlovka (Russian: Светловка) is a rural locality (a village) in Rassvetovsky Selsoviet, Belebeyevsky District, Bashkortostan, Russia. The population was 38 as of 2010. There is 1 street.

== Geography ==
Svetlovka is located 5 km southwest of Belebey (the district's administrative centre) by road. Belebey is the nearest rural locality.
