= Baymurzino, Belebeyevsky District, Bashkortostan =

Baymurzino Баймурзино
- Village
- Location within Bashkortostan Location within Russia
- Coordinates: 54°09′N 53°53′E
- Country: Russia
- Region: Bashkortostan
- District: Belebeyevsky District
- Time zone: UTC+5:00

Baymurzino (Russian: Баймурзино; Bashkir: Баймырҙа, Baymırźa) is a rural locality (a village) in Yermolkinsky Selsoviet, Belebeyevsky District, Bashkortostan, Russia. The population was 409 as of 2010. There are 4 streets.

== Geography ==
Baymurzino is located 21 km northwest of Belebey (the district's administrative centre) by road. Yermolkino is the nearest rural locality.
