= Novosarayevo =

Novosarayevo Новосараево
- Village
- Location within Bashkortostan Location within Russia
- Coordinates: 54°04′N 54°26′E
- Country: Russia
- Region: Bashkortostan
- District: Belebeyevsky District
- Time zone: UTC+5:00

Novosarayevo (Russian: Новосараево; Bashkir: Яңы Һарай, Yañı Haray) is a rural locality (a village) in Znamensky Selsoviet, Belebeyevsky District, Bashkortostan, Russia. The population was 237 as of 2010. There are 7 streets.

== Geography ==
Novosarayevo is located 43 km east of Belebey (the district's administrative centre) by road. Berezovka is the nearest rural locality.
