= Metevbash =

Metevbash Метевбаш
- Selo
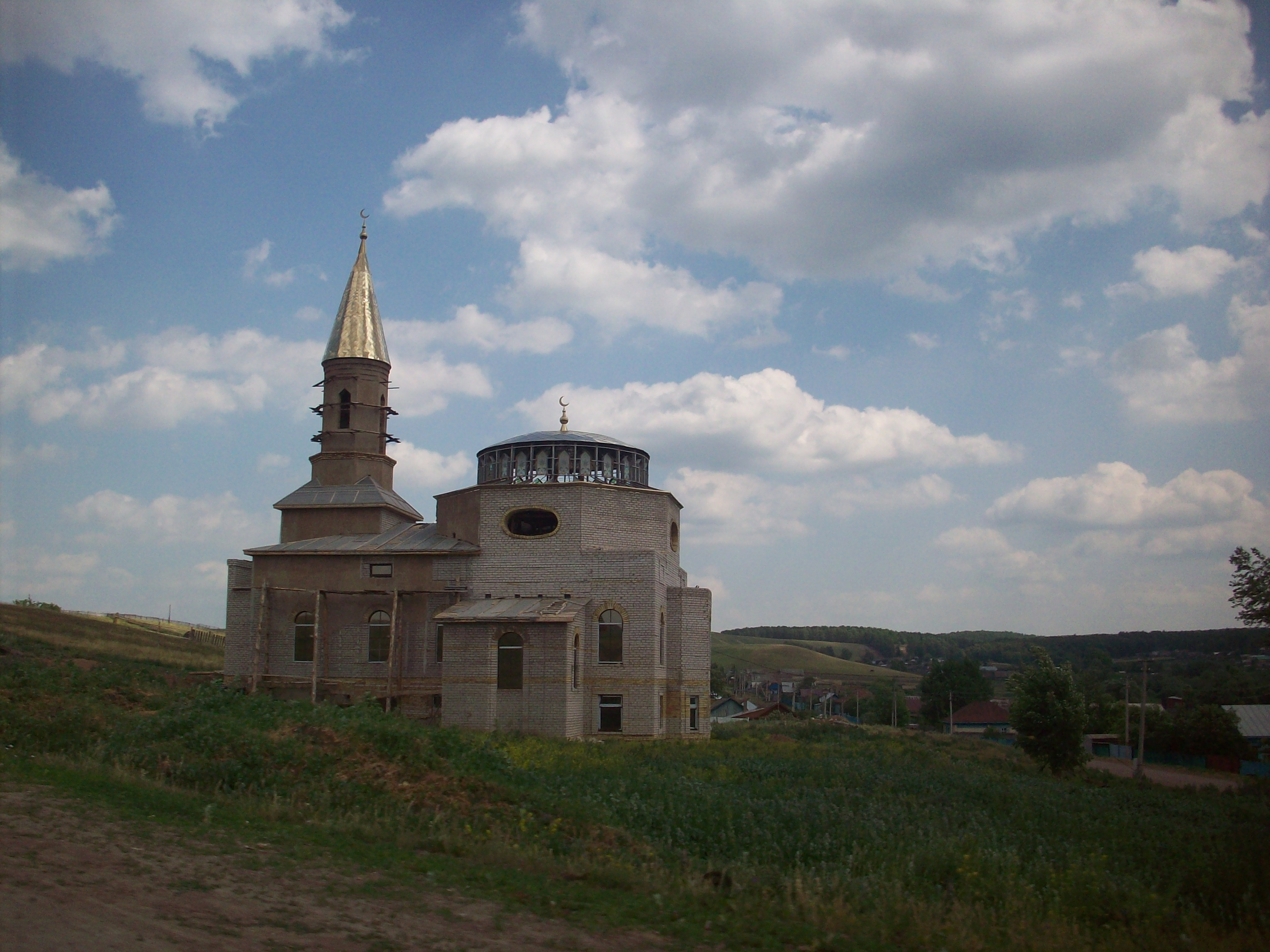

- Location within Bashkortostan Location within Russia
- Coordinates: 54°17′N 54°14′E
- Country: Russia
- Region: Bashkortostan
- District: Belebeyevsky District
- Time zone: UTC+5:00

Metevbash (Russian: Метевбаш; Bashkir: Мәтәүбаш, Mätäwbaş) is a rural locality (a selo) and the administrative centre of Metevbashevsky Selsoviet, Belebeyevsky District, Bashkortostan, Russia. The population was 789 as of 2010. There are 5 streets.

== Geography ==
Metevbash is located 26 km north of Belebey (the district's administrative centre) by road. Akkain is the nearest rural locality.
