= Derevnya razyezda Ryabash =

Derevnya razyezda Ryabash Деревня разъезда Рябаш
- Village
- Location within Bashkortostan Location within Russia
- Coordinates: 53°57′N 54°02′E
- Country: Russia
- Region: Bashkortostan
- District: Belebeyevsky District
- Time zone: UTC+5:00

Derevnya razyezda Ryabash (Russian: Деревня разъезда Рябаш; Bashkir: Рәбаш разъезы, Räbaş razyezı) is a rural locality (a village) in Malinovsky Selsoviet, Belebeyevsky District, Bashkortostan, Russia. The population was 47 in 2010. There is one street.

== Geography ==
The village is located 23 km southwest of Belebey (the district's administrative centre) by road. Yekaterinovka is the nearest rural locality.
