= Verkhneyermolgi =

Verkhneyermolgi Верхнеермолги
- Village
- Location within Bashkortostan Location within Russia
- Coordinates: 54°11′N 53°58′E
- Country: Russia
- Region: Bashkortostan
- District: Belebeyevsky District
- Time zone: UTC+5:00

Verkhneyermolgi (Russian: Верхнеермолги; Bashkir: Үрге Ермолги, Ürge Yermolgi) is a rural locality (a village) in Yermolkinsky Selsoviet, Belebeyevsky District, Bashkortostan, Russia. The population was 10 as of 2010. There are 2 streets.

== Geography ==
Verkhneyermolgi is located 31 km northwest of Belebey (the district's administrative centre) by road. Adelkino is the nearest rural locality.
