= Kain-Yelga =

Kain-Yelga Каин-Елга
- Village
- Location within Bashkortostan Location within Russia
- Coordinates: 54°13′N 54°09′E
- Country: Russia
- Region: Bashkortostan
- District: Belebeyevsky District
- Time zone: UTC+5:00

Kain-Yelga (Russian: Каин-Елга; Bashkir: Ҡайынйылға, Qayınyılğa) is a rural locality (a village) in Tuzlukushevsky Selsoviet, Belebeyevsky District, Bashkortostan, Russia. The population was 91 as of 2010. There are 4 streets.

== Geography ==
Kain-Yelga is located 17 km north of Belebey (the district's administrative centre) by road. Kush-Yelga is the nearest rural locality.
