= Kanash, Belebeyevsky District, Republic of Bashkortostan =

Kanash Канаш
- Village
- Location within Bashkortostan Location within Russia
- Coordinates: 53°57′N 54°27′E
- Country: Russia
- Region: Bashkortostan
- District: Belebeyevsky District
- Time zone: UTC+5:00

Kanash (Russian: Канаш; Bashkir: Канаш, Kanaş) is a rural locality (a village) in Slakbashevsky Selsoviet, Belebeyevsky District, Bashkortostan, Russia. The population was 44 as of 2010. There is 1 street.

== Geography ==
Kanash is located 36 km southeast of Belebey (the district's administrative centre) by road. Krasnoyar is the nearest rural locality.
