= Selo sanatoriya Glukhovskogo =

Selo sanatoriya Glukhovskogo Село санатория Глуховского
- Selo
- Location within Bashkortostan Location within Russia
- Coordinates: 53°59′N 54°20′E
- Country: Russia
- Region: Bashkortostan
- District: Belebeyevsky District
- Time zone: UTC+5:00

Selo sanatoriya Glukhovskogo (Russian: Село санатория Глуховского) is a rural locality (a selo) in Maxim-Gorkovsky Selsoviet, Belebeyevsky District, Bashkortostan, Russia. The population was 657 as of 2010. There are 8 streets.

== Geography ==
It is located 25 km southeast of Belebey (the district's administrative centre) by road. Russkaya Shveytsariya is the nearest rural locality.
