= Skobelevka, Belebeyevsky District, Republic of Bashkortostan =

Skobelevka Скобелевка
- Village
- Location within Bashkortostan Location within Russia
- Coordinates: 53°59′N 54°05′E
- Country: Russia
- Region: Bashkortostan
- District: Belebeyevsky District
- Time zone: UTC+5:00

Skobelevka (Russian: Скобелевка) is a rural locality (a village) in Malinovsky Selsoviet, Belebeyevsky District, Bashkortostan, Russia. The population was 114 as of 2010. There are 5 streets.

== Geography ==
Skobelevka is located 16 km south of Belebey (the district's administrative centre) by road. Malinovka is the nearest rural locality.
