= Tuzlukush =

Tuzlukush Тузлукуш
- Selo
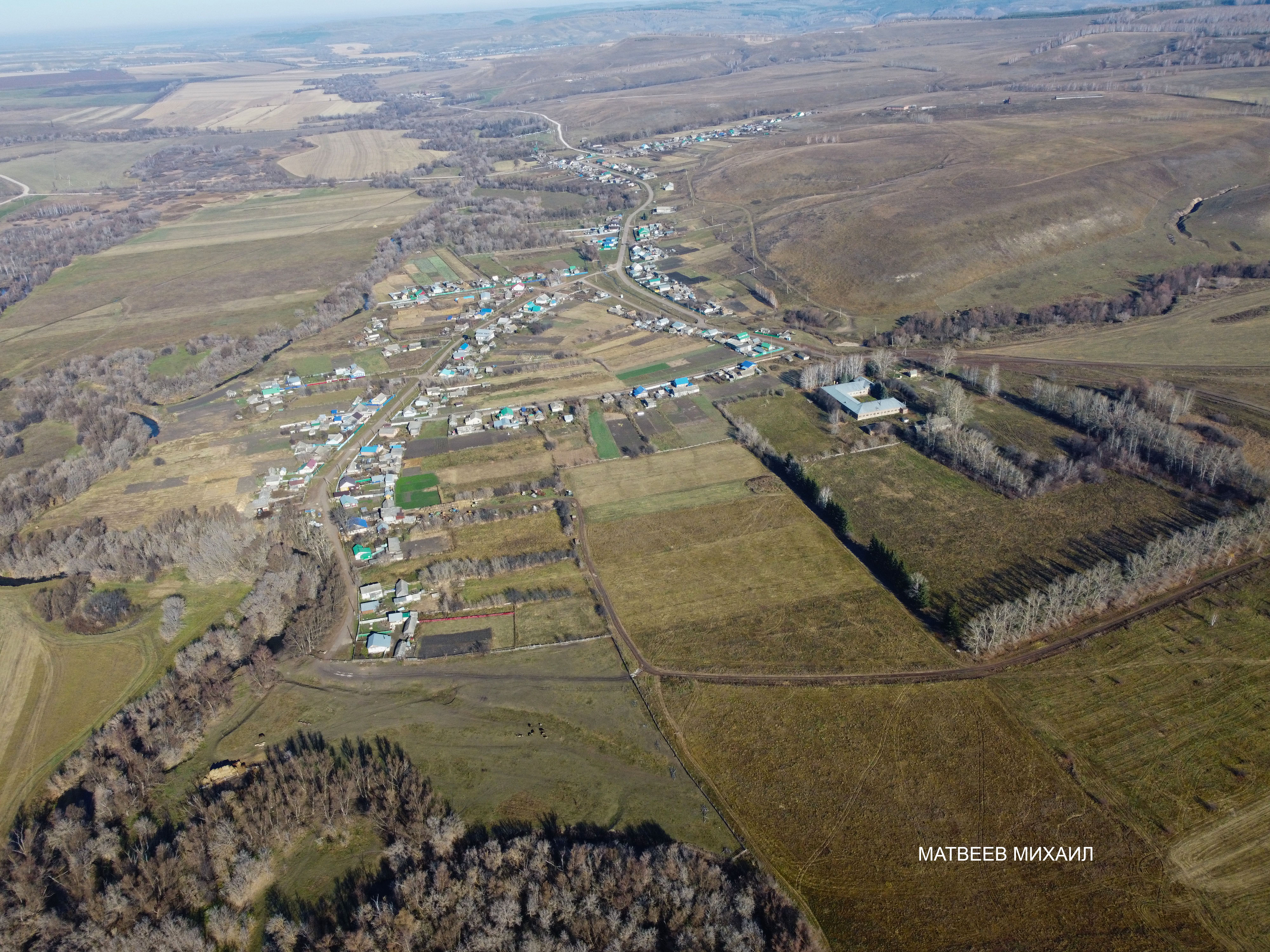

- Location within Bashkortostan Location within Russia
- Coordinates: 54°15′N 54°07′E
- Country: Russia
- Region: Bashkortostan
- District: Belebeyevsky District
- Time zone: UTC+5:00

Tuzlukush (Russian: Тузлукуш; Bashkir: Туҙлыҡыуыш, Tuźlıqıwış) is a rural locality (a selo) and the administrative centre of Tuzlukushevsky Selsoviet, Belebeyevsky District, Bashkortostan, Russia. The population was 335 as of 2010. There are 5 streets.

== Geography ==
Tuzlukush is located 24 km north of Belebey (the district's administrative centre) by road. Bayrak is the nearest rural locality.
