= Gusarkino =

Gusarkino Гусаркино
- Village
- Location within Bashkortostan Location within Russia
- Coordinates: 54°18′N 54°19′E
- Country: Russia
- Region: Bashkortostan
- District: Belebeyevsky District
- Time zone: UTC+5:00

Gusarkino (Russian: Гусаркино) is a rural locality (a village) in Semenkinsky Selsoviet, Belebeyevsky District, Bashkortostan, Russia. The population was 44 as of 2010. There are 3 streets.

== Geography ==
Gusarkino is located 34 km northeast of Belebey (the district's administrative centre) by road. Starosemenkino is the nearest rural locality.
