= Ilkino =

Ilkino Илькино
- Village
- Location within Bashkortostan Location within Russia
- Coordinates: 54°11′N 54°04′E
- Country: Russia
- Region: Bashkortostan
- District: Belebeyevsky District
- Time zone: UTC+5:00

Ilkino (Russian: Илькино) is a rural locality (a village) in Annovsky Selsoviet, Belebeyevsky District, Bashkortostan, Russia. The population was 417 as of 2010. There are 3 streets.

== Geography ==
Ilkino is located 11 km north of Belebey (the district's administrative centre) by road. Ismagilovo is the nearest rural locality.
