= Cheganly =

Cheganly Чеганлы
- Village
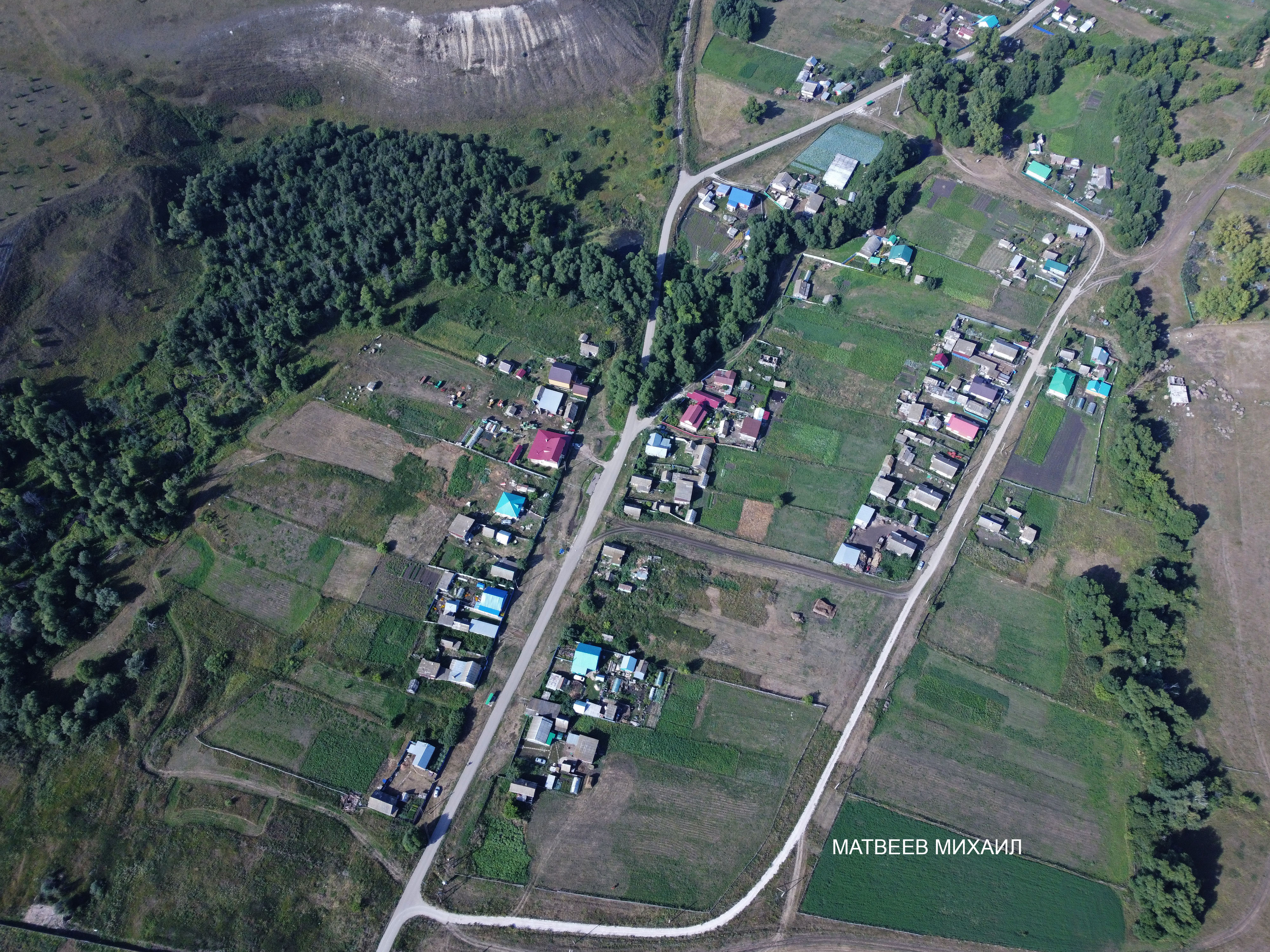

- Location within Bashkortostan Location within Russia
- Coordinates: 54°15′N 54°04′E
- Country: Russia
- Region: Bashkortostan
- District: Belebeyevsky District
- Time zone: UTC+5:00

Cheganly (Russian: Чеганлы; Bashkir: Сағанлы, Sağanlı) is a rural locality (a village) in Annovsky Selsoviet, Belebeyevsky District, Bashkortostan, Russia. The population was 148 as of 2010. There are 3 streets.

== Geography ==
Cheganly is located 18 km north of Belebey (the district's administrative centre) by road. Annovka is the nearest rural locality.
