= Uteyka =

Uteyka Утейка
- Village
- Location within Bashkortostan Location within Russia
- Coordinates: 53°58′N 54°19′E
- Country: Russia
- Region: Bashkortostan
- District: Belebeyevsky District
- Time zone: UTC+5:00

Uteyka (Russian: Утейка; Bashkir: Үтәй, Ütäy) is a rural locality (a village) in Maxim-Gorkovsky Selsoviet, Belebeyevsky District, Bashkortostan, Russia. The population was 86 as of 2010. There are 2 streets.

== Geography ==
Uteyka is located 26 km southeast of Belebey (the district's administrative centre) by road. Sarmandeyevka is the nearest rural locality.
