= Shelkanovo =

Shelkanovo Шелканово
- Village
- Location within Bashkortostan Location within Russia
- Coordinates: 53°57′N 54°13′E
- Country: Russia
- Region: Bashkortostan
- District: Belebeyevsky District
- Time zone: UTC+5:00

Shelkanovo (Russian: Шелканово; Bashkir: Шалҡан, Şalqan) is a rural locality (a village) in Malinovsky Selsoviet, Belebeyevsky District, Bashkortostan, Russia. The population was 11 as of 2010. There are 2 streets.

== Geography ==
Shelkanovo is located 19 km south of Belebey (the district's administrative centre) by road. Maly Meneuz is the nearest rural locality.
