= Kum-Kosyak =

Kum-Kosyak Кум-Косяк
- Village
- Location within Bashkortostan Location within Russia
- Coordinates: 54°01′N 54°11′E
- Country: Russia
- Region: Bashkortostan
- District: Belebeyevsky District
- Time zone: UTC+5:00

Kum-Kosyak (Russian: Кум-Косяк; Bashkir: Ҡом-Косяк, Qom-Kosyak) is a rural locality (a village) in Malinovsky Selsoviet, Belebeyevsky District, Bashkortostan, Russia. The population was 41 as of 2010. There are 2 streets.

== Geography ==
Kum-Kosyak is located 13 km southeast of Belebey (the district's administrative centre) by road. Aksakovo is the nearest rural locality.
