= Ismagilovo, Belebeyevsky District, Republic of Bashkortostan =

Ismagilovo Исмагилово
- Village
- Location within Bashkortostan Location within Russia
- Coordinates: 54°11′N 54°08′E
- Country: Russia
- Region: Bashkortostan
- District: Belebeyevsky District
- Time zone: UTC+5:00

Ismagilovo (Russian: Исмагилово; Bashkir: Исмәғил, İsmäğil) is a rural locality (a village) in Tuzlukushevsky Selsoviet, Belebeyevsky District, Bashkortostan, Russia. The population was 105 as of 2010. There are 3 streets.

== Geography ==
Ismagilovo is located 12 km north of Belebey (the district's administrative centre) by road. Repyevka is the nearest rural locality.
