= Selo Tsentralnoy usadby plemzavoda imeni Maxima Gorkogo =

Selo Tsentralnoy usadby plemzavoda imeni Maxima Gorkogo Село Центральной усадьбы племзавода имени Максима Горького
- Selo
- Location within Bashkortostan Location within Russia
- Coordinates: 54°00′N 54°18′E
- Country: Russia
- Region: Bashkortostan
- District: Belebeyevsky District
- Time zone: UTC+5:00

Selo Tsentralnoy usadby plemzavoda imeni Maxima Gorkogo (Russian: Село Центральной усадьбы племзавода имени Максима Горького; Bashkir: Максим Горький исемендәге тоҡомсолоҡ заводының Үҙәк усадьбаһы, Maksim Gorkiy isemendäge toqomsoloq zavodınıñ Üźäk usadbahı) is a rural locality (a selo) and the administrative centre of Maxim-Gorkovsky Selsoviet, Belebeyevsky District, Bashkortostan, Russia. The population was 993 as of 2010. There are 16 streets.

== Geography ==
It is located 21 km southeast of Belebey (the district's administrative centre) by road. Russkaya Shveytsariya is the nearest rural locality.
