= Kazanlytamak =

Kazanlytamak Казанлытамак
- Village
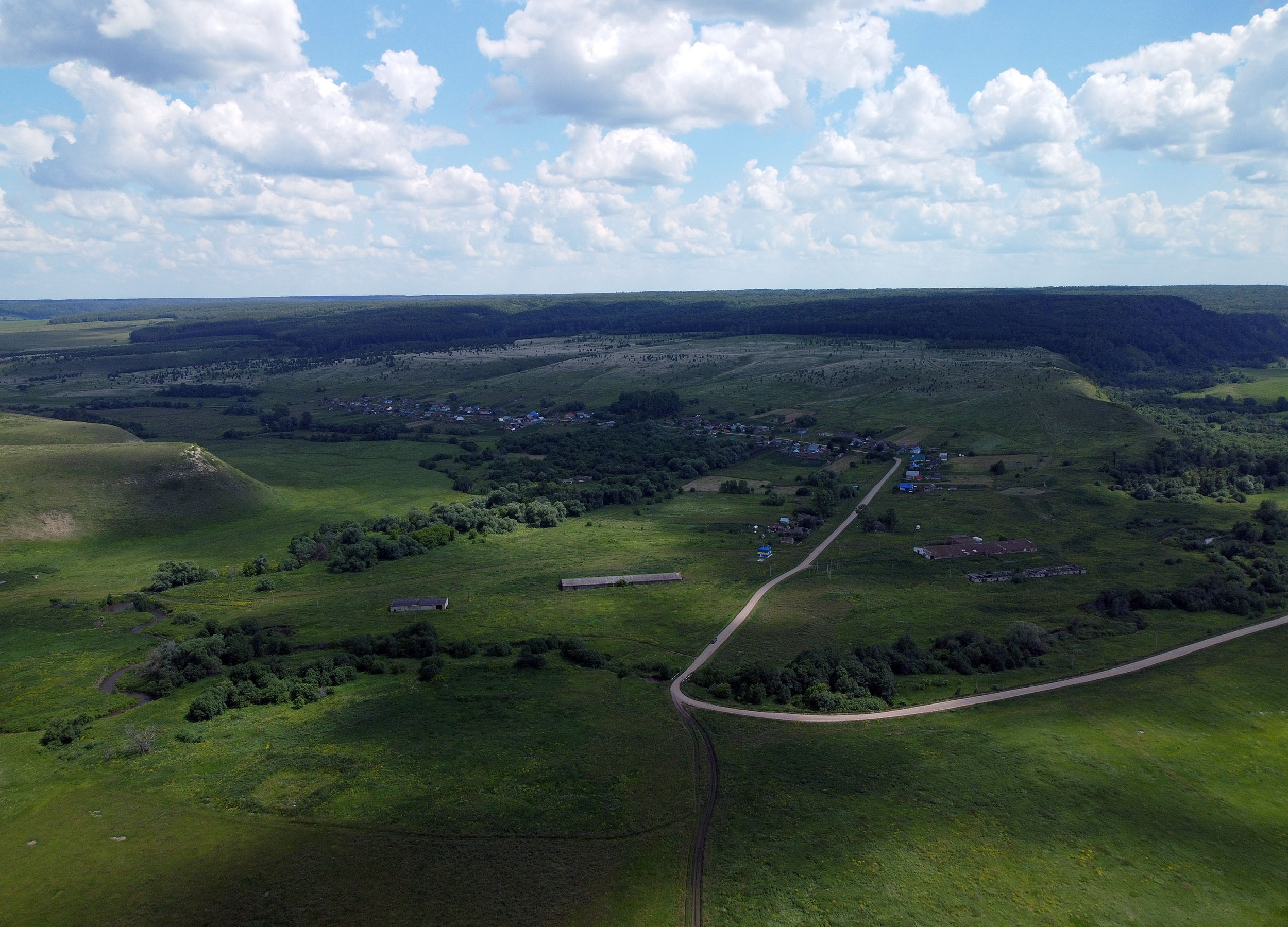
- A birdseye view of Kazanlytamak and it's surroundings

- Location within Bashkortostan Location within Russia
- Coordinates: 54°05′N 54°18′E
- Country: Russia
- Region: Bashkortostan
- District: Belebeyevsky District
- Time zone: UTC+5:00

Kazanlytamak (Russian: Казанлытамак; Bashkir: Ҡаҙанлытамаҡ, Qaźanlıtamaq) is a rural locality (a village) in Donskoy Selsoviet, Belebeyevsky District, Bashkortostan, Russia. The population was 133 as of 2010. There is 1 street.

== Geography ==
Kazanlytamak is located 24 km east of Belebey (the district's administrative centre) by road. Mezhdugornoye is the nearest rural locality.
