= Starosemenkino =

Starosemenkino Старосеменкино
- Selo
- Location within Bashkortostan Location within Russia
- Coordinates: 54°20′N 54°17′E
- Country: Russia
- Region: Bashkortostan
- District: Belebeyevsky District
- Time zone: UTC+5:00

Starosemenkino (Russian: Старосеменкино) is a rural locality (a selo) and the administrative centre of Semenkinsky Selsoviet, Belebeyevsky District, Bashkortostan, Russia. The population was 437 as of 2010. There are 8 streets.

== Geography ==
Starosemenkino is located 32 km northeast of Belebey (the district's administrative centre) by road. Karanay is the nearest rural locality.
