= Ik-Vershina =

Ik-Vershina Ик-Вершина
- Village
- Location within Bashkortostan Location within Russia
- Coordinates: 53°57′N 54°05′E
- Country: Russia
- Region: Bashkortostan
- District: Belebeyevsky District
- Time zone: UTC+5:00

Ik-Vershina (Russian: Ик-Вершина; Bashkir: Ыҡ-Вершина, Iq-Verşina) is a rural locality (a village) in Malinovsky Selsoviet, Belebeyevsky District, Bashkortostan, Russia. The population was 18 as of 2010. There is 1 street.

== Geography ==
Ik-Vershina is located 22 km south of Belebey (the district's administrative centre) by road. Fyodorovka is the nearest rural locality.
