= Parafeyevka =

Parafeyevka Парафеевка
- Village
- Location within Bashkortostan Location within Russia
- Coordinates: 54°00′N 54°03′E
- Country: Russia
- Region: Bashkortostan
- District: Belebeyevsky District
- Time zone: UTC+5:00

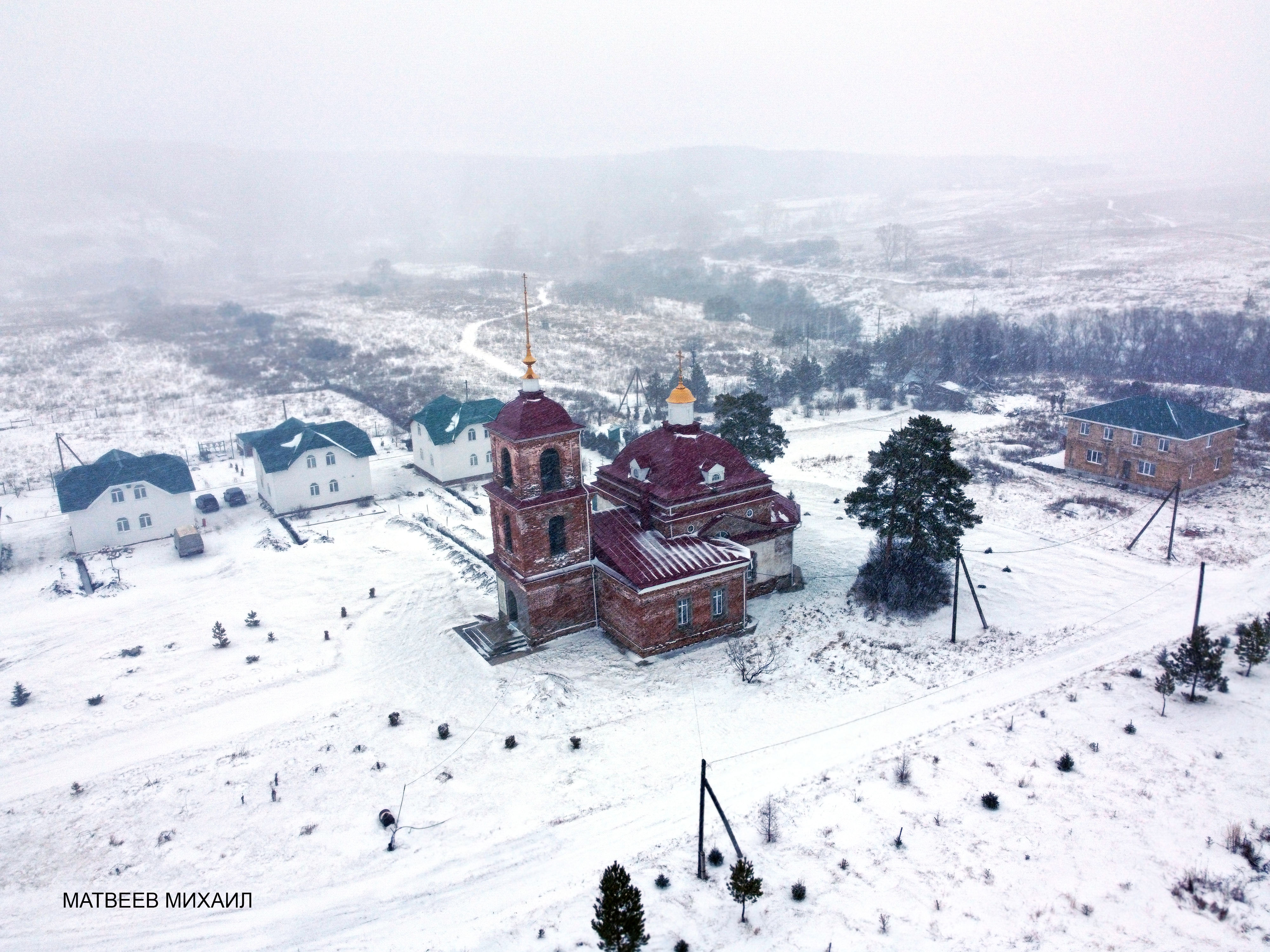
Parafeyevka church

Parafeyevka (Russian: Парафеевка) is a rural locality (a village) in Malinovsky Selsoviet, Belebeyevsky District, Bashkortostan, Russia. The population was 40 as of 2010. There are four streets.

== Geography ==
Parafeyevka is located 16 km south of Belebey (the district's administrative centre) by road. Malinovka is the nearest rural locality.
