= Martynovo =

Martynovo Мартыново
- Village
- Location within Bashkortostan Location within Russia
- Coordinates: 53°59′N 53°57′E
- Country: Russia
- Region: Bashkortostan
- District: Belebeyevsky District
- Time zone: UTC+5:00

Martynovo (Russian: Мартыново) is a rural locality (a village) in Bazhenovsky Selsoviet, Belebeyevsky District, Bashkortostan, Russia. The population was 21 as of 2010. There is 1 street.

== Geography ==
Martynovo is located 18 km southwest of Belebey (the district's administrative centre) by road. Bazhenovo is the nearest rural locality.
