= Fyodorovka, Belebeyevsky District, Republic of Bashkortostan =

Fyodorovka Фёдоровка
- Village
- Location within Bashkortostan Location within Russia
- Coordinates: 53°56′N 54°04′E
- Country: Russia
- Region: Bashkortostan
- District: Belebeyevsky District
- Time zone: UTC+5:00

Fyodorovka (Russian: Фёдоровка) is a rural locality (a village) in Malinovsky Selsoviet, Belebeyevsky District, Bashkortostan, Russia. The population was 3 as of 2010. There is 1 street.

== Geography ==
Fyodorovka is located 23 km south of Belebey (the district's administrative centre) by road. Ik-Vershina is the nearest rural locality.
