= Novokazanka =

Novokazanka Новоказанка
- Village
- Location within Bashkortostan Location within Russia
- Coordinates: 54°05′N 54°25′E
- Country: Russia
- Region: Bashkortostan
- District: Belebeyevsky District
- Time zone: UTC+5:00

Novokazanka (Russian: Новоказанка) is a rural locality (a village) in Znamensky Selsoviet, Belebeyevsky District, Bashkortostan, Russia. The population was 52 as of 2010. There is 1 street.

== Geography ==
Novokazanka is located 40 km east of Belebey (the district's administrative centre) by road. Novosarayevo is the nearest rural locality.
