= Kush-Yelga =

Kush-Yelga Куш-Елга
- Village
- Location within Bashkortostan Location within Russia
- Coordinates: 54°13′N 54°07′E
- Country: Russia
- Region: Bashkortostan
- District: Belebeyevsky District
- Time zone: UTC+5:00

An image of Kush-Yelga from above.

Kush-Yelga (Russian: Куш-Елга; Bashkir: Ҡушйылға, Quşyılğa) is a rural locality (a village) in Tuzlukushevsky Selsoviet, Belebeyevsky District, Bashkortostan, Russia. The population was 37 as of 2010. There is 1 street.

== Geography ==
Kush-Yelga is located 16 km north of Belebey (the district's administrative centre) by road. Kain-Yelga is the nearest rural locality.
