= Azekeyevo =

Azekeyevo Азекеево
- Village
- Location within Bashkortostan Location within Russia
- Coordinates: 54°16′N 54°07′E
- Country: Russia
- Region: Bashkortostan
- District: Belebeyevsky District
- Time zone: UTC+5:00

Azekeyevo (Russian: Азекеево; Bashkir: Әзекәй, Äzekäy) is a rural locality (a village) in Tuzlukushevsky Selsoviet, Belebeyevsky District, Bashkortostan, Russia. The population was 15 as of 2010. There is 1 street.

== Geography ==
Azekeyevo is located 25 km north of Belebey (the district's administrative centre) by road. Tuzlukush is the nearest rural locality.
