= Brik-Alga =

Brik-Alga Брик-Алга
- Village
- Location within Bashkortostan Location within Russia
- Coordinates: 54°00′N 54°09′E
- Country: Russia
- Region: Bashkortostan
- District: Belebeyevsky District
- Time zone: UTC+5:00

Brik-Alga (Russian: Брик-Алга; Bashkir: Берек-Алға, Berek-Alğa) is a rural locality (a village) in Malinovsky Selsoviet, Belebeyevsky District, Bashkortostan, Russia. The population was 50 as of 2010. There is 1 street.

== Geography ==
Brik-Alga is located 14 km south of Belebey (the district's administrative centre) by road. Aksakovo is the nearest rural locality.
