= Novosemenkino =

Novosemenkino Новосеменкино
- Selo
- Location within Bashkortostan Location within Russia
- Coordinates: 54°23′N 54°18′E
- Country: Russia
- Region: Bashkortostan
- District: Belebeyevsky District
- Time zone: UTC+5:00

Novosemenkino (Russian: Новосеменкино) is a rural locality (a selo) in Semenkinsky Selsoviet, Belebeyevsky District, Bashkortostan, Russia. The population was 295 as of 2010. There are 7 streets.

== Geography ==
Novosemenkino is located 38 km north of Belebey (the district's administrative centre) by road. Imyan-Kuper is the nearest rural locality.
