= Pakhar, Republic of Bashkortostan =

Pakhar Пахарь
- Village
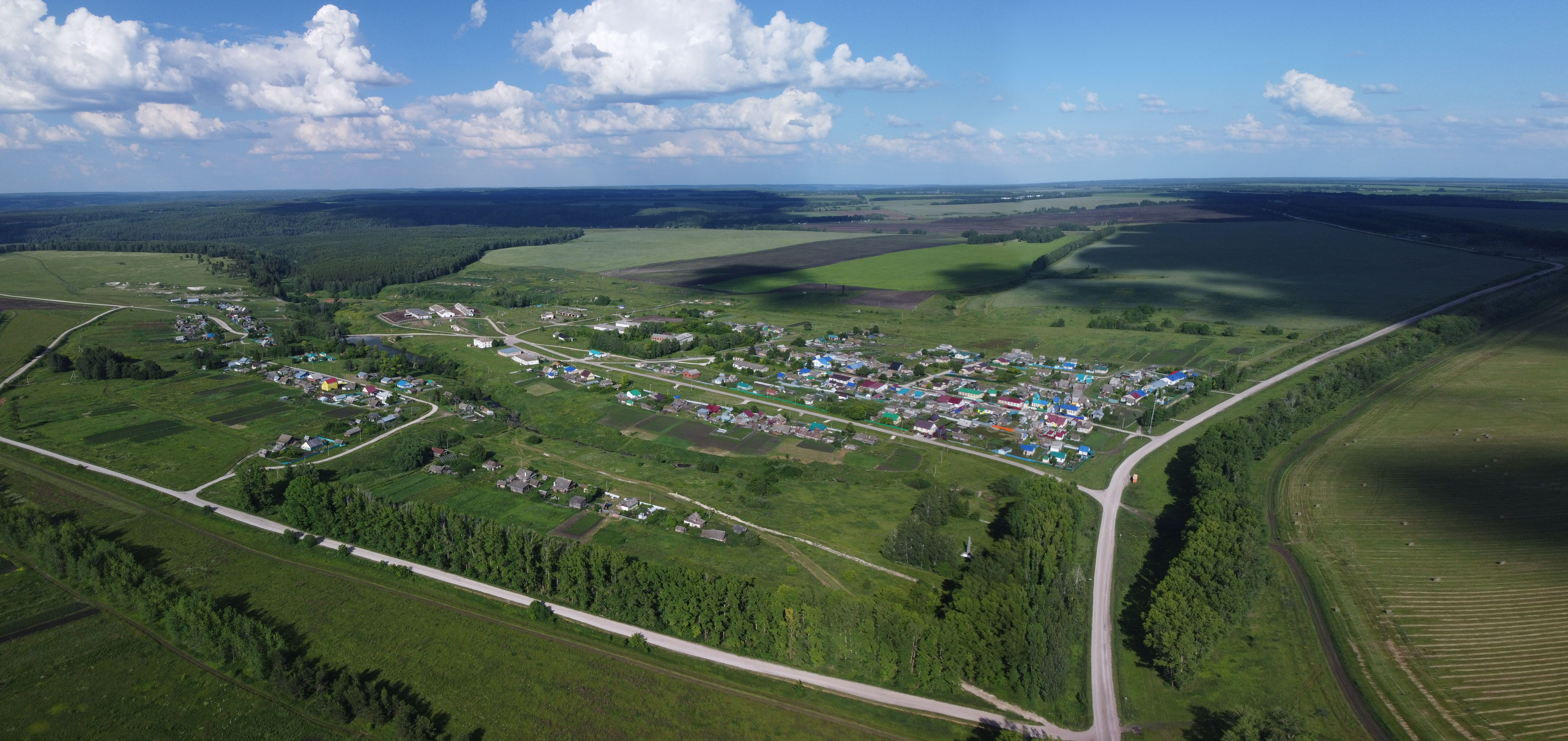
- Pakhar village

- Location within Bashkortostan Location within Russia
- Coordinates: 54°02′N 54°17′E
- Country: Russia
- Region: Bashkortostan
- District: Belebeyevsky District
- Time zone: UTC+5:00

Pakhar (Russian: Пахарь) is a rural locality (a village) and the administrative centre of Donskoy Selsoviet, Belebeyevsky District, Bashkortostan, Russia. The population was 414 as of 2010. There are 5 streets.

== Geography ==
Pakhar is located 17 km southeast of Belebey (the district's administrative centre) by road. Annenkovo is the nearest rural locality.
