= Russkaya Shveytsariya =

Russkaya Shveytsariya Русская Швейцария
- Village
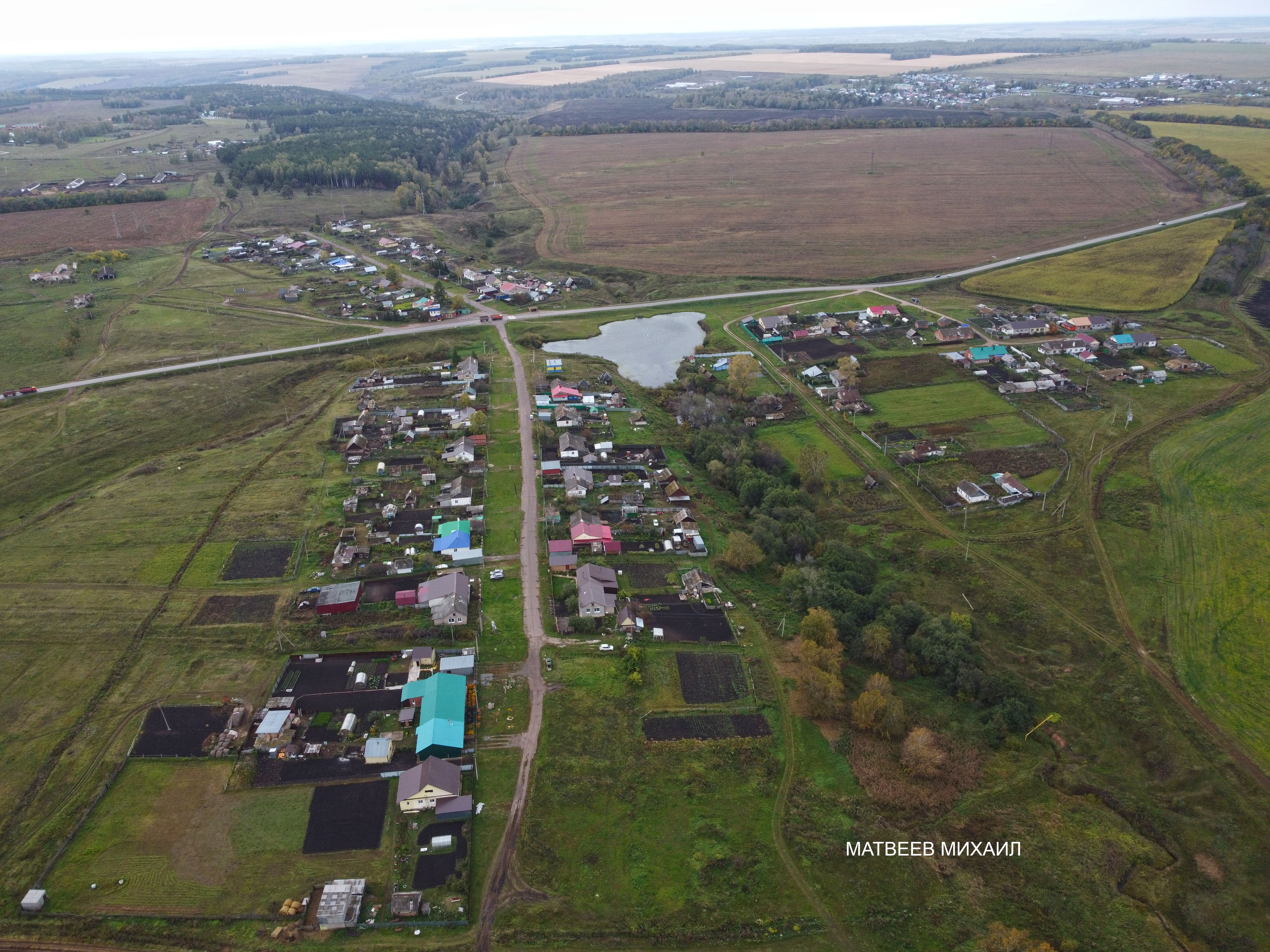

- Location within Bashkortostan Location within Russia
- Coordinates: 54°00′N 54°20′E
- Country: Russia
- Region: Bashkortostan
- District: Belebeyevsky District
- Time zone: UTC+5:00

Russkaya Shveytsariya (Russian: Русская Швейцария; Bashkir: Урыҫ Швейцарияһы, Urıś Şveytsariyahı, lit. "Russian Switzerland") is a rural locality (a village) in Maxim-Gorkovsky Selsoviet, Belebeyevsky District, Bashkortostan, Russia. The population was 225 as of 2010. There are 4 streets.

== Geography ==
Russkaya Shveytsariya is located 22 km southeast of Belebey (the district's administrative centre) by road. Selo Tsentralnoy usadby plemzavoda imeni Maxima Gorkogo is the nearest rural locality.
