= Sharovka =

Sharovka Шаровка
- Village
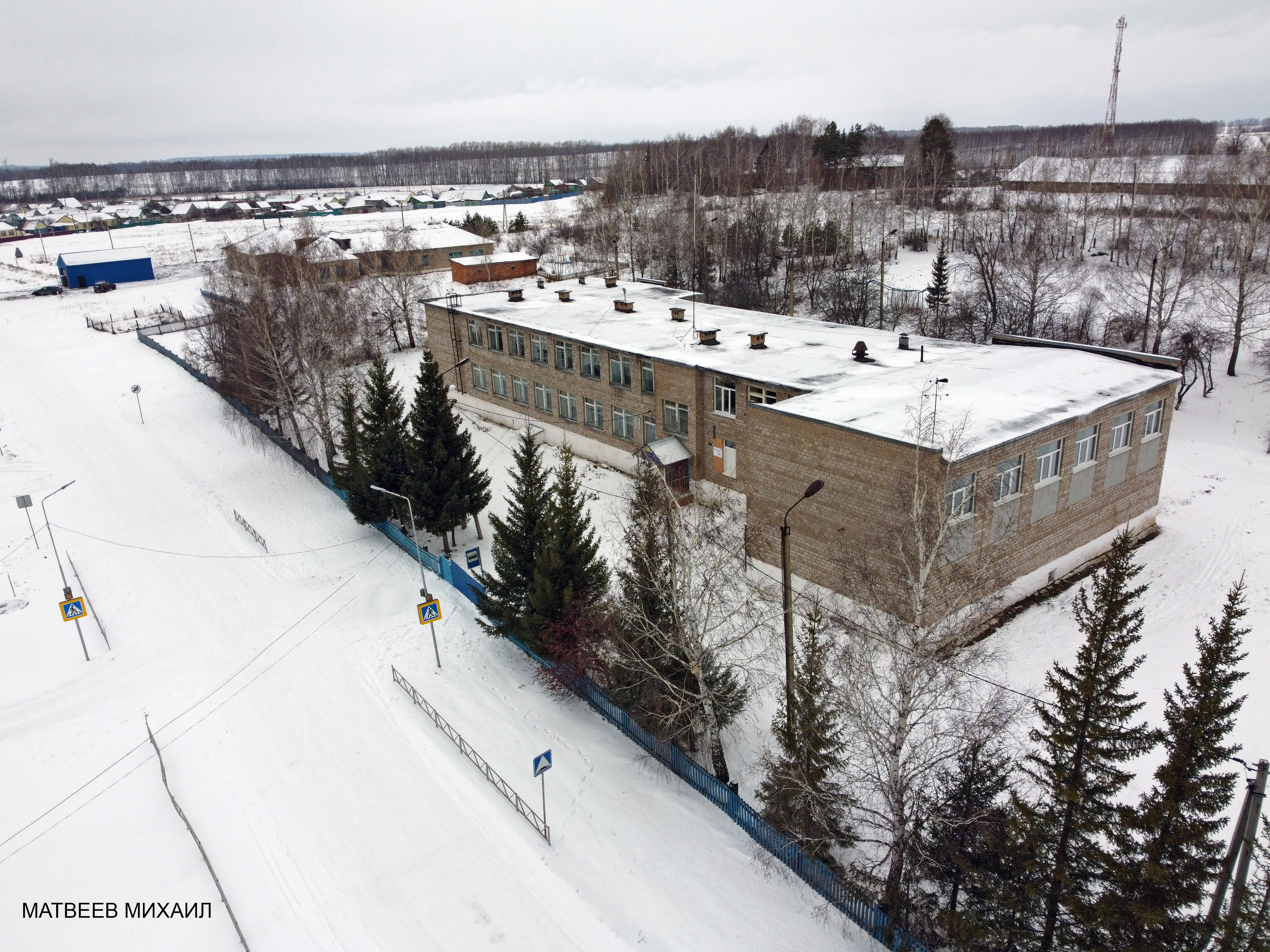
- Sharovka School

- Location within Bashkortostan Location within Russia
- Coordinates: 54°01′N 54°23′E
- Country: Russia
- Region: Bashkortostan
- District: Belebeyevsky District
- Time zone: UTC+5:00

Sharovka (Russian: Шаровка) is a rural locality (a village) and the administrative centre of Sharovsky Selsoviet, Belebeyevsky District, Bashkortostan, Russia. The population was 365 as of 2010. There are 4 streets.

== Geography ==
Sharovka is located 27 km southeast of Belebey (the district's administrative centre) by road. Bulanovka is the nearest rural locality.
