= Mezhdugornoye =

Mezhdugornoye Междугорное
- Village
- Location within Bashkortostan Location within Russia
- Coordinates: 54°06′N 54°15′E
- Country: Russia
- Region: Bashkortostan
- District: Belebeyevsky District
- Time zone: UTC+5:00

Mezhdugornoye (Russian: Междугорное) is a rural locality (a village) in Donskoy Selsoviet, Belebeyevsky District, Bashkortostan, Russia. The population was 1 as of 2010. There is 1 street.

== Geography ==
Mezhdugornoye is located 11 km east of Belebey (the district's administrative centre) by road. Siushka is the nearest rural locality.
