= Verovka =

Verovka Веровка
- Selo
- Location within Bashkortostan Location within Russia
- Coordinates: 54°09′N 54°29′E
- Country: Russia
- Region: Bashkortostan
- District: Belebeyevsky District
- Time zone: UTC+5:00

Verovka (Russian: Веровка) is a rural locality (a selo) in Usen-Ivanovsky Selsoviet, Belebeyevsky District, Bashkortostan, Russia. The population was 357 as of 2010. There are 5 streets.

== Geography ==
Verovka is located 35 km east of Belebey (the district's administrative centre) by road. Chermasan is the nearest rural locality.
