= Bulanovka =

Bulanovka Булановка
- Village
- Location within Bashkortostan Location within Russia
- Coordinates: 53°59′N 54°23′E
- Country: Russia
- Region: Bashkortostan
- District: Belebeyevsky District
- Time zone: UTC+5:00

Bulanovka (Russian: Булановка; Bashkir: Болан, Bolan) is a rural locality (a village) in Sharovsky Selsoviet, Belebeyevsky District, Bashkortostan, Russia. The population was 409 as of 2010. There are 2 streets.

== Geography ==
Bulanovka is located 27 km southeast of Belebey (the district's administrative centre) by road. Glukhovskaya is the nearest rural locality.
