= Glukhovskaya =

Glukhovskaya Глуховская
- Selo
- Location within Bashkortostan Location within Russia
- Coordinates: 53°59′N 54°22′E
- Country: Russia
- Region: Bashkortostan
- District: Belebeyevsky District
- Time zone: UTC+5:00

Glukhovskaya (Russian: Глуховская) is a rural locality (a selo) in Sharovsky Selsoviet, Belebeyevsky District, Bashkortostan, Russia. The population was 93 as of 2010. There are 2 streets.

== Geography ==
Glukhovskaya is located 26 km southeast of Belebey (the district's administrative centre) by road. Bulanovka is the nearest rural locality.
