= Novaya Derevnya, Belebeyevsky District, Republic of Bashkortostan =

Novaya Derevnya Новая Деревня
- Village
- Location within Bashkortostan Location within Russia
- Coordinates: 54°09′N 53°58′E
- Country: Russia
- Region: Bashkortostan
- District: Belebeyevsky District
- Time zone: UTC+5:00

Novaya Derevnya (Russian: Новая Деревня) is a rural locality (a village) in Yermolkinsky Selsoviet, Belebeyevsky District, Bashkortostan, Russia. The population was 17 as of 2010. There are 3 streets.

== Geography ==
Novaya Derevnya is located 13 km northwest of Belebey (the district's administrative centre) by road. Adelkino is the nearest rural locality.
