= Krasnorechka =

Krasnorechka Красноречка
- Village
- Location within Bashkortostan Location within Russia
- Coordinates: 54°15′N 54°01′E
- Country: Russia
- Region: Bashkortostan
- District: Belebeyevsky District
- Time zone: UTC+5:00

Krasnorechka (Russian: Красноречка) is a rural locality (a village) in Annovsky Selsoviet, Belebeyevsky District, Bashkortostan, Russia. The population was 5 as of 2010. There is 1 street.

== Geography ==
Krasnorechka is located 8 km northeast of Belebey (the district's administrative centre) by road.
