= Yangi-Kyuch =

Yangi-Kyuch Янги-Кюч
- Village
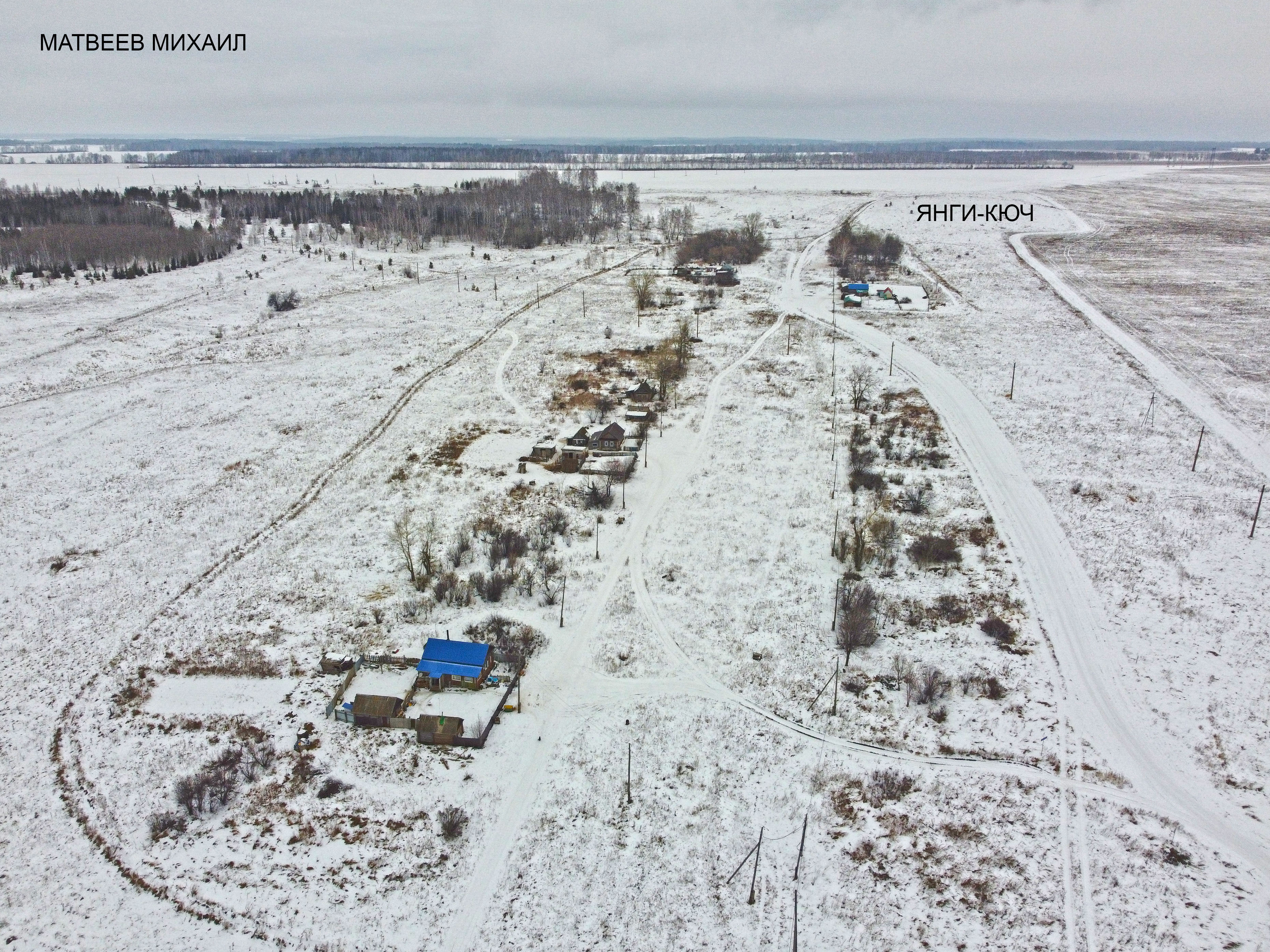

- Location within Bashkortostan Location within Russia
- Coordinates: 54°01′N 54°04′E
- Country: Russia
- Region: Bashkortostan
- District: Belebeyevsky District
- Time zone: UTC+5:00

Yangi-Kyuch (Russian: Янги-Кюч; Bashkir: Яңы Көс, Yañı Kös) is a rural locality (a village) in Malinovsky Selsoviet, Belebeyevsky District, Bashkortostan, Russia. As of 2010, the population is 14. The village has one street.

== Geography ==
Yangi-Kyuch is located 15 km southwest of Belebey (the district's administrative centre) by road. Serdyuki is the nearest rural locality.
