= Malinovka, Belebeyevsky District, Republic of Bashkortostan =

Malinovka Малиновка
- Village
- Location within Bashkortostan Location within Russia
- Coordinates: 53°59′N 54°04′E
- Country: Russia
- Region: Bashkortostan
- District: Belebeyevsky District
- Time zone: UTC+5:00

Malinovka (Russian: Малиновка) is a rural locality (a village) and the administrative centre of Malinovsky Selsoviet, Belebeyevsky District, Bashkortostan, Russia. The population was 440 as of 2010. There are 9 streets.

== Geography ==
Malinovka is located 15 km south of Belebey (the district's administrative centre) by road. Skobelevka is the nearest rural locality.
