= Siushka =

Siushka Сиушка
- Village
- Location within Bashkortostan Location within Russia
- Coordinates: 54°05′N 54°12′E
- Country: Russia
- Region: Bashkortostan
- District: Belebeyevsky District
- Time zone: UTC+5:00

Siushka (Russian: Сиушка) is a rural locality (a village) in Donskoy Selsoviet, Belebeyevsky District, Bashkortostan, Russia. The population was 140 as of 2010. There are 3 streets.

== Geography ==
Siushka is located 9 km east of Belebey (the district's administrative centre) by road. Podlesnoye is the nearest rural locality.
