= Serdyuki =

Serdyuki Сердюки
- Village
- Location within Bashkortostan Location within Russia
- Coordinates: 54°00′N 54°04′E
- Country: Russia
- Region: Bashkortostan
- District: Belebeyevsky District
- Time zone: UTC+5:00

Serdyuki (Russian: Сердюки) is a rural locality (a village) in Malinovsky Selsoviet, Belebeyevsky District, Bashkortostan, Russia. The population was 2 as of 2010. There is one street.

== Geography ==
Serdyuki is located 14 km south of Belebey (the district's administrative centre) by road. Yangi-Kyuch is the nearest rural locality.
