= Adelkino =

Adelkino Аделькино
- Selo
- Location within Bashkortostan Location within Russia
- Coordinates: 54°11′N 53°57′E
- Country: Russia
- Region: Bashkortostan
- District: Belebeyevsky District
- Time zone: UTC+5:00

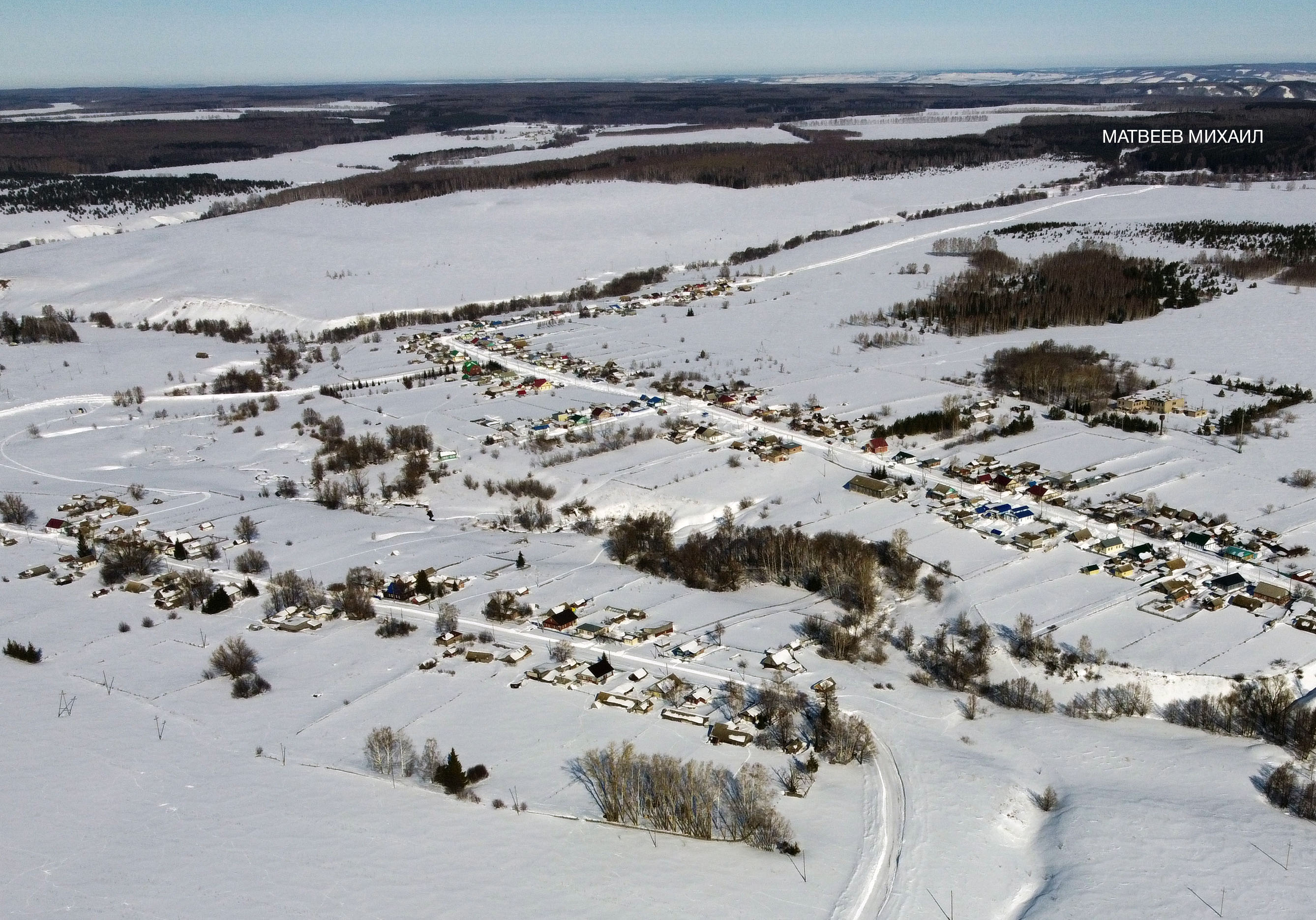
Adelkino

Adelkino (Russian: Аделькино) is a rural locality (a selo) in Yermolkinsky Selsoviet, Belebeyevsky District, Bashkortostan, Russia. The population was 304 as of 2010. There are 5 streets.

== Geography ==
Adelkino is located 16 km northwest of Belebey (the district's administrative centre) by road. Yermolkino is the nearest rural locality.
