= Nadezhdino, Belebeyevsky District, Republic of Bashkortostan =

Nadezhdino Надеждино
- Selo
- Location within Bashkortostan Location within Russia
- Coordinates: 54°02′N 54°09′E
- Country: Russia
- Region: Bashkortostan
- District: Belebeyevsky District
- Time zone: UTC+5:00

Nadezhdino (Russian: Надеждино) is a rural locality (a selo) in Aksakovsky Selsoviet, Belebeyevsky District, Bashkortostan, Russia. The population was 701 as of 2010. There are 11 streets.

== Geography ==
Nadezhdino is located 10 km southeast of Belebey (the district's administrative centre) by road. Aksakovo is the nearest rural locality.
