= Kirillovka, Belebeyevsky District, Republic of Bashkortostan =

Kirillovka Кирилловка
- Village
- Location within Bashkortostan Location within Russia
- Coordinates: 54°05′N 53°54′E
- Country: Russia
- Region: Bashkortostan
- District: Belebeyevsky District
- Time zone: UTC+5:00

Kirillovka (Russian: Кирилловка) is a rural locality (a village) in Rassvetovsky Selsoviet, Belebeyevsky District, Bashkortostan, Russia. The population was 211 as of 2010. There are 3 streets.

== Geography ==
Kirillovka is located 16 km west of Belebey (the district's administrative centre) by road. Durasovo is the nearest rural locality.
