= Priyutovo =

Priyutovo (Russian: Приютово) is the name of several inhabited localities in Russia.

Urban localities

- Priyutovo, Republic of Bashkortostan, a work settlement under the administrative jurisdiction of Priyutovsky Settlement Council in Belebeyevsky District of the Republic of Bashkortostan

Rural localities

- Priyutovo, Karachevsky District, Bryansk Oblast, a village in Verkhopolsky Rural Administrative Okrug of Karachevsky District in Bryansk Oblast; 53°6′N 34°41′E
- Priyutovo, Navlinsky District, Bryansk Oblast, a village in Sokolovsky Rural Administrative Okrug of Navlinsky District in Bryansk Oblast; 52°55′N 34°39′E
- Priyutovo, Republic of Mordovia, a village in Zhegalovsky Selsoviet of Temnikovsky District in the Republic of Mordovia; 54°44′N 43°29′E
- Priyutovo, Orenburg Oblast, a selo in Sergiyevsky Selsoviet of Orenburgsky District in Orenburg Oblast
