= HC Spartak Moscow =

Ice hockey team based in Moscow, Russia

Spartak Moscow
- City: Moscow, Russia
- League: KHL 2008–2014, 2015–: RSL 1996–1999, 2001–2003, 2004–2006, 2007–2008; Vysshaya Liga 1999–2001, 2003–2004, 2006–2007; IHL 1992–1996; Soviet League Class A 1946–1953, 1955–1992; Soviet League Class B 1954–1955
- Conference: Western
- Division: Bobrov
- Founded: 1946
- Home arena: Megasport (capacity: 11,748)
- Colours
- Owner: Investbank
- Head coach: Alexei Zhamnov
- Captain: Andrei Mironov
- Affiliates: Khimik Voskresensk (VHL); JHC Spartak (MHL); MHC Krylya Sovetov (MHL)
- Website: spartak.ru

HC Spartak Moscow (Russian: ХК Спартак Москва, English: Spartak Moskva) is a professional ice hockey club based in Moscow, Russia. It is a member of the Bobrov Division in the Kontinental Hockey League (KHL). The club played in the Tarasov Division of the KHL during the 2013–14 season. However, the team did not participate in the KHL league in the 2014–15 season, because of financial issues, but rejoined the league prior for the 2015–16 season as a member of the Bobrov Division.

== History ==
One of the sections of the Spartak Moscow sports club, HC Spartak Moscow was established in 1946. They have won the Soviet Championship four times, and have also had European-level success in the Spengler Cup, which they have won five times.

The financial state of the team became worse and worse since the beginning of 2006. After the season, a Russian businessman and huge Spartak fan, Vadim Melkov, volunteered to find suitable sponsorship for his favorite team. After negotiations, the Government of Moscow agreed to cover all of team debts. Some preliminary agreements about team sale were achieved as well. However, Melkov died during the S7 Airlines plane crash of July 9, 2006. All the deal proposals were cancelled. After a month of struggling to improve the financial situation, it was decided by Spartak management to disband the team for a year.

== Honours ==
=== Domestic competitions ===
(gold) Soviet League Championship (4): 1961–62, 1966–67, 1968–69, 1975–76

(gold) USSR Cup (2): 1970, 1971

(gold) Vysshaya Liga Championship (1): 2001

=== Europe ===
(silver) European Cup (2): 1969–70, 1976–77

(gold) Spengler Cup (5): 1980, 1981, 1985, 1989, 1990

(gold) Ahearne Cup (3): 1971, 1972, 1973

(gold) Mountfield Cup (1): 2019

== Season-by-season KHL record ==
Note: GP = Games played, W = Wins, L = Losses, T = Ties, OTL = Overtime/shootout losses, Pts = Points, GF = Goals for, GA = Goals against

| Season | GP | W | L | OTL | Pts | GF | GA | Finish | Top Scorer | Playoffs |
|---|---|---|---|---|---|---|---|---|---|---|
| 2008–09 | 56 | 26 | 21 | 1 | 93 | 173 | 158 | 3rd, Bobrov | Branko Radivojevič (43 points: 17 G, 26 A; 49 GP) | Lost in Quarterfinals, 0–3 (Lokomotiv Yaroslavl) |
| 2009–10 | 56 | 24 | 20 | 0 | 92 | 178 | 168 | 3rd, Bobrov | Branko Radivojevič (55 points: 18 G, 37 A; 56 GP) | Lost in Conference Semifinals, 2–4 (Lokomotiv Yaroslavl) |
| 2010–11 | 54 | 24 | 22 | 3 | 82 | 129 | 142 | 3rd, Bobrov | Štefan Ružička (32 points: 17 G, 15 A; 47 GP) | Lost in Conference Quarterfinals, 0–4 (SKA Saint Petersburg) |
| 2011–12 | 54 | 17 | 27 | 2 | 64 | 124 | 163 | 5th, Bobrov | Štefan Ružička (39 points: 22 G, 17 A; 53 GP) | Did not qualify |
| 2012–13 | 52 | 11 | 28 | 2 | 52 | 106 | 151 | 7th, Tarasov | Branko Radivojevič (21 points: 4 G, 17 A; 50 GP) | Did not qualify |
| 2013–14 | 54 | 12 | 28 | 2 | 58 | 105 | 147 | 7th, Tarasov | Vyacheslav Kozlov (27 points: 8 G, 19 A; 54 GP) | Did not qualify |
| 2014–15 | did not participate | | | | | | | | | |
| 2015–16 | 60 | 25 | 33 | 2 | 77 | 139 | 172 | 6th, Bobrov | Lukáš Radil (32 points: 13 G, 19 A; 57 GP) | Did not qualify |
| 2016–17 | 60 | 21 | 33 | 6 | 66 | 125 | 168 | 6th, Bobrov | Matt Gilroy (38 points: 7 G, 31 A; 57 GP) | Did not qualify |
| 2017–18 | 56 | 29 | 23 | 4 | 85 | 153 | 146 | 3rd, Bobrov | Alexander Khokhlachev (50 points: 19 G, 31 A; 52 GP) | Lost in Conference Quarterfinals, 0–4 (CSKA Moscow) |
| 2018–19 | 62 | 28 | 26 | 8 | 64 | 156 | 158 | 4th, Bobrov | Alexander Khokhlachev (37 points: 18 G, 19 A; 54 GP) | Lost in Conference Quarterfinals, 2–4 (SKA Saint Petersburg) |
| 2019–20 | 62 | 34 | 19 | 9 | 77 | 173 | 143 | 4th, Bobrov | Artyom Fyodorov (41 points: 18 G, 23 A; 56 GP) | Lost in Conference Quarterfinals, 2–4 (Dynamo Moscow) |
| 2020–21 | 60 | 28 | 25 | 7 | 63 | 157 | 173 | 4th, Bobrov | Sergei Shirokov (42 points: 22 G, 20 A; 59 GP) | Lost in Conference Quarterfinals, 0–4 (CSKA Moscow) |
| 2021–22 | 48 | 26 | 18 | 4 | 56 | 122 | 118 | 3rd, Bobrov | Jori Lehterä (39 points: 10 G, 29 A; 45 GP) | Lost in Conference Semifinals, 1–4 (SKA Saint Petersburg) |
| 2022–23 | 68 | 28 | 32 | 8 | 64 | 154 | 192 | 4th, Bobrov | Alexander Khokhlachev (55 points: 19 G, 36 A; 65 GP) | Did not qualify |
| 2023–24 | 68 | 40 | 20 | 8 | 88 | 233 | 189 | 2nd, Bobrov | Nikolay Goldobin (78 points: 37 G, 41 A; 67 GP) | Lost in Last 16, 2–4 (Metallurg Magnitogorsk) |
| 2024–25 | 68 | 39 | 20 | 9 | 87 | 221 | 197 | 1st, Bobrov | Nikolay Goldobin (55 points: 21 G, 34 A; 62 GP) | Lost in Quarterfinals, 3–4 (Salavat Yulaev Ufa) |
| 2025–26 | 68 | 35 | 24 | 9 | 79 | 204 | 201 | 3rd, Bobrov | Mikhail Maltsev (44 points: 18 G, 26 A; 66 GP) | Lost in Last 16, 1–4 (Lokomotiv Yaroslavl) |

== Players ==
=== Current roster ===
Updated 12 April, 2026.

| No. | Nat | Player | Pos | S/G | Age | Acquired | Birthplace |
|---|---|---|---|---|---|---|---|
| 98 | (Russia) | Alexander Belyayev | F | L | 27 | 2023 | Moscow, Russia |
| 90 | (Canada) | Brandon Biro | C | L | 28 | 2026 | Sherwood Park, Canada |
| 12 | (Russia) | Nikita Buruyanov | RW | L | 23 | 2025 | Stary Oskol, Russia |
| 78 | (Russia) | Roman Bychkov | D | L | 25 | 2024 | Yaroslavl, Russia |
| 99 | (Russia) | Yegor Filin | RW | L | 27 | 2023 | Penza, Russia |
| 40 | (Russia) | Alexandar Georgiev | G | L | 30 | 2025 | Ruse, Bulgaria |
| 87 | (Russia) | Daniil Gutik | LW | R | 25 | 2026 | Khabarovsk, Russia |
| 3 | (Russia) | Daniil Ivanov | D | L | 23 | 2023 | Moscow, Russia |
| 48 | (Slovakia) | Christián Jaroš | D | R | 30 | 2025 | Košice, Slovakia |
| 4 | (United States) | Joey Keane | D | R | 27 | 2025 | Chicago, United States |
| 97 | (Russia) | Nikita Kholodilin | F | L | 24 | 2025 | Barnaul, Russia |
| 8 | (Russia) | Artemi Kniazev | D | L | 25 | 2026 | Kazan, Russia |
| 89 | (Russia) | Veniamin Korolyov | D | L | 23 | 2024 | Vladimir, Russia |
| 20 | (China) | Lucas Lockhart | C | R | 33 | 2025 | Burnaby, Canada |
| 76 | (Russia) | Sergei Lukyantsev | RW | L | 21 | 2024 | Ussuriysk, Russia |
| 13 | (Russia) | Mikhail Maltsev | C | L | 28 | 2023 | Saint Petersburg, Russia |
| 65 | (Russia) | Demid Mansurov | C | R | 26 | 2022 | Chelyabinsk, Russia |
| 94 | (Russia) | Andrei Mironov (C) | D | L | 32 | 2024 | Moscow, Russia |
| 17 | (Russia) | Ivan Morozov | C | R | 26 | 2023 | Verkhnyaya Salda, Russia |
| 62 | (Russia) | Daniil Orlov | D | L | 22 | 2022 | Elektrostal, Russia |
| 28 | (Russia) | Alexander Pashin | RW | L | 24 | 2023 | Priyutovo, Russia |
| 16 | (Russia) | Danil Pivchulin | LW | R | 23 | 2024 | Yakutsk, Russia |
| 24 | (Russia) | Pavel Poryadin (A) | RW | L | 30 | 2023 | Moscow, Russia |
| 95 | (Russia) | German Rubtsov | C | L | 28 | 2022 | Checkhov, Russia |
| 6 | (Russia) | Ivan Ryabov | C | R | 21 | 2024 | Saint Petersburg, Russia |
| 33 | (Russia) | Daniil Sobolev | D | R | 23 | 2024 | Saint Petersburg, Russia |
| 41 | (Russia) | Dmitri Solovyov | LW | R | 24 | 2023 | Uglich, Russia |
| 77 | (Russia) | Nikita Susuyev | F | L | 21 | 2022 | Moscow, Russia |
| 55 | (Russia) | Dmitri Vishnevsky (A) | D | R | 36 | 2018 | Bogatischevo, Russian SFSR |
| 31 | (Russia) | Yevgeni Volokhin | G | L | 21 | 2025 | Khanty-Mansiysk, Russia |
| 92 | (Russia) | Stanislav Yarovoy | F | R | 23 | 2025 | Tuymazy, Russia |
| 50 | (Russia) | Artyom Zagidulin | G | L | 31 | 2024 | Magnitogorsk, Russia |

=== NHL alumni ===
- (Soviet Union) Nikolai Borschevsky (1989–92, 1994–95, 1996–98)
- (Soviet Union) Vitali Prokhorov (1983–92, 1994–95, 1997–98)
- (Soviet Union) Alexander Selivanov (1988–94)
- (Russia) Danny Markov (1993–97)
- (Russia) Pavel Bure (1994–95)
- (Russia) Ilya Kovalchuk (1999–2001)
- (Russia) Oleg Petrov (2012–13)
- (Russia) Vyacheslav Kozlov (2012–14)
- (Slovakia) Martin Cibák(2009–11)
- (Slovakia) Štefan Ružička (2008–13)
- (Slovakia) Branko Radivojevič (2008–11, 2012–13)
- (Sweden) Tom Wandell (2013–14)
- (United States) Deron Quint (2013–14)
- (United States) Matt Anderson (2013–14)
- (Czech Republic) Dominik Hašek (2010–11)
- (Canada) Tyler Moss (2005–06)

=== Other players ===
- Vladimir Peshekhonov

=== Franchise KHL scoring leaders ===
These are the top-ten point-scorers in franchise history. Figures are updated after each completed KHL regular season.

Note: Pos = Position; GP = Games played; G = Goals; A = Assists; Pts = Points; P/G = Points per game; = current Spartak player

Points
| Player | Pos | GP | G | A | Pts | P/G |
|---|---|---|---|---|---|---|
| (Russia) Alexander Khokhlachev | C | 299 | 88 | 128 | 216 | .72 |
| (Slovakia) Štefan Ružička | RW | 247 | 81 | 83 | 164 | .66 |
| (Slovakia) Branko Radivojevič | RW | 209 | 46 | 103 | 149 | .71 |
| (Russia) Dmitri Vishnevsky | D | 460 | 38 | 109 | 147 | .32 |
| (Russia) Pavel Poryadin | RW | 175 | 64 | 76 | 140 | .80 |
| (Czech Republic) Lukáš Radil | LW | 219 | 60 | 75 | 135 | .62 |
| (Russia) Nikolai Goldobin | RW | 129 | 58 | 75 | 133 | 1.03 |
| (Russia) Anatoli Nikontsev | RW | 344 | 66 | 58 | 124 | .36 |
| (Russia) Maxim Tsyplakov | LW | 327 | 63 | 58 | 121 | .37 |
| (Russia) Andrei Loktionov | C | 213 | 50 | 70 | 120 | .56 |

Goals
| Player | Pos | G |
|---|---|---|
| (Russia) Alexander Khokhlachev | C | 88 |
| (Slovakia) Štefan Ružička | RW | 81 |
| (Russia) Anatoli Nikontsev | RW | 66 |
| (Russia) Pavel Poryadin | RW | 64 |
| (Russia) Maxim Tsyplakov | LW | 63 |
| (Czech Republic) Lukáš Radil | LW | 60 |
| (Russia) Nikolai Goldobin | RW | 58 |
| (Russia) Andrei Loktionov | C | 50 |
| (Slovakia) Branko Radivojevič | RW | 46 |
| (Russia) Roman Lyuduchin | F | 46 |

Assists
| Player | Pos | A |
|---|---|---|
| (Russia) Alexander Khokhlachev | C | 128 |
| (Russia) Dmitri Vishnevsky | D | 109 |
| (Slovakia) Branko Radivojevič | RW | 103 |
| (Slovakia) Štefan Ružička | RW | 83 |
| (Russia) Pavel Poryadin | RW | 76 |
| (Russia) Nikolai Goldobin | RW | 75 |
| (Czech Republic) Lukáš Radil | LW | 75 |
| (Russia) Ivan Morozov | C | 75 |
| (Russia) Andrei Loktionov | C | 70 |
| (Russia) Mikhail Yunkov | C | 66 |
