= Administrative divisions of Bashkortostan =

Administrative territorial entity of Russia

Republic of Bashkortostan Russia
- Administrative centre: Ufa

Administrative structure (as of 2013)
- Districts: 54
- Cities/towns: 21
- Urban-type settlements: 2
- Selsovets: 827

Municipal structure (as of 2002)
- Rural settlements: 4,586 (inhabited); 84 (uninhabited)

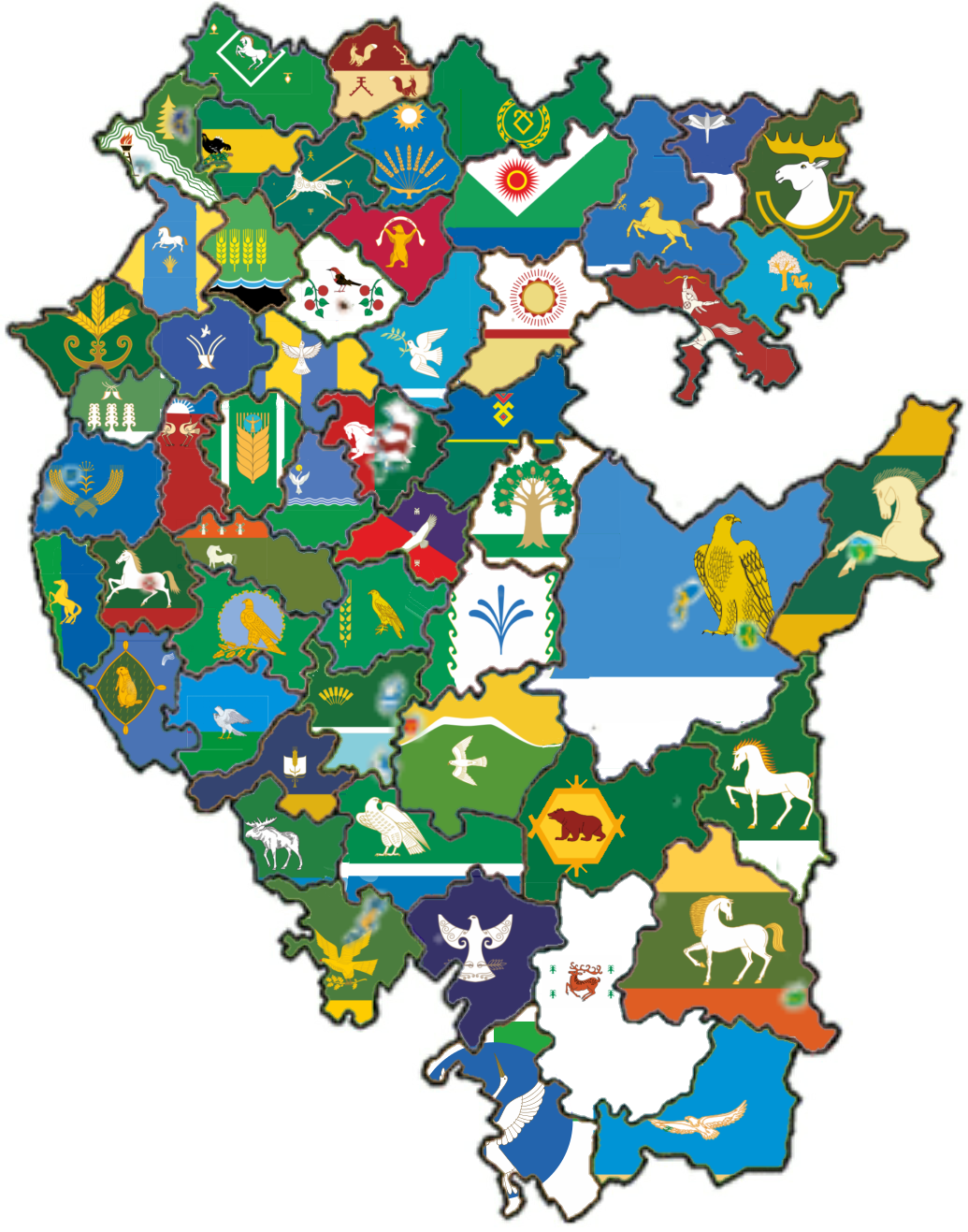
Map of Bashkortostan (showing flags)

Administrative and territorial division of the Republic of Bashkortostan is regulated by the Law #178-z of the Republic of Bashkortostan, passed by the State Assembly—Kurultai on April 20, 2005. The Law established the following classification:

== Definitions ==
- administrative units (административно-территориальные единицы):
  - district (район)—an administrative unit established to govern selsoviets, rural settlement councils, and towns under that district's jurisdiction. Districts cover territories with population of at least 20,000.
  - selsoviet (сельсовет)—an administrative unit established to govern one or several rural localities with adjacent territories. Selsoviets cover territories with populations of at least 1,000.
  - settlement council (поссовет)—an administrative unit established to govern an urban-type settlement with adjacent territories and/or selsoviets. Settlement councils have not been implemented in practice.
- inhabited localities (населённые пункты):
  - urban localities (городские населённые пункты):
    - city/town under republic's jurisdiction (город республиканского значения);
      - city district (городской район)—an administrative unit of cities under republic's jurisdiction established to improve municipal government efficiency.
    - city/town under a district's jurisdiction (город районного значения)
    - urban-type settlement (посёлок городского типа):
      - work settlement (рабочий посёлок);
      - suburban (dacha) settlement (дачный посёлок); not implemented in practice;
      - resort settlement (курортный посёлок); not implemented in practice
  - rural localities (сельские населённые пункты):
    - aul (аул);
    - khutor (хутор);
    - selo (село);
    - village (деревня)
  - closed administrative-territorial formations (закрытое административно-территориальное образование)—territories under the federal government management with travel and residency restrictions; usually military objects.

All administrative units have administrative centers, defined as urban or rural localities housing the Government of the Republic of Bashkortostan, or municipal and local government organs.

Changes in the overall administrative and territorial structure of the Republic are authorized by the State Assembly—Kurultai. All changes must later be registered in the Russian Classification of Objects of Administrative Division on the federal level.

== Administrative and municipal divisions ==
Map

| Division | | Bashkir name | Structure | | OKATO | OKTMO | Urban-type settlement | Rural (selsovet) |
| Division | | Bashkir name | Administrative | Municipal | OKATO | OKTMO | Urban-type settlement | Rural (selsovet) |
|---|---|---|---|---|---|---|---|---|
| Mezhgorye (Межгорье) | | | city (ZATO) | urban okrug | 80 507 | 80 707 | | |
| Ufa (Уфа) | | Өфө, Öfö | city | urban okrug | 80 401 | 80 701 | | |
| ↳ | Demsky (Демский) | | (under Ufa) | —N/a | 80 401 | —N/a | | |
| ↳ | Kalininsky (Калининский) | | (under Ufa) | —N/a | 80 401 | —N/a | | 1 |
| ↳ | Kirovsky (Кировский) | | (under Ufa) | —N/a | 80 401 | —N/a | | 1 |
| ↳ | Leninsky (Ленинский) | | (under Ufa) | —N/a | 80 401 | —N/a | | |
| ↳ | Oktyabrsky (Октябрьский) | | (under Ufa) | —N/a | 80 401 | —N/a | | 1 |
| ↳ | Ordzhonikidzevsky (Орджоникидзевский) | | (under Ufa) | —N/a | 80 401 | —N/a | | 2 |
| ↳ | Sovetsky (Советский) | | (under Ufa) | —N/a | 80 401 | —N/a | | |
| Agidel (Агидель) | | Ағиҙел, Ağiðel | city | urban okrug | 80 403 | 70 703 | | |
| Baymak (Баймак) | | Баймаҡ, Baymaq | city | (under Baymaksky) | 80 404 | 80 607 | | |
| Belebey (Белебей) | | Бәләбәй, Bələbəy | city | (under Belebeyevsky) | 80 405 | 80 609 | | |
| Beloretsk (Белорецк) | | | city | (under Beloretsky) | 80 410 | 80 611 | | |
| Birsk (Бирск) | | Бөрө, Börö | city | (under Birsky) | 80 415 | 80 613 | | |
| Blagoveshchensk (Благовещенск) | | | city | (under Blagoveshchensky) | 80 417 | 80 615 | | |
| Dyurtyuli (Дюртюли) | | Дүртөйлө, Dürtöylö | city | (under Dyurtyulinsky) | 80 418 | 80 624 | | |
| Davlekanovo (Давлеканово) | | Дәүләкән, Dəwləkən | city | (under Davlekanovsky) | 80 419 | 80 622 | | |
| Ishimbay (Ишимбай) | | | city | (under Ishimbaysky) | 80 420 | 80 631 | | |
| Kumertau (Кумертау) | | | city | urban okrug | 80 423 | 70 723 | | 2 |
| Meleuz (Мелеуз) | | | city | (under Meleuzovsky) | 80 425 | 80 642 | | 1 |
| Neftekamsk (Нефтекамск) | | | city | urban okrug | 80 427 | 70 727 | | 2 |
| Oktyabrsky (Октябрьский) | | | city | urban okrug | 80 435 | 70 735 | | |
| Salavat (Салават) | | | city | urban okrug | 80 439 | 70 739 | | |
| Sibay (Сибай) | | | city | urban okrug | 80 443 | 70 743 | | 1 |
| Sterlitamak (Стерлитамак) | | | city | urban okrug | 80 445 | 70 745 | | |
| Tuymazy (Туймазы) | | | city | (under Tuymazinsky) | 80 450 | 80 651 | | |
| Uchaly (Учалы) | | | city | (under Uchalinsky) | 80 455 | 80 652 | | |
| Yanaul (Янаул) | | | city | (under Yanaulsky) | 80 460 | 80 659 | | |
| Abzelilovsky (Абзелиловский) | | | district | | 80 201 | 80 601 | | 15 |
| Alsheyevsky (Альшеевский) | | | district | | 80 202 | 80 602 | | 20 |
| Arkhangelsky (Архангельский) | | | district | | 80 203 | 80 603 | | 12 |
| Askinsky (Аскинский) | | | district | | 80 204 | 80 604 | | 15 |
| Aurgazinsky (Аургазинский) | | | district | | 80 205 | 80 605 | | 21 |
| Bakalinsky (Бакалинский) | | | district | | 80 206 | 80 606 | | 17 |
| Baymaksky (Баймакский) | | | district | | 80 207 | 80 607 | | 22 |
| Baltachevsky (Балтачевский) | | | district | | 80 208 | 80 608 | | 15 |
| Belebeyevsky (Белебеевский) | | | district | | 80 209 | 80 609 | Priyutovo (Приютово) | 15 |
| Belokataysky (Белокатайский) | | | district | | 80 210 | 80 610 | | 13 |
| Beloretsky (Белорецкий) | | | district | | 80 211 | 80 611 | | 19 |
| Bizhbulyaksky (Бижбулякский) | | | district | | 80 212 | 80 612 | | 13 |
| Birsky (Бирский) | | | district | | 80 213 | 80 613 | | 14 |
| Blagovarsky (Благоварский) | | | district | | 80 214 | 80 614 | | 15 |
| Blagoveshchensky (Благовещенский) | | | district | | 80 215 | 80 615 | | 15 |
| Burzyansky (Бурзянский) | | | district | | 80 217 | 80 617 | | 12 |
| Burayevsky (Бураевский) | | | district | | 80 218 | 80 618 | | 13 |
| Buzdyaksky (Буздякский) | | | district | | 80 219 | 80 619 | | 12 |
| Gafuriysky (Гафурийский) | | | district | | 80 221 | 80 621 | | 16 |
| Davlekanovsky (Давлекановский) | | | district | | 80 222 | 80 622 | | 16 |
| Duvansky (Дуванский) | | | district | | 80 223 | 80 623 | | 13 |
| Dyurtyulinsky (Дюртюлинский) | | | district | | 80 224 | 80 624 | | 14 |
| Yermekeyevsky (Ермекеевский) | | | district | | 80 225 | 80 625 | | 13 |
| Zianchurinsky (Зианчуринский) | | | district | | 80 226 | 80 626 | | 15 |
| Zilairsky (Зилаирский) | | | district | | 80 227 | 80 627 | | 13 |
| Iglinsky (Иглинский) | | | district | | 80 228 | 80 628 | | 19 |
| Ilishevsky (Илишевский) | | | district | | 80 230 | 80 630 | | 22 |
| Ishimbaysky (Ишимбайский) | | | district | | 80 231 | 80 631 | | 13 |
| Kaltasinsky (Калтасинский) | | | district | | 80 233 | 80 633 | | 11 |
| Karaidelsky (Караидельский) | | | district | | 80 234 | 80 634 | | 16 |
| Karmaskalinsky (Кармаскалинский) | | | district | | 80 235 | 80 635 | | 16 |
| Kiginsky (Кигинский) | | | district | | 80 236 | 80 636 | | 9 |
| Krasnokamsky (Краснокамский) | | | district | | 80 237 | 80 637 | | 14 |
| Kugarchinsky (Кугарчинский) | | | district | | 80 238 | 80 638 | | 20 |
| Kuyurgazinsky (Куюргазинский) | | | district | | 80 239 | 80 639 | | 12 |
| Kushnarenkovsky (Кушнаренковский) | | | district | | 80 240 | 80 640 | | 12 |
| Mechetlinsky (Мечетлинский) | | | district | | 80 241 | 80 641 | | 12 |
| Meleuzovsky (Мелеузовский) | | | district | | 80 242 | 80 642 | | 16 |
| Mishkinsky (Мишкинский) | | | district | | 80 243 | 80 643 | | 14 |
| Miyakinsky (Миякинский) | | | district | | 80 244 | 80 644 | | 15 |
| Nurimanovsky (Нуримановский) | | | district | | 80 245 | 80 645 | | 12 |
| Salavatsky (Салаватский) | | | district | | 80 247 | 80 647 | | 16 |
| Sterlibashevsky (Стерлибашевский) | | | district | | 80 248 | 80 648 | | 15 |
| Sterlitamaksky (Стерлитамакский) | | | district | | 80 249 | 80 649 | | 20 |
| Tatyshlinsky (Татышлинский) | | | district | | 80 250 | 80 650 | | 13 |
| Tuymazinsky (Туймазинский) | | | district | | 80 251 | 80 651 | | 18 |
| Uchalinsky (Учалинский) | | | district | | 80 252 | 80 652 | | 18 |
| Ufimsky (Уфимский) | | | district | | 80 253 | 80 653 | | 19 |
| Fyodorovsky (Фёдоровский) | | | district | | 80 254 | 80 654 | | 13 |
| Khaybullinsky (Хайбуллинский) | | | district | | 80 255 | 80 655 | | 14 |
| Chekmagushevsky (Чекмагушевский) | | | district | | 80 256 | 80 656 | | 13 |
| Chishminsky (Чишминский) | | | district | | 80 257 | 80 657 | Chishmy (Чишмы) | 15 |
| Sharansky (Шаранский) | | | district | | 80 258 | 80 658 | | 13 |
| Yanaulsky (Янаульский) | | | district | | 80 259 | 80 659 | | 18 |
