= Chubukaran, Sharovsky Selsoviet, Belebeyevsky District, Republic of Bashkortostan =

Chubukaran Чубукаран
- Village
- Location within Bashkortostan Location within Russia
- Coordinates: 54°00′N 54°31′E
- Country: Russia
- Region: Bashkortostan
- District: Belebeyevsky District
- Time zone: UTC+5:00

Chubukaran (Russian: Чубукаран; Bashkir: Сыбыҡаран, Sıbıqaran) is a rural locality (a village) in Sharovsky Selsoviet, Belebeyevsky District, Bashkortostan, Russia. The population was 104 as of 2010.

== Geography ==
It is located 37 km from Belebey and 12 km from Sharovka.
