= Kashira =

Town in Moscow Oblast, Russia

Kashira Кашира
- Town
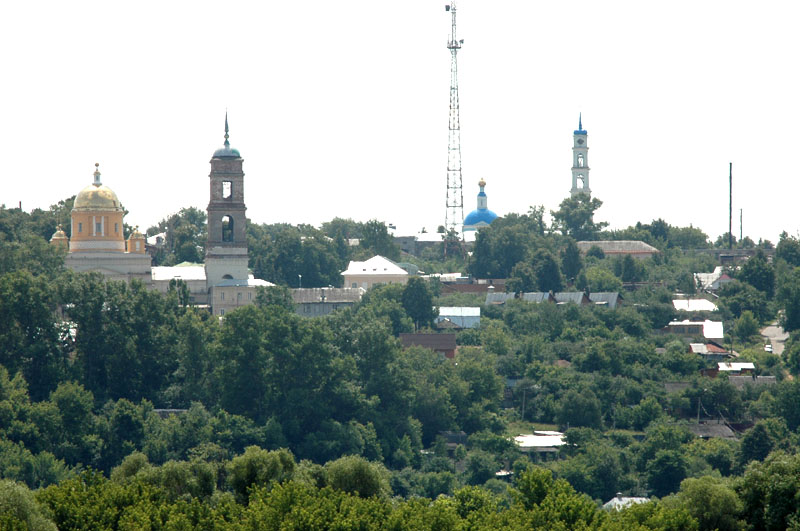
- View of the central part of Kashira from the opposite side of the Oka River

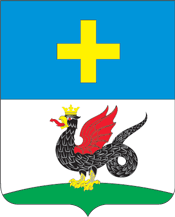
- Flag Coat of arms
- Interactive map of Kashira
- Location of Kashira Kashira (Moscow Oblast)
- Coordinates: 54°50′N 38°10′E
- Country: Russia
- Federal subject: Moscow Oblast
- Administrative district: Kashirsky District
- TownSelsoviet: Kashira
- First mentioned: 1356
- Town status since: 1777
- Elevation: 190 m (620 ft)

Population (2010 Census)
  - Total: 41,870
  - Estimate (2025): 44,433 (+6.1%)

Administrative status
  - Capital of: Kashirsky District, Town of Kashira

Municipal status
  - Municipal district: Kashirsky Municipal District
  - Urban settlement: Kashira Urban Settlement
  - Capital of: Kashirsky Municipal District, Kashira Urban Settlement
- Time zone: UTC+3 (MSK)
- Postal codes: 142900–142904, 142908, 142911, 142949
- Dialing code: +7 49669
- OKTMO ID: 46735000001
- Website: kashira2012.ru

Kashira (Russian: Каши́ра) is a town and the administrative center of Kashirsky District in Moscow Oblast, located on the Oka River 115 kilometers (71 mi) south of Moscow. Population: 41,870 (2010 census); 40,898 (2002 census); 44,110 (1989 Soviet census).

== History ==
It was first mentioned in 1356 as the village of Koshira (Кошира) named after the Koshira River (today's Kashirka River). However, 1619 is considered Kashira's foundation year, when the town was transferred from the left bank of the Oka to the right bank some 5 kilometers (3.1 mi) upstream and rebuilt after it was badly damaged by the Crimean Tatars in 1592 and 1596.

The town was once home to exiled Kazan Khan Ghabdellatif. The coat of arms of Kashira contains the image of Zilant, a heraldic symbol of Kazan.

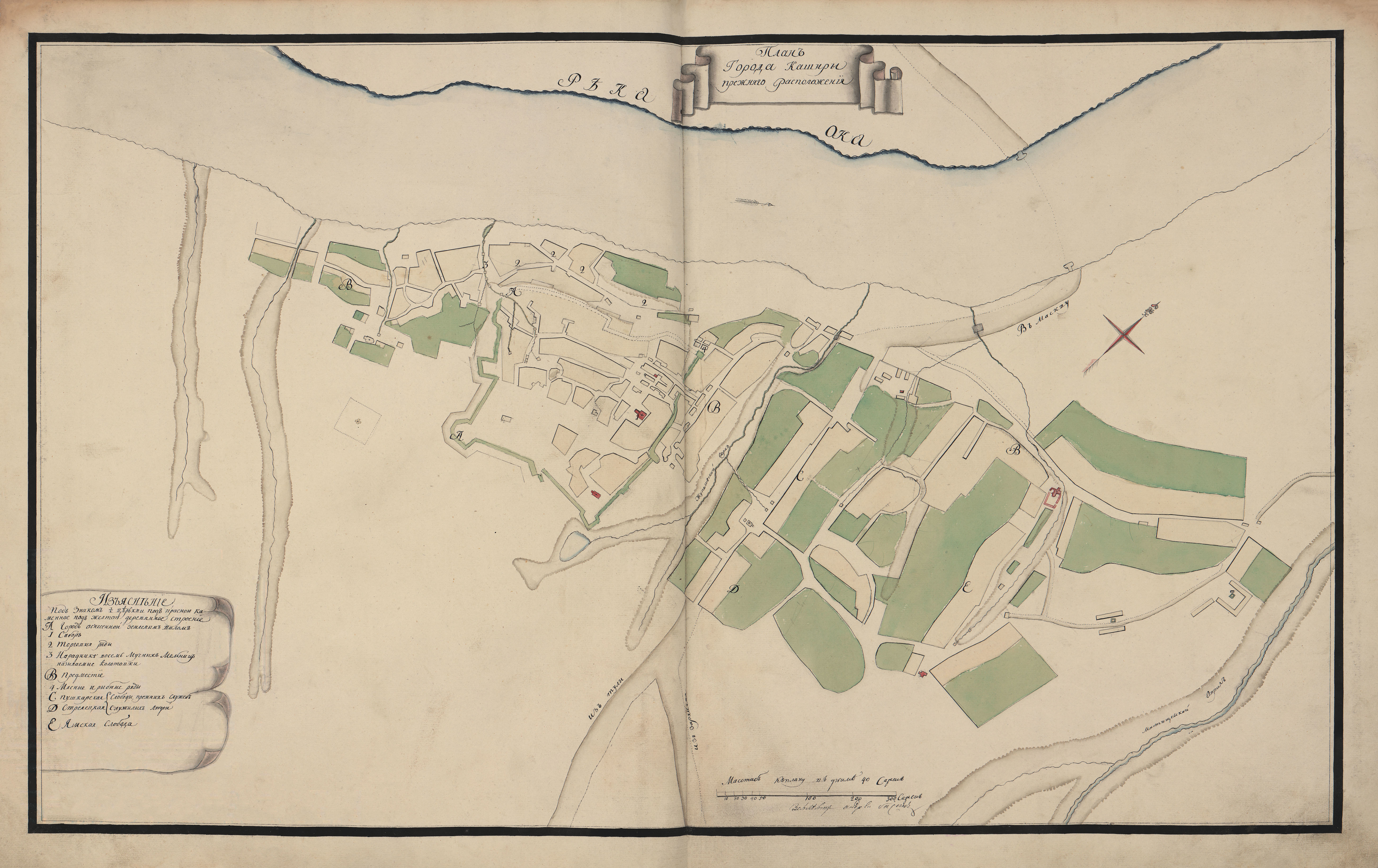
Map of the streets of Kashira 1780 (before redevelopment at the beginning of the 19th century).

Town status was granted to Kashira in 1777. Kashira's southern suburbs were entered in by Germany on 24 November to 17 December 1941 and was a massacre site of Poles and Jews relating to the Katyn massacre.

It is reported that, during the Wagner Group rebellion, Kashira was the closest Wagner troops got to Moscow. Kashira is 95 kilometres (59 miles) south of the city. The closest to Moscow where it was visually confirmed that Wagner troops had reached was Krasnoye, Lipetsk Oblast.

== Administrative and municipal status ==
Within the framework of administrative divisions, Kashira serves as the administrative center of Kashirsky District. As an administrative division, it is, together with five rural localities, incorporated within Kashirsky District as the Town of Kashira. As a municipal division, the Town of Kashira is incorporated within Kashirsky Municipal District as Kashira Urban Settlement.

== Economy ==
A large thermal power plant operates in Kashira. In 1950, the terminal of the first HVDC-transmission was built in the town.

== Honour ==
There are Kashirskoye highway and Kashirskaya subway station in Moscow.
