= Anatoli Nikontsev =

Russian ice hockey player (born 1990)

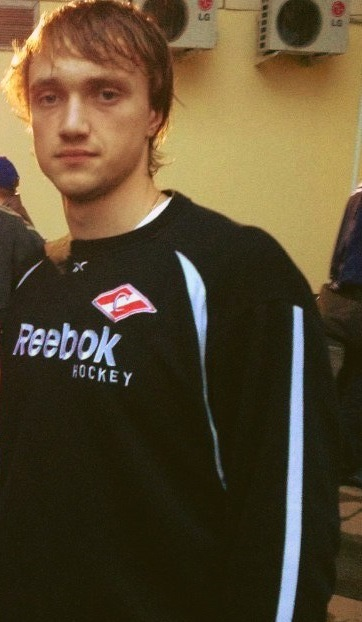
- Born: June 25, 1990 (age 35) Sverdlovsk, Russian SFSR
- Height: 6 ft 0 in (183 cm)
- Weight: 192 lb (87 kg; 13 st 10 lb)
- Position: Right wing
- Shoots: Left
- VHL team Former teams: Sokol Krasnoyarsk; Avtomobilist Yekaterinburg; Spartak Moscow; Severstal Cherepovets; Metallurg Magnitogorsk; Amur Khabarovsk
- Playing career: 2007–present

Anatoly Nikontsev (born June 25, 1990) is a Russian professional ice hockey winger who currently plays for Sokol Krasnoyarsk of the Supreme Hockey League (VHL). In 2010, he won the Cherepanov Memorial Trophy, awarded to the rookie of the year in the Kontinental Hockey League (KHL).
