= Kashirsky District, Moscow Oblast =

Kashirsky District Каширский район (Russian)
- District
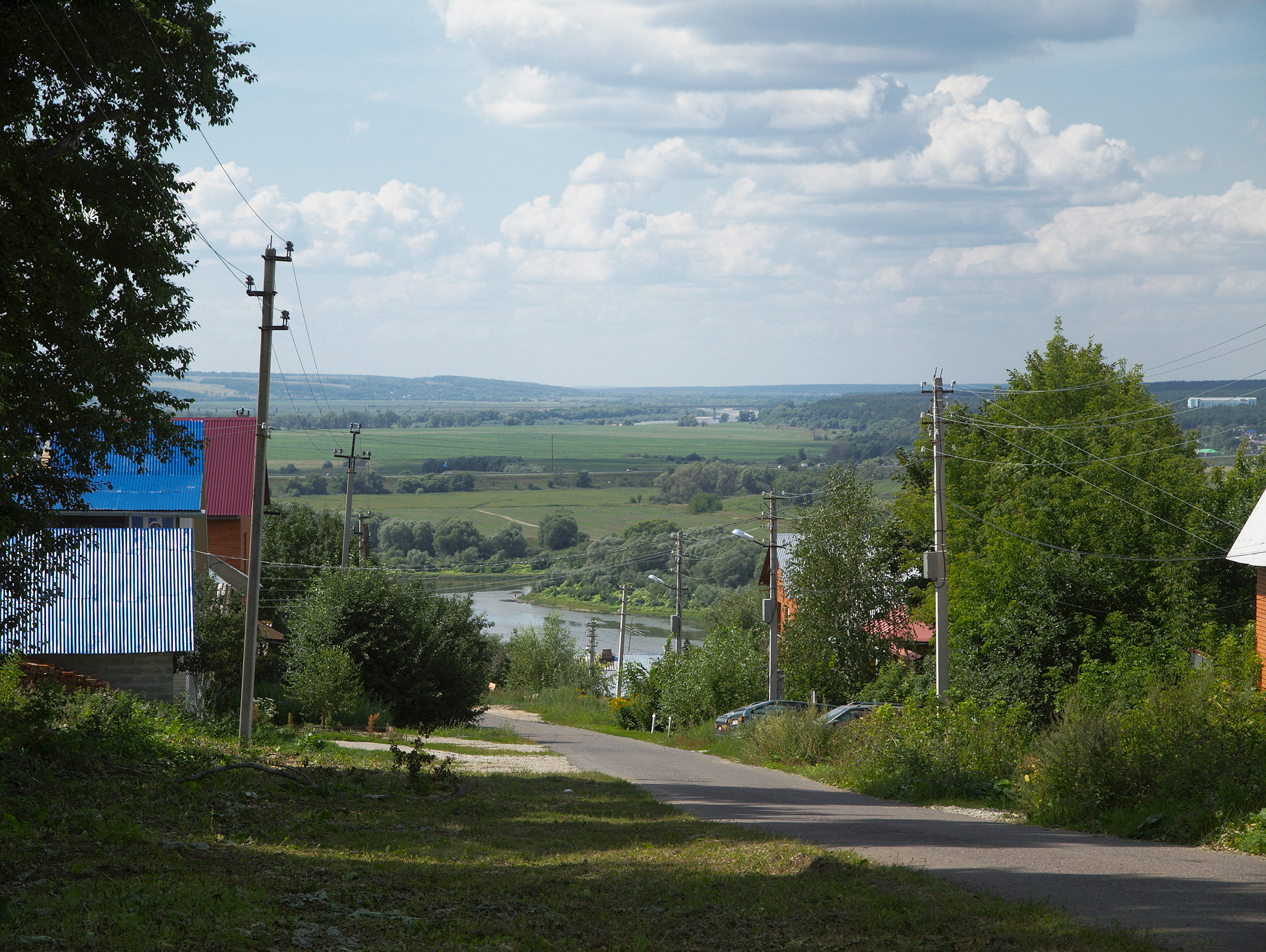
- View of the Oka River, from Kashira, Kashirsky District

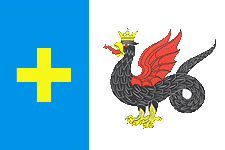
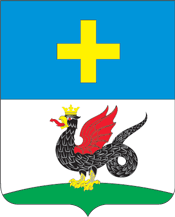
- Flag Coat of arms
- Location of Kashirsky District in Moscow Oblast (before July 2012)
- Coordinates: 54°50′N 38°09′E
- Country: Russia
- Federal subject: Moscow Oblast
- Established: 12 July 1929
- Administrative center: Kashira

Area
  - Total: 646.09 km^{2} (249.46 sq mi)

Population (2010 Census)
  - Total: 70,269
  - Density: 108.76/km^{2} (281.69/sq mi)
  - Urban: 74.5%
  - Rural: 25.5%

Administrative structure
  - Administrative divisions: 2 Towns, 5 Rural settlements
  - Inhabited localities: 2 cities/towns, 96 rural localities

Municipal structure
  - Municipally incorporated as: Kashirsky Municipal District
  - Municipal divisions: 2 urban settlements, 5 rural settlements
- Time zone: UTC+3 (MSK)
- OKTMO ID: 46735000
- Website: http://www.kashira.org/

Kashirsky District (Russian: Каши́рский райо́н) is an administrative and municipal district (raion), one of thirty-six in Moscow Oblast, Russia. It is located in the south of the oblast.

== Geography ==
The area of the district is 646.09 square kilometers (249.46 sq mi). Its administrative center is the town of Kashira.

The population was 70,269 (2010 census); 70,774 (2002 Census); 35,300 (1989 Soviet census). The population of Kashira accounts for 59.6% of the district's total population.

== Notable residents ==
- Fyodor Astakhov (1892–1966), Soviet Marshal of Aviation, born in Ledovskie Vyselki village
- Dmitri Vishnevsky (born 1990), ice hockey player
