= Vladimir Peshekhonov =

Russian ice hockey player (born 1993)

- Born: December 3, 1993 (age 31) Moscow, Russia
- Height: 6 ft 0 in (183 cm)
- Weight: 192 lb (87 kg; 13 st 10 lb)
- Position: Forward
- Shoots: Left
- VHL team Former teams: Torpedo Ust-Kamenogorsk; Spartak Moscow; Atlant Moscow Oblast; CSKA Moscow; Sibir Novosibirsk
- Playing career: 2013–present

Vladimir Peshekhonov (Пешехонов, Владимир Игоревич; born December 3, 1993) is a Russian professional ice hockey player. He is currently playing within the Torpedo Ust-Kamenogorsk organization of the Supreme Hockey League (VHL).

Peshekhonov made his Kontinental Hockey League (KHL) debut playing with HC Spartak Moscow during the 2013–14 KHL season.
