= Dmitri Vishnevsky =

Russian ice hockey player (born 1990)

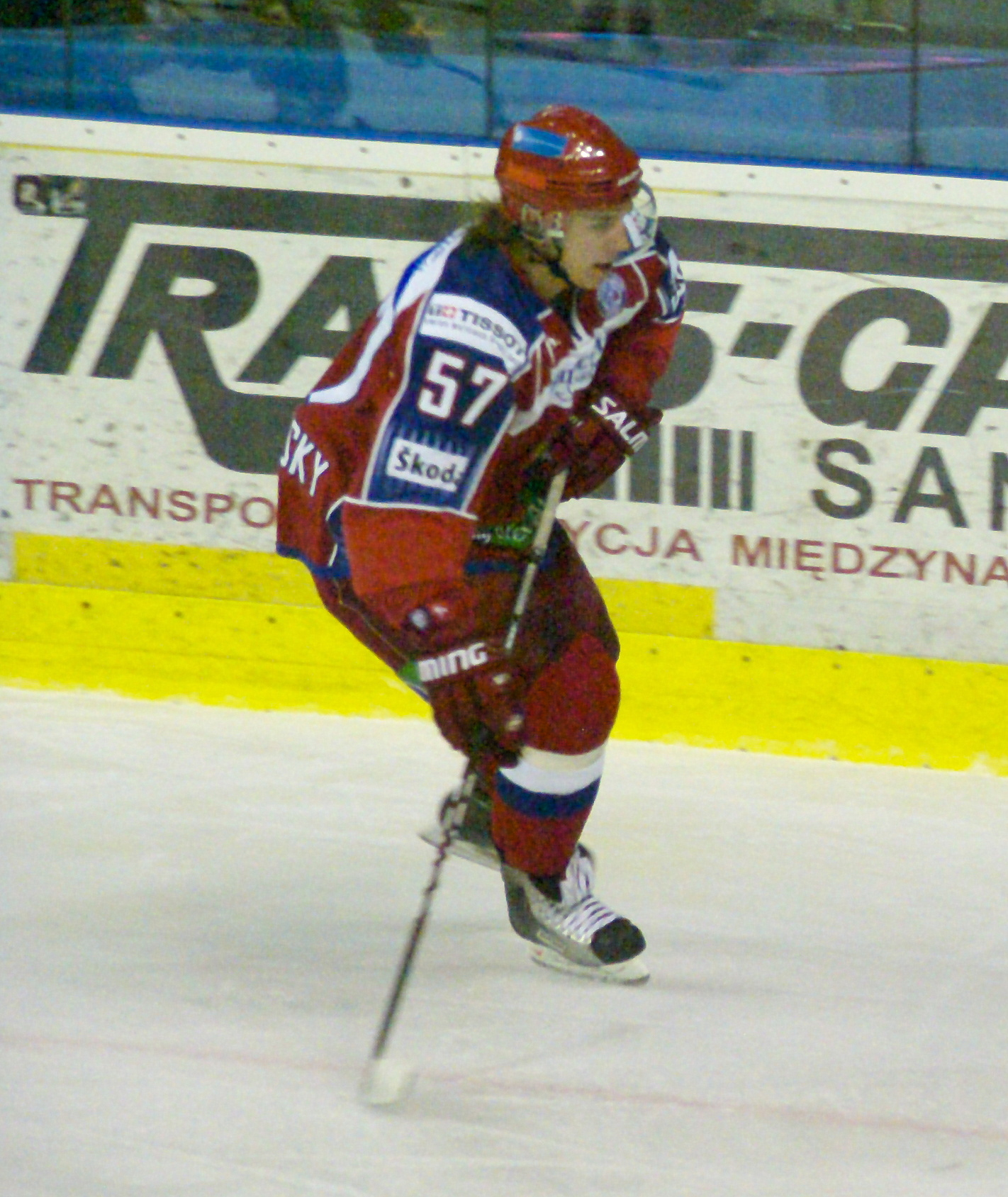
- Born: January 3, 1990 (age 36) Kashirsky District, Moscow Oblast, Russian SFSR, Soviet Union
- Height: 5 ft 10 in (178 cm)
- Weight: 183 lb (83 kg; 13 st 1 lb)
- Position: Defence
- Shoots: Right
- KHL team Former teams: Spartak Moscow; Dynamo Moscow
- Playing career: 2008–present

Dmitri Vishnevsky (born January 3, 1990) is a Russian professional ice hockey defenceman who currently plays for HC Spartak Moscow of the Kontinental Hockey League (KHL).
