= Štefan Ružička =

Slovak ice hockey player (born 1985)

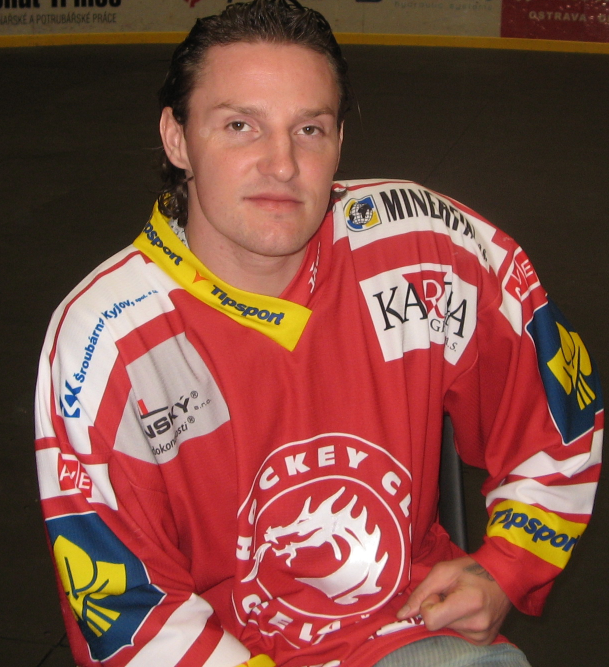
- Born: February 17, 1985 (age 41) Nitra, Czechoslovakia
- Height: 6 ft 0 in (183 cm)
- Weight: 205 lb (93 kg; 14 st 9 lb)
- Position: Right wing
- Shot: Right
- Played for: HK Nitra; Philadelphia Flyers; Spartak Moscow; Salavat Yulaev Ufa; Avangard Omsk; Lausanne HC; HC Slovan Bratislava; HC Oceláři Třinec; HC Sparta Praha
- National team: Slovakia
- NHL draft: 81st overall, 2003; Philadelphia Flyers
- Playing career: 2004–2017

Štefan Ružička (born February 17, 1985) is a Slovak former professional ice hockey forward who last played under contract with HC Sparta Praha of the Czech Extraliga (ELH). He formerly played in the National Hockey League (NHL) with the Philadelphia Flyers and in the Kontinental Hockey League (KHL) where he is the All-time leading scorer for HC Spartak Moscow.

== Playing career ==
Ružička was drafted in the third round of the 2003 NHL entry draft by the Philadelphia Flyers and proceeded to the Canadian Hockey League to play for the Owen Sound Attack, of the Ontario Hockey League, under the direction of head coach Mike Stothers.

On September 14, 2015, Ružička opted to take a hiatus from professional hockey in spite of being only 30 years old. Over a calendar year later, he returned to the professional ranks in securing a contract with HC Sparta Praha of the Czech Extraliga on September 4, 2016.

== Career statistics ==
=== Regular season and playoffs ===
			Regular season					Playoffs
Season	Team	League	GP	G	A	Pts	PIM	GP	G	A	Pts	PIM
2001–02	MHC Nitra	Slovak	19	0	5	5	29	—	—	—	—	—
2002–03	MHC Nitra	SVK.2	17	5	7	12	4	—	—	—	—	—
2003–04	Owen Sound Attack	OHL	62	34	38	72	63	7	1	6	7	8
2003–04	Philadelphia Phantoms	AHL	2	0	0	0	0	3	1	0	1	2
2004–05	Owen Sound Attack	OHL	62	37	33	70	61	8	3	3	6	14
2005–06	Philadelphia Phantoms	AHL	73	16	32	48	88	—	—	—	—	—
2005–06	Philadelphia Flyers	NHL	1	0	0	0	2	—	—	—	—	—
2006–07	Philadelphia Phantoms	AHL	32	16	11	27	29	—	—	—	—	—
2006–07	Philadelphia Flyers	NHL	40	3	10	13	18	—	—	—	—	—
2007–08	Philadelphia Phantoms	AHL	59	19	31	50	105	12	4	9	13	30
2007–08	Philadelphia Flyers	NHL	14	1	3	4	27	—	—	—	—	—
2008–09	Spartak Moscow	KHL	55	18	18	36	81	6	3	4	7	6
2009–10	Spartak Moscow	KHL	56	16	20	36	72	10	3	1	4	24
2010–11	Spartak Moscow	KHL	47	17	15	32	47	4	3	0	3	2
2011–12	Spartak Moscow	KHL	53	22	18	40	67	—	—	—	—	—
2012–13	Spartak Moscow	KHL	36	8	11	19	65	—	—	—	—	—
2012–13	Salavat Yulaev Ufa	KHL	7	2	4	6	2	14	4	5	9	6
2013–14	Salavat Yulaev Ufa	KHL	7	2	2	4	6	—	—	—	—	—
2013–14	Toros Neftekamsk	VHL	6	0	2	2	2	—	—	—	—	—
2013–14	Avangard Omsk	KHL	28	10	6	16	14	—	—	—	—	—
2014–15	Lausanne HC	NLA	9	0	4	4	2	—	—	—	—	—
2014–15	HC Slovan Bratislava	KHL	11	2	2	4	12	—	—	—	—	—
2014–15	HC Oceláři Třinec	ELH	7	2	4	6	6	18	2	10	12	24
2016–17	HC Sparta Praha	ELH	16	2	8	10	31	—	—	—	—	—
AHL totals			166	51	74	125	222	15	5	9	14	32
NHL totals			55	4	13	17	47	—	—	—	—	—
KHL totals			300	97	96	193	366	34	13	10	23	38

=== International ===
Year	Team	Event	Result	GP	G	A	Pts	PIM
2002	Slovakia	WJC18	8th	8	3	0	3	2
2003	Slovakia	WJC18	2nd place, silver medalist(s)	7	5	3	8	2
2004	Slovakia	WJC	6th	6	3	3	6	2
2005	Slovakia	WJC	7th	6	3	3	6	4
2009	Slovakia	WC	10th	6	2	1	3	2
2011	Slovakia	WC	10th	5	0	1	1	2
Junior totals				27	14	9	23	10
Senior totals				11	2	2	4	4

== Awards and honours ==
Award	Year
OHL
All-Rookie Team	2004
Second all-star team	2004
