= Fyodor Astakhov =

Soviet Air Force marshal (1892–1966)

- Фёдор Алексеевич Астахов
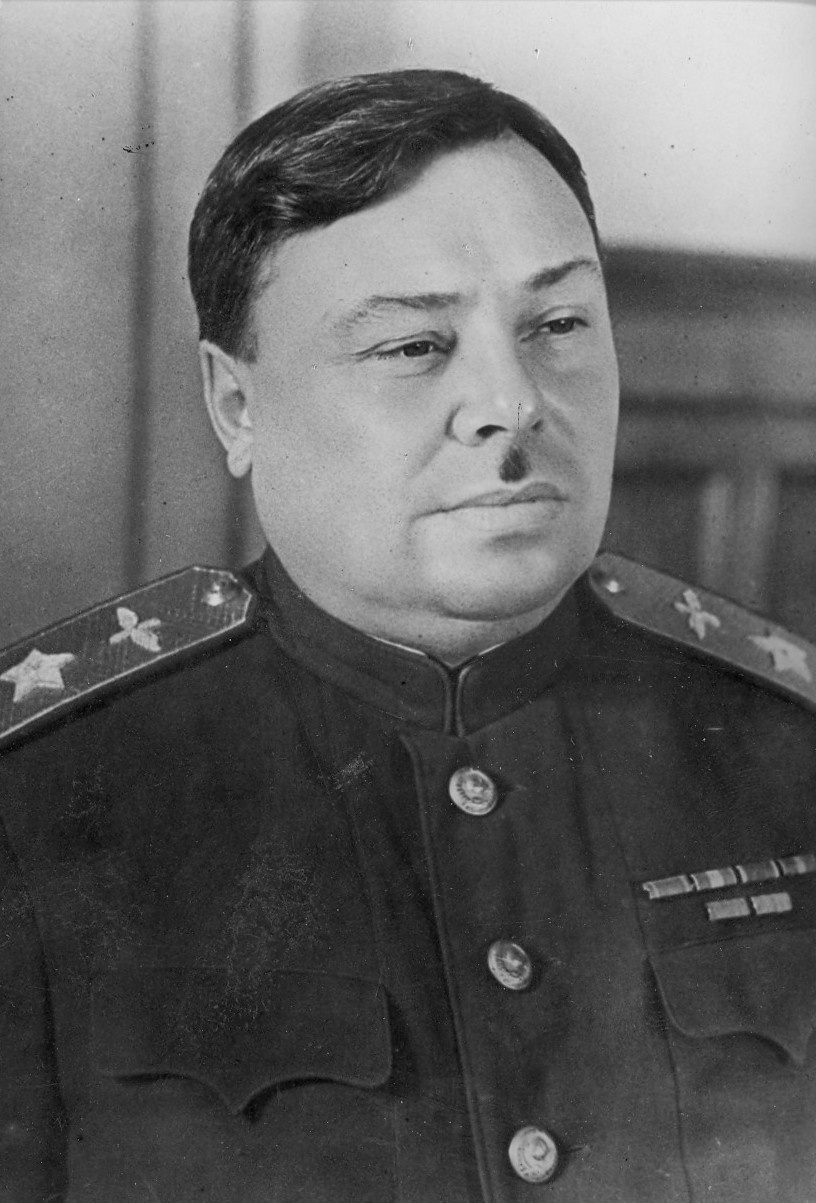
- Born: 8 February [O.S. 27 January] 1892; Ledovskie Vyselki, Kashirsky district, Tula province; now Kashirsky District, Moscow Oblast
- Died: 9 October 1966 (aged 74)
- Military career
- Rank: Marshal of Aviation
- Conflicts: World War I Russian Civil War; World War II
- Awards: Order of Lenin (2)

Fyodor Alekseyevich Astakhov (Russian: Фёдор Алексеевич Астахов; 8 February [O.S. 27 January] 1892 – 9 October 1966) was a Soviet Marshal of Aviation.

From the start of the German-Soviet War, he commanded the Air Force of the Soviet Southwestern Front. Then, from May 1942, he was chief of the Main Civil Aviation Directorate and deputy commander of the Air Force of the Red Army. Marshal Astakhov commanded civil aviation and achieved its effective use in the Battles of Stalingrad and Kursk and in other operations. From August 1943 to December 1944, he was commander of Long Range Aviation. From December 1944 to December 1947, he was again chief of the Main Civil Aviation Directorate.

== Awards ==
- Two Order of Lenin
- Three Order of the Red Banner
- Order of Kutuzov 1st class
- Order of Suvorov 1st class
- Order of the Red Star
- campaign and jubilee medals
