= Priyutovo, Bashkortostan =

Priyutovo Приютово
- Work settlement

Other transcription(s)
  - Bashkir: Приют; Priyut
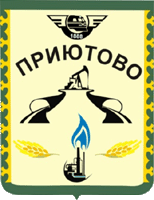
- Coat of arms
- Interactive map of Priyutovo
- Location of Priyutovo Priyutovo (Bashkortostan)
- Coordinates: 53°54′N 53°55′E
- Country: Russia
- Federal subject: Bashkortostan
- Administrative district: Belebeyevsky District
- Settlement CouncilSelsoviet: Priyutovsky Settlement Council

Population (2010 Census)
  - Total: 20,891
  - Estimate (15 January 1964): 20,300 (−2.8%)

Administrative status
  - Capital of: Priyutovsky Settlement Council

Municipal status
  - Municipal district: Belebeyevsky Municipal District
  - Urban settlement: Priyutovsky Urban Settlement
  - Capital of: Priyutovsky Urban Settlement
- Time zone: UTC+5 (MSK+2)
- Postal codes: 452017, 452018
- OKTMO ID: 80609165051

Priyutovo population
- 2010 Census: 20,891
- 2002 Census: 20,807
- 1989 Census: 19,349
- 1979 Census: 18,164

Priyutovo (Russian: Приютово; Bashkir: Приют, Priyut) is an urban locality (a work settlement) in Belebeyevsky District of the Republic of Bashkortostan, Russia. As of the 2010 Census, its population was 20,891.

== Administrative and municipal status ==
Within the framework of administrative divisions, the work settlement of Priyutovo is incorporated within Belebeyevsky District as Priyutovsky Settlement Council. As a municipal division, Priyutovsky Settlement Council is incorporated within Belebeyevsky Municipal District as Priyutovsky Urban Settlement.
