= Belebey =

Town in Bashkortostan, Russia

Belebey Белебей
- Town

Other transcription(s)
  - Bashkir: Бәләбәй
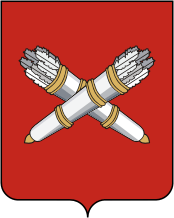
- Flag Coat of arms
- Interactive map of Belebey
- Location of Belebey Belebey (Bashkortostan)
- Coordinates: 54°06′N 54°08′E
- Country: Russia
- Federal subject: Bashkortostan
- Founded: 1715
- Town status since: 1781
- Elevation: 300 m (980 ft)

Population (2010 Census)
  - Total: 60,188
  - Estimate (2025): 58,615 (−2.6%)
  - Rank: 272nd in 2010

Administrative status
  - Subordinated to: town of republic significance of Belebey
  - Capital of: Belebeyevsky District, town of republic significance of Belebey

Municipal status
  - Municipal district: Belebeyevsky Municipal District
  - Urban settlement: Belebey Urban Settlement
  - Capital of: Belebeyevsky Municipal District, Belebey Urban Settlement
- Time zone: UTC+5 (MSK+2)
- Postal code: 452000
- OKTMO ID: 80609101001

Belebey (Russian: Белебе́й; Bashkir: Бәләбәй, romanized: Bäläbäy) is a town in the Republic of Bashkortostan, Russia, located on the bank of the Usen River, 180 kilometers (110 mi) from Ufa. Population: 60,188 (2010 census); 60,928 (2002 census); 53,443 (1989 Soviet census).

== History ==
Belebey was established in 1715 and granted town status in 1781. Between 1865 and 1919 it was part of Ufa Governorate.

== Administrative and municipal status ==
Within the framework of administrative divisions, Belebey serves as the administrative center of Belebeyevsky District, even though it is not a part of it. As an administrative division, it is incorporated separately as the town of republic significance of Belebey—an administrative unit with the status equal to that of the districts. As a municipal division, the town of republic significance of Belebey is incorporated within Belebeyevsky Municipal District as Belebey Urban Settlement.

== Demographics ==
Ethnic composition:

- Russians: 48.14%
- Tatars: 22.6%
- Bashkirs: 12.66%
- Chuvash people: 11.33%

== Climate ==
The average annual temperature is 4.1 °C (39.4 °F).
