= Belebeyevsky District =

Belebeyevsky District Белебеевский район (Russian)
- District

Other transcription(s)
  - Bashkir: Бәләбәй районы
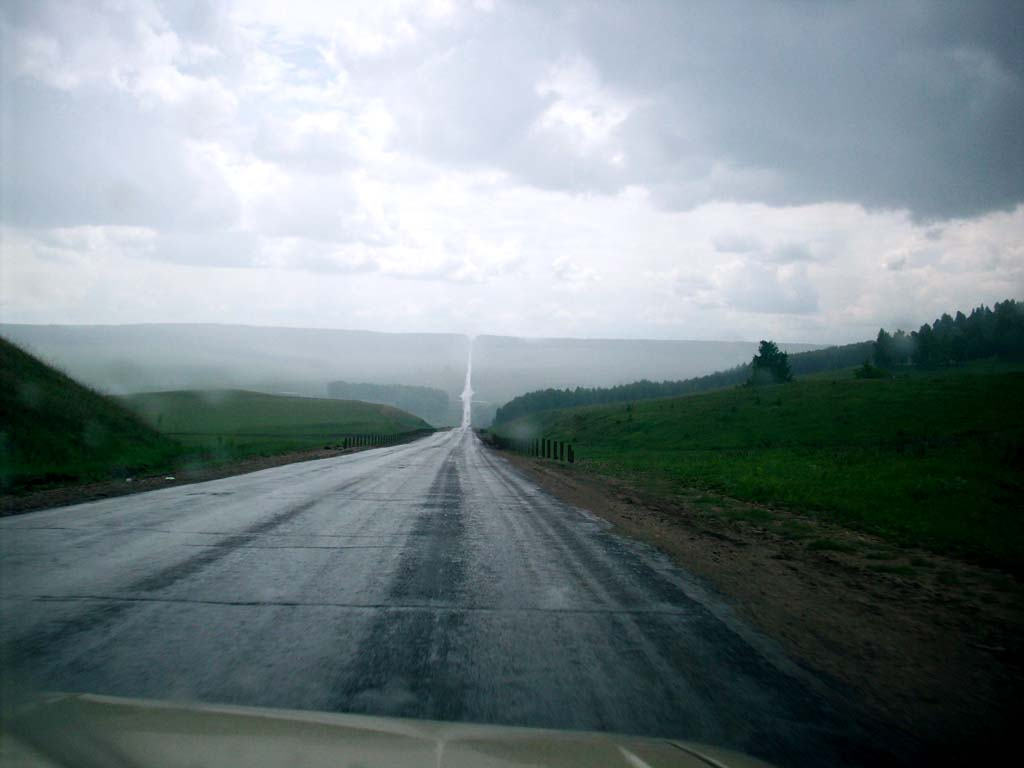
- Road in Belebeyevsky District

- Flag Coat of arms
- Location of Belebeyevsky District in the Republic of Bashkortostan
- Coordinates: 54°06′N 54°08′E
- Country: Russia
- Federal subject: Republic of Bashkortostan
- Established: 1930
- Administrative center: Belebey

Area
  - Total: 1,911.2 km^{2} (737.9 sq mi)

Population
  - Estimate (2021): 96,731

Administrative structure
  - Administrative divisions: 1 Settlement councils, 15 Selsoviets
  - Inhabited localities: 1 urban-type settlements, 88 rural localities

Municipal structure
  - Municipally incorporated as: Belebeyevsky Municipal District
  - Municipal divisions: 2 urban settlements, 15 rural settlements
- Time zone: UTC+5 (MSK+2)
- OKTMO ID: 80609000
- Website: http://www.belebey-mr.ru

Population of Belebeyevsky District
- 2010 Census: 41,708
- 2002 Census: 17,360
- 1989 Census: 16,770
- 1979 Census: 21,364

Belebeyevsky District (Russian: Белебе́евский райо́н, romanized: Belebeyevskiy rayon; Bashkir and Tatar: Бәләбәй районы, Bäläbäy rayonı; Chuvash: Пелепей районĕ, Pelepey rayonĕ) is an administrative and municipal district (raion), one of the fifty-four in the Republic of Bashkortostan, Russia. It is located in the west of the republic and borders with Tuymazinsky and Buzdyaksky Districts in the north, Davlekanovsky District in the east, Alsheyevsky District in the southeast, Bizhbulyaksky District in the south, and with Yermekeyevsky District in the west. The area of the district is 1,911.2 square kilometers (737.9 sq mi). Its administrative center is the town of Belebey (which is not administratively a part of the district). As of the 2021 Russian census, Belebeyevsky District has a population of 96,731.

== History ==
The district was established in 1930.

== Administrative and municipal status ==
Within the framework of administrative divisions, Belebeyevsky District is one of the fifty-four in the Republic of Bashkortostan. It is divided into one settlement council (with the administrative center in the work settlement of Priyutovo) and fifteen selsoviets, which comprise eighty-eight rural localities. The town of Belebey serves as the administrative center of the district, despite being incorporated separately as a town of republic significance—an administrative unit with the status equal to that of the districts.

As a municipal division, the district is incorporated as Belebeyevsky Municipal District, with the town of republic significance of Belebey being incorporated within it as Belebey Urban Settlement. The settlement council is also incorporated as an urban settlement, and the fifteen selsoviets are incorporated as fifteen rural settlements within the municipal district. The town of Belebey serves as the administrative center of the municipal district as well.

== Demographics ==
As of the 2021 Russian census, Belebeyevsky District has a population of 96,731. 45,012 people (46.53% of the total population) identified as male, while 51,719 identified as female. 78,790 people (81.45% of the total population) lived in urban areas, while 17,941 (18.55%) lived in rural areas.

2021 Russian census ethnicity data
Ethnic group	Population	Percentage
Russian	46,012	47.57%
Tatar	22,294	23.05%
Chuvash	11,573	11.96%
Bashkir	11,265	11.65%
Others	4,572	4.73%
Refused to identify	1,015	1.05%
