= Beketovo =

Beketovo may refer to the following rural localities in Russia:

- Beketovo, Karmaskalinsky District, Republic of Bashkortostan
- Beketovo, Yermekeyevsky District, Republic of Bashkortostan
- Beketovo, Cherepovetsky District, Vologda Oblast
- Beketovo, Sokolsky District, Vologda Oblast
- Beketovo, Vologodsky District, Vologda Oblast
- Beketovo, Vozhegodsky District, Vologda Oblast
