= Abdulkarimovo =

Abdulkarimovo (Russian: Абдулкаримово) is the name of several rural localities in Russia.

== Modern localities ==
- Abdulkarimovo, Alsheyevsky District, Bashkortostan, a village in Abdrashitovskiy Selsoviet of Alsheyevsky District in Bashkortostan
- Abdulkarimovo, Baymaksky District, Bashkortostan, a village in Abdulkarimovskiy Selsoviet of Baymaksky District in Bashkortostan
- Abdulkarimovo, Yermekeyevsky District, Bashkortostan, a village in Yermekeyevsky Selsoviet of Yermekeyevsky District in Bashkortostan
