= Usman-Tashly =

Usman-Tashly Усман-Ташлы
- Selo
- Location within Bashkortostan Location within Russia
- Coordinates: 54°16′N 53°33′E
- Country: Russia
- Region: Bashkortostan
- District: Yermekeyevsky District
- Time zone: UTC+5:00

Usman-Tashly (Russian: Усман-Ташлы; Bashkir: Уҫман-Ташлы, Uśman-Taşlı) is a rural locality (a selo) and the administrative centre of Usman-Tashlinsky Selsoviet, Yermekeyevsky District, Bashkortostan, Russia. The population was 541 as of 2010. There are 8 streets.

== Geography ==
Usman-Tashly is located 26 km north of Yermekeyevo (the district's administrative centre) by road. Aksakovo is the nearest rural locality.
