= Yelan-Chishma =

Yelan-Chishma Елань-Чишма
- Selo
- Location within Bashkortostan Location within Russia
- Coordinates: 54°10′N 53°49′E
- Country: Russia
- Region: Bashkortostan
- District: Yermekeyevsky District
- Time zone: UTC+5:00

Yelan-Chishma (Russian: Елань-Чишма; Bashkir: Ялан-Шишмә, Yalan-Şişmä) is a rural locality (a selo) in Sukkulovsky Selsoviet, Yermekeyevsky District, Bashkortostan, Russia. The population was 438 as of 2010. There are 12 streets.

== Geography ==
Yelan-Chishma is located 17 km northeast of Yermekeyevo (the district's administrative centre) by road. Kalinovka is the nearest rural locality.
