= Ik, Yermekeyevsky District, Republic of Bashkortostan =

Ik Ик
- Village
- Location within Bashkortostan Location within Russia
- Coordinates: 53°44′N 53°43′E
- Country: Russia
- Region: Bashkortostan
- District: Yermekeyevsky District
- Time zone: UTC+5:00

Ik (Russian: Ик; Bashkir: Ыҡ, Iq) is a rural locality (a village) in Tarkazinsky Selsoviet, Yermekeyevsky District, Bashkortostan, Russia. The population was 31 as of 2010. There is 1 street.

== Geography ==
Ik is located 52 km south of Yermekeyevo (the district's administrative centre) by road. Islambakhty is the nearest rural locality.
