= Nur, Tuymazinsky District, Republic of Bashkortostan =

Nur Нур
- Village
- Location within Bashkortostan Location within Russia
- Coordinates: 54°33′N 53°59′E
- Country: Russia
- Region: Bashkortostan
- District: Tuymazinsky District
- Time zone: UTC+5:00

Nur (Bashkir and Russian: Нур) is a rural locality (a village) in Kandrinsky Selsoviet, Tuymazinsky District, Bashkortostan, Russia. The population was 31 as of 2010. There is 1 street.

== Geography ==
Nur is located 18 km southeast of Tuymazy (the district's administrative centre) by road.
