= Novyye Sulli =

Novyye Sulli Новые Сулли
- Selo
- Location within Bashkortostan Location within Russia
- Coordinates: 54°09′N 53°36′E
- Country: Russia
- Region: Bashkortostan
- District: Yermekeyevsky District
- Time zone: UTC+5:00

Novyye Sulli (Russian: Новые Сулли; Bashkir: Яңы Сүлле, Yañı Sülle) is a rural locality (a selo) in Starosullinsky Selsoviet, Yermekeyevsky District, Bashkortostan, Russia. The population was 290 as of 2010. There are 2 streets.

== Geography ==
Novyye Sulli is located 14 km north of Yermekeyevo (the district's administrative centre) by road. Starye Sulli is the nearest rural locality.
