= Islambakhty =

Islambakhty Исламбахты
- Selo
- Location within Bashkortostan Location within Russia
- Coordinates: 53°45′N 53°43′E
- Country: Russia
- Region: Bashkortostan
- District: Yermekeyevsky District
- Time zone: UTC+5:00

Islambakhty (Russian: Исламбахты; Bashkir: Исламбаҡты, İslambaqtı) is a rural locality (a selo) in Tarkazinsky Selsoviet, Yermekeyevsky District, Bashkortostan, Russia. The population was 446 as of 2010. There are 7 streets.

== Geography ==
Islambakhty is located 49 km south of Yermekeyevo (the district's administrative centre) by road. Ik is the nearest rural locality.
