= Ablaevo, Tuymazinsky District, Bashkortostan =

Ablaevo Аблаево Аблай
- Selo
- Location within Bashkortostan Location within Russia
- Coordinates: 54°45′N 53°38′E
- Country: Russia
- Region: Bashkortostan
- District: Tuymazinsky District
- Time zone: [[UTC+5:00]]

Ablaevo (Russian: Аблаево, Bashkir: Аблай, Ablay) is a rural locality (a selo) in Kakrybashevsky Selsoviet of Tuymazinsky District, Bashkortostan, Russia. The population was 315 as of 2010. There are 2 streets.

== Geography ==
Ablaevo is located 21 km north of Tuymazy (the district's administrative centre) by road. Tukmak-Karan and Stary Karazerik are the nearest rural localities.

== Ethnicity ==
The village is inhabited by Bashkirs, Tatars and others.
