= Raymanovo =

Raymanovo may refer to:

- Raymanovo, Yermekeyevsky District, Bashkortostan, Russia
- Raymanovo, Tuymazinsky District, Bashkortostan, Russia
