= Maxyutovo, Tuymazinsky District, Republic of Bashkortostan =

Maxyutovo Максютово
- Village
- Location within Bashkortostan Location within Russia
- Coordinates: 54°34′N 53°31′E
- Country: Russia
- Region: Bashkortostan
- District: Tuymazinsky District
- Time zone: UTC+5:00

Maxyutovo (Russian: Максютово; Bashkir: Мәҡсүт, Mäqsüt) is a rural locality (a village) in Ilchimbetovsky Selsoviet, Tuymazinsky District, Bashkortostan, Russia. The population was 45 as of 2010. There is 1 street.

== Geography ==
Maxyutovo is located 15 km southwest of Tuymazy (the district's administrative centre) by road. Bakhchisaray is the nearest rural locality.
