= Chukadytamak =

Chukadytamak Чукадытамак
- Selo
- Location within Bashkortostan Location within Russia
- Coordinates: 54°21′N 54°06′E
- Country: Russia
- Region: Bashkortostan
- District: Tuymazinsky District
- Time zone: UTC+5:00

Chukadytamak (Russian: Чукадытамак; Bashkir: Соҡаҙытамаҡ, Soqaźıtamaq) is a rural locality (a selo) in Karamaly-Gubeyevsky Selsoviet, Tuymazinsky District, Bashkortostan, Russia. The population was 398 as of 2010. There are 4 streets.

== Geography ==
Chukadytamak is located 43 km southeast of Tuymazy (the district's administrative centre) by road. Karamaly-Gubeyevo is the nearest rural locality.
