= Staroturayevo =

Staroturayevo Старотураево
- Selo
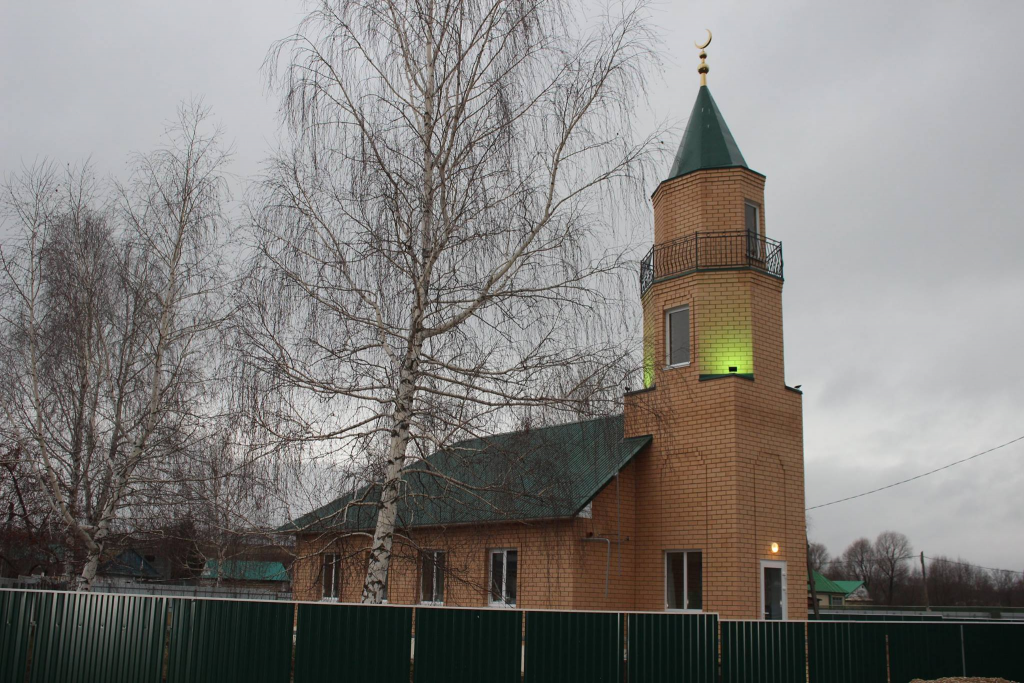
- Mosque in Staroturayevo

- Location within Bashkortostan Location within Russia
- Coordinates: 54°16′N 53°29′E
- Country: Russia
- Region: Bashkortostan
- District: Yermekeyevsky District
- Time zone: UTC+5:00

Staroturayevo (Russian: Старотураево; Bashkir: Иҫке Турай, İśke Turay) is a rural locality (a selo) and the administrative centre of Staroturayevsky Selsoviet, Yermekeyevsky District, Bashkortostan, Russia. The population was 771 as of 2010. There are 12 streets.

== Geography ==
Staroturayevo is located 31 km north of Yermekeyevo (the district's administrative centre) by road. Usman-Tashly is the nearest rural locality.
