= Yaprykovo =

Yaprykovo Япрыково
- Selo
- Location within Bashkortostan Location within Russia
- Coordinates: 54°36′N 53°31′E
- Country: Russia
- Region: Bashkortostan
- District: Tuymazinsky District
- Time zone: UTC+5:00

Yaprykovo (Russian: Япрыково; Bashkir: Япрыҡ, Yaprıq) is a rural locality (a selo) in Ilchimbetovsky Selsoviet, Tuymazinsky District, Bashkortostan, Russia. The population was 755 as of 2010. There are 13 streets.

== Geography ==
Yaprykovo is located 14 km west of Tuymazy (the district's administrative centre) by road. Baylarovo is the nearest rural locality.
