= Nizhneulu-Yelga =

Nizhneulu-Yelga Нижнеулу-Елга
- Selo
- Location within Bashkortostan Location within Russia
- Coordinates: 54°03′N 53°44′E
- Country: Russia
- Region: Bashkortostan
- District: Yermekeyevsky District
- Time zone: UTC+5:00

Nizhneulu-Yelga (Russian: Нижнеулу-Елга; Bashkir: Түбәнге Олойылға, Tübänge Oloyılğa) is a rural locality (a selo) and the administrative centre of Nizhneulu-Yelginsky Selsoviet, Yermekeyevsky District, Bashkortostan, Russia. The population was 335 as of 2010. There are 3 streets.

== Geography ==
Nizhneulu-Yelga is located 5 km southeast of Yermekeyevo (the district's administrative centre) by road. Novonikolayevka is the nearest rural locality.
