= Darvino =

Darvino Дарвино
- Village
- Location within Bashkortostan Location within Russia
- Coordinates: 54°43′N 53°45′E
- Country: Russia
- Region: Bashkortostan
- District: Tuymazinsky District
- Time zone: UTC+5:00

Darvino (Russian: Дарвино) is a rural locality (a village) in Tyumenyakovsky Selsoviet, Tuymazinsky District, Bashkortostan, Russia. The population was 138 as of 2010. There is 1 street.

== Geography ==
Darvino is located 19 km north of Tuymazy (the district's administrative centre) by road. Pokrovka is the nearest rural locality.
