= Atamkul =

Atamkul Атамкуль
- Selo
- Location within Bashkortostan Location within Russia
- Coordinates: 53°52′N 53°36′E
- Country: Russia
- Region: Bashkortostan
- District: Yermekeyevsky District
- Time zone: UTC+5:00

Atamkul (Russian: Атамкуль; Bashkir: Атамкүл, Atamkül) is a rural locality (a selo) in Tarkazinsky Selsoviet, Yermekeyevsky District, Bashkortostan, Russia. The population was 104 as of 2010. There is 1 street.

== Geography ==
Atamkul is located 42 km south of Yermekeyevo (the district's administrative centre) by road. Arkayevka is the nearest rural locality.
