= Verkhnetroitskoye, Tuymazinsky District, Republic of Bashkortostan =

Verkhnetroitskoye Верхнетроицкое
- Selo
- Location within Bashkortostan Location within Russia
- Coordinates: 54°20′N 53°46′E
- Country: Russia
- Region: Bashkortostan
- District: Tuymazinsky District
- Time zone: UTC+5:00

Verkhnetroitskoye (Russian: Верхнетроицкое) is a rural locality (a selo) and the administrative centre of Verkhnetroitsky Selsoviet, Tuymazinsky District, Bashkortostan, Russia. The population was 816 as of 2010. There are 10 streets.

== Geography ==
Verkhnetroitskoye is located 32 km south of Tuymazy (the district's administrative centre) by road. Frunze is the nearest rural locality.
