= Karat-Tamak =

Karat-Tamak Карат-Тамак
- Village
- Location within Bashkortostan Location within Russia
- Coordinates: 54°31′N 53°37′E
- Country: Russia
- Region: Bashkortostan
- District: Tuymazinsky District
- Time zone: UTC+5:00

Karat-Tamak (Russian: Карат-Тамак; Bashkir: Ҡараттамаҡ, Qarattamaq) is a rural locality (a village) in Starotuymazinsky Selsoviet, Tuymazinsky District, Bashkortostan, Russia. The population was 78 as of 2010. There are 2 streets.

== Geography ==
Karat-Tamak is located 13 km southwest of Tuymazy (the district's administrative centre) by road. Starye Tuymazy is the nearest rural locality.
