= Tiryan-Yelga =

Tiryan-Yelga Тирян-Елга
- Village
- Location within Bashkortostan Location within Russia
- Coordinates: 54°41′N 53°55′E
- Country: Russia
- Region: Bashkortostan
- District: Tuymazinsky District
- Time zone: UTC+5:00

Tiryan-Yelga (Russian: Тирян-Елга; Bashkir: Тәрәнйылға, Täränyılğa) is a rural locality (a village) in Tatar-Ulkanovsky Selsoviet, Tuymazinsky District, Bashkortostan, Russia. The population was 189 as of 2010. There is 1 street.

== Geography ==
Tiryan-Yelga is located 26 km northeast of Tuymazy (the district's administrative centre) by road. Kaznakovka is the nearest rural locality.
