= Spartak, Yermekeyevsky District, Republic of Bashkortostan =

Spartak Спартак
- Selo
- Location within Bashkortostan Location within Russia
- Coordinates: 53°58′N 53°47′E
- Country: Russia
- Region: Bashkortostan
- District: Yermekeyevsky District
- Time zone: UTC+5:00

Spartak (Russian: Спартак) is a rural locality (a selo) and the administrative centre of Spartaksky Selsoviet, Yermekeyevsky District, Bashkortostan, Russia. The population was 924 as of 2010. There are 9 streets.

== Geography ==
Spartak is located 18 km southeast of Yermekeyevo (the district's administrative centre) by road. Lyakhovo is the nearest rural locality.
