= Nizhnyaya Karan-Yelga =

Nizhnyaya Karan-Yelga Нижняя Каран-Елга
- Village
- Location within Bashkortostan Location within Russia
- Coordinates: 54°36′N 54°13′E
- Country: Russia
- Region: Bashkortostan
- District: Tuymazinsky District
- Time zone: UTC+5:00

Nizhnyaya Karan-Yelga (Russian: Нижняя Каран-Елга; Bashkir: Түбәнге Ҡаранйылға, Tübänge Qaranyılğa) is a rural locality (a village) in Kandrinsky Selsoviet, Tuymazinsky District, Bashkortostan, Russia. The population was 19 as of 2010. There is 1 street.

== Geography ==
Nizhnyaya Karan-Yelga is located 57 km east of Tuymazy (the district's administrative centre) by road. Nizhnyaya Karan-Yelga is the nearest rural locality.
