= Gorny, Tuymazinsky District, Republic of Bashkortostan =

Gorny Горный
- Village
- Location within Bashkortostan Location within Russia
- Coordinates: 54°33′N 53°35′E
- Country: Russia
- Region: Bashkortostan
- District: Tuymazinsky District
- Time zone: UTC+5:00

Gorny (Russian: Горный) is a rural locality (a village) in Starotuymazinsky Selsoviet, Tuymazinsky District, Bashkortostan, Russia. The population was 292 as of 2010. There are 6 streets.

== Geography ==
Gorny is located 10 km southwest of Tuymazy (the district's administrative centre) by road. Staryye Tuymazy is the nearest rural locality.
