= Serafimovka =

Serafimovka Серафимовка
- Selo
- Location within Bashkortostan Location within Russia
- Coordinates: 54°26′N 53°49′E
- Country: Russia
- Region: Bashkortostan
- District: Tuymazinsky District
- Time zone: UTC+5:00

Serafimovka (Russian: Серафимовка) is a rural locality (a selo) in Tuymazinsky District, Bashkortostan, Russia. The population was 209 as of 2010. There are 3 streets.

== Geography ==
Serafimovka is located 25 km southeast of Tuymazy (the district's administrative centre) by road. Serafimovsky is the nearest rural locality.
