= Semeno-Makarovo =

Semeno-Makarovo Семено-Макарово
- Selo
- Location within Bashkortostan Location within Russia
- Coordinates: 54°05′N 53°48′E
- Country: Russia
- Region: Bashkortostan
- District: Yermekeyevsky District
- Time zone: UTC+5:00

Semeno-Makarovo (Russian: Семено-Макарово; Bashkir: Семен-Макар, Semen-Makar) is a rural locality (a selo) in Yermekeyevsky Selsoviet, Yermekeyevsky District, Bashkortostan, Russia. The population was 332 as of 2010. There are 4 streets.

== Geography ==
Semeno-Makarovo is located 12 km northeast of Yermekeyevo (the district's administrative centre) by road. Vasilyevka is the nearest rural locality.
