= Urmekeyevo =

Urmekeyevo Урмекеево
- Selo
- Location within Bashkortostan Location within Russia
- Coordinates: 54°32′N 54°12′E
- Country: Russia
- Region: Bashkortostan
- District: Tuymazinsky District
- Time zone: UTC+5:00

Urmekeyevo (Russian: Урмекеево; Bashkir: Үрмәкәй, Ürmäkäy) is a rural locality (a selo) in Sayranovsky Selsoviet, Tuymazinsky District, Bashkortostan, Russia. The population was 315 as of 2010. There are 3 streets.

== Geography ==
Urmekeyevo is located 49 km southeast of Tuymazy (the district's administrative centre) by road. Tyupkildy is the nearest rural locality.
