= Taldy-Bulak, Republic of Bashkortostan =

Taldy-Bulak Талды-Булак
- Village
- Location within Bashkortostan Location within Russia
- Coordinates: 53°46′N 53°48′E
- Country: Russia
- Region: Bashkortostan
- District: Yermekeyevsky District
- Time zone: UTC+5:00

Taldy-Bulak (Russian: Талды-Булак; Bashkir: Талдыболаҡ, Taldıbolaq) is a rural locality (a village) in Vosmomartovsky Selsoviet, Yermekeyevsky District, Bashkortostan, Russia. The population was 44 as of 2010. There are 3 streets.

== Geography ==
Taldy-Bulak is located 72 km south of Yermekeyevo (the district's administrative centre) by road. Novoshakovo is the nearest rural locality.
