= Metevtamak =

Metevtamak Метевтамак
- Selo
- Location within Bashkortostan Location within Russia
- Coordinates: 54°18′N 54°07′E
- Country: Russia
- Region: Bashkortostan
- District: Tuymazinsky District
- Time zone: UTC+5:00

Metevtamak (Russian: Метевтамак; Bashkir: Мәтәүтамаҡ, Mätäwtamaq) is a rural locality (a selo) in Karamaly-Gubeyevsky Selsoviet, Tuymazinsky District, Bashkortostan, Russia. The population was 457 as of 2010. There are 4 streets.

== Geography ==
Metevtamak is located 46 km southeast of Tuymazy (the district's administrative centre) by road. Kalshaly is the nearest rural locality.
