= Tatar-Ulkanovo =

Tatar-Ulkanovo Татар-Улканово
- Selo
- Location within Bashkortostan Location within Russia
- Coordinates: 54°37′N 53°53′E
- Country: Russia
- Region: Bashkortostan
- District: Tuymazinsky District
- Time zone: UTC+5:00

Tatar-Ulkanovo (Russian: Татар-Улканово; Bashkir: Татар-Олҡан, Tatar-Olqan) is a rural locality (a selo) and the administrative centre of Tatar-Ulkanovsky Selsoviet, Tuymazinsky District, Bashkortostan, Russia. The population was 691 as of 2010. There are 16 streets.

== Geography ==
Tatar-Ulkanovo is located 17 km east of Tuymazy (the district's administrative centre) by road. Chuvash-Ulkanovo is the nearest rural locality.
