= Staryye Tuymazy =

Staryye Tuymazy Старые Туймазы
- Selo
- Location within Bashkortostan Location within Russia
- Coordinates: 54°32′N 53°36′E
- Country: Russia
- Region: Bashkortostan
- District: Tuymazinsky District
- Time zone: UTC+5:00

Staryye Tuymazy (Russian: Старые Туймазы; Bashkir: Иҫке Туймазы, İśke Tuymazı) is a rural locality (a selo) and the administrative centre of Starotuymazinsky Selsoviet, Tuymazinsky District, Bashkortostan, Russia. The population was 1,247 as of 2010. There are 29 streets.

== Geography ==
Staryye Tuymazy is located 10 km southwest of Tuymazy (the district's administrative centre) by road. Gorny is the nearest rural locality.
