= Novosukkulovo =

Novosukkulovo Новосуккулово
- Village
- Location within Bashkortostan Location within Russia
- Coordinates: 54°29′N 53°55′E
- Country: Russia
- Region: Bashkortostan
- District: Tuymazinsky District
- Time zone: UTC+5:00

Novosukkulovo (Russian: Новосуккулово; Bashkir: Яңы Һыуыҡҡул, Yañı Hıwıqqul) is a rural locality (a village) in Nikolayevsky Selsoviet, Tuymazinsky District, Bashkortostan, Russia. The population was 18 as of 2010. There is 1 street.

== Geography ==
Novosukkulovo is located 23 km southeast of Tuymazy (the district's administrative centre) by road. Kendektamak is the nearest rural locality.
