= Kuyutamak =

Kuyutamak Куюктамак
- Village
- Location within Bashkortostan Location within Russia
- Coordinates: 54°27′N 53°37′E
- Country: Russia
- Region: Bashkortostan
- District: Tuymazinsky District
- Time zone: UTC+5:00

Kuyutamak (Russian: Куюктамак; Bashkir: Көйөктамаҡ, Köyöktamaq) is a rural locality (a village) in Verkhnebishindinsky Selsoviet, Tuymazinsky District, Bashkortostan, Russia. The population was 42 as of 2010. There are 2 streets.

== Geography ==
Kuyutamak is located 29 km southwest of Tuymazy (the district's administrative centre) by road. Imangulovo is the nearest rural locality.
