= Nizhniye Bishindy =

Nizhniye Bishindy Нижние Бишинды
- Selo
- Location within Bashkortostan Location within Russia
- Coordinates: 54°29′N 53°44′E
- Country: Russia
- Region: Bashkortostan
- District: Tuymazinsky District
- Time zone: UTC+5:00

Nizhniye Bishindy (Russian: Нижние Бишинды; Bashkir: Түбәнге Бишенде, Tübänge Bişende) is a rural locality (a selo) in Verkhnebishindinsky Selsoviet, Tuymazinsky District, Bashkortostan, Russia. The population was 744 as of 2010. There are 9 streets.

== Geography ==
Nizhniye Bishindy is located 14 km south of Tuymazy (the district's administrative centre) by road. Verkhniye Bishindy is the nearest rural locality.
