= Ilchimbetovo =

Ilchimbetovo Ильчимбетово
- Selo
- Location within Bashkortostan Location within Russia
- Coordinates: 54°38′N 53°34′E
- Country: Russia
- Region: Bashkortostan
- District: Tuymazinsky District
- Time zone: UTC+5:00

Ilchimbetovo (Russian: Ильчимбетово; Bashkir: Илсембәт, İlsembät) is a rural locality (a selo) and the administrative centre of Ilchimbetovsky Selsoviet, Tuymazinsky District, Bashkortostan, Russia. The population was 1,067 as of 2010. There are 16 streets.

== Geography ==
Ilchimbetovo is located 12 km northwest of Tuymazy (the district's administrative centre) by road. Bayrakatuba is the nearest rural locality.
