= Knyazevka, Yermekeyevsky District, Republic of Bashkortostan =

Knyazevka Князевка
- Village
- Location within Bashkortostan Location within Russia
- Coordinates: 54°15′N 53°41′E
- Country: Russia
- Region: Bashkortostan
- District: Yermekeyevsky District
- Time zone: UTC+5:00

Knyazevka (Russian: Князевка) is a rural locality (a village) in Sukkulovsky Selsoviet, Yermekeyevsky District, Bashkortostan, Russia. The population was 59 as of 2010. There is 1 street.

== Geography ==
Knyazevka is located 25 km north of Yermekeyevo (the district's administrative centre) by road. Bogorodsky is the nearest rural locality.
