= Kalinovka, Yermekeyevsky District, Republic of Bashkortostan =

Kalinovka Калиновка
- Village
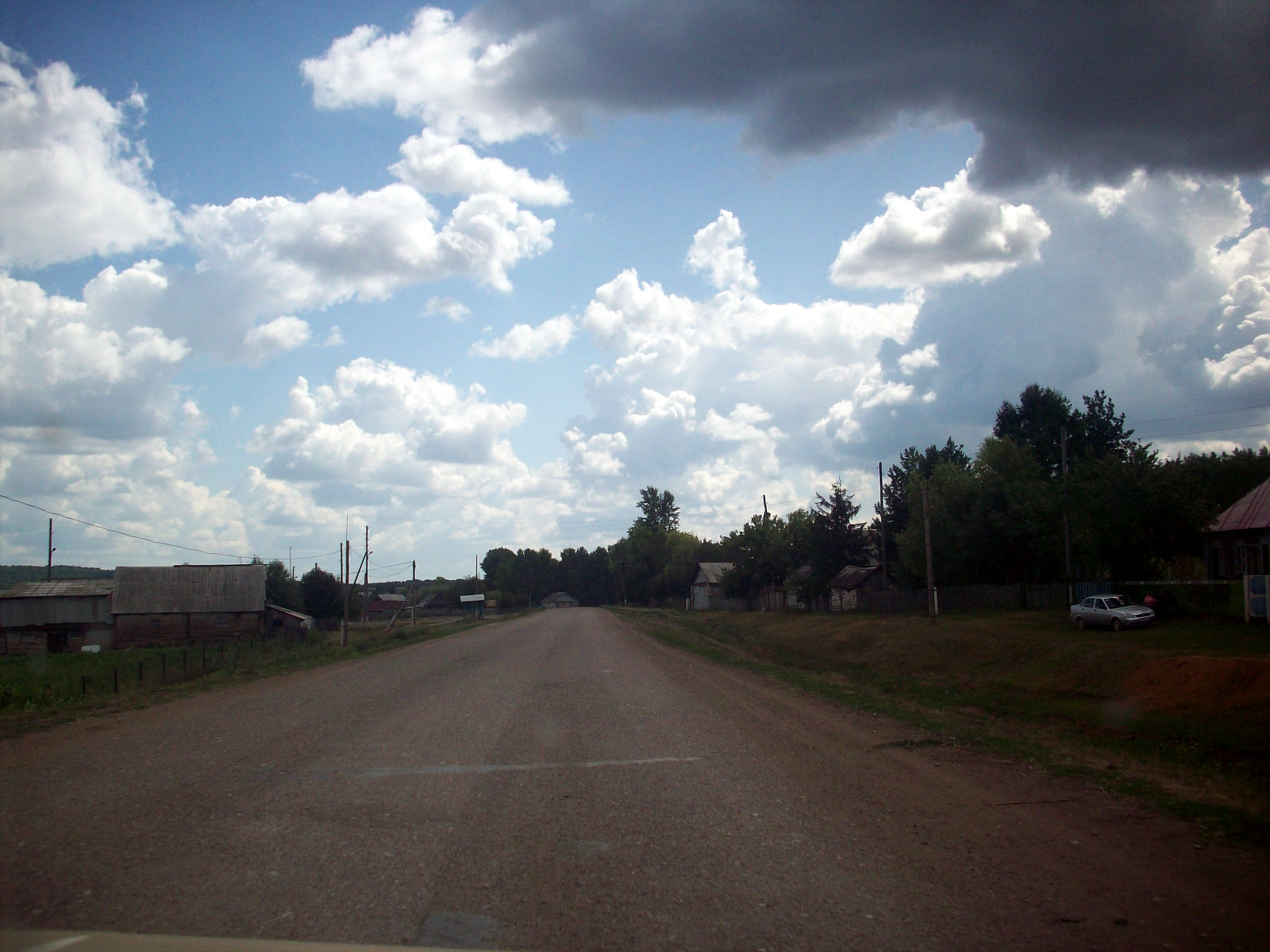

- Location within Bashkortostan Location within Russia
- Coordinates: 54°11′N 53°46′E
- Country: Russia
- Region: Bashkortostan
- District: Yermekeyevsky District
- Time zone: UTC+5:00

Kalinovka (Russian: Калиновка) is a rural locality (a village) in Sukkulovsky Selsoviet, Yermekeyevsky District, Bashkortostan, Russia. The population was 67 as of 2010. There is 1 street.

== Geography ==
Kalinovka is located 20 km northeast of Yermekeyevo (the district's administrative centre) by road. Yelan-Chishma is the nearest rural locality.
