= Kandry =

Kandry Кандры
- Selo
- Location within Bashkortostan Location within Russia
- Coordinates: 54°33′N 54°06′E
- Country: Russia
- Region: Bashkortostan
- District: Tuymazinsky District
- Time zone: UTC+5:00

Kandry (Russian: Кандры; Bashkir: Ҡандра, Qandra) is a rural locality (a selo) in Kandrinsky Selsoviet, Tuymazinsky District, Bashkortostan, Russia. The population was 10,885 as of 2010. There are 76 streets.

== Geography ==
Kandry is located 40 km southeast of Tuymazy (the district's administrative centre) by road. Starye Kandry is the nearest rural locality.
