= Bishkurayevo, Tuymazinsky District, Republic of Bashkortostan =

Bishkurayevo Бишкураево
- Selo
- Location within Bashkortostan Location within Russia
- Coordinates: 54°40′N 54°10′E
- Country: Russia
- Region: Bashkortostan
- District: Tuymazinsky District
- Time zone: UTC+5:00

Bishkurayevo (Russian: Бишкураево; Bashkir: Бишҡурай, Bişquray) is a rural locality (a selo) and the administrative centre of Bishkurayevsky Selsoviet, Tuymazinsky District, Bashkortostan, Russia. The population was 680 as of 2010. There are 7 streets.

== Geography ==
Bishkurayevo is located 39 km east of Tuymazy (the district's administrative centre) by road. Yermunchino is the nearest rural locality.
