= Yakshayevo =

Yakshayevo Якшаево
- Village
- Location within Bashkortostan Location within Russia
- Coordinates: 54°18′N 53°26′E
- Country: Russia
- Region: Bashkortostan
- District: Tuymazinsky District
- Time zone: UTC+5:00

Yakshayevo (Russian: Якшаево; Bashkir: Яҡшай, Yaqşay) is a rural locality (a village) in Karatovsky Selsoviet, Tuymazinsky District, Bashkortostan, Russia. The population was 85 as of 2010. There are 2 streets.

== Geography ==
Yakshayevo is located 45 km southwest of Tuymazy (the district's administrative centre) by road. Kozhay-Andreyevo is the nearest rural locality.
