= Atyk =

Atyk Атык
- Village
- Location within Bashkortostan Location within Russia
- Coordinates: 54°36′N 54°16′E
- Country: Russia
- Region: Bashkortostan
- District: Tuymazinsky District
- Time zone: UTC+5:00

Atyk (Russian: Атык; Bashkir: Әтек, Ätek) is a rural locality (a village) in Bishkurayevsky Selsoviet, Tuymazinsky District, Bashkortostan, Russia. The population was 37 as of 2010. There is 1 street.

== Geography ==
Atyk is located 53 km east of Tuymazy (the district's administrative centre) by road. Yulduzly is the nearest rural locality.
