= Tash-Kichu =

Tash-Kichu Таш-Кичу
- Village
- Location within Bashkortostan Location within Russia
- Coordinates: 54°44′N 53°47′E
- Country: Russia
- Region: Bashkortostan
- District: Tuymazinsky District
- Time zone: UTC+5:00

Tash-Kichu (Russian: Таш-Кичу; Bashkir: Ташкисеү, Taşkisew) is a rural locality (a village) in Tyumenyakovsky Selsoviet, Tuymazinsky District, Bashkortostan, Russia. The population was 53 as of 2010. There is one street.

== Geography ==
Tash-Kichu is located 21 km north of Tuymazy (the district's administrative centre) by road. Pokrovka is the nearest rural locality.
