= Bulat, Tuymazinsky District, Republic of Bashkortostan =

Bulat Булат
- Village
- Location within Bashkortostan Location within Russia
- Coordinates: 54°39′N 54°06′E
- Country: Russia
- Region: Bashkortostan
- District: Tuymazinsky District
- Time zone: UTC+5:00

Bulat (Bashkir and Russian: Булат) is a rural locality (a village) in Bishkurayevsky Selsoviet, Tuymazinsky District, Bashkortostan, Russia. The population was 266 as of 2010. There are 2 streets.

== Geography ==
Bulat is located 35 km east of Tuymazy (the district's administrative centre) by road. Tuktagulovo is the nearest rural locality.
