= Novoyermekeyevo =

Novoyermekeyevo Новоермекеево
- Village
- Location within Bashkortostan Location within Russia
- Coordinates: 53°57′N 53°41′E
- Country: Russia
- Region: Bashkortostan
- District: Yermekeyevsky District
- Time zone: UTC+5:00

Novoyermekeyevo (Russian: Новоермекеево; Bashkir: Яңы Йәрмәкәй, Yañı Yärmäkäy) is a rural locality (a village) in Spartaksky Selsoviet, Yermekeyevsky District, Bashkortostan, Russia. The population was 85 as of 2010. There is 1 street.

== Geography ==
Novoyermekeyevo is located 19 km south of Yermekeyevo (the district's administrative centre) by road. Pionersky is the nearest rural locality.
