= Tyupkildy =

Tyupkildy Тюпкильды
- Selo
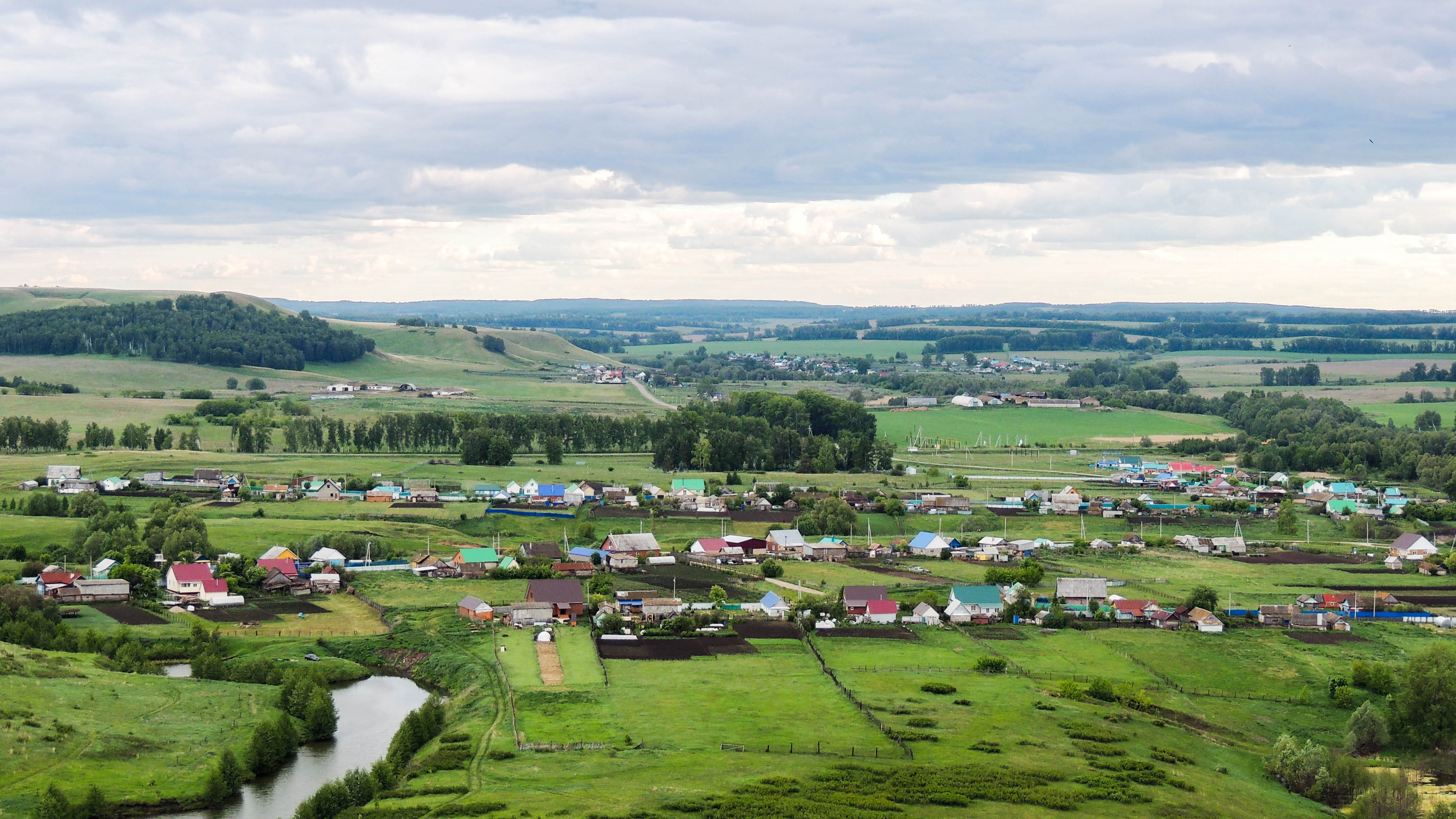
- Tyupkildy, 2018

- Location within Bashkortostan Location within Russia
- Coordinates: 54°34′N 54°14′E
- Country: Russia
- Region: Bashkortostan
- District: Tuymazinsky District
- Time zone: UTC+5:00

Tyupkildy (Russian: Тюпкильды; Bashkir: Төпкилде, Töpkilde) is a rural locality (a selo) in Sayranovsky Selsoviet, Tuymazinsky District, Bashkortostan, Russia. The population was 209 as of 2010. There are five streets.

== Geography ==
Tyupkildy is located 46 km southeast of Tuymazy (the district's administrative centre) by road. Urmekeyevo is the nearest rural locality.
