= Urnyak, Tuymazinsky District, Republic of Bashkortostan =

Urnyak Урняк
- Village
- Location within Bashkortostan Location within Russia
- Coordinates: 54°28′N 54°14′E
- Country: Russia
- Region: Bashkortostan
- District: Tuymazinsky District
- Time zone: UTC+5:00

Urnyak (Russian: Урняк; Bashkir: Үрнәк, Ürnäk) is a rural locality (a village) in Sayranovsky Selsoviet, Tuymazinsky District, Bashkortostan, Russia. The population was 7 as of 2010. There is 1 street.

== Geography ==
Urnyak is located 49 km southeast of Tuymazy (the district's administrative centre) by road. Sayranovo is the nearest rural locality.
