= Nizhnetroitsky =

Nizhnetroitsky Нижнетроицкий
- Selo
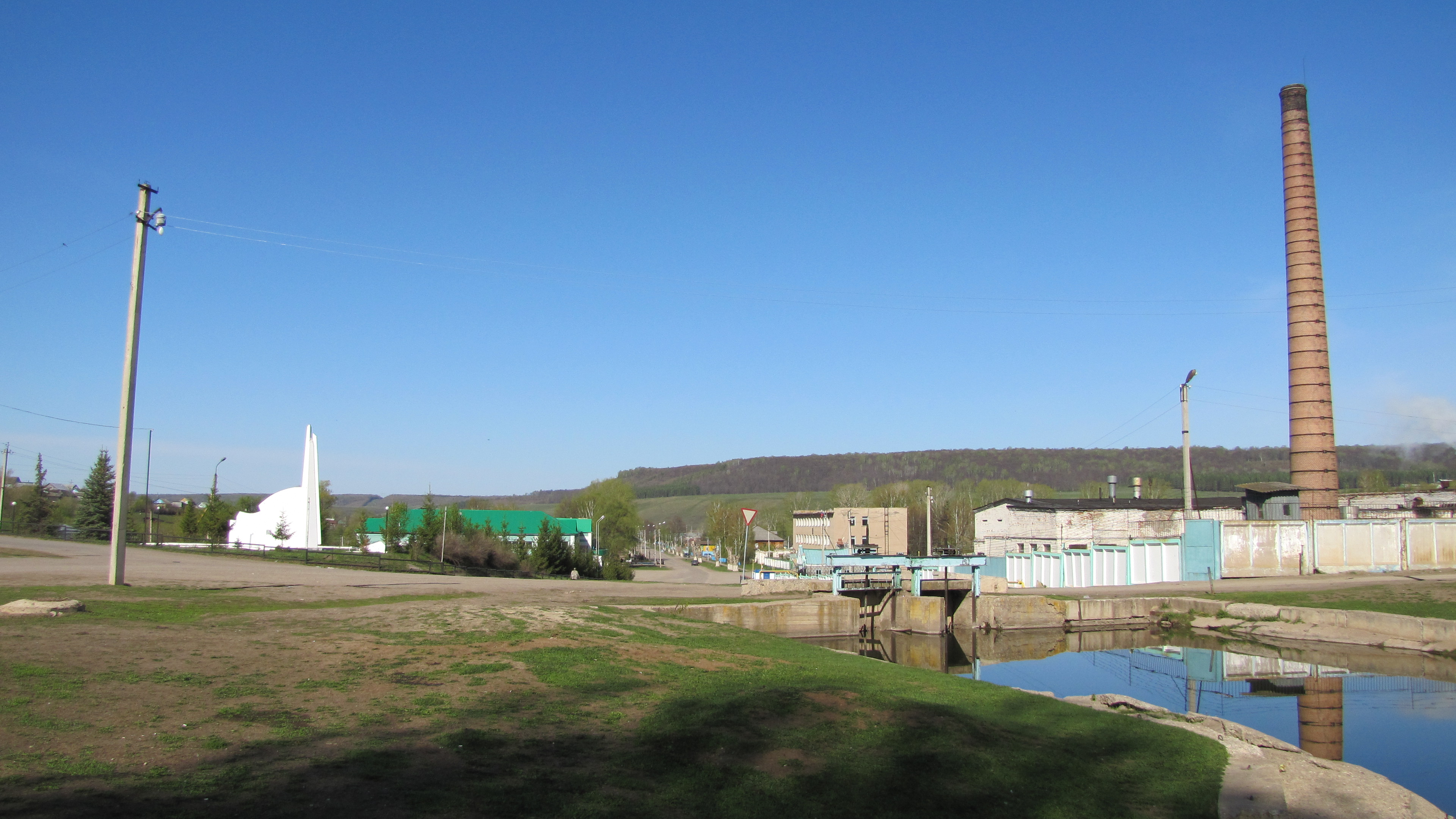

- Location within Bashkortostan Location within Russia
- Coordinates: 54°20′N 53°41′E
- Country: Russia
- Region: Bashkortostan
- District: Tuymazinsky District
- Time zone: UTC+5:00

Nizhnetroitsky (Russian: Нижнетроицкий) is a rural locality (a selo) and the administrative centre of Nizhnetroitsky Selsoviet, Tuymazinsky District, Bashkortostan, Russia. The population was 4,008 as of 2010. There are 12 streets.

== Geography ==
Nizhnetroitsky is located 38 km south of Tuymazy (the district's administrative centre) by road. Verkhnetroitskoye is the nearest rural locality.
