= Kalshali =

Kalshali Кальшали
- Selo
- Location within Bashkortostan Location within Russia
- Coordinates: 54°18′N 54°03′E
- Country: Russia
- Region: Bashkortostan
- District: Tuymazinsky District
- Time zone: UTC+5:00

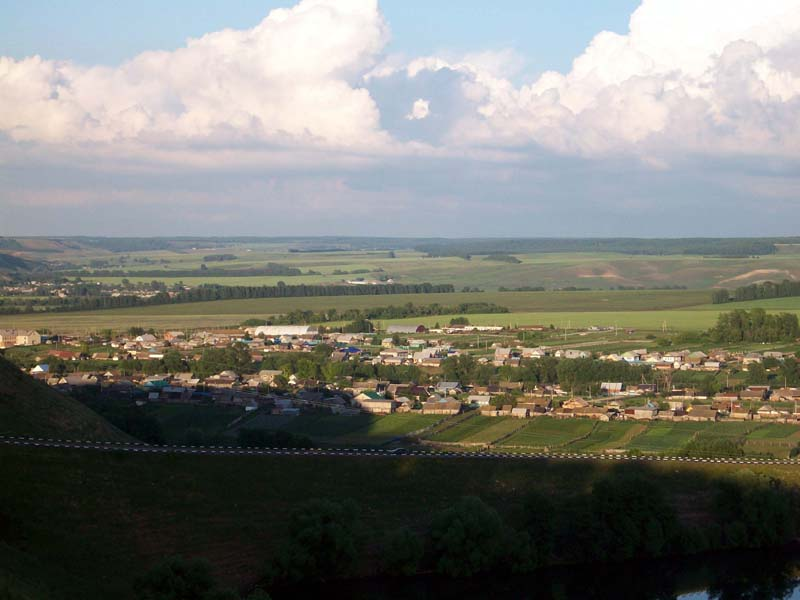

Kalshali (Russian: Кальшали; Bashkir: Кәлшәле, Kälşäle) is a rural locality (a selo) in Karamaly-Gubeyevsky Selsoviet, Tuymazinsky District, Bashkortostan, Russia. The population was 525 as of 2010. There are 6 streets.

== Geography ==
Kalshali is located 44 km southeast of Tuymazy (the district's administrative centre) by road. Metevtamak is the nearest rural locality.
