= Serafimovsky =

Serafimovsky Серафимовский
- Selo
- Location within Bashkortostan Location within Russia
- Coordinates: 54°25′N 53°47′E
- Country: Russia
- Region: Bashkortostan
- District: Tuymazinsky District
- Time zone: UTC+5:00

Serafimovsky (Russian: Серафимовский) is a rural locality (a selo) and the administrative centre of Serafimovsky Selsoviet, Tuymazinsky District, Bashkortostan, Russia. The population was 9,813 as of 2010. There are 67 streets.

== Geography ==
Serafimovsky is located 23 km south of Tuymazy (the district's administrative centre) by road. Serafimovka is the nearest rural locality.
