= Karamaly-Gubeyevo =

Karamaly-Gubeyevo Карамалы-Губеево
- Selo
- Location within Bashkortostan Location within Russia
- Coordinates: 54°21′N 54°03′E
- Country: Russia
- Region: Bashkortostan
- District: Tuymazinsky District
- Time zone: UTC+5:00

Karamaly-Gubeyevo (Russian: Карамалы-Губеево; Bashkir: Ҡарамалы-Ғөбәй, Qaramalı-Ğöbäy) is a rural locality (a selo) and the administrative centre of Karamaly-Gubeyevsky Selsoviet, Tuymazinsky District, Bashkortostan, Russia. The population was 1,120 as of 2010. There are 14 streets.

== Geography ==
Karamaly-Gubeyevo is located 39 km southeast of Tuymazy (the district's administrative centre) by road. Chukadytamak is the nearest rural locality.
