= Chukadybashevo =

Chukadybashevo Чукадыбашево
- Selo
- Location within Bashkortostan Location within Russia
- Coordinates: 54°24′N 54°09′E
- Country: Russia
- Region: Bashkortostan
- District: Tuymazinsky District
- Time zone: UTC+5:00

Chukadybashevo (Russian: Чукадыбашево; Bashkir: Соҡаҙыбаш, Soqaźıbaş) is a rural locality (a selo) in Chukadybashevsky Selsoviet, Tuymazinsky District, Bashkortostan, Russia. The population was 359 as of 2010. There are 2 streets.

== Geography ==
Chukadybashevo is located 50 km southeast of Tuymazy (the district's administrative centre) by road. Kamyshtau is the nearest rural locality.
