= Pionersky, Yermekeyevsky District, Republic of Bashkortostan =

Pionersky Пионерский
- Selo
- Location within Bashkortostan Location within Russia
- Coordinates: 53°58′N 53°45′E
- Country: Russia
- Region: Bashkortostan
- District: Yermekeyevsky District
- Time zone: UTC+5:00

Pionersky (Russian: Пионерский) is a rural locality (a selo) in Spartaksky Selsoviet, Yermekeyevsky District, Bashkortostan, Russia. The population was 220 as of 2010. There is 1 street.

== Geography ==
Pionersky is located 15 km southeast of Yermekeyevo (the district's administrative centre) by road. Spartak is the nearest rural locality.
