= Tarkazy =

Tarkazy Тарказы
- Selo
- Location within Bashkortostan Location within Russia
- Coordinates: 53°50′N 53°38′E
- Country: Russia
- Region: Bashkortostan
- District: Yermekeyevsky District
- Time zone: UTC+5:00

Tarkazy (Russian: Тарказы; Bashkir: Тарҡаҙы, Tarqaźı) is a rural locality (a selo) and the administrative centre of Tarkazinsky Selsoviet, Yermekeyevsky District, Bashkortostan, Russia. The population was 731 as of 2010. There are 5 streets.

== Geography ==
Tarkazy is located 37 km south of Yermekeyevo (the district's administrative centre) by road. Novotroyevka is the nearest rural locality.
