= Adnagulovo =

Adnagulovo Аднагулово
- Selo
- Location within Bashkortostan Location within Russia
- Coordinates: 54°35′N 53°53′E
- Country: Russia
- Region: Bashkortostan
- District: Tuymazinsky District
- Time zone: UTC+5:00

Adnagulovo (Russian: Аднагулово; Bashkir: Аҙнағол, Aźnağol) is a rural locality (a selo) in Tatar-Ulkanovsky Selsoviet, Tuymazinsky District, Bashkortostan, Russia. The population was 258 as of 2010. There are 4 streets.

== Geography ==
Adnagulovo is located 17 km southeast of Tuymazy (the district's administrative centre) by road. Kain-Yelga is the nearest rural locality.
