= Nizhny Sardyk =

Nizhny Sardyk Нижний Сардык
- Village
- Location within Bashkortostan Location within Russia
- Coordinates: 54°36′N 53°58′E
- Country: Russia
- Region: Bashkortostan
- District: Tuymazinsky District
- Time zone: UTC+5:00

Nizhny Sardyk (Russian: Нижний Сардык; Bashkir: Түбәнге Сәрҙек, Tübänge Särźek) is a rural locality (a village) in Tatar-Ulkanovsky Selsoviet, Tuymazinsky District, Bashkortostan, Russia. The population was 209 as of 2010. There are 2 streets.

== Geography ==
Nizhny Sardyk is located 23 km east of Tuymazy (the district's administrative centre) by road. Verkhny Sardyk is the nearest rural locality.
