= Selo imeni 8 Marta =

Selo imeni 8 Marta Село имени 8 Марта
- Selo
- Location within Bashkortostan Location within Russia
- Coordinates: 53°53′N 53°45′E
- Country: Russia
- Region: Bashkortostan
- District: Yermekeyevsky District
- Time zone: UTC+5:00

Selo imeni 8 Marta (Russian: Село имени 8 Марта; Bashkir: 8-се Март исемендәге ауыл, 8-se Mart isemendäge awıl) is a rural locality (a selo) and the administrative centre of Vosmomartovsky Selsoviet, Yermekeyevsky District, Bashkortostan, Russia. The population was 778 as of 2010.

== Geography ==
Selo imeni 8 Marta is located 33 km south of Yermekeyevo (the district's administrative centre) by road. Gorodetskoye is the nearest rural locality.
