= Rayevka, Tuymazinsky District, Republic of Bashkortostan =

Rayevka Раевка
- Village
- Location within Bashkortostan Location within Russia
- Coordinates: 54°35′N 53°36′E
- Country: Russia
- Region: Bashkortostan
- District: Tuymazinsky District
- Time zone: UTC+5:00

Rayevka (Russian: Раевка) is a rural locality (a village) in Starotuymazinsky Selsoviet, Tuymazinsky District, Bashkortostan, Russia. The population was 101 as of 2010. There are 3 streets.

== Geography ==
Rayevka is located 10 km southwest of Tuymazy (the district's administrative centre) by road. Kyzyl-Bulyak is the nearest rural locality.
