= Gafurovo =

Gafurovo Гафурово
- Selo
- Location within Bashkortostan Location within Russia
- Coordinates: 54°31′N 53°41′E
- Country: Russia
- Region: Bashkortostan
- District: Tuymazinsky District
- Time zone: UTC+5:00

Gafurovo (Russian: Гафурово; Bashkir: Ғәфүр, Ğäfür) is a rural locality (a selo) in Gafurovsky Selsoviet, Tuymazinsky District, Bashkortostan, Russia. The population was 1,083 as of 2010. There are 25 streets.

== Geography ==
Gafurovo is located 9 km south of Tuymazy (the district's administrative centre) by road. Timirovo is the nearest rural locality.
