= Kandry-Tyumekeyevo =

Kandry-Tyumekeyevo Кандры-Тюмекеево
- Village
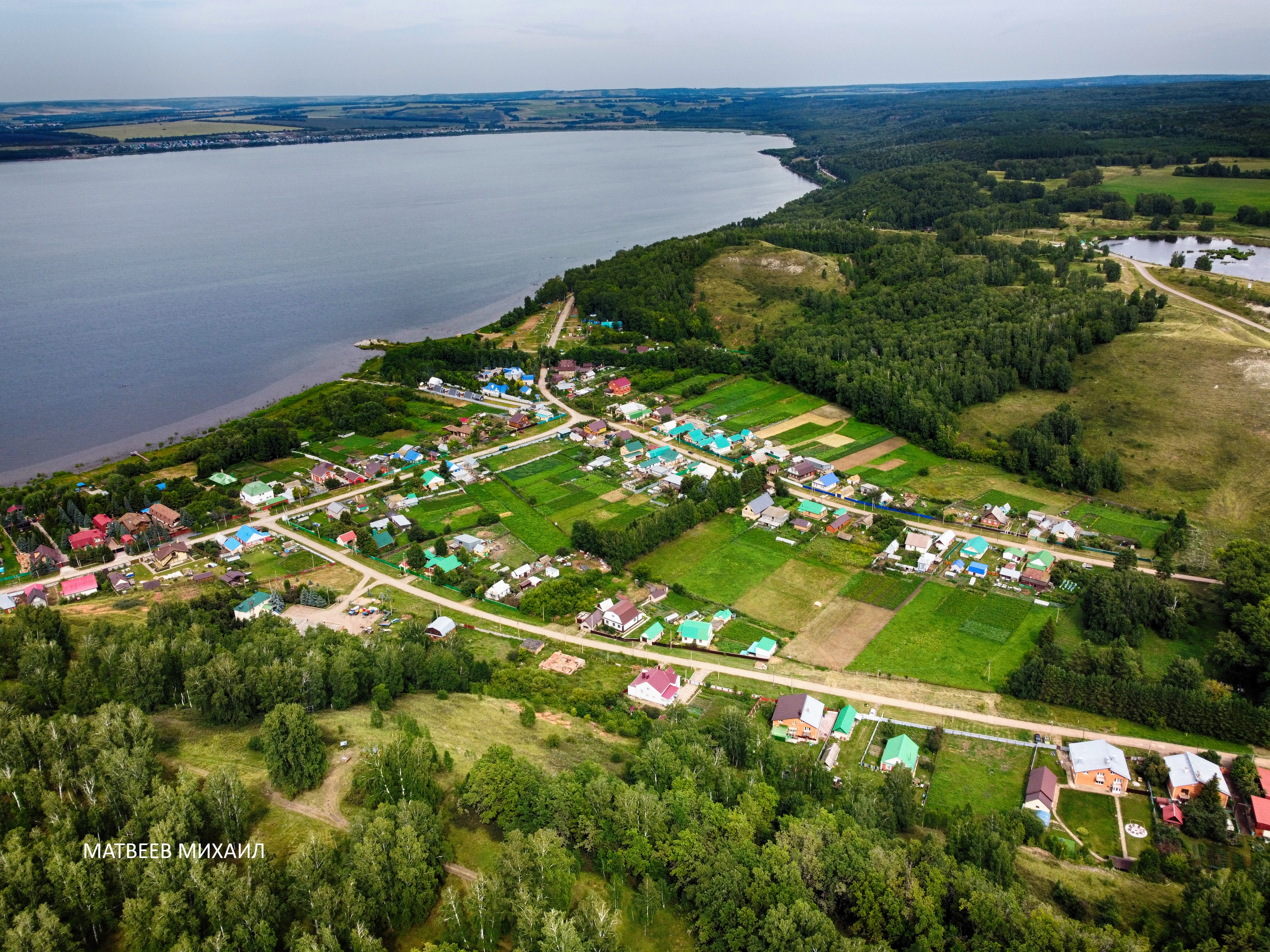
- Kandry-Tyumekeyevo

- Location within Bashkortostan Location within Russia
- Coordinates: 54°28′N 54°03′E
- Country: Russia
- Region: Bashkortostan
- District: Tuymazinsky District
- Time zone: UTC+5:00

Kandry-Tyumekeyevo (Russian: Кандры-Тюмекеево; Bashkir: Ҡандра-Төмәкәй, Qandra-Tömäkäy) is a rural locality (a village) in Nikolayevsky Selsoviet, Tuymazinsky District, Bashkortostan, Russia. The population was 135 as of 2010. There are 2 streets.

== Geography ==
Kandry-Tyumekeyevo is located 33 km southeast of Tuymazy (the district's administrative centre) by road. Kandrykul is the nearest rural locality.
