= Kozhay-Maximovo =

Kozhay-Maximovo Кожай-Максимово
- Selo
- Location within Bashkortostan Location within Russia
- Coordinates: 53°52′N 54°01′E
- Country: Russia
- Region: Bashkortostan
- District: Yermekeyevsky District
- Time zone: UTC+5:00

Kozhay-Maximovo (Russian: Кожай-Максимово) is a rural locality (a selo) in Beketovsky Selsoviet, Yermekeyevsky District, Bashkortostan, Russia. The population was 6 as of 2010. There is 1 street.

== Geography ==
Kozhay-Maximovo is located 41 km southeast of Yermekeyevo (the district's administrative centre) by road. Kozhay-Ikskiye Vershiny is the nearest rural locality.
