= Suyermetovo =

Suyermetovo Суерметово
- Selo
- Location within Bashkortostan Location within Russia
- Coordinates: 54°06′N 53°29′E
- Country: Russia
- Region: Bashkortostan
- District: Yermekeyevsky District
- Time zone: UTC+5:00

Suyermetovo (Russian: Суерметово; Bashkir: Сөйәрмәт, Söyärmät) is a rural locality (a selo) and the administrative centre of Kyzyl-Yarsky Selsoviet, Yermekeyevsky District, Bashkortostan, Russia. The population was 166 as of 2010. There is 1 street.

== Geography ==
Suyermetovo is located 15 km northwest of Yermekeyevo (the district's administrative centre) by road. Shalty is the nearest rural locality.
