= Staroshakhovo =

Staroshakhovo Старошахово
- Selo
- Location within Bashkortostan Location within Russia
- Coordinates: 54°17′N 53°35′E
- Country: Russia
- Region: Bashkortostan
- District: Yermekeyevsky District
- Time zone: UTC+5:00

Staroshakhovo (Russian: Старошахово; Bashkir: Иҫке Шах, İśke Şax) is a rural locality (a selo) in Usman-Tashlinsky Selsoviet, Yermekeyevsky District, Bashkortostan, Russia. The population was 419 as of 2010. There are 4 streets.

== Geography ==
Staroshakhovo is located 29 km north of Yermekeyevo (the district's administrative centre) by road. Usman-Tashly is the nearest rural locality.
