= Yermukhametovo =

Yermukhametovo Ермухаметово
- Selo
- Location within Bashkortostan Location within Russia
- Coordinates: 54°34′N 54°10′E
- Country: Russia
- Region: Bashkortostan
- District: Tuymazinsky District
- Time zone: UTC+5:00

Yermukhametovo (Russian: Ермухаметово; Bashkir: Йәрмөхәмәт, Yärmöxämät) is a rural locality (a selo) in Kandrinsky Selsoviet, Tuymazinsky District, Bashkortostan, Russia. The population was 651 as of 2010. There are 14 streets.

== Geography ==
Yermukhametovo is located 45 km east of Tuymazy (the district's administrative centre) by road. Nizhnyaya Karan-Yelga is the nearest rural locality.
