= Kiska-Yelga, Tuymazinsky District, Republic of Bashkortostan =

Kiska-Yelga Киска-Елга
- Village
- Location within Bashkortostan Location within Russia
- Coordinates: 54°38′N 53°50′E
- Country: Russia
- Region: Bashkortostan
- District: Tuymazinsky District
- Time zone: UTC+5:00

Kiska-Yelga (Russian: Киска-Елга; Bashkir: Ҡыҫҡайылға, Qıśqayılğa) is a rural locality (a village) in Tatar-Ulkanovsky Selsoviet, Tuymazinsky District, Bashkortostan, Russia. The population was 71 as of 2010. There are 6 streets.

== Geography ==
Kiska-Yelga is located 13 km northeast of Tuymazy (the district's administrative centre) by road. Chvash-Ulkanovo is the nearest rural locality.
