= Balagach-Kul =

Balagach-Kul Балагач-Куль
- Village
- Location within Bashkortostan Location within Russia
- Coordinates: 54°41′N 53°42′E
- Country: Russia
- Region: Bashkortostan
- District: Tuymazinsky District
- Time zone: UTC+5:00

Balagach-Kul (Russian: Балагач-Куль; Bashkir: Балағаскүл, Balağaskül) is a rural locality (a village) in Kakrybashevsky Selsoviet, Tuymazinsky District, Bashkortostan, Russia. The population was 48 as of 2010. There are 2 streets.

== Geography ==
Balagach-Kul is located 15 km north of Tuymazy (the district's administrative centre) by road. Ardatovka is the nearest rural locality.
