= Khoroshovka =

Khoroshovka Хорошовка
- Village
- Location within Bashkortostan Location within Russia
- Coordinates: 53°51′N 53°52′E
- Country: Russia
- Region: Bashkortostan
- District: Yermekeyevsky District
- Time zone: UTC+5:00

Khoroshovka (Russian: Хорошовка) is a rural locality (a village) in Beketovsky Selsoviet, Yermekeyevsky District, Bashkortostan, Russia. The population was 5 as of 2010. There is 1 street.

== Geography ==
Khoroshovka is located 35 km southeast of Yermekeyevo (the district's administrative centre) by road. Novoturayevo is the nearest rural locality.
