= Baltayevo =

Baltayevo Балтаево
- Selo
- Location within Bashkortostan Location within Russia
- Coordinates: 54°26′N 54°05′E
- Country: Russia
- Region: Bashkortostan
- District: Tuymazinsky District
- Time zone: UTC+5:00

Baltayevo (Russian: Балтаево; Bashkir: Балтай, Baltay) is a rural locality (a selo) in Karamaly-Gubeyevsky Selsoviet, Tuymazinsky District, Bashkortostan, Russia. The population was 377 as of 2010. There are 5 streets.

== Geography ==
Baltayevo is located 40 kilometres (25 mi) southeast of Tuymazy (the district's administrative centre) by road. Aytaktamak is the nearest rural locality.
