= Pervomayskoye, Tuymazinsky District, Republic of Bashkortostan =

Pervomayskoye Первомайское
- Selo
- Location within Bashkortostan Location within Russia
- Coordinates: 54°32′N 53°59′E
- Country: Russia
- Region: Bashkortostan
- District: Tuymazinsky District
- Time zone: UTC+5:00

Pervomayskoye (Russian: Первомайское; Bashkir: Беренсе Май, Berense May) is a rural locality (a selo) in Kandrinsky Selsoviet, Tuymazinsky District, Bashkortostan, Russia. The population was 983 as of 2010. There are 13 streets.

== Geography ==
Pervomayskoye is located 30 km southeast of Tuymazy (the district's administrative centre) by road. Alexandrovka is the nearest rural locality.
