= Karmalka =

Karmalka (Russian: Кармалка) is the name of several rural localities in Russia:

- Karmalka, Republic of Bashkortostan, a village in Verkhnetroitsky Selsoviet of Tuymazinsky District of the Republic of Bashkortostan
- Karmalka, Orenburg Oblast, a selo in Sharlyksky Selsoviet of Sharlyksky District of Orenburg Oblast
- Karmalka, Republic of Tatarstan, a settlement under the administrative jurisdiction of the town of republic significance of Zainsk in the Republic of Tatarstan
