= Kupcheneyevo =

Kupcheneyevo Купченеево
- Selo
- Location within Bashkortostan Location within Russia
- Coordinates: 54°09′N 53°42′E
- Country: Russia
- Region: Bashkortostan
- District: Yermekeyevsky District
- Time zone: UTC+5:00

Kupcheneyevo (Russian: Купченеево; Bashkir: Күпсәнәй, Küpsänäy) is a rural locality (a selo) in Sukkulovsky Selsoviet, Yermekeyevsky District, Bashkortostan, Russia. The population was 445 as of 2010. There are 4 streets.

== Geography ==
Kupcheneyevo is located 14 km north of Yermekeyevo (the district's administrative centre) by road. Novye Sulli is the nearest rural locality.
