= Nichka-Bulyak =

Nichka-Bulyak Ничка-Буляк
- Village
- Location within Bashkortostan Location within Russia
- Coordinates: 54°24′N 54°07′E
- Country: Russia
- Region: Bashkortostan
- District: Tuymazinsky District
- Time zone: UTC+5:00

Nichka-Bulyak (Russian: Ничка-Буляк; Bashkir: Нескәбуләк, Neskäbuläk) is a rural locality (a village) in Chukadybashevsky Selsoviet, Tuymazinsky District, Bashkortostan, Russia. The population was 41 as of 2010. There is 1 street.

== Geography ==
Nichka-Bulyak is located 50 km southeast of Tuymazy (the district's administrative centre) by road. Chukadybashevo is the nearest rural locality.
