= Uyazytamak =

Uyazytamak Уязытамак
- Selo
- Location within Bashkortostan Location within Russia
- Coordinates: 54°22′N 53°25′E
- Country: Russia
- Region: Bashkortostan
- District: Tuymazinsky District
- Time zone: UTC+5:00

Uyazytamak (Russian: Уязытамак; Bashkir: Уяҙытамаҡ, Uyaźıtamaq) is a rural locality (a selo) in Karatovsky Selsoviet, Tuymazinsky District, Bashkortostan, Russia. The population was 593 as of 2010. There are 18 streets.

== Geography ==
Uyazytamak is located 37 km southwest of Tuymazy (the district's administrative centre) by road. Karatovo is the nearest rural locality.
