= Novoshakhovo =

Novoshakhovo Новошахово
- Selo
- Location within Bashkortostan Location within Russia
- Coordinates: 53°48′N 53°49′E
- Country: Russia
- Region: Bashkortostan
- District: Yermekeyevsky District
- Time zone: UTC+5:00

Novoshakhovo (Russian: Новошахово; Bashkir: Яңы Шах, Yañı Şax) is a rural locality (a selo) in Vosmomartovsky Selsoviet, Yermekeyevsky District, Bashkortostan, Russia. The population was 262 as of 2010. There are three streets.

== Geography ==
Novoshakhovo is located 49 km south of Yermekeyevo (the district's administrative centre) by road. Novoturayevo is the nearest rural locality.
