= Ryatamak =

Ryatamak Рятамак
- Selo
- Location within Bashkortostan Location within Russia
- Coordinates: 54°04′N 53°31′E
- Country: Russia
- Region: Bashkortostan
- District: Yermekeyevsky District
- Time zone: UTC+5:00

Ryatamak (Russian: Рятамак; Bashkir: Рәтамаҡ, Rätamaq) is a rural locality (a selo) and the administrative centre of Ryatamaksky Selsoviet, Yermekeyevsky District, Bashkortostan, Russia. The population was 220 as of 2010. There are 7 streets.

== Geography ==
Ryatamak is located 11 km west of Yermekeyevo (the district's administrative centre) by road. Suyermetovo is the nearest rural locality.
