= Agirtamak =

Agirtamak Агиртамак
- Selo
- Location within Bashkortostan Location within Russia
- Coordinates: 54°37′N 53°45′E
- Country: Russia
- Region: Bashkortostan
- District: Tuymazinsky District
- Time zone: UTC+5:00

Agirtamak (Russian: Агиртамак; Bashkir: Әгертамаҡ, Ägertamaq) is a rural locality (a selo) in Tyumenyakovsky Selsoviet, Tuymazinsky District, Bashkortostan, Russia. The population was 610 as of 2010. There are 10 streets.

== Geography ==
Agirtamak is located 8 km northeast of Tuymazy (the district's administrative centre) by road. Tuymazy is the nearest rural locality.
