= Lipovy Klyuch =

Lipovy Klyuch Липовый Ключ
- Village
- Location within Bashkortostan Location within Russia
- Coordinates: 54°29′N 53°47′E
- Country: Russia
- Region: Bashkortostan
- District: Tuymazinsky District
- Time zone: UTC+5:00

Lipovy Klyuch (Russian: Липовый Ключ; Bashkir: Йүкәле Шишмә, Yükäle Şişmä) is a rural locality (a village) in Verkhnebishindinsky Selsoviet, Tuymazinsky District, Bashkortostan, Russia. The population was 84 as of 2010. There are 2 streets.

== Geography ==
Lipovy Klyuch is located 18 km southeast of Tuymazy (the district's administrative centre) by road. Nizhniye Bishindy is the nearest rural locality.
