= Nikitinka, Tuymazinsky District, Republic of Bashkortostan =

Nikitinka Никитинка
- Village
- Location within Bashkortostan Location within Russia
- Coordinates: 54°31′N 53°52′E
- Country: Russia
- Region: Bashkortostan
- District: Tuymazinsky District
- Time zone: UTC+5:00

Nikitinka (Russian: Никитинка) is a rural locality (a village) in Gafurovsky Selsoviet, Tuymazinsky District, Bashkortostan, Russia. The population was 303 as of 2010. There are 3 streets.

== Geography ==
Nikitinka is located 16 km southeast of Tuymazy (the district's administrative centre) by road. Vozdvizhenka is the nearest rural locality.
