= Kain-Yelga, Tuymazinsky District, Republic of Bashkortostan =

Kain-Yelga Каин-Елга
- Village
- Location within Bashkortostan Location within Russia
- Coordinates: 54°34′N 53°50′E
- Country: Russia
- Region: Bashkortostan
- District: Tuymazinsky District
- Time zone: UTC+5:00

Kain-Yelga (Russian: Каин-Елга; Bashkir: Ҡайынйылға, Qayınyılğa) is a rural locality (a village) in Subkhankulovsky Selsoviet, Tuymazinsky District, Bashkortostan, Russia. The population was 119 as of 2010. There are 10 streets.

== Geography ==
Kain-Yelga is located 12 km southeast of Tuymazy (the district's administrative centre) by road. Zigityak is the nearest rural locality.
