= Verkhniye Bishindy =

Verkhniye Bishindy Верхние Бишинды
- Selo
- Location within Bashkortostan Location within Russia
- Coordinates: 54°28′N 53°42′E
- Country: Russia
- Region: Bashkortostan
- District: Tuymazinsky District
- Time zone: UTC+5:00

Verkhniye Bishindy (Russian: Верхние Бишинды; Bashkir: Үрге Бишенде, Ürge Bişende) is a rural locality (a selo) and the administrative centre of Verkhnebishindinsky Selsoviet, Tuymazinsky District, Bashkortostan, Russia. The population was 725 as of 2010. There are 5 streets.

== Geography ==
Verkhniye Bishindy is located 15 km south of Tuymazy (the district's administrative centre) by road. Novye Bishindy is the nearest rural locality.
