= Karan-Yelga, Tuymazinsky District, Republic of Bashkortostan =

Karan-Yelga Каран-Елга
- Village
- Location within Bashkortostan Location within Russia
- Coordinates: 54°36′N 54°13′E
- Country: Russia
- Region: Bashkortostan
- District: Tuymazinsky District
- Time zone: UTC+5:00

Karan-Yelga (Russian: Каран-Елга; Bashkir: Ҡаранйылға, Qaranyılğa) is a rural locality (a village) in Kandrinsky Selsoviet, Tuymazinsky District, Bashkortostan, Russia. The population was 9 as of 2010. There is 1 street.

== Geography ==
Karan-Yelga is located 57 km east of Tuymazy (the district's administrative centre) by road. Nizhnyaya Karan-Yelga is the nearest rural locality.
