= Ismailovo, Tuymazinsky District, Republic of Bashkortostan =

Ismailovo Исмаилово
- Village
- Location within Bashkortostan Location within Russia
- Coordinates: 54°40′N 53°39′E
- Country: Russia
- Region: Bashkortostan
- District: Tuymazinsky District
- Time zone: UTC+5:00

Ismailovo (Russian: Исмаилово; Bashkir: Исмаил, İsmail) is a rural locality (a village) in Kakrybashevsky Selsoviet, Tuymazinsky District, Bashkortostan, Russia. The population was 197 as of 2010. There are 28 streets.

== Geography ==
Ismailovo is located 12 km north of Tuymazy (the district's administrative centre) by road. Kakrybashevo is the nearest rural locality.
