= Yermunchino =

Yermunchino Ермунчино
- Selo
- Location within Bashkortostan Location within Russia
- Coordinates: 54°38′N 54°14′E
- Country: Russia
- Region: Bashkortostan
- District: Tuymazinsky District
- Time zone: UTC+5:00

Yermunchino (Russian: Ермунчино; Bashkir: Ярмунса, Yarmunsa) is a rural locality (a selo) in Bishkurayevsky Selsoviet, Tuymazinsky District, Bashkortostan, Russia. The population was 3400 as of 2010. There are 6 streets.

== Geography ==
Yermunchino is located 43 km east of Tuymazy (the district's administrative centre) by road. Bishkurayevo is the nearest rural locality.
