= Kushkaran =

Kushkaran Кушкаран
- Village
- Location within Bashkortostan Location within Russia
- Coordinates: 54°08′N 53°34′E
- Country: Russia
- Region: Bashkortostan
- District: Yermekeyevsky District
- Time zone: UTC+5:00

Kushkaran (Russian: Кушкаран; Bashkir: Ҡушҡаран, Quşqaran) is a rural locality (a village) in Kyzyl-Yarsky Selsoviet, Yermekeyevsky District, Bashkortostan, Russia. The population was 74 as of 2010. There is one street.

== Geography ==
Kushkaran is located 18 km northwest of Yermekeyevo (the district's administrative centre) by road. Kyzyl-Yar is the nearest rural locality.
