= Timirovo, Tuymazinsky District, Republic of Bashkortostan =

Timirovo Тимирово
- Village
- Location within Bashkortostan Location within Russia
- Coordinates: 54°31′N 53°44′E
- Country: Russia
- Region: Bashkortostan
- District: Tuymazinsky District
- Time zone: UTC+5:00

Timirovo (Russian: Тимирово; Bashkir: Тимер, Timer) is a rural locality (a village) in Gafurovsky Selsoviet, Tuymazinsky District, Bashkortostan, Russia. The population was 132 as of 2010. There are 5 streets.

== Geography ==
Timirovo is located 18 km southeast of Tuymazy (the district's administrative centre) by road.
