= Tuktagulovo =

Tuktagulovo Туктагулово
- Selo
- Location within Bashkortostan Location within Russia
- Coordinates: 54°38′N 54°03′E
- Country: Russia
- Region: Bashkortostan
- District: Tuymazinsky District
- Time zone: UTC+5:00

Tuktagulovo (Russian: Туктагулово; Bashkir: Туҡтағол, Tuqtağol) is a rural locality (a selo) in Bishkurayevsky Selsoviet, Tuymazinsky District, Bashkortostan, Russia. The population was 658 as of 2010. There are 5 streets.

== Geography ==
Tuktagulovo is located 30 km east of Tuymazy (the district's administrative centre) by road. Bulat is the nearest rural locality.
