= Bikmetovo =

Bikmetovo Бикметово
- Selo
- Location within Bashkortostan Location within Russia
- Coordinates: 54°34′N 53°58′E
- Country: Russia
- Region: Bashkortostan
- District: Tuymazinsky District
- Time zone: UTC+5:00

Bikmetovo (Russian: Бикметово; Bashkir: Бикмәт, Bikmät) is a rural locality (a selo) in Tatar-Ulkanovsky Selsoviet, Tuymazinsky District, Bashkortostan, Russia. The population was 109 as of 2010. There are 4 streets.

== Geography ==
Bikmetovo is located 24 km east of Tuymazy (the district's administrative centre) by road. Maloye Bikmetovo is the nearest rural locality.
