= Sayranovo, Tuymazinsky District, Republic of Bashkortostan =

Sayranovo Сайраново
- Selo
- Location within Bashkortostan Location within Russia
- Coordinates: 54°28′N 54°11′E
- Country: Russia
- Region: Bashkortostan
- District: Tuymazinsky District
- Time zone: UTC+5:00

Sayranovo (Russian: Сайраново; Bashkir: Сәйрән, Säyrän) is a rural locality (a selo) and the administrative centre of Sayranovsky Selsoviet, Tuymazinsky District, Bashkortostan, Russia. The population was 688 as of 2010. There are 3 streets.

== Geography ==
Sayranovo is located 46 km southeast of Tuymazy (the district's administrative centre) by road. Urnyak is the nearest rural locality.
