= Kakrybashevo =

Kakrybashevo Какрыбашево
- Selo
- Location within Bashkortostan Location within Russia
- Coordinates: 54°41′N 53°39′E
- Country: Russia
- Region: Bashkortostan
- District: Tuymazinsky District
- Time zone: UTC+5:00

Kakrybashevo (Russian: Какрыбашево; Bashkir: Кәкребаш, Käkrebaş) is a rural locality (a selo) and the administrative centre of Kakrybashevsky Selsoviet, Tuymazinsky District, Bashkortostan, Russia. The population was 651 as of 2010. There are 10 streets.

== Geography ==
Kakrybashevo is located 13 km north of Tuymazy (the district's administrative centre) by road. Ismailovo is the nearest rural locality.
