= Chuvash-Ulkanovo =

Chuvash-Ulkanovo Чуваш-Улканово
- Village
- Location within Bashkortostan Location within Russia
- Coordinates: 54°38′N 53°51′E
- Country: Russia
- Region: Bashkortostan
- District: Tuymazinsky District
- Time zone: UTC+5:00

Chuvash-Ulkanovo (Russian: Чуваш-Улканово; Bashkir: Сыуаш-Олҡан, Sıwaş-Olqan) is a rural locality (a village) in Tatar-Ulkanovsky Selsoviet, Tuymazinsky District, Bashkortostan, Russia. The population was 158 as of 2010. There are 4 streets.

== Geography ==
Chuvash-Ulkanovo is located 14 km northeast of Tuymazy (the district's administrative centre) by road. Kiska-Yelga is the nearest rural locality.
