= Karatovo =

Karatovo Каратово
- Selo
- Location within Bashkortostan Location within Russia
- Coordinates: 54°20′N 53°25′E
- Country: Russia
- Region: Bashkortostan
- District: Tuymazinsky District
- Time zone: UTC+5:00

Karatovo (Russian: Каратово; Bashkir: Ҡарат, Qarat) is a rural locality (a selo) and the administrative centre of Karatovsky Selsoviet, Tuymazinsky District, Bashkortostan, Russia. The population was 267 as of 2010. There are 3 streets.

== Geography ==
Karatovo is located 40 km southwest of Tuymazy (the district's administrative centre) by road. Isergapovo is the nearest rural locality.
