= Novy Arslan =

Novy Arslan Новый Арслан
- Village
- Location within Bashkortostan Location within Russia
- Coordinates: 54°37′N 54°19′E
- Country: Russia
- Region: Bashkortostan
- District: Tuymazinsky District
- Time zone: UTC+5:00

Novy Arslan (Russian: Новый Арслан; Bashkir: Яңы Арыҫлан, Yañı Arıślan) is a rural locality (a village) in Bishkurayevsky Selsoviet, Tuymazinsky District, Bashkortostan, Russia. The population was 19 as of 2010. There is 1 street.

== Geography ==
Novy Arslan is located 55 km east of Tuymazy (the district's administrative centre) by road. Yulduzly is the nearest rural locality.
