= Bereskletovskogo Khozyaystva =

Bereskletovskogo Khozyaystva Бересклетовского Хозяйства
- Village
- Location within Bashkortostan Location within Russia
- Coordinates: 54°25′N 53°39′E
- Country: Russia
- Region: Bashkortostan
- District: Tuymazinsky District
- Time zone: UTC+5:00

Bereskletovskogo Khozyaystva (Russian: Бересклетовского Хозяйства; Bashkir: Бөресклет хужалығы, Böresklet xujalığı) is a rural locality (a village) in Verkhnebishindinsky Selsoviet, Tuymazinsky District, Bashkortostan, Russia. The population was 15 as of 2010. There is 1 street.

== Geography ==
Bereskletovskogo Khozyaystva is located 26 km south of Tuymazy (the district's administrative centre) by road. Imangulovo is the nearest rural locality.
