= Tukayevo, Tuymazinsky District, Republic of Bashkortostan =

Tukayevo Тукаево
- Selo
- Location within Bashkortostan Location within Russia
- Coordinates: 54°23′N 53°59′E
- Country: Russia
- Region: Bashkortostan
- District: Tuymazinsky District
- Time zone: UTC+5:00

Tukayevo (Russian: Тукаево; Bashkir: Туҡай, Tuqay) is a rural locality (a selo) in Karamaly-Gubeyevsky Selsoviet, Tuymazinsky District, Bashkortostan, Russia. The population was 587 as of 2010. There are 9 streets.

== Geography ==
Tukayevo is located 34 km southeast of Tuymazy (the district's administrative centre) by road. Karamaly-Gubeyevo is the nearest rural locality.
