= Novoturayevo =

Novoturayevo Новониколаевка
- Selo
- Location within Bashkortostan Location within Russia
- Coordinates: 53°49′N 53°50′E
- Country: Russia
- Region: Bashkortostan
- District: Yermekeyevsky District
- Time zone: UTC+5:00

Novoturayevo (Russian: Новотураево; Bashkir: Яңы Турай, Yañı Turay) is a rural locality (a selo) in Beketovsky Selsoviet, Yermekeyevsky District, Bashkortostan, Russia. The population was 269 as of 2010. There are 4 streets.

== Geography ==
Novoturayevo is located 49 km southeast of Yermekeyevo (the district's administrative centre) by road. Novoshakhovo is the nearest rural locality.
