= Novoarslanbekovo =

Novoarslanbekovo Новоарсланбеково
- Village
- Location within Bashkortostan Location within Russia
- Coordinates: 54°30′N 54°13′E
- Country: Russia
- Region: Bashkortostan
- District: Tuymazinsky District
- Time zone: UTC+5:00

Novoarslanbekovo (Russian: Новоарсланбеково; Bashkir: Яңы Арыҫланбәк, Yañı Arıślanbäk) is a rural locality (a village) in Sayranovsky Selsoviet, Tuymazinsky District, Bashkortostan, Russia. The population was 150 as of 2010. There are two streets.

== Geography ==
Novoarslanbekovo is located 49 km southeast of Tuymazy (the district's administrative centre) by road. Staroarslanbekovo is the nearest rural locality.
