= Kulbayevo =

Kulbayevo Кулбаево
- Selo
- Location within Bashkortostan Location within Russia
- Coordinates: 54°09′N 53°27′E
- Country: Russia
- Region: Bashkortostan
- District: Yermekeyevsky District
- Time zone: UTC+5:00

Kulbayevo (Russian: Кулбаево; Bashkir: Ҡолбай, Qolbay) is a rural locality (a selo) in Kyzyl-Yarsky Selsoviet, Yermekeyevsky District, Bashkortostan, Russia. The population was 339 as of 2010. There are 5 streets.

== Geography ==
Kulbayevo is located 22 km northwest of Yermekeyevo (the district's administrative centre) by road. Novozarechensk is the nearest rural locality.
