= Novyye Bishindy =

Novyye Bishindy Новые Бишинды
- Selo
- Location within Bashkortostan Location within Russia
- Coordinates: 54°27′N 53°39′E
- Country: Russia
- Region: Bashkortostan
- District: Tuymazinsky District
- Time zone: UTC+5:00

Novyye Bishindy (Russian: Новые Бишинды; Bashkir: Яңы Бишенде, Yañı Bişende) is a rural locality (a selo) in Verkhnebishindinsky Selsoviet, Tuymazinsky District, Bashkortostan, Russia. The population was 274 as of 2010. There are 3 streets.

== Geography ==
Novyye Bishindy is located 19 km south of Tuymazy (the district's administrative centre) by road. Verkhniye Bishindy is the nearest rural locality.
