= Mulla-Kamysh =

Mulla-Kamysh Мулла-Камыш
- Village
- Location within Bashkortostan Location within Russia
- Coordinates: 54°26′N 53°43′E
- Country: Russia
- Region: Bashkortostan
- District: Tuymazinsky District
- Time zone: UTC+5:00

Mulla-Kamysh (Russian: Мулла-Камыш; Bashkir: Мулла-Ҡамыш, Mulla-Qamış) is a rural locality (a village) in Verkhnebishindinsky Selsoviet, Tuymazinsky District, Bashkortostan, Russia. The population was 40 as of 2010. There is 1 street.

== Geography ==
Mulla-Kamysh is located 25 km south of Tuymazy (the district's administrative centre) by road. Samsykovo is the nearest rural locality.
