= Karan-Bishindy =

Karan-Bishindy Каран-Бишинды
- Village
- Location within Bashkortostan Location within Russia
- Coordinates: 54°29′N 53°41′E
- Country: Russia
- Region: Bashkortostan
- District: Tuymazinsky District
- Time zone: UTC+5:00

Karan-Bishindy (Russian: Каран-Бишинды; Bashkir: Ҡаран-Бишенде, Qaran-Bişende) is a rural locality (a village) in Verkhnebishindinsky Selsoviet, Tuymazinsky District, Bashkortostan, Russia. The population was 168 as of 2010. There are 2 streets.

== Geography ==
Karan-Bishindy is located 16 km south of Tuymazy (the district's administrative centre) by road. Verkhniye Bishindy is the nearest rural locality.
