= Novonaryshevo =

Novonaryshevo Новонарышево
- Village
- Location within Bashkortostan Location within Russia
- Coordinates: 54°34′N 53°31′E
- Country: Russia
- Region: Bashkortostan
- District: Tuymazinsky District
- Time zone: UTC+5:00

Novonaryshevo (Russian: Новонарышево; Bashkir: Яңы Нарыш, Yañı Narış) is a rural locality (a village) in Verkhnetroitsky Selsoviet, Tuymazinsky District, Bashkortostan, Russia. The population was 168 as of 2010. There is 1 street.

== Geography ==
Novonaryshevo is located 35 km south of Tuymazy (the district's administrative centre) by road. Verkhnetroitskoye is the nearest rural locality.
