= Staroarslanbekovo =

Staroarslanbekovo Староарсланбеково
- Village
- Location within Bashkortostan Location within Russia
- Coordinates: 54°30′N 54°13′E
- Country: Russia
- Region: Bashkortostan
- District: Tuymazinsky District
- Time zone: UTC+5:00

Staroarslanbekovo (Russian: Староарсланбеково; Bashkir: Иҫке Арыҫланбәк, İśke Arıślanbäk) is a rural locality (a village) in Sayranovsky Selsoviet, Tuymazinsky District, Bashkortostan, Russia. The population was 119 as of 2010. There is 1 street.

== Geography ==
Staroarslanbekovo is located 52 km southeast of Tuymazy (the district's administrative centre) by road. Novoarslanbekovo is the nearest rural locality.
