= Imyan-Kuper =

Imyan-Kuper Имян-Купер
- Selo
- Location within Bashkortostan Location within Russia
- Coordinates: 54°23′N 54°16′E
- Country: Russia
- Region: Bashkortostan
- District: Tuymazinsky District
- Time zone: UTC+5:00

Imyan-Kuper (Russian: Имян-Купер; Bashkir: Имәнкүпер, İmänküper) is a rural locality (a selo) in Chukadybashevsky Selsoviet, Tuymazinsky District, Bashkortostan, Russia. The population was 123 as of 2010. There are 4 streets.

== Geography ==
Imyan-Kuper is located 58 km southeast of Tuymazy (the district's administrative centre) by road. Alexeyevka is the nearest rural locality.
