= Kamyshtau =

Kamyshtau Камыштау
- Village
- Location within Bashkortostan Location within Russia
- Coordinates: 54°25′N 54°08′E
- Country: Russia
- Region: Bashkortostan
- District: Tuymazinsky District
- Time zone: UTC+5:00

Kamyshtau (Russian: Камыштау; Bashkir: Ҡамыштау, Qamıştaw) is a rural locality (a village) in Chukadybashevsky Selsoviet, Tuymazinsky District, Bashkortostan, Russia. The population was 29 as of 2010. There are 2 streets.

== Geography ==
Kamyshtau is located 18 km southeast of Tuymazy (the district's administrative centre) by road.
