= Bayrakatuba =

Bayrakatuba Байракатуба
- Village
- Location within Bashkortostan Location within Russia
- Coordinates: 54°39′N 53°34′E
- Country: Russia
- Region: Bashkortostan
- District: Tuymazinsky District
- Time zone: UTC+5:00

Bayrakatuba (Russian: Байракатуба; Bashkir: Бәйрәкәтүбә, Bäyräkätübä) is a rural locality (a village) in Ilchimbetovsky Selsoviet, Tuymazinsky District, Bashkortostan, Russia. The population was 101 as of 2010. There is 1 street.

== Geography ==
Bayrakatuba is located 16 km northwest of Tuymazy (the district's administrative centre) by road. Ilchimbetovo is the nearest rural locality.
