= Kyzyl-Yar, Yermekeyevsky District, Republic of Bashkortostan =

Kyzyl-Yar Кызыл-Яр
- Selo
- Location within Bashkortostan Location within Russia
- Coordinates: 54°08′N 53°32′E
- Country: Russia
- Region: Bashkortostan
- District: Yermekeyevsky District
- Time zone: UTC+5:00

Kyzyl-Yar (Russian: Кызыл-Яр; Bashkir: Ҡыҙылъяр, Qıźılyar) is a rural locality (a selo) in Kyzyl-Yarsky Selsoviet, Yermekeyevsky District, Bashkortostan, Russia. The population was 72 as of 2010. There is 1 street.

== Geography ==
Kyzyl-Yar is located 18 km northwest of Yermekeyevo (the district's administrative centre) by road. Kushkaran is the nearest rural locality.
