= Zigityak =

Zigityak Зигитяк
- Selo
- Location within Bashkortostan Location within Russia
- Coordinates: 54°34′N 53°48′E
- Country: Russia
- Region: Bashkortostan
- District: Tuymazinsky District
- Time zone: UTC+5:00

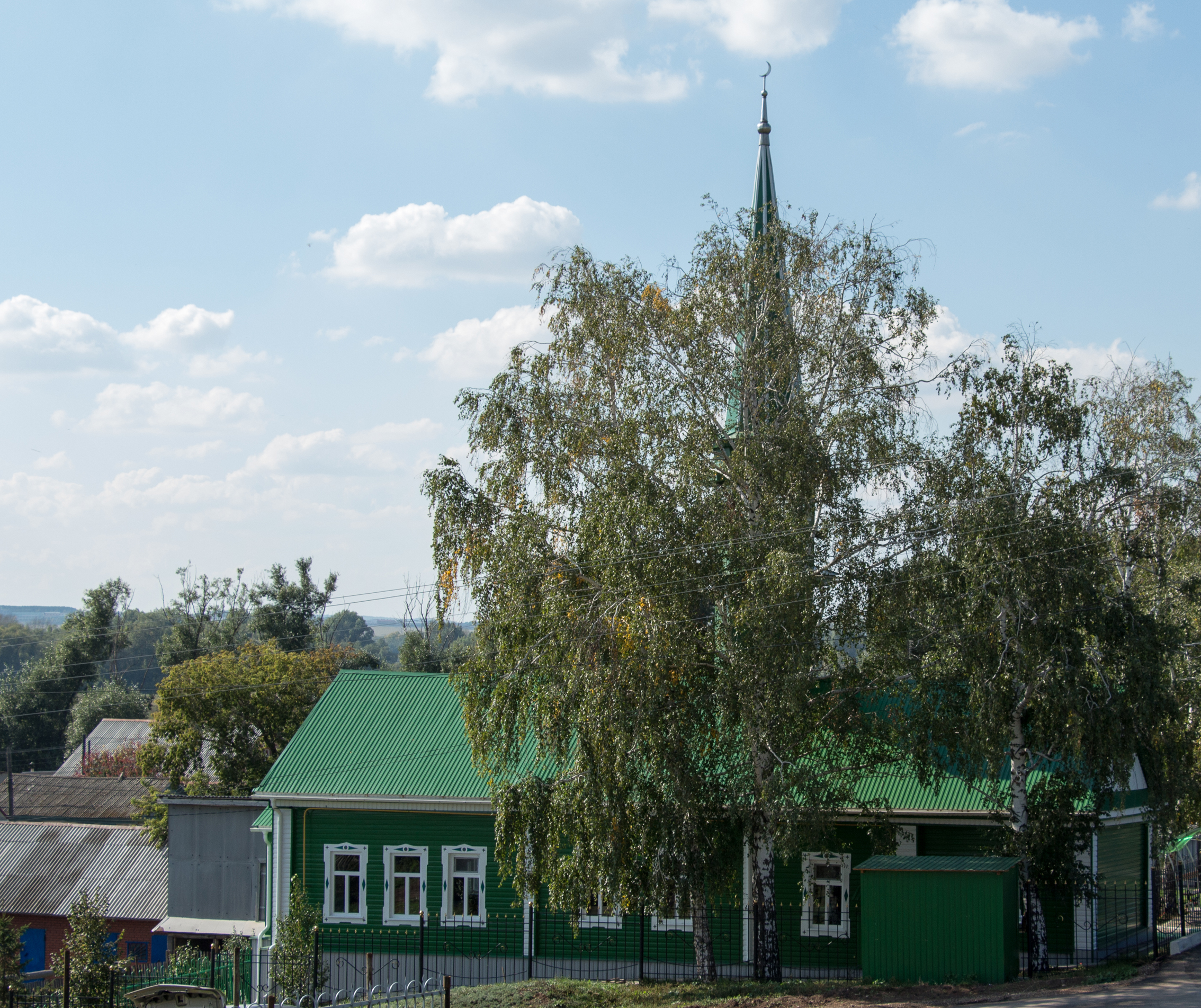
Zigityak mosque

Zigityak (Russian: Зигитяк; Bashkir: Егетәк, Yegetäk) is a rural locality (a selo) in Subkhankulovsky Selsoviet, Tuymazinsky District, Bashkortostan, Russia. The population was 279 as of 2010. There are 5 streets.

== Geography ==
Zigityak is located 11 km southeast of Tuymazy (the district's administrative centre) by road. Nurkeyevo is the nearest rural locality.
