= Aytaktamak =

Aytaktamak Айтактамак
- Village
- Location within Bashkortostan Location within Russia
- Coordinates: 54°27′N 54°00′E
- Country: Russia
- Region: Bashkortostan
- District: Tuymazinsky District
- Time zone: UTC+5:00

Aytaktamak (Russian: Айтактамак; Bashkir: Әйтәктамаҡ, Äytäktamaq) is a rural locality (a village) in Nikolayevsky Selsoviet, Tuymazinsky District, Bashkortostan, Russia. The population was 76 as of 2010. There are 2 streets.

== Geography ==
Aytaktamak is located 30 km southeast of Tuymazy (the district's administrative centre) by road. Nikolayevka is the nearest rural locality.
