= Kendektamak =

Kendektamak Кендектамак
- Selo
- Location within Bashkortostan Location within Russia
- Coordinates: 54°28′N 53°55′E
- Country: Russia
- Region: Bashkortostan
- District: Tuymazinsky District
- Time zone: UTC+5:00

Kendektamak (Russian: Кендектамак; Bashkir: Кендектамаҡ, Kendektamaq) is a rural locality (a selo) in Nikolayevsky Selsoviet, Tuymazinsky District, Bashkortostan, Russia. The population was 475 as of 2010. There are 7 streets.

== Geography ==
Kendektamak is located 22 km southeast of Tuymazy (the district's administrative centre) by road. Novosukkulovo is the nearest rural locality.
