= Sysoyevka =

Sysoyevka Сысоевка
- Village
- Location within Bashkortostan Location within Russia
- Coordinates: 53°56′N 53°54′E
- Country: Russia
- Region: Bashkortostan
- District: Yermekeyevsky District
- Time zone: UTC+5:00

Sysoyevka (Russian: Сысоевка) is a rural locality (a village) in Beketovsky Selsoviet, Yermekeyevsky District, Bashkortostan, Russia. The population was 1 as of 2010. There is 1 street.

== Geography ==
Sysoyevka is located 28 km southeast of Yermekeyevo (the district's administrative centre) by road. Beketovo is the nearest rural locality.
