= Verkhneulu-Yelga =

Verkhneulu-Yelga Верхнеулу-Елга
- Selo
- Location within Bashkortostan Location within Russia
- Coordinates: 54°01′N 53°44′E
- Country: Russia
- Region: Bashkortostan
- District: Yermekeyevsky District
- Time zone: UTC+5:00

Verkhneulu-Yelga (Russian: Верхнеулу-Елга; Bashkir: Үрге Олойылға, Ürge Oloyılğa) is a rural locality (a selo) in Nizhneulu-Yelginsky Selsoviet, Yermekeyevsky District, Bashkortostan, Russia. The population was 182 as of 2010. There is 1 street.

== Geography ==
Verkhneulu-Yelga is located 9 km southeast of Yermekeyevo (the district's administrative centre) by road. Novonikolayevka is the nearest rural locality.
