= Tyumenyak =

Tyumenyak Тюменяк
- Selo
- Location within Bashkortostan Location within Russia
- Coordinates: 54°40′N 53°47′E
- Country: Russia
- Region: Bashkortostan
- District: Tuymazinsky District
- Time zone: UTC+5:00

Tyumenyak (Russian: Тюменяк; Bashkir: Төмәнәк, Tömänäk) is a rural locality (a selo) and the administrative centre of Tyumenyakovsky Selsoviet, Tuymazinsky District, Bashkortostan, Russia. The population was 1,070 as of 2010. There are 10 streets.

== Geography ==
Tyumenyak is located 14 km northeast of Tuymazy (the district's administrative centre) by road. Darvino is the nearest rural locality.
