= Tukmak-Karan =

Tukmak-Karan Тукмак-Каран
- Village
- Location within Bashkortostan Location within Russia
- Coordinates: 54°37′N 54°18′E
- Country: Russia
- Region: Bashkortostan
- District: Tuymazinsky District
- Time zone: UTC+5:00

Tukmak-Karan (Russian: Тукмак-Каран; Bashkir: Туҡмак-Ҡаран, Tuqmak-Qaran) is a rural locality (a village) in Kakrybashevsky Selsoviet, Tuymazinsky District, Bashkortostan, Russia. The population was 119 as of 2010. There is only a single road.

== Geography ==
Tukmak-Karan is located 54 km east of Tuymazy (the district's administrative centre) by road.
