= Staroye Subkhankulovo =

Staroye Subkhankulovo Старое Субханкулово
- Selo
- Location within Bashkortostan Location within Russia
- Coordinates: 54°33′N 53°48′E
- Country: Russia
- Region: Bashkortostan
- District: Tuymazinsky District
- Time zone: UTC+5:00

Staroye Subkhankulovo (Russian: Старое Субханкулово; Bashkir: Иҫке Собханғол, İśke Sobxanğol) is a rural locality (a selo) in Subkhankulovsky Selsoviet, Tuymazinsky District, Bashkortostan, Russia. The population was 784 as of 2010. There are 19 streets.

== Geography ==
Staroye Subkhankulovo is located 10 km southeast of Tuymazy (the district's administrative centre) by road. Subkhankulovo is the nearest rural locality.
