= Nizhniye Karamaly, Yermekeyevsky District, Republic of Bashkortostan =

Nizhniye Karamaly Нижние Карамалы
- Selo
- Location within Bashkortostan Location within Russia
- Coordinates: 53°56′N 53°34′E
- Country: Russia
- Region: Bashkortostan
- District: Yermekeyevsky District
- Time zone: UTC+5:00

Nizhniye Karamaly (Russian: Нижние Карамалы; Bashkir: Түбәнге Ҡарамалы, Tübänge Qaramalı) is a rural locality (a selo) in Srednekarmalinsky Selsoviet, Yermekeyevsky District, Bashkortostan, Russia. The population was 336 as of 2010. There are 3 streets.

== Geography ==
Nizhniye Karamaly is located 18 km southwest of Yermekeyevo (the district's administrative centre) by road. Petrovka is the nearest rural locality.
