= Maloye Bikmetovo =

Maloye Bikmetovo Малое Бикметово
- Village
- Location within Bashkortostan Location within Russia
- Coordinates: 54°34′N 53°58′E
- Country: Russia
- Region: Bashkortostan
- District: Tuymazinsky District
- Time zone: UTC+5:00

Maloye Bikmetovo (Russian: Малое Бикметово; Bashkir: Кесе Бикмәт, Kese Bikmät) is a rural locality (a village) in Tatar-Ulkanovsky Selsoviet, Tuymazinsky District, Bashkortostan, Russia. The population was 14 as of 2010. There is 1 street.

== Geography ==
Maloye Bikmetovo is located 23 km east of Tuymazy (the district's administrative centre) by road. Bikmetovo is the nearest rural locality.
