= Byatki =

Byatki Бятки
- Village
- Location within Bashkortostan Location within Russia
- Coordinates: 54°47′N 53°37′E
- Country: Russia
- Region: Bashkortostan
- District: Tuymazinsky District
- Time zone: UTC+5:00

Byatki (Russian: Бятки; Bashkir: Бәтке, Bätke) is a rural locality (a village) in Kakrybashevsky Selsoviet, Tuymazinsky District, Bashkortostan, Russia. The population was 146 as of 2010. There are 2 streets.

== Geography ==
Byatki is located 24 km north of Tuymazy (the district's administrative centre) by road. Ablayevo is the nearest rural locality.
