= Samsykovo =

Samsykovo Самсыково
- Village
- Location within Bashkortostan Location within Russia
- Coordinates: 54°27′N 53°45′E
- Country: Russia
- Region: Bashkortostan
- District: Tuymazinsky District
- Time zone: UTC+5:00

Samsykovo (Russian: Самсыково; Bashkir: Самсыҡ, Samsıq) is a rural locality (a village) in Verkhnebishindinsky Selsoviet, Tuymazinsky District, Bashkortostan, Russia. The population was 76 as of 2010. There are 2 streets.

== Geography ==
Samsykovo is located 19 km south of Tuymazy (the district's administrative centre) by road. Olkhovka is the nearest rural locality.
