= Staryye Sulli =

Staryye Sulli Старые Сулли
- Selo
- Location within Bashkortostan Location within Russia
- Coordinates: 54°11′N 53°34′E
- Country: Russia
- Region: Bashkortostan
- District: Yermekeyevsky District
- Time zone: UTC+5:00

Staryye Sulli (Russian: Старые Сулли; Bashkir: Иҫке Сүлле, İśke Sülle) is a rural locality (a selo) and the administrative centre of Starosullinsky Selsoviet, Yermekeyevsky District, Bashkortostan, Russia. The population was 342 as of 2010. There are 3 streets.

== Geography ==
Staryye Sulli is located 17 km north of Yermekeyevo (the district's administrative centre) by road. Novye Sulli is the nearest rural locality.
