= Staryye Kandry =

Staryye Kandry Старые Кандры
- Selo
- Location within Bashkortostan Location within Russia
- Coordinates: 54°32′N 54°03′E
- Country: Russia
- Region: Bashkortostan
- District: Tuymazinsky District
- Time zone: UTC+5:00

Staryye Kandry (Russian: Старые Кандры; Bashkir: Иҫке Ҡандра, İśke Qandra) is a rural locality (a selo) in Kandrinsky Selsoviet, Tuymazinsky District, Bashkortostan, Russia. The population was 308 as of 2010.

== Geography ==
Staryye Kandry is located 35 km southeast of Tuymazy (the district's administrative centre) by road. Kandry is the nearest rural locality.
