= Ardatovka =

Ardatovka Ардатовка
- Village
- Location within Bashkortostan Location within Russia
- Coordinates: 54°42′N 53°40′E
- Country: Russia
- Region: Bashkortostan
- District: Tuymazinsky District
- Time zone: UTC+5:00

Ardatovka (Russian: Ардатовка; Bashkir: Арҙат, Arźat) is a rural locality (a village) in Kakrybashevsky Selsoviet, Tuymazinsky District, Bashkortostan, Russia. The population was 47 as of 2010. There are 2 streets.

== Geography ==
Ardatovka is located 16 km north of Tuymazy (the district's administrative centre) by road. Balagach-Kul is the nearest rural locality.
