= Kozhay-Andreyevo =

Kozhay-Andreyevo Кожай-Андреево
- Selo
- Location within Bashkortostan Location within Russia
- Coordinates: 54°19′N 53°30′E
- Country: Russia
- Region: Bashkortostan
- District: Tuymazinsky District
- Time zone: UTC+5:00

Kozhay-Andreyevo (Russian: Кожай-Андреево) is a rural locality (a selo) in Karatovsky Selsoviet, Tuymazinsky District, Bashkortostan, Russia. The population was 25 as of 2010. There are 2 streets.

== Geography ==
Kozhay-Andreyevo is located 50 km southwest of Tuymazy (the district's administrative centre) by road. Yakshayevo is the nearest rural locality.
