= Mayskoye, Tuymazinsky District, Republic of Bashkortostan =

Mayskoye Майское
- Village
- Location within Bashkortostan Location within Russia
- Coordinates: 54°22′N 53°47′E
- Country: Russia
- Region: Bashkortostan
- District: Tuymazinsky District
- Time zone: UTC+5:00

Mayskoye (Russian: Майское) is a rural locality (a village) in Verkhnetroitsky Selsoviet, Tuymazinsky District, Bashkortostan, Russia. The population was 48 as of 2010. There are 4 streets.

== Geography ==
Mayskoye is located 29 km south of Tuymazy (the district's administrative centre) by road. Verkhnetroitskoye is the nearest rural locality.
