= Abdulkarimovo, Yermekeyevsky District, Bashkortostan =

Abdulkarimovo Абдулкаримово Әбделкәрим Äbdelkärim
- Selo
- Location within Bashkortostan Location within Russia
- Coordinates: 54°04′N 53°36′E
- Country: Russia
- Region: Bashkortostan
- District: Yermekeyevsky District
- Time zone: [[UTC+5:00]]

Abdulkarimovo (Russian: Абдулкаримово; Bashkir: Әбделкәрим, Äbdelkärim) is a rural locality (a selo) in Yermekeyevsky Selsoviet of Yermekeyevsky District, Bashkortostan, Russia. The population was 478 as of 2010. There are 9 streets.

== Geography ==
Abdulkarimovo is located 5 km west of Yermekeyevo (the district's administrative centre) by road. Yermekeyevo is the nearest rural locality.

== Ethnicity ==
The village is inhabited by Bashkirs, Tatars and others.
