= Beketovo, Yermekeyevsky District, Republic of Bashkortostan =

Beketovo Бекетово
- Selo
- Location within Bashkortostan Location within Russia
- Coordinates: 53°54′N 53°52′E
- Country: Russia
- Region: Bashkortostan
- District: Yermekeyevsky District
- Time zone: UTC+5:00

Beketovo (Russian: Бекетово) is a rural locality (a selo) and the administrative centre of Beketovsky Selsoviet, Yermekeyevsky District, Bashkortostan, Russia. The population was 477 as of 2010. There are 7 streets.

== Geography ==
Beketovo is located 25 km southeast of Yermekeyevo (the district's administrative centre) by road. Priyutovo is the nearest rural locality.
