= Karmalka, Republic of Bashkortostan =

Karmalka Кармалка
- Village
- Location within Bashkortostan Location within Russia
- Coordinates: 54°17′N 53°48′E
- Country: Russia
- Region: Bashkortostan
- District: Tuymazinsky District
- Time zone: UTC+5:00

Karmalka (Russian: Кармалка; Bashkir: Ҡарамалы, Qaramalı) is a rural locality (a village) in Verkhnetroitsky Selsoviet, Tuymazinsky District, Bashkortostan, Russia. The population was 7 as of 2010. There is 1 street.

== Geography ==
Karmalka is located 38 km south of Tuymazy (the district's administrative centre) by road. Verkhnetroitskoye is the nearest rural locality.
