= Raymanovo, Yermekeyevsky District =

Raymanovo Райманово
- Village
- Location within Bashkortostan Location within Russia
- Coordinates: 54°12′N 53°50′E
- Country: Russia
- Region: Bashkortostan
- District: Yermekeyevsky District
- Time zone: UTC+5:00

Raymanovo (Russian: Райманово; Bashkir: Райман, Rayman) is a rural locality (a village) in Sukkulovsky Selsoviet, Yermekeyevsky District, Bashkortostan, Russia. The population was 24 as of 2010. There is 1 street.

== Geography ==
Raymanovo is located 6 km south of Yermekeyevo (the district's administrative centre) by road.
