= Raymanovo, Tuymazinsky District =

Raymanovo Райманово
- Selo
- Location within Bashkortostan Location within Russia
- Coordinates: 54°38′N 53°42′E
- Country: Russia
- Region: Bashkortostan
- District: Tuymazinsky District
- Time zone: UTC+5:00

Raymanovo (Russian: Райманово; Bashkir: Райман, Rayman) is a rural locality (a selo) in Tyumenyakovsky Selsoviet, Tuymazinsky District, Bashkortostan, Russia. The population was 970 as of 2010. There are 41 streets.

== Geography ==
Raymanovo is located 6 km north of Tuymazy (the district's administrative centre) by road. Severny is the nearest rural locality.
