= Beketovo, Vozhegodsky District, Vologda Oblast =

Beketovo Бекетово
- Settlement
- Location within Vologda Oblast Location within Russia
- Coordinates: 60°26′N 39°39′E
- Country: Russia
- Region: Vologda Oblast
- District: Vozhegodsky District
- Time zone: UTC+3:00

Beketovo (Russian: Бекетово) is a rural locality (a settlement) in Kadnikovskoye Rural Settlement, Vozhegodsky District, Vologda Oblast, Russia. The population was 171 as of 2002. There are five streets.

== Geography ==
Beketovo is located 36 km west of Vozhega (the district's administrative centre) by road. Neklyudikha is the nearest rural locality.
