= Abdulkarimovo, Alsheyevsky District, Bashkortostan =

Abdulkarimovo Абдулкаримово Әбделкәрим Äbdelkärim
- Village
- Location within Bashkortostan Location within Russia
- Coordinates: 53°56′N 55°15′E
- Country: Russia
- Region: Bashkortostan
- District: Alsheyevsky District
- Time zone: [[UTC+5:00]]

Abdulkarimovo (Russian: Абдулкаримово; Bashkir: Әбделкәрим, Äbdelkärim) is a rural locality (a village) in Abdrashitovsky Selsoviet of Alsheyevsky District, Bashkortostan, Russia. The population was 68 as of 2010. There are 2 streets.

== Geography ==
Abdulkarimovo is located 41 km southeast of Rayevsky (the district's administrative centre) by road. Balkan is the nearest rural locality.

== Ethnicity ==
The village is inhabited by Bashkirs and others.
