= Beketovo, Cherepovetsky District, Vologda Oblast =

Beketovo Бекетово
- Village
- Location within Vologda Oblast Location within Russia
- Coordinates: 59°17′N 38°11′E
- Country: Russia
- Region: Vologda Oblast
- District: Cherepovetsky District
- Time zone: UTC+3:00

Beketovo (Russian: Бекетово) is a rural locality (a village) in Yaganovskoye Rural Settlement, Cherepovetsky District, Vologda Oblast, Russia. The population was 23 as of 2002.

== Geography ==
Beketovo is located 34 km (21 mi) northeast of Cherepovets (the district's administrative centre) by road. Sobolevo is the nearest rural locality.
