= Abdulkarimovo, Baymaksky District, Bashkortostan =

Abdulkarimovo Абдулкаримово Әбделкәрим Äbdelkärim
- Selo
- Location within Bashkortostan Location within Russia
- Coordinates: 52°25′N 57°52′E
- Country: Russia
- Region: Bashkortostan
- District: Baymaksky District
- Time zone: [[UTC+5:00]]

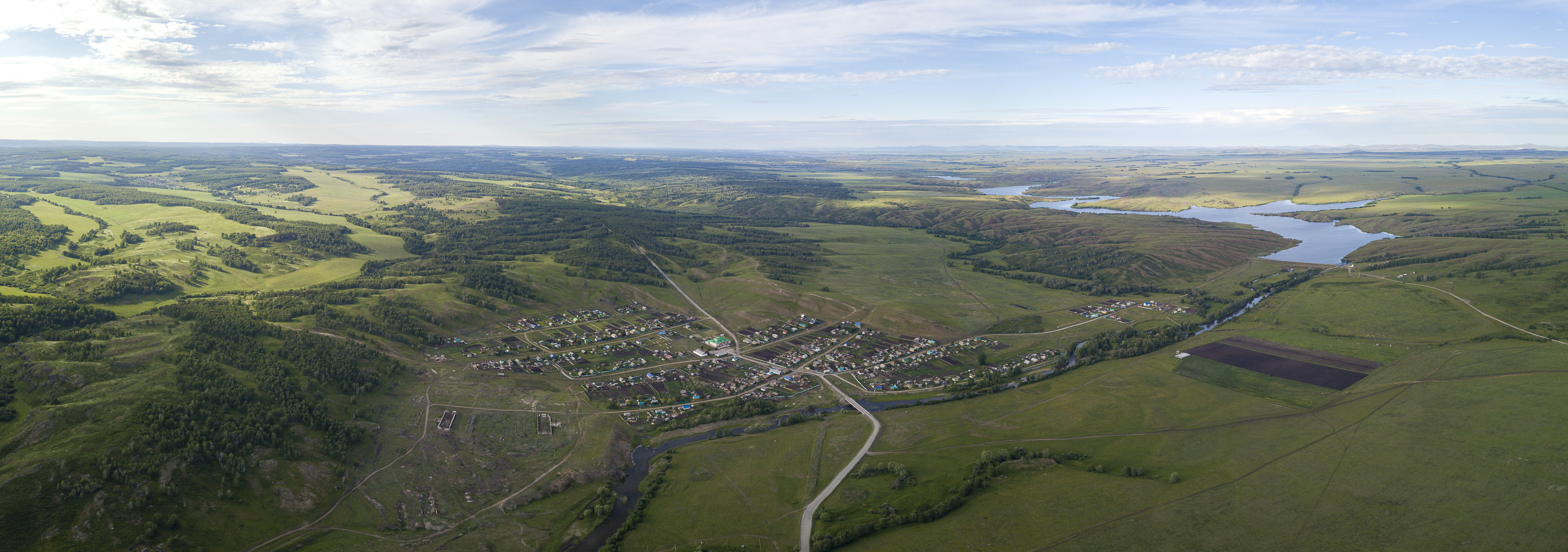

Abdulkarimovo (Russian: Абдулкаримово; Bashkir: Әбделкәрим, Äbdelkärim) is a rural locality (a selo) and the administrative centre of Abdulkarimovsky Selsoviet, Baymaksky District, Bashkortostan, Russia. The population was 425 as of 2010. There are 8 streets.

== Geography ==
Abdulkarimovo is located 45 km southwest of Baymak (the district's administrative centre) by road. Kuvatovo is the nearest rural locality.

== Ethnicity ==
The village is inhabited by Bashkirs.
