= Beketovo, Karmaskalinsky District, Republic of Bashkortostan =

Beketovo Бекетово
- Selo
- Location within Bashkortostan Location within Russia
- Coordinates: 54°24′N 55°48′E
- Country: Russia
- Region: Bashkortostan
- District: Karmaskalinsky District
- Time zone: UTC+5:00

Beketovo (Russian: Бекетово) is a rural locality (a selo) in Podlubovsky Selsoviet, Karmaskalinsky District, Bashkortostan, Russia. The population was 633 as of 2010. There are seven streets.

== Geography ==
Beketovo is located 34 km northwest of Karmaskaly (the district's administrative centre) by road. Saburovo is the nearest rural locality.
