= Yermekeyevo =

Yermekeyevo Ермекеево
- Selo
- Interactive map of Yermekeyevo
- Location of Yermekeyevo Yermekeyevo (Bashkortostan)
- Coordinates: 54°04′40″N 53°40′10″E
- Country: Russia
- Federal subject: Bashkortostan

Population (2010 Census)
  - Total: 3,937
  - Estimate (2010): 3,937 (0%)

Administrative status
  - Subordinated to: Yermekeyevsky District
- Time zone: UTC+5 (MSK+2)
- Postal code: 452190
- OKTMO ID: 80625407101

Yermekeyevo (Russian: Ермеке́ево; Bashkir: Йәрмәкәй, Yärmäkäy) is a rural locality (a selo) and the administrative center of Yermekeyevsky District in Bashkortostan, Russia. Population: 3,937 (2010 census);
