= Yermekeyevsky District =

Yermekeyevsky District Ермекеевский район (Russian)
- District

Other transcription(s)
  - Bashkir: Йәрмәкәй районы
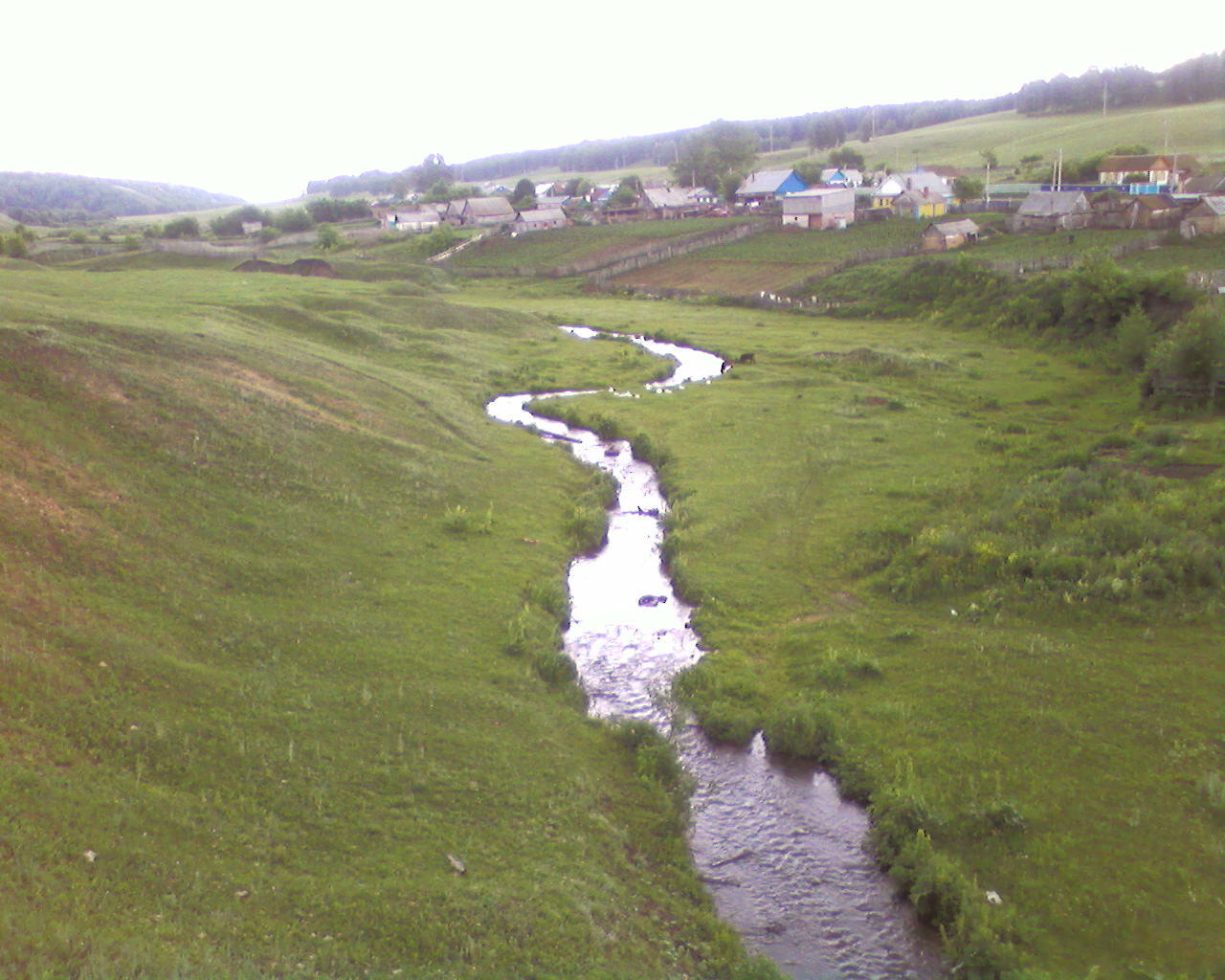
- Sharlama, Yermekeyevsky District

- Flag Coat of arms
- Location of Yermekeyevsky District in the Republic of Bashkortostan
- Coordinates: 54°05′N 53°40′E
- Country: Russia
- Federal subject: Republic of Bashkortostan
- Established: January 31, 1935
- Administrative center: Yermekeyevo

Area
  - Total: 1,437 km^{2} (555 sq mi)

Population (2010 Census)
  - Total: 17,162
  - Density: 11.94/km^{2} (30.93/sq mi)
  - Urban: 0%
  - Rural: 100%

Administrative structure
  - Administrative divisions: 13 Selsoviets
  - Inhabited localities: 51 rural localities

Municipal structure
  - Municipally incorporated as: Yermekeyevsky Municipal District
  - Municipal divisions: 0 urban settlements, 13 rural settlements
- Time zone: UTC+5 (MSK+2)
- OKTMO ID: 80625000
- Website: http://www.ermekeevo-rb.ru

Population of Yermekeyevsky District
- 2010 Census: 17,162
- 2002 Census: 18,205
- 1989 Census: 18,182
- 1979 Census: 22,435

Yermekeyevsky District (Russian: Ермеке́евский райо́н; Bashkir: Йәрмәкәй районы, Yärmäkäy rayonı; Tatar: Ярмәкәй районы, Yarmäkäy rayonı) is an administrative and municipal district (raion), one of the fifty-four in the Republic of Bashkortostan, Russia. It is located in the west of the republic and borders with Tuymazinsky District in the north, Belebeyevsky District in the east, Bizhbulyaksky District in the southeast, and with Orenburg Oblast and the Republic of Tatarstan in the west. The area of the district is 1,437 square kilometers (555 sq mi). Its administrative center is the rural locality (a selo) of Yermekeyevo. As of the 2010 Census, the total population of the district was 17,162, with the population of Yermekeyevo accounting for 22.9% of that number.

== History ==
The district was established on January 31, 1935.

== Administrative and municipal status ==
Within the framework of administrative divisions, Yermekeyevsky District is one of the fifty-four in the Republic of Bashkortostan. The district is divided into thirteen selsoviets, comprising fifty-one rural localities. As a municipal division, the district is incorporated as Yermekeyevsky Municipal District. Its thirteen selsoviets are incorporated as thirteen rural settlements within the municipal district. The selo of Yermekeyevo serves as the administrative center of both the administrative and municipal district.
