= Tuymazy =

Town in the Republic of Bashkortostan, Russia

Tuymazy Туймазы
- Town

Other transcription(s)
  - Bashkir: Туймазы
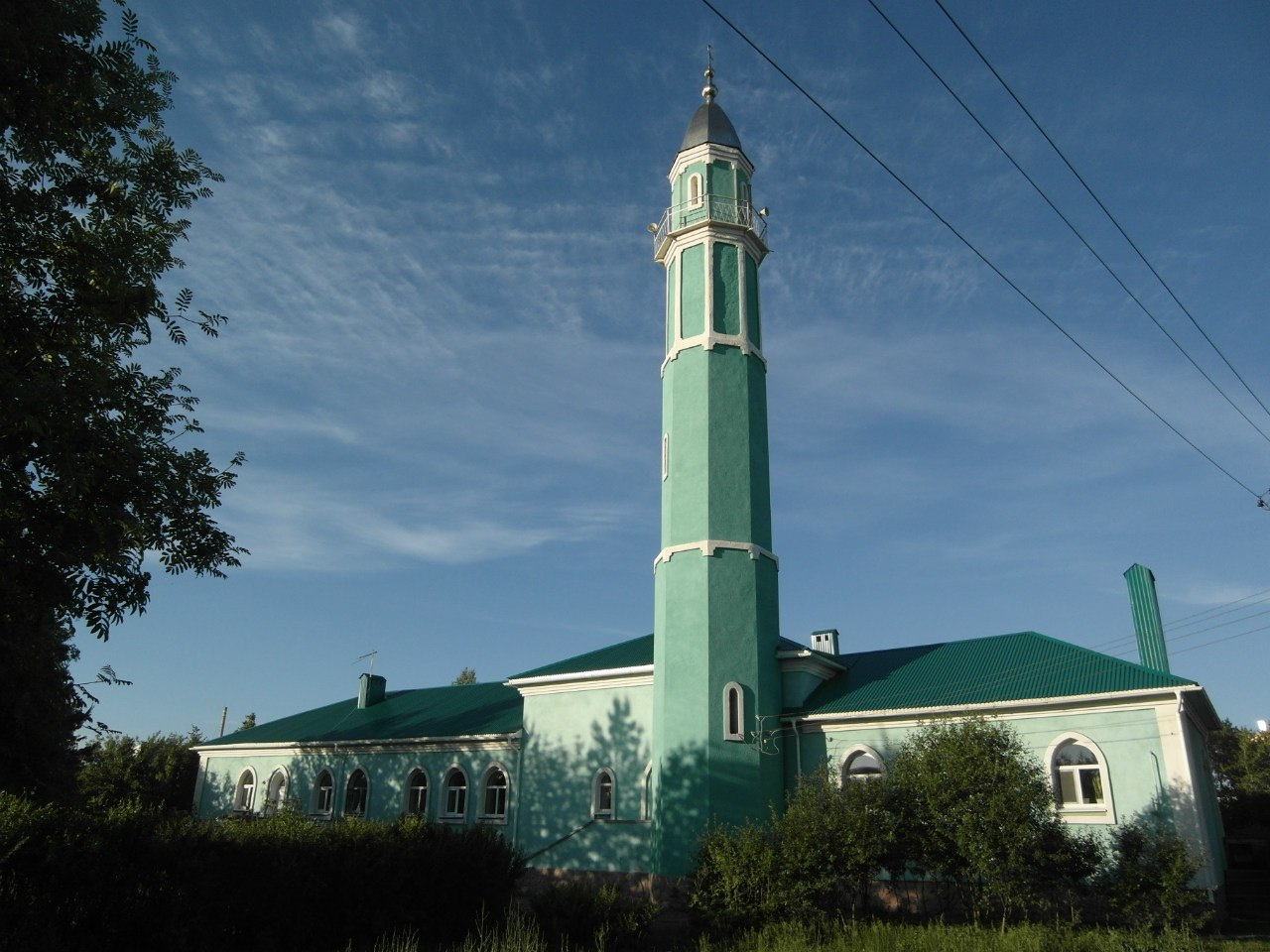
- Mosque al-Fatiha in Tuymazy

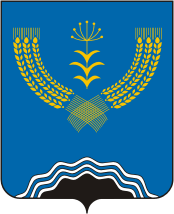
- Flag Coat of arms
- Interactive map of Tuymazy
- Location of Tuymazy Tuymazy (Bashkortostan)
- Coordinates: 54°36′N 53°42′E
- Country: Russia
- Federal subject: Bashkortostan
- Founded: 1912
- Town status since: 1960
- Elevation: 120 m (390 ft)

Population (2010 Census)
  - Total: 66,836
  - Estimate (2025): 67,209 (+0.6%)
  - Rank: 231st in 2010

Administrative status
  - Subordinated to: town of republic significance of Tuymazy
  - Capital of: Tuymazinsky District, town of republic significance of Tuymazy

Municipal status
  - Municipal district: Tuymazinsky Municipal District
  - Urban settlement: Tuymazy Urban Settlement
  - Capital of: Tuymazinsky Municipal District, Tuymazy Urban Settlement
- Time zone: UTC+5 (MSK+2)
- Postal code: 452750
- Dialing code: +7 34782
- OKTMO ID: 80651101001

Tuymazy (Russian: Туймазы́; Bashkir: Туймазы, Tuymazı) is a town in the Republic of Bashkortostan, Russia, located 145 kilometers (90 mi) from Ufa. Population: 66,836 (2010 census); 66,687 (2002 census); 57,887 (1989 Soviet census). It is an industrial town, with petroleum and natural gas industries and mechanical engineering being the most important economic assets.

== History ==
It was founded in 1912 as a railway station and was granted town status in 1960.

== Administrative and municipal status ==
Within the framework of administrative divisions, Tuymazy serves as the administrative center of Tuymazinsky District, even though it is not a part of it. As an administrative division, it is incorporated separately as the town of republic significance of Tuymazy—an administrative unit with the status equal to that of a district. As a municipal division, the town of republic significance of Tuymazy is incorporated within Tuymazinsky Municipal District as Tuymazy Urban Settlement.

== Demographics ==
According to the 2002 Census, the ethnic composition of the town was:

- Tatars: 44.6%
- Bashkirs: 25.3%
- Russians: 27.7%
- other ethnicities include the Chuvash people, the Mari people, Ukrainians, and others

== Gallery ==
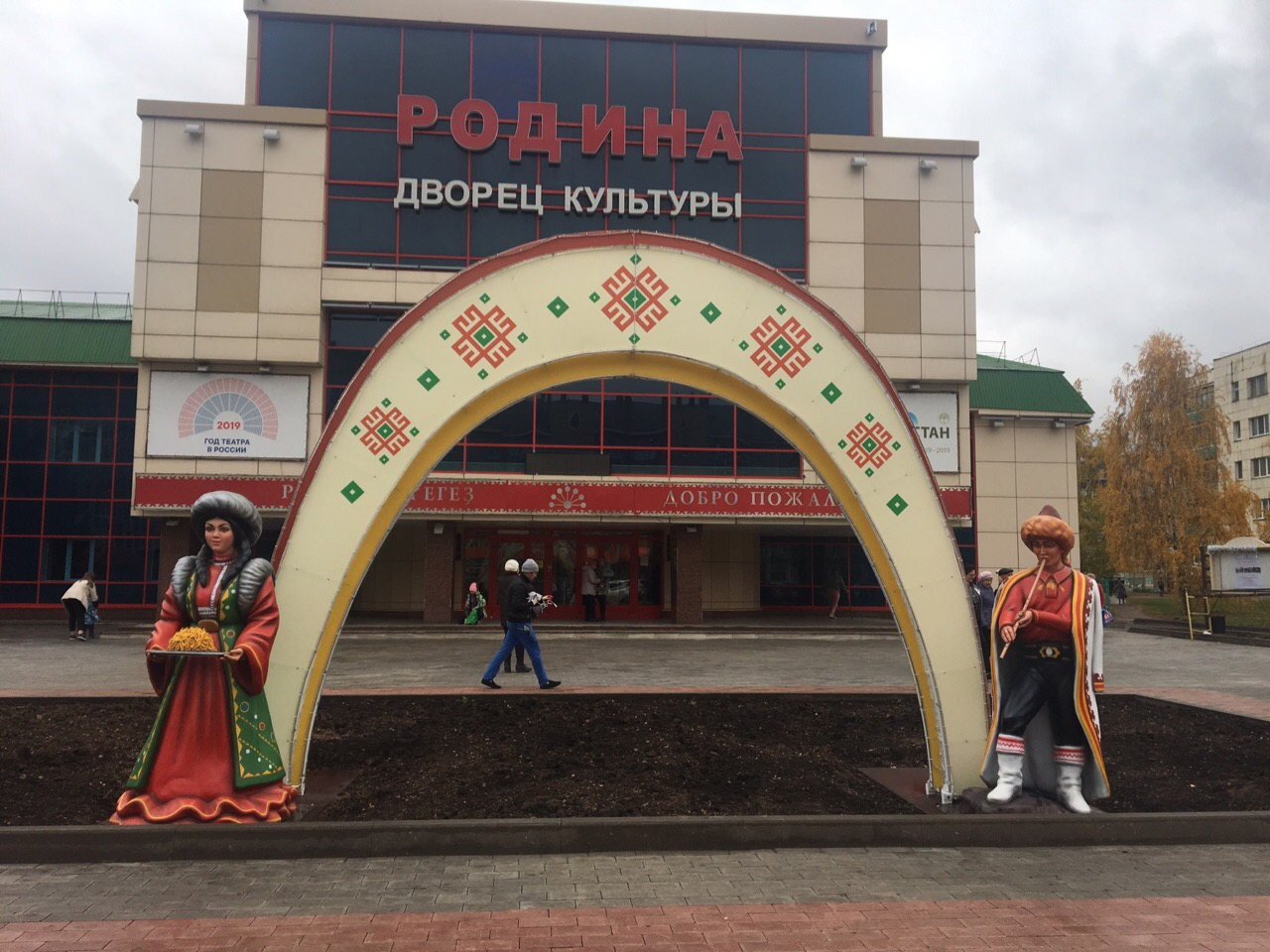
A Palace of Culture "The Homeland" (Дворец культуры «Родина»).

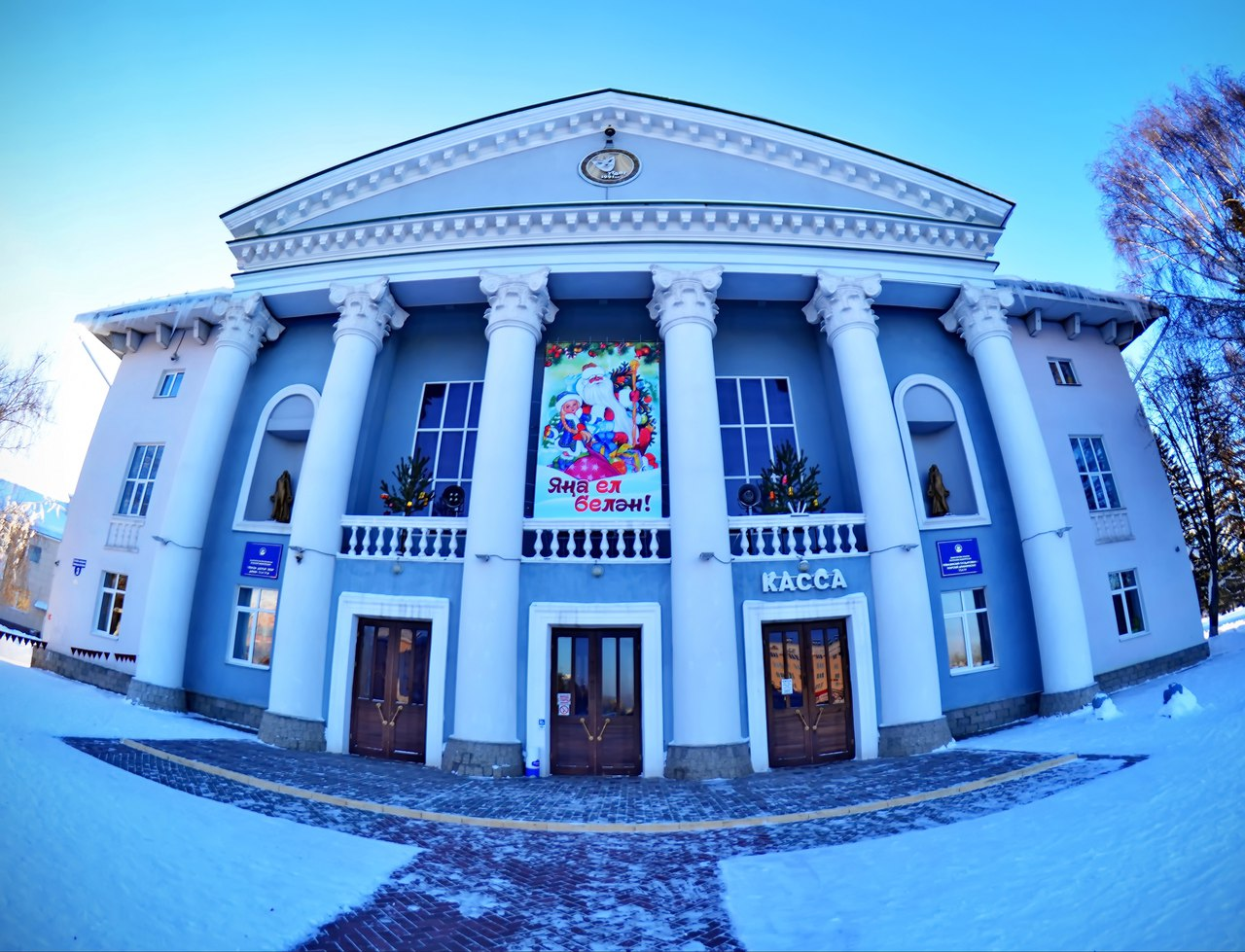
Tuymazy Drama Theater (Russian: Туймазинский драматический театр). inscription on the building "Happy New Year" (Tatar: Яңа ел белән)

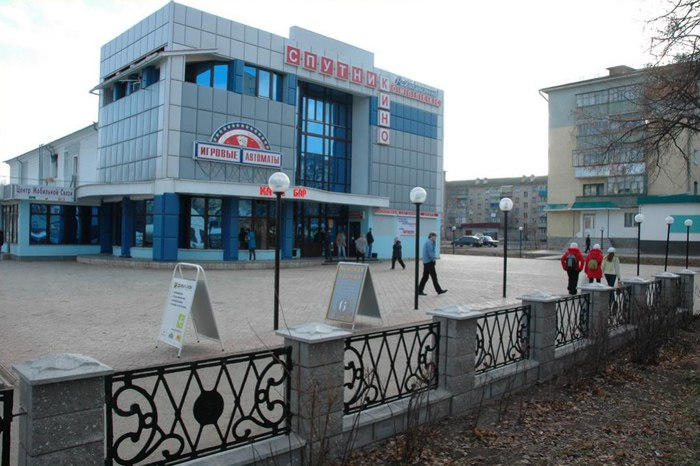
Cinematic Complex "Sputnik" ('satellite'; Russian: Кинокомплекс «Спутник»)

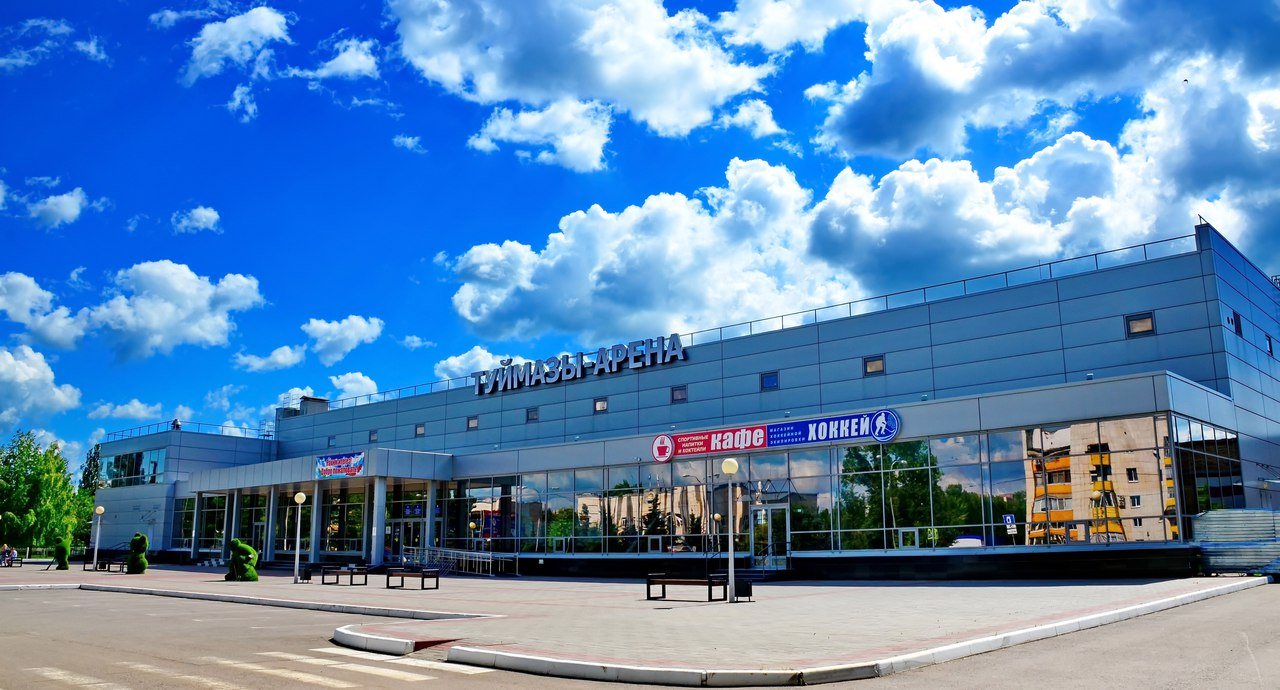
Tuymazy Arena named after S. N. Gimaev (УСЛК Туймазы-Арена имени С. Н. Гимаева)
