= Tuymazinsky District =

Tuymazinsky District Туймазинский район (Russian)
- District

Other transcription(s)
  - Bashkir: Туймазы районы
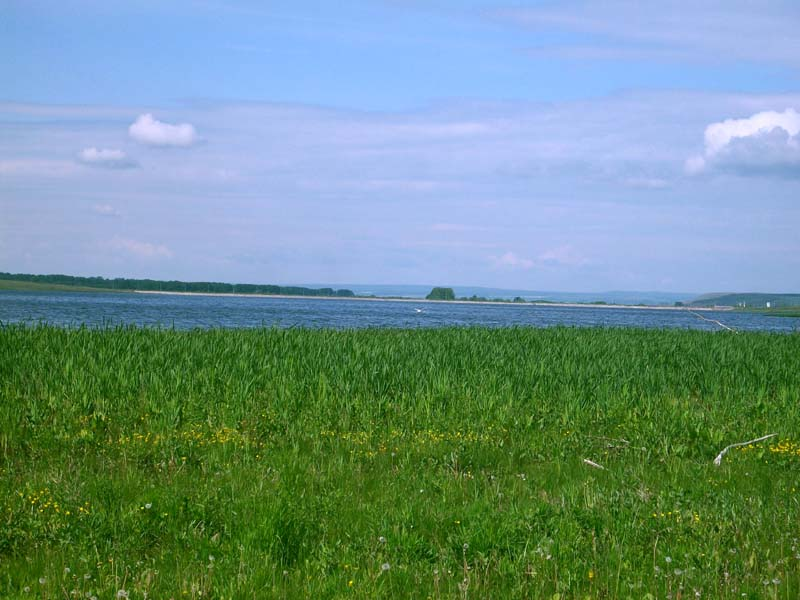
- View in Tuymazinsky District

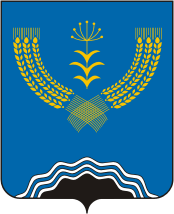
- Flag Coat of arms
- Location of Tuymazinsky District in the Republic of Bashkortostan
- Coordinates: 54°36′N 53°42′E
- Country: Russia
- Federal subject: Republic of Bashkortostan
- Established: August 20, 1930
- Administrative center: Tuymazy

Area
  - Total: 2,403 km^{2} (928 sq mi)

Population (2010 Census)
  - Total: 64,389
  - Estimate (2018): 132,448 (+105.7%)
  - Density: 26.80/km^{2} (69.40/sq mi)
  - Urban: 0%
  - Rural: 100%

Administrative structure
  - Administrative divisions: 18 Selsoviets
  - Inhabited localities: 113 rural localities

Municipal structure
  - Municipally incorporated as: Tuymazinsky Municipal District
  - Municipal divisions: 1 urban settlements, 18 rural settlements
- Time zone: UTC+5 (MSK+2)
- OKTMO ID: 80651000
- Website: http://www.tuimazirb.ru

Population of Tuymazinsky District
- 2010 Census: 64,389
- 2002 Census: 30,923
- 1989 Census: 30,200
- 1979 Census: 38,738

Tuymazinsky District (Russian: Туймази́нский райо́н; Bashkir and Tatar: Туймазы районы, Tuymazı rayonı) is an administrative and municipal district (raion), one of the fifty-four in the Republic of Bashkortostan, Russia. It is located in the west of the republic and borders with Sharansky District in the north, Buzdyaksky District in the east, Belebeyevsky District in the southeast and south, Yermekeyevsky District in the south, and with the Republic of Tatarstan in the west. The area of the district is 2,403 square kilometers (928 sq mi). Its administrative center is the town of Tuymazy (which is administratively separate from the district). As of the 2010 Census, the total population of the district was 64,389.

== History ==
The district was established on August 20, 1930. On March 20, 1937, the district was split into two—Tuymazinsky and Kandrinsky—but that was reversed in 1956.

== Administrative and municipal status ==
Within the framework of administrative divisions, Tuymazinsky District is one of the fifty-four in the Republic of Bashkortostan. It is divided into 18 selsoviets, comprising 113 rural localities. The town of Tuymazy serves as its administrative center, despite being incorporated separately as a town of republic significance—an administrative unit with the status equal to that of the districts.

As a municipal division, the district is incorporated as Tuymazinsky Municipal District, with the town of republic significance of Tuymazy being incorporated within it as Tuymazy Urban Settlement. Its eighteen selsoviets are incorporated as eighteen rural settlements within the municipal district. The town of Tuymazy serves as the administrative center of the municipal district as well.
