= Romanovka (inhabited locality) =

Romanovka (Russian: Романовка) is the name of several inhabited localities in Russia.

== Modern localities ==
=== Altai Krai ===
As of 2012, one rural locality in Altai Krai bears this name:

- Romanovka, Altai Krai, a selo in Novonikolayevsky Selsoviet of Rubtsovsky District; 51°23′N 81°31′E

=== Amur Oblast ===
As of 2012, one rural locality in Amur Oblast bears this name:

- Romanovka, Amur Oblast, a selo in Romanovsky Rural Settlement of Oktyabrsky District

=== Republic of Bashkortostan ===
As of 2012, five rural localities in the Republic of Bashkortostan bear this name:

- Romanovka, Birsky District, Republic of Bashkortostan, a village in Uguzevsky Selsoviet of Birsky District
- Romanovka, Chishminsky District, Republic of Bashkortostan, a selo in Chuvalkipovsky Selsoviet of Chishminsky District
- Romanovka, Davlekanovsky District, Republic of Bashkortostan, a village in Alginsky Selsoviet of Davlekanovsky District
- Romanovka, Karmaskalinsky District, Republic of Bashkortostan, a village in Kabakovsky Selsoviet of Karmaskalinsky District
- Romanovka, Meleuzovsky District, Republic of Bashkortostan, a village in Partizansky Selsoviet of Meleuzovsky District

=== Belgorod Oblast ===
As of 2012, one rural locality in Belgorod Oblast bears this name:

- Romanovka, Belgorod Oblast, a selo in Krasnoyaruzhsky District

=== Bryansk Oblast ===
As of 2012, three rural localities in Bryansk Oblast bear this name:

- Romanovka, Dyatkovsky District, Bryansk Oblast, a village in Bolshezhukovsky Rural Administrative Okrug of Dyatkovsky District; 53°36′N 34°28′E
- Romanovka, Kletnyansky District, Bryansk Oblast, a village in Lutensky Rural Administrative Okrug of Kletnyansky District; 53°25′N 33°7′E
- Romanovka, Pogarsky District, Bryansk Oblast, a village in Stechensky Rural Administrative Okrug of Pogarsky District; 52°35′N 33°27′E

=== Republic of Buryatia ===
As of 2012, one rural locality in the Republic of Buryatia bears this name:

- Romanovka, Republic of Buryatia, a selo in Vitimsky Selsoviet of Bauntovsky District

=== Chelyabinsk Oblast ===
As of 2012, one rural locality in Chelyabinsk Oblast bears this name:

- Romanovka, Chelyabinsk Oblast, a selo in Romanovsky Selsoviet of Satkinsky District

=== Republic of Dagestan ===
- Lyuksemburg, a village in Babayurtovsky District formerly known as Romanovka

=== Kaluga Oblast ===
As of 2012, three rural localities in Kaluga Oblast bear this name:

- Romanovka, Lyudinovsky District, Kaluga Oblast, a village in Lyudinovsky District
- Romanovka, Tarussky District, Kaluga Oblast, a village in Tarussky District
- Romanovka, Ulyanovsky District, Kaluga Oblast, a village in Ulyanovsky District

=== Kostanay Region (Kazakhstan) ===
- Romanovka, Kostanay Region, or Boris-Romanovka is a village in the Kostanay Region, 53.62°N 63.86°E

=== Krasnoyarsk Krai ===
As of 2012, three rural localities in Krasnoyarsk Krai bear this name:

- Romanovka, Idrinsky District, Krasnoyarsk Krai, a selo in Romanovsky Selsoviet of Idrinsky District
- Romanovka, Nizhneingashsky District, Krasnoyarsk Krai, a village in Novoalexandrovsky Selsoviet of Nizhneingashsky District
- Romanovka, Tyukhtetsky District, Krasnoyarsk Krai, a village in Tyukhtetsky Selsoviet of Tyukhtetsky District

=== Kurgan Oblast ===
As of 2012, one rural locality in Kurgan Oblast bears this name:

- Romanovka, Kurgan Oblast, a village in Sadovsky Selsoviet of Ketovsky District; 55°21′N 65°4′E

=== Kursk Oblast ===
As of 2012, two rural localities in Kursk Oblast bear this name:

- Romanovka, Dmitriyevsky District, Kursk Oblast, a selo in Novopershinsky Selsoviet of Dmitriyevsky District
- Romanovka, Medvensky District, Kursk Oblast, a village in Kitayevsky Selsoviet of Medvensky District

=== Leningrad Oblast ===
As of 2012, two rural localities in Leningrad Oblast bear this name:

- Romanovka, Gatchinsky District, Leningrad Oblast, a village in Verevskoye Settlement Municipal Formation of Gatchinsky District; 59°38′N 30°13′E
- Romanovka, Vsevolozhsky District, Leningrad Oblast, a settlement in Romanovskoye Settlement Municipal Formation of Vsevolozhsky District; 60°3′N 30°43′E

=== Republic of Mordovia ===
As of 2012, two rural localities in the Republic of Mordovia bear this name:

- Romanovka, Lyambirsky District, Republic of Mordovia, a village in Mikhaylovsky Selsoviet of Lyambirsky District; 54°17′N 45°32′E
- Romanovka, Zubovo-Polyansky District, Republic of Mordovia, a settlement in Kargashinsky Selsoviet of Zubovo-Polyansky District; 54°15′N 42°43′E

=== Moscow Oblast ===
As of 2012, three rural localities in Moscow Oblast bear this name:

- Romanovka, Kashirsky District, Moscow Oblast, a village in Topkanovskoye Rural Settlement of Kashirsky District; 54°40′N 38°26′E
- Romanovka, Kolomensky District, Moscow Oblast, a village in Biorkovskoye Rural Settlement of Kolomensky District; 55°2′N 38°36′E
- Romanovka, Serpukhovsky District, Moscow Oblast, a village in Dashkovskoye Rural Settlement of Serpukhovsky District; 54°58′N 37°11′E

=== Nizhny Novgorod Oblast ===
As of 2012, four rural localities in Nizhny Novgorod Oblast bear this name:

- Romanovka, Lukoyanovsky District, Nizhny Novgorod Oblast, a selo in Kudeyarovsky Selsoviet of Lukoyanovsky District; 54°57′N 44°21′E
- Romanovka, Deyanovsky Selsoviet, Pilninsky District, Nizhny Novgorod Oblast, a village in Deyanovsky Selsoviet of Pilninsky District; 55°48′N 45°56′E
- Romanovka, Medyansky Selsoviet, Pilninsky District, Nizhny Novgorod Oblast, a selo in Medyansky Selsoviet of Pilninsky District; 55°31′N 46°3′E
- Romanovka, Pochinkovsky District, Nizhny Novgorod Oblast, a village in Naruksovsky Selsoviet of Pochinkovsky District; 54°45′N 44°28′E

=== Novosibirsk Oblast ===
As of 2012, two rural localities in Novosibirsk Oblast bear this name:

- Romanovka, Bagansky District, Novosibirsk Oblast, a village in Bagansky District
- Romanovka, Chistoozyorny District, Novosibirsk Oblast, a selo in Chistoozyorny District

=== Orenburg Oblast ===
As of 2012, four rural localities in Orenburg Oblast bear this name:

- Romanovka, Ponomaryovsky District, Orenburg Oblast, a selo in Romanovsky Selsoviet of Ponomaryovsky District
- Romanovka, Sharlyksky District, Orenburg Oblast, a selo in Bogorodsky Selsoviet of Sharlyksky District
- Romanovka, Sorochinsky District, Orenburg Oblast, a selo in Romanovsky Selsoviet of Sorochinsky District
- Romanovka, Tyulgansky District, Orenburg Oblast, a selo in Blagodarnovsky Selsoviet of Tyulgansky District

=== Primorsky Krai ===
As of 2012, one rural locality in Primorsky Krai bears this name:

- Romanovka, Primorsky Krai, a selo in Shkotovsky District

=== Rostov Oblast ===
As of 2012, one rural locality in Rostov Oblast bears this name:

- Romanovka, Rostov Oblast, a selo in Novoyegorlykskoye Rural Settlement of Salsky District

=== Ryazan Oblast ===
As of 2012, two rural localities in Ryazan Oblast bear this name:

- Romanovka, Sarayevsky District, Ryazan Oblast, a village in Alexeyevsky Rural Okrug of Sarayevsky District
- Romanovka, Spassky District, Ryazan Oblast, a village in Razberdeyevsky Rural Okrug of Spassky District

=== Samara Oblast ===
As of 2012, two rural localities in Samara Oblast bear this name:

- Romanovka, Khvorostyansky District, Samara Oblast, a selo in Khvorostyansky District
- Romanovka, Shentalinsky District, Samara Oblast, a settlement in Shentalinsky District

=== Saratov Oblast ===
As of 2012, two inhabited localities in Saratov Oblast bear this name:

- Romanovka, Romanovsky District, Saratov Oblast, an urban locality (a work settlement) in Romanovsky District
- Romanovka, Fyodorovsky District, Saratov Oblast, a rural locality (a selo) in Fyodorovsky District

=== Tambov Oblast ===
As of 2012, two rural localities in Tambov Oblast bear this name:

- Romanovka, Inzhavinsky District, Tambov Oblast, a settlement in Mikhaylovsky Selsoviet of Inzhavinsky District
- Romanovka, Tokaryovsky District, Tambov Oblast, a village in Abakumovsky Selsoviet of Tokaryovsky District

=== Tomsk Oblast ===
As of 2012, one rural locality in Tomsk Oblast bears this name:

- Romanovka, Tomsk Oblast, a village in Tomsky District

=== Tula Oblast ===
As of 2012, one rural locality in Tula Oblast bears this name:

- Romanovka, Tula Oblast, a village in Arkhangelsky Rural Okrug of Kamensky District

=== Volgograd Oblast ===
As of 2012, two rural localities in Volgograd Oblast bear this name:

- Romanovka, Olkhovsky District, Volgograd Oblast, a selo in Romanovsky Selsoviet of Olkhovsky District
- Romanovka, Zhirnovsky District, Volgograd Oblast, a selo in Klenovsky Selsoviet of Zhirnovsky District

=== Voronezh Oblast ===
As of 2012, one rural locality in Voronezh Oblast bears this name:

- Romanovka, Voronezh Oblast, a selo in Nashchekinskoye Rural Settlement of Anninsky District

=== Yaroslavl Oblast ===
As of 2012, one rural locality in Yaroslavl Oblast bears this name:

- Romanovka, Yaroslavl Oblast, a village in Zarubinsky Rural Okrug of Myshkinsky District

== Abolished localities ==
- Romanovka, Tyumen Oblast, a village in Bolshekrasnoyarsky Rural Okrug of Omutinsky District, Tyumen Oblast; merged into the village of Tomskaya in October 2014

== Alternative names ==
- Romanovka, alternative name of Staraya Romanovka, a village in Novoromanovsky Rural Administrative Okrug of Mglinsky District in Bryansk Oblast; 52°58′N 32°58′E
- Romanovka, alternative name of Romanovsky, a settlement in Ust-Sosnovskaya Rural Territory of Topkinsky District in Kemerovo Oblast; 55°17′N 85°1′E
- Romanovka, alternative name of Novaya Romanovka, a selo in Novoromanovsky Rural Administrative Okrug of Mglinsky District in Bryansk Oblast; 53°1′N 32°57′E
