= Chishma =

Chishma is the name of several rural localities in Russia, including:

- Chishma, Baltachevsky District, Republic of Bashkortostan
- Chishma, Balyklykulsky Selsoviet, Aurgazinsky District, Republic of Bashkortostan
- Chishma, Buzdyaksky District, Republic of Bashkortostan
- Chishma, Chishminsky Selsoviet, Birsky District, Republic of Bashkortostan
- Chishma, Dyurtyulinsky District, Republic of Bashkortostan
- Chishma, Karmaskalinsky District, Republic of Bashkortostan
- Chishma, Neftekamsk, Republic of Bashkortostan
- Chishma, Sultanmuratovsky Selsoviet, Aurgazinsky District, Republic of Bashkortostan
- Chishma, Tatyshlinsky District, Republic of Bashkortostan
- Chishma, Uguzevsky Selsoviet, Birsky District, Republic of Bashkortostan
- Chishma, Aktanyshsky District, Republic of Tatarstan, a rural locality (a selo) in Aktanyshsky District of the Republic of Tatarstan
- Chishma, Nurlatsky District, Republic of Tatarstan, a rural locality (a settlement) in Nurlatsky District of the Republic of Tatarstan
