= Chishmy (inhabited locality) =

Chishmy (Russian: Чишмы) is the name of several inhabited localities in the Republic of Bashkortostan, Russia.

== Modern localities ==
Urban localities

- Chishmy, a work settlement in Chishminsky District; 54°36′N 55°24′E

Rural localities

- Chishmy, Chishminsky Selsoviet, Chishminsky District, Republic of Bashkortostan, a selo in Chishminsky Selsoviet of Chishminsky District
- Chishmy, Miyakinsky District, Republic of Bashkortostan, a village in Urshakbashkaramalinsky Selsoviet of Miyakinsky District; 53°41′N 55°16′E

== Alternative names ==
- Chishmy, alternative name of Chishma, a village in Kuzeyevsky Selsoviet of Buzdyaksky District; 54°55′N 54°40′E
- Chishmy, alternative name of Chishma, a village in Adzitarovsky Selsoviet of Karmaskalinsky District; 54°16′N 55°33′E
- Chishmy, alternative name of Chishma, a selo in Ismailovsky Selsoviet of Dyurtyulinsky District; 55°32′N 54°35′E

== See also ==
- Chishma
