= Osinovka =

Osinovka may refer to:

- Osinovka, until 1938, name of the town of Osinniki in Kemerovo Oblast, Russia
- Osinovka, a former urban-type settlement in Irkutsk Oblast, Russia; since 1999—part of the city of Bratsk
- Osinovka, Primorsky Krai, a village (selo) in Primorsky Krai, Russia
- Osinovka, Republic of Tatarstan, a village in the Republic of Tatarstan, Russia
- Osinovka, name of several other rural localities in Russia including:
  - Osinovka, Birsky District, Republic of Bashkortostan
  - Osinovka, Polozovskoye Rural Settlement, Bolshesosnovsky District, Perm Krai
  - Osinovka, Votchinsky Selsoviet, Vologodsky District, Vologda Oblast
