= Samosadka =

Samosadka Самосадка
- Village
- Location within Bashkortostan Location within Russia
- Coordinates: 55°31′N 55°33′E
- Country: Russia
- Region: Bashkortostan
- District: Birsky District
- Time zone: UTC+5:00

Samosadka (Russian: Самосадка) is a rural locality (a village) in Bakhtybayevsky Selsoviet, Birsky District, Bashkortostan, Russia. The population was 28 as of 2010. There are 6 streets.

== Geography ==
Samosadka is located 17 km north of Birsk (the district's administrative centre) by road. Vyazovsky is the nearest rural locality.
