= Akudibashevo =

Akudibashevo Акудибашево
- Selo
- Location within Bashkortostan Location within Russia
- Coordinates: 55°20′N 55°16′E
- Country: Russia
- Region: Bashkortostan
- District: Birsky District
- Time zone: UTC+5:00

Akudibashevo (Russian: Акудибашево; Bashkir: Акудибаш, Akudibaş) is a rural locality (a selo) in Kusekeyevsky Selsoviet, Birsky District, Bashkortostan, Russia. The population was 270 as of 2010. There are 7 streets.

== Geography ==
Akudibashevo is located 21 km southwest of Birsk (the district's administrative centre) by road. Penkovo is the nearest rural locality.
