= Venetsiya =

Venetsiya Венеция
- Village
- Location within Bashkortostan Location within Russia
- Coordinates: 55°30′N 54°53′E
- Country: Russia
- Region: Bashkortostan
- District: Dyurtyulinsky District
- Time zone: UTC+5:00

Venetsiya (Russian: Венеция) is a rural locality (a village) in Takarlikovsky Selsoviet, Dyurtyulinsky District, Bashkortostan, Russia. The population was 76 as of 2010. There is 1 street.

== Geography ==
Venetsiya is located 14 km northeast of Dyurtyuli (the district's administrative centre) by road. Dyurtyuli is the nearest rural locality.
