= Aybashevo =

Aybashevo Айбашево
- Village
- Location within Bashkortostan Location within Russia
- Coordinates: 55°14′N 55°21′E
- Country: Russia
- Region: Bashkortostan
- District: Birsky District
- Time zone: UTC+5:00

Aybashevo (Russian: Айбашево; Bashkir: Айбаш, Aybaş) is a rural locality (a village) in Berezovsky Selsoviet, Birsky District, Bashkortostan, Russia. The population was 30 as of 2010. There is 1 street.

== Geography ==
Aybashevo is located 33 km southwest of Birsk (the district's administrative centre) by road. Berezovka is the nearest rural locality.
