= Novy Ural =

Novy Ural Новый Урал
- Village
- Location within Bashkortostan Location within Russia
- Coordinates: 55°14′N 54°51′E
- Country: Russia
- Region: Bashkortostan
- District: Dyurtyulinsky District
- Time zone: UTC+5:00

Novy Ural (Russian: Новый Урал; Bashkir: Яңы Урал, Yañı Ural) is a rural locality (a village) in Kukkuyanovsky Selsoviet, Dyurtyulinsky District, Bashkortostan, Russia. The population was 28 as of 2010. There are 2 streets.

== Geography ==
Novy Ural is located 42 km southwest of Dyurtyuli (the district's administrative centre) by road. Tuzlukushevo is the nearest rural locality.
