= Nazitamak =

Nazitamak Назитамак
- Village
- Location within Bashkortostan Location within Russia
- Coordinates: 55°25′N 54°42′E
- Country: Russia
- Region: Bashkortostan
- District: Dyurtyulinsky District
- Time zone: UTC+5:00

Nazitamak (Russian: Назитамак; Bashkir: Наҙытамаҡ, Naźıtamaq) is a rural locality (a village) in Asyanovsky Selsoviet, Dyurtyulinsky District, Bashkortostan, Russia. The population was 137 as of 2010. There are 2 streets.

== Geography ==
Nazitamak is located 18 km southwest of Dyurtyuli (the district's administrative centre) by road. Asyanovo is the nearest rural locality.
