= Desyatkino =

Desyatkino Десяткино
- Selo
- Location within Bashkortostan Location within Russia
- Coordinates: 55°24′N 55°44′E
- Country: Russia
- Region: Bashkortostan
- District: Birsky District
- Time zone: UTC+5:00

Desyatkino (Russian: Десяткино) is a rural locality (a selo) in Suslovsky Selsoviet, Birsky District, Bashkortostan, Russia. The population was 42 as of 2010. There are 5 streets.

== Geography ==
Desyatkino is located 15 km east of Birsk (the district's administrative centre) by road. Suslovo is the nearest rural locality.
