= Silantyevo =

Silantyevo Силантьево
- Selo
- Location within Bashkortostan Location within Russia
- Coordinates: 55°19′N 55°31′E
- Country: Russia
- Region: Bashkortostan
- District: Birsky District
- Time zone: UTC+5:00

Silantyevo (Russian: Силантьево) is a rural locality (a selo) and the administrative centre of Silantyevsky Selsoviet, Birsky District, Bashkortostan, Russia. The population was 677 as of 2010. There are 10 streets.

== Geography ==
Silantyevo is located 12 km (7.5 mi) south of Birsk (the district's administrative centre) by road. Nikolsky is the nearest rural locality.
