= Staropetrovo =

Staropetrovo Старопетрово
- Selo
- Location within Bashkortostan Location within Russia
- Coordinates: 55°15′N 55°33′E
- Country: Russia
- Region: Bashkortostan
- District: Birsky District
- Time zone: UTC+5:00

Staropetrovo (Russian: Старопетрово) is a rural locality (a selo) in Staropetrovsky Selsoviet, Birsky District, Bashkortostan, Russia. The population was 216 as of 2010. There are 5 streets.

== Geography ==
Staropetrovo is located 21 km south of Birsk (the district's administrative centre) by road. Pityakovo is the nearest rural locality.
