= Sultanbekovo, Dyurtyulinsky District, Republic of Bashkortostan =

Sultanbekovo Султанбеково
- Village
- Location within Bashkortostan Location within Russia
- Coordinates: 55°24′N 54°50′E
- Country: Russia
- Region: Bashkortostan
- District: Dyurtyulinsky District
- Time zone: UTC+5:00

Sultanbekovo (Russian: Султанбеково; Bashkir: Солтанбәк, Soltanbäk) is a rural locality (a village) in Taymurzinsky Selsoviet, Dyurtyulinsky District, Bashkortostan, Russia. The population was 182 as of 2010. There are 2 streets.

== Geography ==
Sultanbekovo is located 11 km southwest of Dyurtyuli (the district's administrative centre) by road. Taymurzino is the nearest rural locality.
