= Kriushi =

Kriushi Криуши
- Selo
- Location within Bashkortostan Location within Russia
- Coordinates: 55°14′N 55°43′E
- Country: Russia
- Region: Bashkortostan
- District: Birsky District
- Time zone: UTC+5:00

Kriushi (Russian: Криуши; Bashkir: Керәүеш, Keräweş) is a rural locality (a selo) in Kalinnikovsky Selsoviet, Birsky District, Bashkortostan, Russia. The population was 56 as of 2010. There are 3 streets.

== Geography ==
Kriushi is located 32 km southeast of Birsk (the district's administrative centre) by road. Kalinniki is the nearest rural locality.
