= Starokangyshevo =

Starokangyshevo Старокангышево
- Selo
- Location within Bashkortostan Location within Russia
- Coordinates: 55°35′N 54°57′E
- Country: Russia
- Region: Bashkortostan
- District: Dyurtyulinsky District
- Time zone: UTC+5:00

Starokangyshevo (Russian: Старокангышево; Bashkir: Иҫке Кәңгеш, İśke Käñgeş) is a rural locality (a selo) in Mayadykovsky Selsoviet, Dyurtyulinsky District, Bashkortostan, Russia. The population was 125 as of 2010. There are 5 streets.

== Geography ==
Starokangyshevo is located 25 km northeast of Dyurtyuli (the district's administrative centre) by road. Mayadyk is the nearest rural locality.
