= Novoyantuzovo =

Novoyantuzovo Новоянтузово
- Selo
- Location within Bashkortostan Location within Russia
- Coordinates: 55°30′N 55°15′E
- Country: Russia
- Region: Bashkortostan
- District: Birsky District
- Time zone: UTC+5:00

Novoyantuzovo (Russian: Новоянтузово; Bashkir: Яңы Яндыҙ, Yañı Yandıź) is a rural locality (a selo) in Verkhnelachentausky Selsoviet, Birsky District, Bashkortostan, Russia. The population was 286 as of 2010. There are 6 streets.

== Geography ==
Novoyantuzovo is located 40 km northwest of Birsk (the district's administrative centre) by road. Yeldyak is the nearest rural locality.
