= Ildus =

Ildus Ильдус
- Village
- Location within Bashkortostan Location within Russia
- Coordinates: 55°23′N 55°13′E
- Country: Russia
- Region: Bashkortostan
- District: Dyurtyulinsky District
- Time zone: UTC+5:00

Ildus (Russian: Ильдус; Bashkir: Илдус, İldus) is a rural locality (a village) in Starobaishevsky Selsoviet, Dyurtyulinsky District, Bashkortostan, Russia. The population was 41 as of 2010. There is 1 street.

== Geography ==
Ildus is located 32 km southeast of Dyurtyuli (the district's administrative centre) by road. Aygildino is the nearest rural locality.
