= Gublyukuchukovo =

Gublyukuchukovo Гублюкучуково
- Selo
- Location within Bashkortostan Location within Russia
- Coordinates: 55°29′N 54°48′E
- Country: Russia
- Region: Bashkortostan
- District: Dyurtyulinsky District
- Time zone: UTC+5:00

Gublyukuchukovo (Russian: Гублюкучуково; Bashkir: Гөблөкөсөк, Göblökösök) is a rural locality (a selo) in Takarlikovsky Selsoviet, Dyurtyulinsky District, Bashkortostan, Russia. The population was 392 as of 2010. There are 8 streets.

== Geography ==
Gublyukuchukovo is located 5 km west of Dyurtyuli (the district's administrative centre) by road. Ivanayevo is the nearest rural locality.
