= Shestykovo =

Shestykovo Шестыково
- Selo
- Location within Bashkortostan Location within Russia
- Coordinates: 55°27′N 55°42′E
- Country: Russia
- Region: Bashkortostan
- District: Birsky District
- Time zone: UTC+5:00

Shestykovo (Russian: Шестыково) is a rural locality (a selo) in Suslovsky Selsoviet, Birsky District, Bashkortostan, Russia. The population was 217 as of 2010. There are 8 streets.

== Geography ==
Shestykovo is located 17 km northeast of Birsk (the district's administrative centre) by road. Demidovsky is the nearest rural locality.
