= Tamakovo =

Tamakovo Тамаково
- Village
- Location within Bashkortostan Location within Russia
- Coordinates: 55°21′N 54°59′E
- Country: Russia
- Region: Bashkortostan
- District: Dyurtyulinsky District
- Time zone: UTC+5:00

Tamakovo (Russian: Тамаково; Bashkir: Тамаҡ, Tamaq) is a rural locality (a village) in Moskovsky Selsoviet, Dyurtyulinsky District, Bashkortostan, Russia. The population was 38 as of 2010. There is 1 street.

== Geography ==
Tamakovo is located 33 km southeast of Dyurtyuli (the district's administrative centre) by road. Imay-Utarovo is the nearest rural locality.
