= Baygildy =

Baygildy Байгильды
- Selo
- Location within Bashkortostan Location within Russia
- Coordinates: 55°31′N 55°09′E
- Country: Russia
- Region: Bashkortostan
- District: Dyurtyulinsky District
- Time zone: UTC+5:00

Baygildy (Russian: Байгильды; Bashkir: Байгилде, Baygilde) is a rural locality (a selo) in Staroyantuzovsky Selsoviet, Dyurtyulinsky District, Bashkortostan, Russia. The population was 378 as of 2010. There are 9 streets.

== Geography ==
Baygildy is located 30 km northeast of Dyurtyuli (the district's administrative centre) by road. Kazy-Yeldyak is the nearest rural locality.
