= Salparovo =

Salparovo Салпарово
- Village
- Location within Bashkortostan Location within Russia
- Coordinates: 55°21′N 54°54′E
- Country: Russia
- Region: Bashkortostan
- District: Dyurtyulinsky District
- Time zone: UTC+5:00

Salparovo (Russian: Салпарово; Bashkir: Салпар, Salpar) is a rural locality (a village) in Taymurzinsky Selsoviet, Dyurtyulinsky District, Bashkortostan, Russia. The population was 85 as of 2010. There is 1 street.

== Geography ==
Salparovo is located 19 km south of Dyurtyuli (the district's administrative centre) by road. Taymurzino is the nearest rural locality.
