= Mamadalevo =

Mamadalevo Мамадалево
- Village
- Location within Bashkortostan Location within Russia
- Coordinates: 55°25′N 54°56′E
- Country: Russia
- Region: Bashkortostan
- District: Dyurtyulinsky District
- Time zone: UTC+5:00

Mamadalevo (Russian: Мамадалево; Bashkir: Мәмәдәл, Mämädäl) is a rural locality (a village) in Sukkulovsky Selsoviet, Dyurtyulinsky District, Bashkortostan, Russia. The population was 183 as of 2010. There are 3 streets.

== Geography ==
Mamadalevo is located 11 km southeast of Dyurtyuli (the district's administrative centre) by road. Sukkulovo is the nearest rural locality.
