= Atachevo =

Atachevo Атачево
- Village
- Location within Bashkortostan Location within Russia
- Coordinates: 55°42′N 54°57′E
- Country: Russia
- Region: Bashkortostan
- District: Dyurtyulinsky District
- Time zone: UTC+5:00

Atachevo (Russian: Атачево; Bashkir: Әтәс, Ätäs) is a rural locality (a village) in Mayadykovsky Selsoviet, Dyurtyulinsky District, Bashkortostan, Russia. The population was 363 as of 2010. There is 1 street.

== Geography ==
Atachevo is located 41 km north of Dyurtyuli (the district's administrative centre) by road. Atachevo is the nearest rural locality.
