= Shelkanovo, Birsky District, Republic of Bashkortostan =

Shelkanovo Шелканово
- Selo
- Location within Bashkortostan Location within Russia
- Coordinates: 55°16′N 55°09′E
- Country: Russia
- Region: Bashkortostan
- District: Birsky District
- Time zone: UTC+5:00

Shelkanovo (Russian: Шелканово; Bashkir: Шалҡан, Şalqan) is a rural locality (a selo) in Mayadykovsky Selsoviet, Birsky District, Bashkortostan, Russia. The population was 576 as of 2010. There are 8 streets.

== Geography ==
Shelkanovo is located 32 km southwest of Birsk (the district's administrative centre) by road. Akkainovo is the nearest rural locality.
