= Verkhnelachentau =

Verkhnelachentau Верхнелачентау
- Selo
- Location within Bashkortostan Location within Russia
- Coordinates: 55°28′N 55°22′E
- Country: Russia
- Region: Bashkortostan
- District: Birsky District
- Time zone: UTC+5:00

Verkhnelachentau (Russian: Верхнелачентау; Bashkir: Үрге Ыласынтау, Ürge Ilısıntaw) is a rural locality (a selo) and the administrative centre of Verkhnelachentausky Selsoviet, Birsky District, Bashkortostan, Russia. The population was 238 as of 2010. There are 3 streets.

== Geography ==
Verkhnelachentau is located 33 km northwest of Birsk (the district's administrative centre) by road. Nizhnelachentau is the nearest rural locality.
