= Tashtau =

Tashtau Таштау
- Selo
- Location within Bashkortostan Location within Russia
- Coordinates: 55°20′N 54°44′E
- Country: Russia
- Region: Bashkortostan
- District: Dyurtyulinsky District
- Time zone: UTC+5:00

Tashtau (Russian: Таштау; Bashkir: Таштау, Taştaw) is a rural locality (a selo) in Semiletovsky Selsoviet, Dyurtyulinsky District, Bashkortostan, Russia. The population was 212 as of 2010. There are 3 streets.

== Geography ==
Tashtau is located 21 km southwest of Dyurtyuli (the district's administrative centre) by road. Nizhneatashevo is the nearest rural locality.
