= Kushulevo =

Kushulevo Кушулево
- Selo
- Location within Bashkortostan Location within Russia
- Coordinates: 55°30′N 54°46′E
- Country: Russia
- Region: Bashkortostan
- District: Dyurtyulinsky District
- Time zone: UTC+5:00

Kushulevo (Russian: Кушулево; Bashkir: Көшөл, Köşöl) is a rural locality (a selo) in Takarlikovsky Selsoviet, Dyurtyulinsky District, Bashkortostan, Russia. The population was 407 as of 2010. There are 15 streets.

== Geography ==
Kushulevo is located 7 km northwest of Dyurtyuli (the district's administrative centre) by road. Yuntiryak is the nearest rural locality.
