= Yangitau =

Yangitau Янгитау
- Khutor
- Location within Bashkortostan Location within Russia
- Coordinates: 55°28′N 55°36′E
- Country: Russia
- Region: Bashkortostan
- District: Birsky District
- Time zone: UTC+5:00

Yangitau (Russian: Янгитау; Bashkir: Яңытау, Yañıtaw) is a rural locality (a khutor) in Burnovsky Selsoviet, Birsky District, Bashkortostan, Russia. The population was 12 as of 2010. There are 2 streets.

== Geography ==
Yangitau is located 10 km north of Birsk (the district's administrative centre) by road. Bazhenovo is the nearest rural locality.
