= Argysh =

Argysh Аргыш
- Village
- Location within Bashkortostan Location within Russia
- Coordinates: 55°43′N 54°50′E
- Country: Russia
- Region: Bashkortostan
- District: Dyurtyulinsky District
- Time zone: UTC+5:00

Argysh (Russian: Аргыш; Bashkir: Арғыш, Arğış) is a rural locality (a village) in Cherlakovsky Selsoviet, Dyurtyulinsky District, Bashkortostan, Russia. The population was 112 as of 2010. There are 2 streets.

== Geography ==
Argysh is located 61 km north of Dyurtyuli (the district's administrative centre) by road. Novoshilikovo is the nearest rural locality.
