= Lezhebokovo =

Lezhebokovo Лежебоково
- Selo
- Location within Bashkortostan Location within Russia
- Coordinates: 55°21′N 55°51′E
- Country: Russia
- Region: Bashkortostan
- District: Birsky District
- Time zone: UTC+5:00

Lezhebokovo (Russian: Лежебоково) is a rural locality (a selo) in Osinovsky Selsoviet, Birsky District, Bashkortostan, Russia. The population was 22 as of 2010. There are 2 streets.

== Geography ==
Lezhebokovo is located 24 km southeast of Birsk (the district's administrative centre) by road. Yemashevo is the nearest rural locality.
