= Mayadykovo =

Mayadykovo Маядыково
- Selo
- Location within Bashkortostan Location within Russia
- Coordinates: 55°14′N 55°13′E
- Country: Russia
- Region: Bashkortostan
- District: Birsky District
- Time zone: UTC+5:00

Mayadykovo (Russian: Маядыково; Bashkir: Миәҙек, Miäźek) is a rural locality (a selo) and the administrative centre of Mayadykovsky Selsoviet, Birsky District, Bashkortostan, Russia. The population was 252 as of 2010. There are 5 streets.

== Geography ==
Mayadykovo is located 36 km southwest of Birsk (the district's administrative centre) by road. Shelkanovo is the nearest rural locality.
