= Takarlikovo =

Takarlikovo Такарликово
- Selo
- Location within Bashkortostan Location within Russia
- Coordinates: 55°27′N 54°47′E
- Country: Russia
- Region: Bashkortostan
- District: Dyurtyulinsky District
- Time zone: UTC+5:00

Takarlikovo (Russian: Такарликово; Bashkir: Тәкәрлек, Täkärlek) is a rural locality (a selo) in Takarlikovsky Selsoviet, Dyurtyulinsky District, Bashkortostan, Russia. The population was 255 as of 2010. There are 6 streets.

== Geography ==
Takarlikovo is located 8 km southwest of Dyurtyuli (the district's administrative centre) by road. Gublyukuchukovo is the nearest rural locality.

== Notable people ==
- The amateur scientist Anton Valeriyovich Maximov (1956-2001) died in Takarlikovo.
