= Vyazovsky =

Vyazovsky Вязовский
- Village
- Location within Bashkortostan Location within Russia
- Coordinates: 55°30′N 55°35′E
- Country: Russia
- Region: Bashkortostan
- District: Birsky District
- Time zone: UTC+5:00

Vyazovsky (Russian: Вязовский) is a rural locality (a village) in Bakhtybayevsky Selsoviet, Birsky District, Bashkortostan, Russia. The population was 144 as of 2010. There are 5 streets.

== Geography ==
Vyazovsky is located 15 km north of Birsk (the district's administrative centre) by road. Bazhenovo is the nearest rural locality.
