= Yusupovo =

Yusupovo Юсупово
- Selo
- Location within Bashkortostan Location within Russia
- Coordinates: 55°42′N 54°39′E
- Country: Russia
- Region: Bashkortostan
- District: Dyurtyulinsky District
- Time zone: UTC+5:00

Yusupovo (Russian: Юсупово; Bashkir: Йосоп, Yosop) is a rural locality (a selo) in Cherlakovsky Selsoviet, Dyurtyulinsky District, Bashkortostan, Russia. The population was 668 as of 2010. There are 9 streets.

== Geography ==
Yusupovo is located 35 km northwest of Dyurtyuli (the district's administrative centre) by road. Novy Burtyuk is the nearest rural locality.
