= Minishty =

Minishty Миништы
- Selo
- Location within Bashkortostan Location within Russia
- Coordinates: 55°37′N 55°01′E
- Country: Russia
- Region: Bashkortostan
- District: Dyurtyulinsky District
- Time zone: UTC+5:00

Minishty (Russian: Миништы; Bashkir: Миңеште, Miñeşte) is a rural locality (a selo) in Mayadykovsky Selsoviet, Dyurtyulinsky District, Bashkortostan, Russia. The population was 561 as of 2010. There are 12 streets.

== Geography ==
Minishty is located 33 km northeast of Dyurtyuli (the district's administrative centre) by road. Bargyzbash is the nearest rural locality.
