= Penkovo =

Penkovo Пеньково
- Selo
- Location within Bashkortostan Location within Russia
- Coordinates: 55°20′N 55°17′E
- Country: Russia
- Region: Bashkortostan
- District: Birsky District
- Time zone: UTC+5:00

Penkovo (Russian: Пеньково) is a rural locality (a selo) in Kusekeyevsky Selsoviet, Birsky District, Bashkortostan, Russia. The population was 157 as of 2010. There are 5 streets.

== Geography ==
Penkovo is located 20 km southwest of Birsk (the district's administrative centre) by road. Akudibashevo is the nearest rural locality.
