= Zuyevo, Republic of Bashkortostan =

Zuyevo Зуево
- Village
- Location within Bashkortostan Location within Russia
- Coordinates: 55°15′N 55°49′E
- Country: Russia
- Region: Bashkortostan
- District: Birsky District
- Time zone: UTC+5:00

Zuyevo (Russian: Зуево) is a rural locality (a village) in Kalinnikovsky Selsoviet, Birsky District, Bashkortostan, Russia. The population was 80 as of 2010. There are 3 streets.

== Geography ==
Zuyevo is located 35 km southeast of Birsk (the district's administrative centre) by road. Sorvikha is the nearest rural locality.
