= Novodesyatkino =

Novodesyatkino Новодесяткино
- Village
- Location within Bashkortostan Location within Russia
- Coordinates: 55°21′N 55°19′E
- Country: Russia
- Region: Bashkortostan
- District: Birsky District
- Time zone: UTC+5:00

Novodesyatkino (Russian: Новодесяткино) is a rural locality (a village) in Kusekeyevsky Selsoviet, Birsky District, Bashkortostan, Russia. The population was 55 as of 2010. There is 1 street.

== Geography ==
Novodesyatkino is located 17 km southwest of Birsk (the district's administrative centre) by road. Penkovo is the nearest rural locality.
