= Pityakovo =

Pityakovo Питяково
- Selo
- Location within Bashkortostan Location within Russia
- Coordinates: 55°14′N 55°30′E
- Country: Russia
- Region: Bashkortostan
- District: Birsky District
- Time zone: UTC+5:00

Pityakovo (Russian: Питяково) is a rural locality (a selo) and the administrative centre of Staropetrovsky Selsoviet, Birsky District, Bashkortostan, Russia. The population was 615 as of 2010. There are 11 streets.

== Geography ==
Pityakovo is located 22 km south of Birsk (the district's administrative centre) by road. Staropetrovo is the nearest rural locality.
