= Simkino =

Simkino Симкино
- Selo
- Location within Bashkortostan Location within Russia
- Coordinates: 55°14′N 55°38′E
- Country: Russia
- Region: Bashkortostan
- District: Birsky District
- Time zone: UTC+5:00

Simkino (Russian: Симкино; Bashkir: Симкә, Simkä) is a rural locality (a selo) in Staropetrovsky Selsoviet, Birsky District, Bashkortostan, Russia. The population was 27 as of 2010. There are 3 streets.

== Geography ==
Simkino is located 27 km southeast of Birsk (the district's administrative centre) by road. Staropetrovo is the nearest rural locality.
