= Starobaltachevo =

Starobaltachevo (Russian: Старобалтачево) is the name of two rural localities in the Republic of Bashkortostan, Russia:

- Starobaltachevo, Baltachevsky District, Republic of Bashkortostan, a selo in Baltachevsky District
- Starobaltachevo, Dyurtyulinsky District, Republic of Bashkortostan, a village in Dyurtyulinsky District
