= Iskush =

Iskush Искуш
- Selo
- Location within Bashkortostan Location within Russia
- Coordinates: 55°38′N 54°54′E
- Country: Russia
- Region: Bashkortostan
- District: Dyurtyulinsky District
- Time zone: UTC+5:00

Iskush (Russian: Искуш; Bashkir: Исҡуш, İsquş) is a rural locality (a selo) in Mayadykovsky Selsoviet, Dyurtyulinsky District, Bashkortostan, Russia. The population was 8 as of 2010. There are 4 streets.

== Geography ==
Iskush is located 32 km north of Dyurtyuli (the district's administrative centre) by road. Uyady is the nearest rural locality.
