= Staroyezhovo =

Staroyezhovo Староежово
- Village
- Location within Bashkortostan Location within Russia
- Coordinates: 55°12′N 55°18′E
- Country: Russia
- Region: Bashkortostan
- District: Birsky District
- Time zone: UTC+5:00

Staroyezhovo (Russian: Староежово) is a rural locality (a village) in Berezovsky Selsoviet, Birsky District, Bashkortostan, Russia. The population was 89 as of 2010. There are 9 streets.

== Geography ==
Staroyezhovo is located 37 km southwest of Birsk (the district's administrative centre) by road. Pechenkino is the nearest rural locality.
