= Akkainovo =

Akkainovo Аккаиново
- Village
- Location within Bashkortostan Location within Russia
- Coordinates: 55°16′N 55°08′E
- Country: Russia
- Region: Bashkortostan
- District: Birsky District
- Time zone: UTC+5:00

Akkainovo (Russian: Аккаиново; Bashkir: Аҡҡайын, Aqqayın) is a rural locality (a village) in Mayadykovsky Selsoviet, Birsky District, Bashkortostan, Russia. The population was 53 as of 2010. There is 1 street.

== Geography ==
Akkainovo is located 34 km southwest of Birsk (the district's administrative centre) by road. Shelkanovo is the nearest rural locality.
