= Starobaishevo =

Starobaishevo Старобаишево
- Selo
- Location within Bashkortostan Location within Russia
- Coordinates: 55°25′N 55°07′E
- Country: Russia
- Region: Bashkortostan
- District: Dyurtyulinsky District
- Time zone: UTC+5:00

Starobaishevo (Russian: Старобаишево; Bashkir: Иҫке Байыш, İśke Bayış) is a rural locality (a selo) and the administrative centre of Starobaishevsky Selsoviet, Dyurtyulinsky District, Bashkortostan, Russia. The population was 631 as of 2010. There are 8 streets.

== Geography ==
Starobaishevo is located 21 km southeast of Dyurtyuli (the district's administrative centre) by road. Akaneyevo is the nearest rural locality.
