= Starobiktimirovo =

Starobiktimirovo Старобиктимирово
- Village
- Location within Bashkortostan Location within Russia
- Coordinates: 55°11′N 55°32′E
- Country: Russia
- Region: Bashkortostan
- District: Birsky District
- Time zone: UTC+5:00

Starobiktimirovo (Russian: Старобиктимирово; Bashkir: Иҫке Биктимер, İśke Biktimer) is a rural locality (a village) in Staropetrovsky Selsoviet, Birsky District, Bashkortostan, Russia. The population was 5 as of 2010. There is 1 street.

== Geography ==
Starobiktimirovo is located 28 km south of Birsk (the district's administrative centre) by road. Novobiktimirovo is the nearest rural locality.
