= Sikalikul =

Sikalikul Сикаликуль
- Village
- Location within Bashkortostan Location within Russia
- Coordinates: 55°31′N 54°30′E
- Country: Russia
- Region: Bashkortostan
- District: Dyurtyulinsky District
- Time zone: UTC+5:00

Sikalikul (Russian: Сикаликуль; Bashkir: Һикәлекүл, Hikälekül) is a rural locality (a village) in Ismailovsky Selsoviet, Dyurtyulinsky District, Bashkortostan, Russia. The population was 170 as of 2010. There is 1 street.

== Geography ==
Sikalikul is located 27 km northwest of Dyurtyuli (the district's administrative centre) by road. Telepanovo is the nearest rural locality.
