= Novobiktovo =

Novobiktovo Новобиктово
- Selo
- Location within Bashkortostan Location within Russia
- Coordinates: 55°33′N 54°50′E
- Country: Russia
- Region: Bashkortostan
- District: Dyurtyulinsky District
- Time zone: UTC+5:00

Novobiktovo (Russian: Новобиктово; Bashkir: Яңы Бейектау, Yañı Beyektaw) is a rural locality (a selo) in Takarlikovsky Selsoviet, Dyurtyulinsky District, Bashkortostan, Russia. The population was 553 as of 2010. There are 12 streets.

== Geography ==
Novobiktovo is located 11 km north of Dyurtyuli (the district's administrative centre) by road. Veyalochnaya is the nearest rural locality.
