= Taymurzino =

Taymurzino Таймурзино
- Selo
- Location within Bashkortostan Location within Russia
- Coordinates: 55°22′N 54°50′E
- Country: Russia
- Region: Bashkortostan
- District: Dyurtyulinsky District
- Time zone: UTC+5:00

Taymurzino (Russian: Таймурзино; Bashkir: Таймырҙа, Taymırźa) is a rural locality (a selo) and the administrative centre of Taymurzinsky Selsoviet, Dyurtyulinsky District, Bashkortostan, Russia. The population was 661 as of 2010. There are nine streets.

== Geography ==
Taymurzino is located 17 km southwest of Dyurtyuli (the district's administrative centre) by road. Sultanbekovo is the nearest rural locality.
