= Zeylevo =

Zeylevo Зейлево
- Village
- Location within Bashkortostan Location within Russia
- Coordinates: 55°27′N 55°02′E
- Country: Russia
- Region: Bashkortostan
- District: Dyurtyulinsky District
- Time zone: UTC+5:00

Zeylevo (Russian: Зейлево; Bashkir: Йәйләү, Yäyläw) is a rural locality (a village) in Uchpilinsky Selsoviet, Dyurtyulinsky District, Bashkortostan, Russia. The population was 176 as of 2010. There are 4 streets.

== Geography ==
Zeylevo is located 15 km southeast of Dyurtyuli (the district's administrative centre) by road. Uchpili is the nearest rural locality.
