= Karalachuk =

Karalachuk Каралачук
- Selo
- Location within Bashkortostan Location within Russia
- Coordinates: 55°24′N 54°39′E
- Country: Russia
- Region: Bashkortostan
- District: Dyurtyulinsky District
- Time zone: UTC+5:00

Karalachuk (Russian: Каралачук; Bashkir: Ҡораласыҡ, Qoralasıq) is a rural locality (a selo) in Semiletovsky Selsoviet, Dyurtyulinsky District, Bashkortostan, Russia. The population was 528 as of 2010. There are 7 streets.

== Geography ==
Karalachuk is located 21 km southwest of Dyurtyuli (the district's administrative centre) by road. Nizhnemancharovo is the nearest rural locality.
