= Kuzovo =

Kuzovo Кузово
- Selo
- Location within Bashkortostan Location within Russia
- Coordinates: 55°21′N 55°11′E
- Country: Russia
- Region: Bashkortostan
- District: Birsky District
- Time zone: UTC+5:00

Kuzovo (Russian: Кузово; Bashkir: Ҡуҙы, Quźı) is a rural locality (a selo) in Chishminsky Selsoviet, Birsky District, Bashkortostan, Russia. The population was 444 as of 2010. There are 6 streets.

== Geography ==
Kuzovo is located 30 km southwest of Birsk (the district's administrative centre) by road. Aygildino is the nearest rural locality.
