= Novobiktimirovo =

Novobiktimirovo Новобиктимирово
- Village
- Location within Bashkortostan Location within Russia
- Coordinates: 55°11′N 55°32′E
- Country: Russia
- Region: Bashkortostan
- District: Birsky District
- Time zone: UTC+5:00

Novobiktimirovo (Russian: Новобиктимирово; Bashkir: Яңы Биктимер, Yañı Biktimer) is a rural locality (a village) in Staropetrovsky Selsoviet, Birsky District, Bashkortostan, Russia. The population was 34 as of 2010. There is one street.

== Geography ==
Novobiktimirovo is located 29 km south of Birsk (the district's administrative centre) by road. Starobiktimirovo is the nearest rural locality.
