= Veyalochnaya =

Veyalochnaya Веялочная
- Village
- Location within Bashkortostan Location within Russia
- Coordinates: 55°35′N 54°47′E
- Country: Russia
- Region: Bashkortostan
- District: Dyurtyulinsky District
- Time zone: UTC+5:00

Veyalochnaya (Russian: Веялочная; Bashkir: Елгәргестәр, Yelgärgestär) is a rural locality (a village) in Angasyakovsky Selsoviet, Dyurtyulinsky District, Bashkortostan, Russia. The population was 189 as of 2010. There are 7 streets.

== Geography ==
Veyalochnaya is located 16 km north of Dyurtyuli (the district's administrative centre) by road. Novobiktovo is the nearest rural locality.
