= Srednebazanovo =

Srednebazanovo Среднебазаново
- Village
- Location within Bashkortostan Location within Russia
- Coordinates: 55°18′N 55°18′E
- Country: Russia
- Region: Bashkortostan
- District: Birsky District
- Time zone: UTC+5:00

Srednebazanovo (Russian: Среднебазаново; Bashkir: Урта Баҙан, Urta Baźan) is a rural locality (a village) in Starobazanovsky Selsoviet, Birsky District, Bashkortostan, Russia. The population was 90 as of 2010. There are 2 streets.

== Geography ==
Srednebazanovo is located 24 km southwest of Birsk (the district's administrative centre) by road. Akudi and Starobazanovo are the nearest rural localities.
