= Eldyak =

Eldyak Ельдяк
- Village
- Location within Bashkortostan Location within Russia
- Coordinates: 55°29′N 55°10′E
- Country: Russia
- Region: Bashkortostan
- District: Dyurtyulinsky District
- Time zone: UTC+5:00

Eldyak (Russian: Ельдяк; Bashkir: Йәлдәк, Yäldäk) is a rural locality (a village) in Staroyantuzovsky Selsoviet, Dyurtyulinsky District, Bashkortostan, Russia. The population was 46 as of 2010. There are 2 streets.

== Geography ==
Eldyak is located 30 km east of Dyurtyuli (the district's administrative centre) by road. Turbek is the nearest rural locality.
