= Kandakovka =

Kandakovka Кандаковка
- Village
- Location within Bashkortostan Location within Russia
- Coordinates: 55°23′N 55°27′E
- Country: Russia
- Region: Bashkortostan
- District: Birsky District
- Time zone: UTC+5:00

Kandakovka (Russian: Кандаковка) is a rural locality (a village) in Kusekeyevsky Selsoviet, Birsky District, Bashkortostan, Russia. The population was 324 as of 2010. There are 5 streets.

== Geography ==
Kandakovka is located 7 km southwest of Birsk (the district's administrative centre) by road. Shamsutdin is the nearest rural locality.
