= Aygildino =

Aygildino Айгильдино
- Village
- Location within Bashkortostan Location within Russia
- Coordinates: 55°22′N 55°11′E
- Country: Russia
- Region: Bashkortostan
- District: Birsky District
- Time zone: UTC+5:00

Aygildino (Russian: Айгильдино; Bashkir: Айгилде, Aygilde) is a rural locality (a village) in Chishminsky Selsoviet, Birsky District, Bashkortostan, Russia. The population was 109 as of 2010. There are three streets.

== Geography ==
Aygildino is located 32 kilometres (20 mi) southwest of Birsk (the district's administrative centre) by road. Pioner is the nearest rural locality.
