= Kuchergich =

Kuchergich Кучергич
- Village
- Location within Bashkortostan Location within Russia
- Coordinates: 55°34′N 54°39′E
- Country: Russia
- Region: Bashkortostan
- District: Dyurtyulinsky District
- Time zone: UTC+5:00

Kuchergich (Russian: Кучергич; Bashkir: Күсергес, Küserges) is a rural locality (a village) in Ismailovsky Selsoviet, Dyurtyulinsky District, Bashkortostan, Russia. The population was 67 as of 2010. There is 1 street.

== Geography ==
Kuchergich is located 20 km northwest of Dyurtyuli (the district's administrative centre) by road. Ismailovo is the nearest rural locality.
