= Sabanayevo, Dyurtyulinsky District, Republic of Bashkortostan =

Sabanayevo Сабанаево
- Village
- Location within Bashkortostan Location within Russia
- Coordinates: 55°28′N 55°10′E
- Country: Russia
- Region: Bashkortostan
- District: Dyurtyulinsky District
- Time zone: UTC+5:00

Sabanayevo (Russian: Сабанаево; Bashkir: Һабанай, Habanay) is a rural locality (a village) in Staroyantuzovsky Selsoviet, Dyurtyulinsky District, Bashkortostan, Russia. The population was 155 as of 2010. There are 3 streets.

== Geography ==
Sabanayevo is located 27 km east of Dyurtyuli (the district's administrative centre) by road. Turbek is the nearest rural locality.
