= Bishnarat =

Bishnarat Бишнарат
- Village
- Location within Bashkortostan Location within Russia
- Coordinates: 55°26′N 55°11′E
- Country: Russia
- Region: Bashkortostan
- District: Dyurtyulinsky District
- Time zone: UTC+5:00

Bishnarat (Russian: Бишнарат; Bashkir: Бишнарат, Bişnarat) is a rural locality (a village) in Staroyantuzovsky Selsoviet, Dyurtyulinsky District, Bashkortostan, Russia. The population was 15 in 2010. There is one street.

== Geography ==
Bishnarat is located 29 km southeast of Dyurtyuli (the district's administrative centre) by road. Novoishmetovo is the nearest rural locality.
