= Uzhara =

Uzhara Ужара
- Village
- Location within Bashkortostan Location within Russia
- Coordinates: 55°17′N 55°11′E
- Country: Russia
- Region: Bashkortostan
- District: Birsky District
- Time zone: UTC+5:00

Uzhara (Russian: Ужара; Bashkir: Ужара, Ujara) is a rural locality (a village) in Mayadykovsky Selsoviet, Birsky District, Bashkortostan, Russia. The population was 69 as of 2010. There is 1 street.

== Geography ==
Uzhara is located 29 km southwest of Birsk (the district's administrative centre) by road. Shelkanovo is the nearest rural locality.
