= Kalinniki =

Kalinniki Калинники
- Selo
- Location within Bashkortostan Location within Russia
- Coordinates: 55°14′N 55°45′E
- Country: Russia
- Region: Bashkortostan
- District: Birsky District
- Time zone: UTC+5:00

Kalinniki (Russian: Калинники) is a rural locality (a selo) and the administrative centre of Kalinnikovsky Selsoviet, Birsky District, Bashkortostan, Russia. The population was 1,005 as of 2010. There are 17 streets.

== Geography ==
Kalinniki is located 30 km southeast of Birsk (the district's administrative centre) by road. Zuyevo is the nearest rural locality.
