= Akudi =

Akudi Акуди
- Selo
- Location within Bashkortostan Location within Russia
- Coordinates: 55°19′N 55°17′E
- Country: Russia
- Region: Bashkortostan
- District: Birsky District
- Time zone: UTC+5:00

Akudi (Bashkir and Russian: Акуди) is a rural locality (a selo) in Starobazanovsky Selsoviet, Birsky District, Bashkortostan, Russia. The population was 467 as of 2010. There are 6 streets.

== Geography ==
Akudi is located 22 km southwest of Birsk (the district's administrative centre) by road. Srednebazanovo is the nearest rural locality.
