= Novoburnovo =

Novoburnovo Новобурново
- Village
- Location within Bashkortostan Location within Russia
- Coordinates: 55°27′N 55°38′E
- Country: Russia
- Region: Bashkortostan
- District: Birsky District
- Time zone: UTC+5:00

Novoburnovo (Russian: Новобурново; Bashkir: Яңы Бурны, Yañı Burnı) is a rural locality (a village) in Burnovsky Selsoviet, Birsky District, Bashkortostan, Russia. The population was 101 as of 2010. There are 3 streets.

== Geography ==
Novoburnovo is located 9 km northeast of Birsk (the district's administrative centre) by road. Staroburnovo is the nearest rural locality.
