= Turbek, Republic of Bashkortostan =

Turbek Турбек
- Village
- Location within Bashkortostan Location within Russia
- Coordinates: 55°28′N 55°11′E
- Country: Russia
- Region: Bashkortostan
- District: Dyurtyulinsky District
- Time zone: UTC+5:00

Turbek (Russian: Турбек; Bashkir: Түрбейек, Türbeyek) is a rural locality (a village) in Staroyantuzovsky Selsoviet, Dyurtyulinsky District, Bashkortostan, Russia. The population was 187 as of 2010. There are 5 streets.

== Geography ==
Turbek is located 28 km east of Dyurtyuli (the district's administrative centre) by road. Sabanayevo is the nearest rural locality.
