= Zitembyak =

Zitembyak Зитембяк
- Village
- Location within Bashkortostan Location within Russia
- Coordinates: 55°33′N 54°33′E
- Country: Russia
- Region: Bashkortostan
- District: Dyurtyulinsky District
- Time zone: UTC+5:00

Zitembyak (Russian: Зитембяк; Bashkir: Етембәк, Yetembäk) is a rural locality (a village) in Ismailovsky Selsoviet, Dyurtyulinsky District, Bashkortostan, Russia. The population was 195 as of 2010. There are 2 streets.

== Geography ==
Zitembyak is located 22 km northwest of Dyurtyuli (the district's administrative centre) by road. Chishma is the nearest rural locality.
