= Urnyak, Birsky District, Republic of Bashkortostan =

Urnyak Урняк
- Village
- Location within Bashkortostan Location within Russia
- Coordinates: 55°16′N 55°06′E
- Country: Russia
- Region: Bashkortostan
- District: Birsky District
- Time zone: UTC+5:00

Urnyak (Russian: Урняк; Bashkir: Үрнәк, Ürnäk) is a rural locality (a village) in Mayadykovsky Selsoviet, Birsky District, Bashkortostan, Russia. The population was 19 as of 2010. There is 1 street.

== Geography ==
Urnyak is located 34 km southwest of Birsk (the district's administrative centre) by road. Akkainovo is the nearest rural locality.
