= Uleyevo =

Uleyevo Улеево
- Selo
- Location within Bashkortostan Location within Russia
- Coordinates: 55°30′N 55°30′E
- Country: Russia
- Region: Bashkortostan
- District: Birsky District
- Time zone: UTC+5:00

Uleyevo (Russian: Улеево; Bashkir: Үләй, Üläy) is a rural locality (a selo) in Bakhtybayevsky Selsoviet, Birsky District, Bashkortostan, Russia. The population was 101 as of 2010. There are 6 streets.

== Geography ==
Uleyevo is located 20 km north of Birsk (the district's administrative centre) by road. Samosadka is the nearest rural locality.
