= Ismailovo =

Ismailovo Исмаилово
- Selo
- Location within Bashkortostan Location within Russia
- Coordinates: 55°33′N 54°37′E
- Country: Russia
- Region: Bashkortostan
- District: Dyurtyulinsky District
- Time zone: UTC+5:00

Ismailovo (Russian: Исмаилово; Bashkir: Исмаил, İsmail) is a rural locality (a selo) and the administrative centre of Ismailovsky Selsoviet, Dyurtyulinsky District, Bashkortostan, Russia. The population was 1,081 as of 2010. There are 20 streets.

== Geography ==
Ismailovo is located 18 km northwest of Dyurtyuli (the district's administrative centre) by road. Kuchergich is the nearest rural locality.
