= Tash-Yelga =

Tash-Yelga Таш-Елга
- Village
- Location within Bashkortostan Location within Russia
- Coordinates: 55°33′N 54°56′E
- Country: Russia
- Region: Bashkortostan
- District: Dyurtyulinsky District
- Time zone: UTC+5:00

Tash-Yelga (Russian: Таш-Елга; Bashkir: Ташйылға, Taşyılğa) is a rural locality (a village) in Mayadykovsky Selsoviet, Dyurtyulinsky District, Bashkortostan, Russia. The population was 202 as of 2010. There is 1 street.

== Geography ==
Tash-Yelga is located 21 km northeast of Dyurtyuli (the district's administrative centre) by road. Burny Potok is the nearest rural locality.
