= Kaishevo =

Kaishevo Каишево
- Village
- Location within Bashkortostan Location within Russia
- Coordinates: 55°27′N 55°05′E
- Country: Russia
- Region: Bashkortostan
- District: Dyurtyulinsky District
- Time zone: UTC+5:00

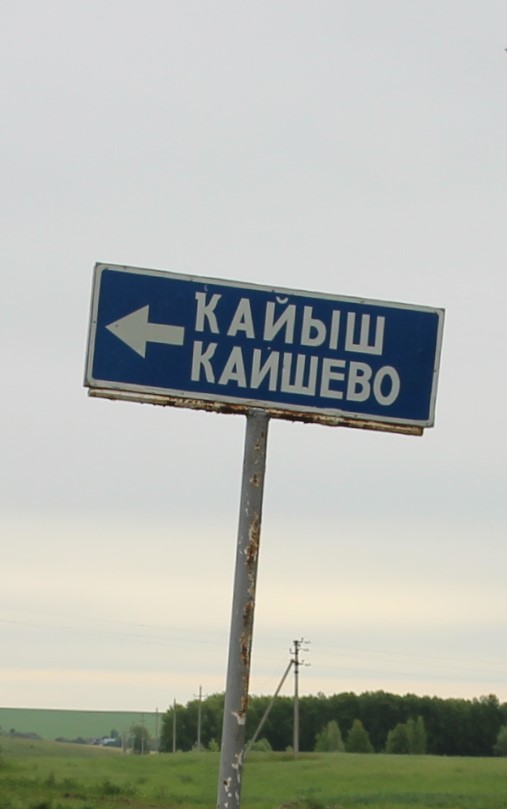

Kaishevo (Russian: Каишево; Bashkir: Ҡайыш, Qayış) is a rural locality (a village) in Staroyantuzovsky Selsoviet, Dyurtyulinsky District, Bashkortostan, Russia. The population was 197 as of 2010. There are 5 streets.

== Geography ==
Kaishevo is located 20 km southeast of Dyurtyuli (the district's administrative centre) by road. Staroyantuzovo is the nearest rural locality.
