= Kostarevo =

Kostarevo Костарево
- Selo
- Location within Bashkortostan Location within Russia
- Coordinates: 55°19′N 55°26′E
- Country: Russia
- Region: Bashkortostan
- District: Birsky District
- Time zone: UTC+5:00

Kostarevo (Russian: Костарево) is a rural locality (a selo) in Silantyevsky Selsoviet, Birsky District, Bashkortostan, Russia. The population was 210 as of 2010. There are 6 streets.

== Geography ==
Kostarevo is located 18 km southwest of Birsk (the district's administrative centre) by road. Kamyshinka is the nearest rural locality.
