= Pioner, Birsky District, Republic of Bashkortostan =

Pioner Пионер
- Village
- Location within Bashkortostan Location within Russia
- Coordinates: 55°22′N 55°10′E
- Country: Russia
- Region: Bashkortostan
- District: Birsky District
- Time zone: UTC+5:00

Pioner (Russian: Пионер) is a rural locality (a village) in Chishminsky Selsoviet, Birsky District, Bashkortostan, Russia. The population was 52 as of 2010. There is one street.

== Geography ==
Pioner is located 32 kilometres (20 mi) west of Birsk (the district's administrative centre) by road. Aygildino is the nearest rural locality.
