= Utkineyevo =

Utkineyevo Уткинеево
- Village
- Location within Bashkortostan Location within Russia
- Coordinates: 55°25′N 54°57′E
- Country: Russia
- Region: Bashkortostan
- District: Dyurtyulinsky District
- Time zone: UTC+5:00

Utkineyevo (Russian: Уткинеево; Bashkir: Үткен, Ütken) is a rural locality (a village) in Sukkulovsky Selsoviet, Dyurtyulinsky District, Bashkortostan, Russia. The population was 143 as of 2010. There are 4 streets.

== Geography ==
Utkineyevo is located 13 km southeast of Dyurtyuli (the district's administrative centre) by road. Mamadalevo is the nearest rural locality.
