= Staroburnovo =

Staroburnovo Старобурново
- Selo
- Location within Bashkortostan Location within Russia
- Coordinates: 55°26′N 55°37′E
- Country: Russia
- Region: Bashkortostan
- District: Birsky District
- Time zone: UTC+5:00

Staroburnovo (Russian: Старобурново; Bashkir: Иҫке Бурны, İśke Burnı) is a rural locality (a selo) and the administrative centre of Burnovsky Selsoviet, Birsky District, Bashkortostan, Russia. The population was 862 as of 2010. There are 12 streets.

== Geography ==
Staroburnovo is located 7 km northeast of Birsk (the district's administrative centre) by road. Novoburnovo is the nearest rural locality.
