= Semiletka =

Semiletka Семилетка
- Selo
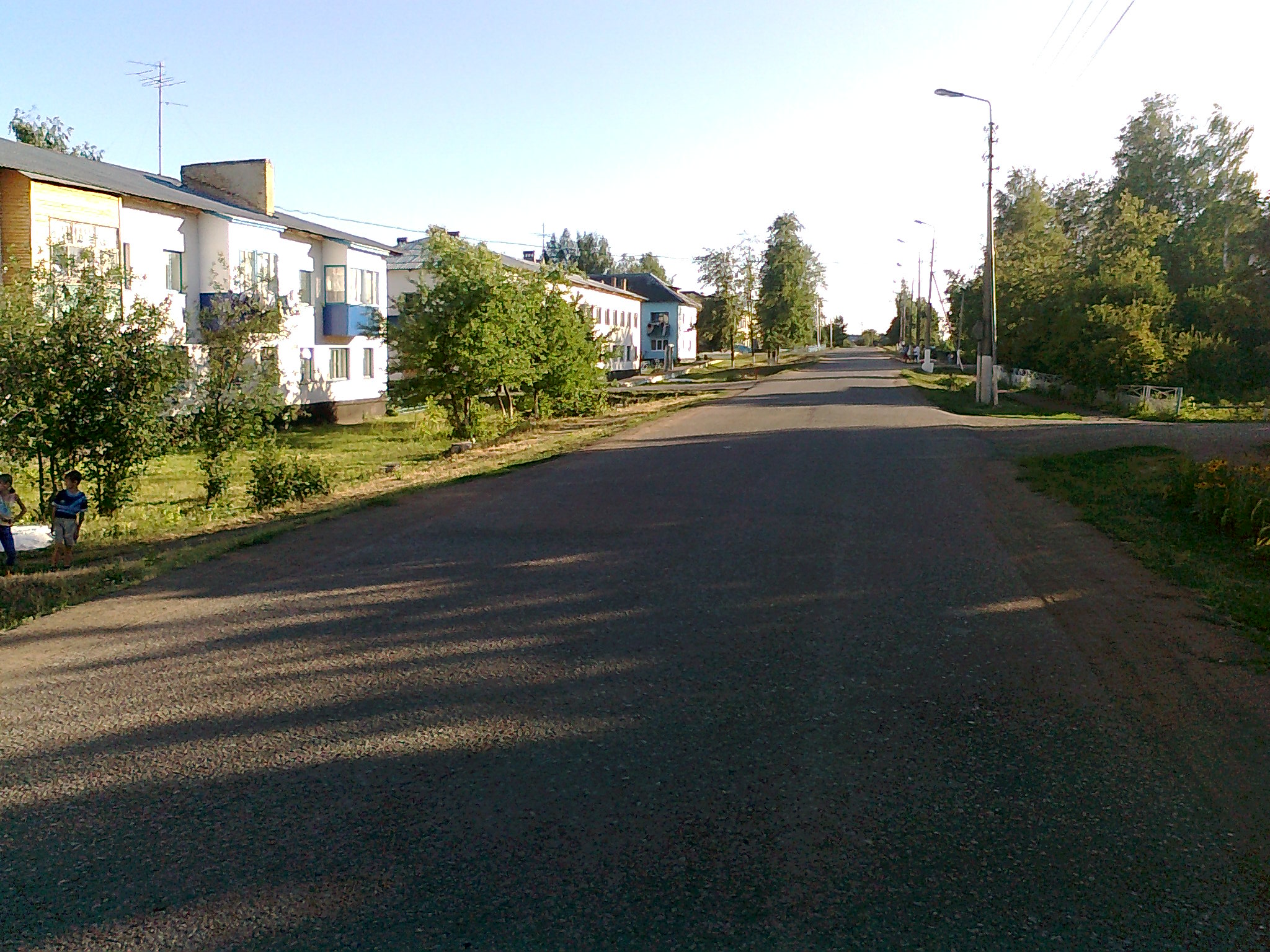

- Location within Bashkortostan Location within Russia
- Coordinates: 55°21′N 54°36′E
- Country: Russia
- Region: Bashkortostan
- District: Dyurtyulinsky District
- Time zone: UTC+5:00

Semiletka (Russian: Семилетка) is a rural locality (a selo) and the administrative centre of Semiletovsky Selsoviet, Dyurtyulinsky District, Bashkortostan, Russia. The population was 3,977 as of 2010. There are 20 streets.

== Geography ==
Semiletka is located 29 km southwest of Dyurtyuli (the district's administrative centre) by road. Verkhnemancharovo is the nearest rural locality.
