= Mordvinovka =

Mordvinovka Мордвиновка
- Village
- Location within Bashkortostan Location within Russia
- Coordinates: 55°17′N 55°28′E
- Country: Russia
- Region: Bashkortostan
- District: Birsky District
- Time zone: UTC+5:00

Mordvinovka (Russian: Мордвиновка) is a rural locality (a village) in Silantyevsky Selsoviet, Birsky District, Bashkortostan, Russia. The population was 20 as of 2010. There is 1 street.

== Geography ==
Mordvinovka is located 19 km south of Birsk (the district's administrative centre) by road. Kamyshinka is the nearest rural locality.
