= Kazaklarovo =

Kazaklarovo Казакларово
- Selo
- Location within Bashkortostan Location within Russia
- Coordinates: 55°30′N 55°03′E
- Country: Russia
- Region: Bashkortostan
- District: Dyurtyulinsky District
- Time zone: UTC+5:00

Kazaklarovo (Russian: Казакларово; Bashkir: Ҡаҙаҡлар, Qaźaqlar) is a rural locality (a selo) in Uchpilinsky Selsoviet, Dyurtyulinsky District, Bashkortostan, Russia. The population was 223 as of 2010. There are 4 streets.

== Geography ==
Kazaklarovo is located 18 km northeast of Dyurtyuli (the district's administrative centre) by road. Staroyantuzovo is the nearest rural locality.
