= Starobazanovo =

Starobazanovo Старобазаново
- Selo
- Location within Bashkortostan Location within Russia
- Coordinates: 55°18′N 55°18′E
- Country: Russia
- Region: Bashkortostan
- District: Birsky District
- Time zone: UTC+5:00

Starobazanovo (Russian: Старобазаново; Bashkir: Иҫке Баҙан, İśke Baźan) is a rural locality (a selo) and the administrative centre of Starobazanovsky Selsoviet, Birsky District, Bashkortostan, Russia. The population was 11 as of 2010. There are 3 streets.

== Geography ==
Starobazanovo is located 24 km southwest of Birsk (the district's administrative centre) by road. Srednebazanovo is the nearest rural locality.
