= Ivanayevo =

Ivanayevo Иванаево
- Selo
- Location within Bashkortostan Location within Russia
- Coordinates: 55°29′N 54°49′E
- Country: Russia
- Region: Bashkortostan
- District: Dyurtyulinsky District
- Time zone: UTC+5:00

Ivanayevo (Russian: Иванаево; Bashkir: Иванай, İvanay) is a rural locality (a selo) and the administrative centre of Takarlikovsky Selsoviet, Dyurtyulinsky District, Bashkortostan, Russia. The population was 1,584 as of 2010. There are 27 streets.

== Geography ==
Ivanayevo is located 3 km northwest of Dyurtyuli (the district's administrative centre) by road. Dyurtyuli is the nearest rural locality.
