= Starourtayevo =

Starourtayevo Староуртаево
- Selo
- Location within Bashkortostan Location within Russia
- Coordinates: 55°24′N 55°08′E
- Country: Russia
- Region: Bashkortostan
- District: Dyurtyulinsky District
- Time zone: UTC+5:00

Starourtayevo (Russian: Староуртаево; Bashkir: Иҫке Уртай, İśke Urtay) is a rural locality (a selo) in Starobaishevsky Selsoviet, Dyurtyulinsky District, Bashkortostan, Russia. The population was 396 as of 2010. There are 7 streets.

As of 2002, 87% of the locality's population were the Bashkirs.

== Geography ==
Starourtayevo is located 26 km southeast of Dyurtyuli (the district's administrative centre) by road. Starobaishevo is the nearest rural locality.
