= Yuntiryak =

Yuntiryak Юнтиряк
- Village
- Location within Bashkortostan Location within Russia
- Coordinates: 55°30′N 54°44′E
- Country: Russia
- Region: Bashkortostan
- District: Dyurtyulinsky District
- Time zone: UTC+5:00

Yuntiryak (Russian: Юнтиряк; Bashkir: Йөнтирәк, Yöntiräk) is a rural locality (a village) in Takarlikovsky Selsoviet, Dyurtyulinsky District, Bashkortostan, Russia. In 2010, Yuntiryak had a population of 90. There are 3 streets.

== Geography ==
Yuntiryak is located 10 km northwest of Dyurtyuli (the district's administrative centre) by road. Kushulevo is the nearest rural locality.
