= Novobadrakovo =

Novobadrakovo Новобадраково
- Village
- Location within Bashkortostan Location within Russia
- Coordinates: 55°33′N 55°09′E
- Country: Russia
- Region: Bashkortostan
- District: Dyurtyulinsky District
- Time zone: UTC+5:00

Novobadrakovo (Russian: Новобадраково; Bashkir: Яңы Баҙраҡ, Yañı Baźraq) is a rural locality (a village) in Uchpilinsky Selsoviet, Dyurtyulinsky District, Bashkortostan, Russia. The population was 26 as of 2010. There is 1 street.

== Geography ==
Novobadrakovo is located 30 km (19 mi) northeast of Dyurtyuli (the district's administrative centre) by road. Taubash-Badrakovo is the nearest rural locality.
