= Starosultanbekovo =

Starosultanbekovo Старосултанбеково
- Selo
- Location within Bashkortostan Location within Russia
- Coordinates: 55°26′N 54°50′E
- Country: Russia
- Region: Bashkortostan
- District: Dyurtyulinsky District
- Time zone: UTC+5:00

Starosultanbekovo (Russian: Старосултанбеково; Bashkir: Иҫке Солтанбәк, İśke Soltanbäk) is a rural locality (a selo) in Takarlikovsky Selsoviet, Dyurtyulinsky District, Bashkortostan, Russia. The population was 576 as of 2010. There are 12 streets.

== Geography ==
Starosultanbekovo is located 5 km southwest of Dyurtyuli (the district's administrative centre) by road. Dyurtyuli is the nearest rural locality.
