= Nizhnemancharovo =

Nizhnemancharovo Нижнеманчарово
- Selo
- Location within Bashkortostan Location within Russia
- Coordinates: 55°23′N 54°37′E
- Country: Russia
- Region: Bashkortostan
- District: Dyurtyulinsky District
- Time zone: UTC+5:00

Nizhnemancharovo (Russian: Нижнеманчарово; Bashkir: Түбәнге Маншыр, Tübänge Manşır) is a rural locality (a selo) in Semiletovsky Selsoviet, Dyurtyulinsky District, Bashkortostan, Russia. The population was 549 as of 2010. There are 5 streets.

== Geography ==
Nizhnemancharovo is located 24 km southwest of Dyurtyuli (the district's administrative centre) by road. Karalachuk is the nearest rural locality.
