= Gulyukovo =

Gulyukovo Гулюково
- Village
- Location within Bashkortostan Location within Russia
- Coordinates: 55°23′N 55°05′E
- Country: Russia
- Region: Bashkortostan
- District: Dyurtyulinsky District
- Time zone: UTC+5:00

Gulyukovo (Russian: Гулюково; Bashkir: Гөлөк, Gölök) is a rural locality (a village) in Starobaishevsky Selsoviet, Dyurtyulinsky District, Bashkortostan, Russia. The population was 181 as of 2010. There is 1 street.

== Geography ==
Gulyukovo is located 22 km southeast of Dyurtyuli (the district's administrative centre) by road. Starourtayevo is the nearest rural locality.
