= Uguzevo =

Uguzevo Угузево
- Selo
- Location within Bashkortostan Location within Russia
- Coordinates: 55°16′21″N 55°41′17″E
- Country: Russia
- Region: Bashkortostan
- District: Birsky District

Population (2010)
  - Total: 414
- Time zone: UTC+5:00

Uguzevo (Russian: Угузево; Bashkir: Үгеҙ, Ügäź) is a rural locality (a selo) and the administrative centre of Uguzevsky Selsoviet, Birsky District, Bashkortostan, Russia. The population was 414 as of 2010. There are 8 streets.

== Geography ==
Uguzevo is located 25 km southeast of Birsk (the district's administrative centre) by road. Chishma is the nearest rural locality.
