= Imay-Utarovo =

Imay-Utarovo Имай-Утарово
- Selo
- Location within Bashkortostan Location within Russia
- Coordinates: 55°20′N 54°59′E
- Country: Russia
- Region: Bashkortostan
- District: Dyurtyulinsky District
- Time zone: UTC+5:00

Imay-Utarovo (Russian: Имай-Утарово; Bashkir: Имай-Утар, İmay-Utar) is a rural locality (a selo) in Moskovsky Selsoviet, Dyurtyulinsky District, Bashkortostan, Russia. The population was 325 as of 2010. There are 7 streets.

== Geography ==
Imay-Utarovo is located 31 km southeast of Dyurtyuli (the district's administrative centre) by road. Kukkuyanovo is the nearest rural locality.
