= Usakovo =

Usakovo Усаково
- Village
- Location within Bashkortostan Location within Russia
- Coordinates: 55°17′N 55°18′E
- Country: Russia
- Region: Bashkortostan
- District: Birsky District
- Time zone: UTC+5:00

Usakovo (Russian: Усаково; Bashkir: Уҫаҡ, Uśaq) is a rural locality (a village) in Starobazanovsky Selsoviet, Birsky District, Bashkortostan, Russia. The population was 223 as of 2010. There is 1 street.

== Geography ==
Usakovo is located 27 km southwest of Birsk (the district's administrative centre) by road. Starobazanovo is the nearest rural locality.
