= Startsino =

Startsino Старцино
- Selo
- Location within Bashkortostan Location within Russia
- Coordinates: 55°13′N 55°45′E
- Country: Russia
- Region: Bashkortostan
- District: Birsky District
- Time zone: UTC+5:00

Startsino (Russian: Старцино) is a rural locality (a selo) in Kalinnikovsky Selsoviet, Birsky District, Bashkortostan, Russia. The population was 263 as of 2010. There are 9 streets.

== Geography ==
Startsino is located 31 km southeast of Birsk (the district's administrative centre) by road. Kalinniki is the nearest rural locality.
