= Akaneyevo =

Akaneyevo Аканеево
- Selo
- Location within Bashkortostan Location within Russia
- Coordinates: 55°26′N 55°06′E
- Country: Russia
- Region: Bashkortostan
- District: Dyurtyulinsky District
- Time zone: UTC+5:00

Akaneyevo (Russian: Аканеево; Bashkir: Әкәнәй, Äkänäy) is a rural locality (a selo) in Staroyantuzovsky Selsoviet, Dyurtyulinsky District, Bashkortostan, Russia. The population was 283 as of 2010. There are 10 streets.

== Geography ==
Akaneyevo is located 22 km southeast of Dyurtyuli (the district's administrative centre) by road. Starobaishevo is the nearest rural locality.
