= Bargyzbash =

Bargyzbash Баргызбаш
- Village
- Location within Bashkortostan Location within Russia
- Coordinates: 55°38′N 54°57′E
- Country: Russia
- Region: Bashkortostan
- District: Dyurtyulinsky District
- Time zone: UTC+5:00

Bargyzbash (Russian: Баргызбаш; Bashkir: Барғыҙбаш, Barğıźbaş) is a rural locality (a village) in Mayadykovsky Selsoviet, Dyurtyulinsky District, Bashkortostan, Russia. The population was 51 as of 2010. There is 1 street.

== Geography ==
Bargyzbash is located 32 km north of Dyurtyuli (the district's administrative centre) by road. Mayadyk is the nearest rural locality.
