= Ivachevo =

Ivachevo Ивачево
- Selo
- Location within Bashkortostan Location within Russia
- Coordinates: 55°17′N 55°00′E
- Country: Russia
- Region: Bashkortostan
- District: Dyurtyulinsky District
- Time zone: UTC+5:00

Ivachevo (Russian: Ивачево) is a rural locality (a selo) in Kukkuyanovsky Selsoviet, Dyurtyulinsky District, Bashkortostan, Russia. The population was 541 as of 2010. There are 4 streets.

== Geography ==
Ivachevo is located 30 km south of Dyurtyuli (the district's administrative centre) by road. Saitovo is the nearest rural locality.
