= Bekmurzino =

Bekmurzino Бекмурзино
- Selo
- Location within Bashkortostan Location within Russia
- Coordinates: 55°13′N 55°34′E
- Country: Russia
- Region: Bashkortostan
- District: Birsky District
- Time zone: UTC+5:00

Bekmurzino (Russian: Бекмурзино; Bashkir: Бикмырҙа, Bikmırźa) is a rural locality (a selo) in Staropetrovsky Selsoviet, Birsky District, Bashkortostan, Russia. The population was 391 as of 2010. There are 5 streets.

== Geography ==
Bekmurzino is located 25 km south of Birsk (the district's administrative centre) by road. Novopetrovo is the nearest rural locality.
