= Taubash-Badrakovo =

Taubash-Badrakovo Таубаш-Бадраково
- Village
- Location within Bashkortostan Location within Russia
- Coordinates: 55°33′N 55°09′E
- Country: Russia
- Region: Bashkortostan
- District: Dyurtyulinsky District
- Time zone: UTC+5:00

Taubash-Badrakovo (Russian: Таубаш-Бадраково; Bashkir: Таубаш-Баҙраҡ, Tawbaş-Baźraq) is a rural locality (a village) in Uchpilinsky Selsoviet, Dyurtyulinsky District, Bashkortostan, Russia. The population was 142 as of 2010. There are 5 streets.

== Geography ==
Taubash-Badrakovo is located 30 km northeast of Dyurtyuli (the district's administrative centre) by road. Novobadrakovo is the nearest rural locality.
