= Novoishmetovo =

Novoishmetovo Новоишметово
- Village
- Location within Bashkortostan Location within Russia
- Coordinates: 55°27′N 55°10′E
- Country: Russia
- Region: Bashkortostan
- District: Dyurtyulinsky District
- Time zone: UTC+5:00

Novoishmetovo (Russian: Новоишметово; Bashkir: Яңы Ишмәт, Yañı İşmät) is a rural locality (a village) in Staroyantuzovsky Selsoviet, Dyurtyulinsky District, Bashkortostan, Russia. The population was 79 as of 2010. There are 4 streets.

== Geography ==
Novoishmetovo is located 27 km southeast of Dyurtyuli (the district's administrative centre) by road. Sabanayevo is the nearest rural locality.
