= Shamsutdin =

Shamsutdin Шамсутдин
- Village
- Location within Bashkortostan Location within Russia
- Coordinates: 55°25′N 55°26′E
- Country: Russia
- Region: Bashkortostan
- District: Birsky District
- Time zone: UTC+5:00

Shamsutdin (Russian: Шамсутдин; Bashkir: Шәмсетдин, Şämsetdin) is a rural locality (a village) in Kusekeyevsky Selsoviet, Birsky District, Bashkortostan, Russia. The population was 56 as of 2010. There is 1 street.

== Geography ==
Shamsutdin is located 13 km west of Birsk (the district's administrative centre) by road. Popovka is the nearest rural locality.
