= Atsuyarovo =

Atsuyarovo Атсуярово
- Village
- Location within Bashkortostan Location within Russia
- Coordinates: 55°22′N 54°56′E
- Country: Russia
- Region: Bashkortostan
- District: Dyurtyulinsky District
- Time zone: UTC+5:00

Atsuyarovo (Russian: Атсуярово; Bashkir: Атһөйәр, Athöyär) is a rural locality (a village) in Sukkulovsky Selsoviet, Dyurtyulinsky District, Bashkortostan, Russia. The population was 118 as of 2010. There are 2 streets.

== Geography ==
Atsuyarovo is located 13 km south of Dyurtyuli (the district's administrative centre) by road. Yukalikulevo is the nearest rural locality.
