= Novopetrovo =

Novopetrovo Новопетрово
- Selo
- Location within Bashkortostan Location within Russia
- Coordinates: 55°11′N 55°34′E
- Country: Russia
- Region: Bashkortostan
- District: Birsky District
- Time zone: UTC+5:00

Novopetrovo (Russian: Новопетрово) is a rural locality (a selo) in Staropetrovsky Selsoviet, Birsky District, Bashkortostan, Russia. The population was 21 as of 2010. There is 1 street.

== Geography ==
Novopetrovo is located 28 km south of Birsk (the district's administrative centre) by road. Starobiktimirovo is the nearest rural locality.
