= Bakhtybayevo =

Bakhtybayevo Бахтыбаево
- Selo
- Location within Bashkortostan Location within Russia
- Coordinates: 55°32′N 55°28′E
- Country: Russia
- Region: Bashkortostan
- District: Birsky District
- Time zone: UTC+5:00

Bakhtybayevo (Russian: Бахтыбаево; Bashkir: Бахтыбай, Baxtıbay) is a rural locality (a selo) and the administrative centre of Bakhtybayevsky Selsoviet, Birsky District, Bashkortostan, Russia. The population was 887 as of 2010. There are 9 streets.

== Geography ==
Bakhtybayevo is located 24 km north of Birsk (the district's administrative centre) by road. Novokulchubayevo is the nearest rural locality.
