= Novokangyshevo =

Novokangyshevo Новокангышево
- Selo
- Location within Bashkortostan Location within Russia
- Coordinates: 55°33′N 55°02′E
- Country: Russia
- Region: Bashkortostan
- District: Dyurtyulinsky District
- Time zone: UTC+5:00

Novokangyshevo (Russian: Новокангышево; Bashkir: Яңы Кәңгеш, Yañı Käñgeş) is a rural locality (a selo) in Uchpilinsky Selsoviet, Dyurtyulinsky District, Bashkortostan, Russia. The population was 423 as of 2010. There are 6 streets.

== Geography ==
Novokangyshevo is located 25 km northeast of Dyurtyuli (the district's administrative centre) by road. Kirgizki is the nearest rural locality.
