= Nizhnealkashevo =

Nizhnealkashevo Нижнеалькашево
- Village
- Location within Bashkortostan Location within Russia
- Coordinates: 55°31′N 54°39′E
- Country: Russia
- Region: Bashkortostan
- District: Dyurtyulinsky District
- Time zone: UTC+5:00

Nizhnealkashevo (Russian: Нижнеалькашево; Bashkir: Түбәнге Әлкәш, Tübänge Älkäş) is a rural locality (a village) in Ismailovsky Selsoviet, Dyurtyulinsky District, Bashkortostan, Russia. The population was 145 as of 2010. There are 2 streets.

== Geography ==
Nizhnealkashevo is located 16 km northwest of Dyurtyuli (the district's administrative centre) by road. Verkhnealkashevo is the nearest rural locality.
