= Bargata =

Bargata Баргата
- Village
- Location within Bashkortostan Location within Russia
- Coordinates: 55°34′N 55°07′E
- Country: Russia
- Region: Bashkortostan
- District: Dyurtyulinsky District
- Time zone: UTC+5:00

Bargata (Russian: Баргата; Bashkir: Барғаты, Barğatı) is a rural locality (a village) in Uchpilinsky Selsoviet, Dyurtyulinsky District, Bashkortostan, Russia. The population was 111 as of 2010. There are 2 streets.

== Geography ==
Bargata is located 33 km northeast of Dyurtyuli (the district's administrative centre) by road. Novobadrakovo is the nearest rural locality.
