= Nizhnelachentau =

Nizhnelachentau Нижнелачентау
- Selo
- Location within Bashkortostan Location within Russia
- Coordinates: 55°27′N 55°20′E
- Country: Russia
- Region: Bashkortostan
- District: Birsky District
- Time zone: UTC+5:00

Nizhnelachentau (Russian: Нижнелачентау; Bashkir: Түбәнге Ыласынтау, Tübänge Ilısıntaw) is a rural locality (a selo) in Verkhnelachentausky Selsoviet, Birsky District, Bashkortostan, Russia. The population was 77 as of 2010. There are 3 streets.

== Geography ==
Nizhnelachentau is located 35 km northwest of Birsk (the district's administrative centre) by road. Verkhnelachentau is the nearest rural locality.
