= Nizhnekargino =

Nizhnekargino Нижнекаргино
- Selo
- Location within Bashkortostan Location within Russia
- Coordinates: 55°28′N 54°43′E
- Country: Russia
- Region: Bashkortostan
- District: Dyurtyulinsky District
- Time zone: UTC+5:00

Nizhnekargino (Russian: Нижнекаргино; Bashkir: Түбәнге Ҡарғауыл, Tübänge Qarğawıl) is a rural locality (a selo) in Asyanovsky Selsoviet, Dyurtyulinsky District, Bashkortostan, Russia. The population was 188 as of 2010. There are 3 streets.

== Geography ==
Nizhnekargino is located 19 km southwest of Dyurtyuli (the district's administrative centre) by road. Verkhnekargino is the nearest rural locality.
