= Manyazybash =

Manyazybash Маньязыбаш
- Village
- Location within Bashkortostan Location within Russia
- Coordinates: 55°17′N 54°51′E
- Country: Russia
- Region: Bashkortostan
- District: Dyurtyulinsky District
- Time zone: UTC+5:00

Manyazybash (Russian: Маньязыбаш; Bashkir: Манъяҙыбаш, Manyaźıbaş) is a rural locality (a village) in Kukkuyanovsky Selsoviet, Dyurtyulinsky District, Bashkortostan, Russia. The population was 30 as of 2010. There is 1 street.

== Geography ==
Manyazybash is located 32 km south of Dyurtyuli (the district's administrative centre) by road. Karazirikovo is the nearest rural locality.
