= Uyady =

Uyady Уяды
- Village
- Location within Bashkortostan Location within Russia
- Coordinates: 55°39′N 54°52′E
- Country: Russia
- Region: Bashkortostan
- District: Dyurtyulinsky District
- Time zone: UTC+5:00

Uyady (Russian: Уяды; Bashkir: Уяҙы, Uyaźı) is a rural locality (a village) in Angasyakovsky Selsoviet, Dyurtyulinsky District, Bashkortostan, Russia. The population was 3 as of 2010. There is only 1 street.

== Geography ==
Uyady is located 28 km north of Dyurtyuli (the district's administrative centre) by road. Iskush is the nearest rural locality.
