= Moskovo =

Moskovo Москово
- Selo
- Location within Bashkortostan Location within Russia
- Coordinates: 55°19′N 55°04′E
- Country: Russia
- Region: Bashkortostan
- District: Dyurtyulinsky District
- Time zone: UTC+5:00

Moskovo (Russian: Москово; Bashkir: Мәскәү, Mäskäw) is a rural locality (a selo) and the administrative centre of Moskovsky Selsoviet, Dyurtyulinsky District, Bashkortostan, Russia. The population was 1,879 as of 2010. There are 21 streets.

== Geography ==
Nazitamak is located 27 km southeast of Dyurtyuli (the district's administrative centre) by road. Imay-Utarovo is the nearest rural locality.
