= Verkhnekargino =

Verkhnekargino Верхнекаргино
- Village
- Location within Bashkortostan Location within Russia
- Coordinates: 55°27′N 54°43′E
- Country: Russia
- Region: Bashkortostan
- District: Dyurtyulinsky District
- Time zone: UTC+5:00

Verkhnekargino (Russian: Верхнекаргино; Bashkir: Үрге Ҡарғауыл, Ürge Qarğawıl) is a rural locality (a village) in Asyanovsky Selsoviet, Dyurtyulinsky District, Bashkortostan, Russia. The population was 36 as of 2010. There are 2 streets.

== Geography ==
Verkhnekargino is located 18 km southwest of Dyurtyuli (the district's administrative centre) by road. Asyanovo is the nearest rural locality.
