= Yukalikulevo =

Yukalikulevo Юкаликулево
- Selo
- Location within Bashkortostan Location within Russia
- Coordinates: 55°23′N 54°59′E
- Country: Russia
- Region: Bashkortostan
- District: Dyurtyulinsky District
- Time zone: UTC+5:00

Yukalikulevo (Russian: Юкаликулево; Bashkir: Йүкәлекүл, Yükälekül) is a rural locality (a selo) in Sukkulovsky Selsoviet, Dyurtyulinsky District, Bashkortostan, Russia. The population was 364 as of 2010. There are 4 streets.

== Geography ==
Yukalikulevo is located 14 km southeast of Dyurtyuli (the district's administrative centre) by road. Atsuyarovo is the nearest rural locality.
