= Novokulchubayevo =

Novokulchubayevo Новокульчубаево
- Selo
- Location within Bashkortostan Location within Russia
- Coordinates: 55°30′N 55°26′E
- Country: Russia
- Region: Bashkortostan
- District: Birsky District
- Time zone: UTC+5:00

Novokulchubayevo (Russian: Новокульчубаево; Bashkir: Яңы Ҡолсобай, Yañı Qolsobay) is a rural locality (a selo) in Bakhtybayevsky Selsoviet, Birsky District, Bashkortostan, Russia. The population was 607 as of 2010. There are 9 streets.

== Geography ==
Novokulchubayevo is located 26 km northwest of Birsk (the district's administrative centre) by road. Bakhtybayevo is the nearest rural locality.
