= Uchpili =

Uchpili Учпили
- Selo
- Location within Bashkortostan Location within Russia
- Coordinates: 55°26′N 55°01′E
- Country: Russia
- Region: Bashkortostan
- District: Dyurtyulinsky District
- Time zone: UTC+5:00

Uchpili (Russian: Учпили; Bashkir: Өсбүлә, Ösbülä) is a rural locality (a selo) and the administrative centre of Uchpilinsky Selsoviet, Dyurtyulinsky District, Bashkortostan, Russia. The population was 457 as of 2010. There are 8 streets.

== Geography ==
Uchpili is located 14 km southeast of Dyurtyuli (the district's administrative centre) by road. Ayukashevo is the nearest rural locality.
