= Kazy-Yeldyak =

Kazy-Yeldyak Казы-Ельдяк
- Village
- Location within Bashkortostan Location within Russia
- Coordinates: 55°30′N 55°09′E
- Country: Russia
- Region: Bashkortostan
- District: Dyurtyulinsky District
- Time zone: UTC+5:00

Kazy-Yeldyak (Russian: Казы-Ельдяк; Bashkir: Ҡаҙы-Йәлдәк, Qaźı-Yäldäk) is a rural locality (a village) in Staroyantuzovsky Selsoviet, Dyurtyulinsky District, Bashkortostan, Russia. The population was 273 as of 2010. There are 4 streets.

== Geography ==
Kazy-Yeldyak is located 28 km northeast of Dyurtyuli (the district's administrative centre) by road. Baygildy is the nearest rural locality.
