= Kukkuyanovo =

Kukkuyanovo Куккуяново
- Selo
- Location within Bashkortostan Location within Russia
- Coordinates: 55°19′N 54°56′E
- Country: Russia
- Region: Bashkortostan
- District: Dyurtyulinsky District
- Time zone: UTC+5:00

Kukkuyanovo (Russian: Куккуяново; Bashkir: Күкҡуян, Kükquyan) is a rural locality (a selo) and the administrative centre of Kukkuyanovsky Selsoviet, Dyurtyulinsky District, Bashkortostan, Russia. The population was 708 as of 2010. There are 8 streets.

== Geography ==
Kukkuyanovo is located 25 km south of Dyurtyuli (the district's administrative centre) by road. Imay-Utarovo is the nearest rural locality.
