= Malosukhoyazovo =

Malosukhoyazovo Малосухоязово
- Selo
- Location within Bashkortostan Location within Russia
- Coordinates: 55°23′N 55°50′E
- Country: Russia
- Region: Bashkortostan
- District: Birsky District
- Time zone: UTC+5:00

Malosukhoyazovo (Russian: Малосухоязово; Bashkir: Бәләкәй Соҡаяҙ, Bäläkäy Soqayaź) is a rural locality (a selo) in Suslovsky Selsoviet, Birsky District, Bashkortostan, Russia. The population was 607 as of 2010. There are 5 streets.

== Geography ==
Malosukhoyazovo is located 22 km east of Birsk (the district's administrative centre) by road. Yemashevo is the nearest rural locality.
