= Kirgizki =

Kirgizki Киргизки
- Village
- Location within Bashkortostan Location within Russia
- Coordinates: 55°32′N 55°05′E
- Country: Russia
- Region: Bashkortostan
- District: Dyurtyulinsky District
- Time zone: UTC+5:00

Kirgizki (Russian: Киргизки; Bashkir: Ҡырғыҙ, Qırğıź) is a rural locality (a village) in Uchpilinsky Selsoviet, Dyurtyulinsky District, Bashkortostan, Russia. The population was 75 as of 2010. There are 2 streets.

== Geography ==
Kirgizki is located 27 km northeast of Dyurtyuli (the district's administrative centre) by road. Novokangyshevo is the nearest rural locality.
