= Nizhneatashevo =

Nizhneatashevo Нижнеаташево
- Selo
- Location within Bashkortostan Location within Russia
- Coordinates: 55°22′N 54°43′E
- Country: Russia
- Region: Bashkortostan
- District: Dyurtyulinsky District
- Time zone: UTC+5:00

Nizhneatashevo (Russian: Нижнеаташево; Bashkir: Түбәнге Аташ, Tübänge Ataş) is a rural locality (a selo) in Semiletovsky Selsoviet, Dyurtyulinsky District, Bashkortostan, Russia. The population was 521 as of 2010. There are 4 streets.

== Geography ==
Nizhneatashevo is located 17 km southwest of Dyurtyuli (the district's administrative centre) by road. Tashtau is the nearest rural locality.
