= Ayukashevo =

Ayukashevo Аюкашево
- Village
- Location within Bashkortostan Location within Russia
- Coordinates: 55°26′N 55°01′E
- Country: Russia
- Region: Bashkortostan
- District: Dyurtyulinsky District
- Time zone: UTC+5:00

Ayukashevo (Russian: Аюкашево; Bashkir: Айыуҡаш, Ayıwqaş) is a rural locality (a village) in Uchpilinsky Selsoviet, Dyurtyulinsky District, Bashkortostan, Russia. The population was 200 as of 2010. There is 1 street.

== Geography ==
Ayukashevo is located 14 km southeast of Dyurtyuli (the district's administrative centre) by road. Uchpili is the nearest rural locality.
