= Novobaishevo =

Novobaishevo Новобаишево
- Selo
- Location within Bashkortostan Location within Russia
- Coordinates: 55°26′N 55°15′E
- Country: Russia
- Region: Bashkortostan
- District: Birsky District
- Time zone: UTC+5:00

Novobaishevo (Russian: Новобаишево; Bashkir: Яңы Байыш, Yañı Bayış) is a rural locality (a selo) in Verkhnelachentausky Selsoviet, Birsky District, Bashkortostan, Russia. The population was 76 as of 2010. There are 2 streets.

== Geography ==
Novobaishevo is located 40 km northwest of Birsk (the district's administrative centre) by road. Nizhnelachentau is the nearest rural locality.
