= Angasyak =

Angasyak Ангасяк
- Selo
- Location within Bashkortostan Location within Russia
- Coordinates: 55°38′N 54°47′E
- Country: Russia
- Region: Bashkortostan
- District: Dyurtyulinsky District
- Time zone: UTC+5:00

Angasyak (Russian: Ангасяк; Bashkir: Эңгәсәк, Eñgäsäk) is a rural locality (a selo) and the administrative centre of Angasyakovsky Selsoviet, Dyurtyulinsky District, Bashkortostan, Russia. The population was 1,850 as of 2010. There are 20 streets.

== Geography ==
Angasyak is located 22 km north of Dyurtyuli (the district's administrative centre) by road. Veyalochnaya is the nearest rural locality.
