= Verkhnealkashevo =

Verkhnealkashevo Верхнеалькашево
- Village
- Location within Bashkortostan Location within Russia
- Coordinates: 55°30′N 54°36′E
- Country: Russia
- Region: Bashkortostan
- District: Dyurtyulinsky District
- Time zone: UTC+5:00

Verkhnealkashevo (Russian: Верхнеалькашево; Bashkir: Үрге Әлкәш, Ürge Älkäş) is a rural locality (a village) in Ismailovsky Selsoviet, Dyurtyulinsky District, Bashkortostan, Russia. The population was 109 as of 2010. There are 2 streets.

== Geography ==
Verkhnealkashevo is located 19 km west of Dyurtyuli (the district's administrative centre) by road. Nizhnealkashevo is the nearest rural locality.
