= Kamyshinka =

Kamyshinka Камышинка
- Selo
- Location within Bashkortostan Location within Russia
- Coordinates: 55°17′N 55°27′E
- Country: Russia
- Region: Bashkortostan
- District: Birsky District
- Time zone: UTC+5:00

Kamyshinka (Russian: Камышинка) is a rural locality (a selo) in Silantyevsky Selsoviet, Birsky District, Bashkortostan, Russia. The population was 117 as of 2010. There are 6 streets.

== Geography ==
Kamyshinka is located 18 km south of Birsk (the district's administrative centre) by road. Mordvinovka is the nearest rural locality.
