= Staroyantuzovo =

Staroyantuzovo Староянтузово
- Selo
- Location within Bashkortostan Location within Russia
- Coordinates: 55°28′N 55°04′E
- Country: Russia
- Region: Bashkortostan
- District: Dyurtyulinsky District
- Time zone: UTC+5:00

Staroyantuzovo (Russian: Староянтузово; Bashkir: Иҫке Яндыҙ, İśke Yandıź) is a rural locality (a selo) and the administrative centre of Staroyantuzovsky Selsoviet, Dyurtyulinsky District, Bashkortostan, Russia. The population was 586 as of 2010. There are 11 streets.

== Geography ==
Staroyantuzovo is located 20 km southeast of Dyurtyuli (the district's administrative centre) by road. Kaishevo is the nearest rural locality.
