= Yukalikul =

Yukalikul Юкаликуль
- Village
- Location within Bashkortostan Location within Russia
- Coordinates: 55°29′N 54°42′E
- Country: Russia
- Region: Bashkortostan
- District: Dyurtyulinsky District
- Time zone: UTC+5:00

Yukalikul (Russian: Юкаликуль; Bashkir: Йүкәлекүл, Yükälekül) is a rural locality (a village) in Takarlikovsky Selsoviet, Dyurtyulinsky District, Bashkortostan, Russia. The population was 100 as of 2010. There are 2 streets.

== Geography ==
Yukalikul is located 12 km northwest of Dyurtyuli (the district's administrative centre) by road. Yuntiryak is the nearest rural locality.
