= Mansurovo =

Mansurovo Мансурово
- Village
- Location within Bashkortostan Location within Russia
- Coordinates: 55°09′N 55°29′E
- Country: Russia
- Region: Bashkortostan
- District: Birsky District
- Time zone: UTC+5:00

Mansurovo (Russian: Мансурово; Bashkir: Мансур, Mansur) is a rural locality (a village) in Staropetrovsky Selsoviet, Birsky District, Bashkortostan, Russia. The population was 10 as of 2010. There are 2 streets.

== Geography ==
Mansurovo is located 36 km south of Birsk (the district's administrative centre) by road. Gorny is the nearest rural locality.
