= Kusekeyevo =

Kusekeyevo Кусекеево
- Selo
- Location within Bashkortostan Location within Russia
- Coordinates: 55°24′N 55°22′E
- Country: Russia
- Region: Bashkortostan
- District: Birsky District
- Time zone: UTC+5:00

Kusekeyevo (Russian: Кусекеево; Bashkir: Күсәкәй, Küsäkäy) is a rural locality (a selo) and the administrative centre of Kusekeyevsky Selsoviet, Birsky District, Bashkortostan, Russia. The population was 504 as of 2010. There are 11 streets.

== Geography ==
Kusekeyevo is located 16 km west of Birsk (the district's administrative centre) by road. Kandakovka is the nearest rural locality.

== Population ==
Population size
2002	2009	2010
495	↗ 507	↘ 504
