= Osinovka, Birsky District, Republic of Bashkortostan =

Osinovka Осиновка
- Selo
- Location within Bashkortostan Location within Russia
- Coordinates: 55°21′N 55°43′E
- Country: Russia
- Region: Bashkortostan
- District: Birsky District
- Time zone: UTC+5:00

Osinovka (Russian: Осиновка) is a rural locality (a selo) and the administrative centre of Osinovsky Selsoviet, Birsky District, Bashkortostan, Russia. The population was 980 as of 2010. There are 14 streets.

== Geography ==
Osinovka is located 16 km southeast of Birsk (the district's administrative centre) by road. Dubrovka is the nearest rural locality.
