= Romanovka =

Romanovka may refer to:

- Romanovka stratovolcano, a stratovolcano in central Kamchatka
- Romanovka (inhabited locality), name of several inhabited localities in Russia
- Romanovka, Kyrgyzstan, a village in Chuy Region, Kyrgyzstan
- Pristan (air base), known as Romanovka West by Western intelligence, an air base in Primorsky Krai, Russia

== See also ==
- Romanivka
