= Starobaltachevo, Dyurtyulinsky District, Republic of Bashkortostan =

Starobaltachevo Старобалтачево
- Village
- Location within Bashkortostan Location within Russia
- Coordinates: 55°32′N 54°43′E
- Country: Russia
- Region: Bashkortostan
- District: Dyurtyulinsky District
- Time zone: UTC+5:00

Starobaltachevo (Russian: Старобалтачево; Bashkir: Иҫке Балтас, İśke Baltas) is a rural locality (a village) in Ismailovsky Selsoviet, Dyurtyulinsky District, Bashkortostan, Russia. The population was 128 as of 2010. There are 3 streets.

== Geography ==
Starobaltachevo is located 15 km northwest of Dyurtyuli (the district's administrative centre) by road. Yuntiryak and Kushulevo are the nearest rural localities.
