= Chishma, Uguzevsky Selsoviet, Birsky District, Republic of Bashkortostan =

Chishma Чишма
- Village
- Location within Bashkortostan Location within Russia
- Coordinates: 55°16′38″N 55°38′41″E
- Country: Russia
- Region: Bashkortostan
- District: Birsky District

Population (2010)
  - Total: 24
- Time zone: UTC+5:00

Chishma (Russian: Чишма; Bashkir: Шишмә, Şişmä) is a rural locality (a village) in Uguzevsky Selsoviet, Birsky District, Bashkortostan, Russia. The population was 24 as of 2010.

== Geography ==
It is located 23 km from Birsk (the district's administrative centre) by road. Uguzevo is the nearest locality located 2 km away.
