= Romanovka, Birsky District, Republic of Bashkortostan =

Romanovka Романовка
- Village
- Location within Bashkortostan Location within Russia
- Coordinates: 55°18′N 55°39′E
- Country: Russia
- Region: Bashkortostan
- District: Birsky District
- Time zone: UTC+5:00

Romanovka (Russian: Романовка) is a rural locality (a village) in Uguzevsky Selsoviet, Birsky District, Bashkortostan, Russia. The population was 62 as of 2010. There are 2 streets.

== Geography ==
Romanovka is located 20 km southeast of Birsk (the district's administrative centre) by road. Chishma is the nearest rural locality.
