= Argamak =

Argamak Аргамак
- Village
- Location within Bashkortostan Location within Russia
- Coordinates: 55°28′N 54°53′E
- Country: Russia
- Region: Bashkortostan
- District: Dyurtyulinsky District
- Time zone: UTC+5:00

Argamak (Russian: Аргамак; Bashkir: Арғымаҡ, Arğımaq) is a rural locality (a village) in Dyurtyulinsky District, Bashkortostan, Russia. The population was 451 as of 2010.

== Geography ==
Argamak is located 3 km southeast of Dyurtyuli (the district's administrative centre) by road. Dyurtyuli is the nearest rural locality.
