= Chishma, Chishminsky Selsoviet, Birsky District, Republic of Bashkortostan =

Chishma Чишма
- Selo
- Location within Bashkortostan Location within Russia
- Coordinates: 55°19′N 55°14′E
- Country: Russia
- Region: Bashkortostan
- District: Birsky District
- Time zone: UTC+5:00

Chishma (Russian: Чишма; Bashkir: Шишмә, Şişmä) is a rural locality (a selo) and the administrative center of Chishminsky Selsoviet, Birsky District, Bashkortostan, Russia. The population was 596 as of 2010.

== Geography ==
It is located 25 km from Birsk.
