= Romanivka =

Romanivka (Ukrainian: Рома́нівка) may refer to the following places in Ukraine:

- Romanivka, Bereznehuvate settlement hromada, Bashtanka Raion, Mykolaiv Oblast
- Romanivka, Terebovlia Raion
- Romanivka, Ternopil Raion
- Romanivka, Berdychiv Raion

== See also ==
- Romanovka (disambiguation)
