= Chishma, Dyurtyulinsky District, Republic of Bashkortostan =

Chishma Чишма
- Selo
- Location within Bashkortostan Location within Russia
- Coordinates: 55°32′N 54°33′E
- Country: Russia
- Region: Bashkortostan
- District: Dyurtyulinsky District
- Time zone: UTC+5:00

Chishma (Russian: Чишма; Bashkir: Шишмә, Şişmä) is a rural locality (a selo) in Ismailovsky Selsoviet, Dyurtyulinsky District, Bashkortostan, Russia. The population was 472 as of 2010. There are 6 streets.

== Geography ==
Chishma is located 24 km northwest of Dyurtyuli (the district's administrative centre) by road. Zitembyak is the nearest rural locality.
