= Romanovka, Altai Krai =

Romanovka Романовка
- Selo
- Location within Altai Krai Location within Russia
- Coordinates: 51°22′N 81°30′E
- Country: Russia
- Region: Altai Krai
- District: Rubtsovsky District
- Time zone: UTC+7:00

Romanovka (Russian: Романовка) is a rural locality (a selo) in Novonikolayevsky Selsoviet, Rubtsovsky District, Altai Krai, Russia. The population was 378 as of 2013. There are 4 streets.

== Geography ==
Romanovka is located 33 km southeast of Rubtsovsk (the district's administrative centre) by road. Vishnyovka is the nearest rural locality.
