= Romanovsky District, Saratov Oblast =

Romanovsky District Романовский район (Russian)
- District
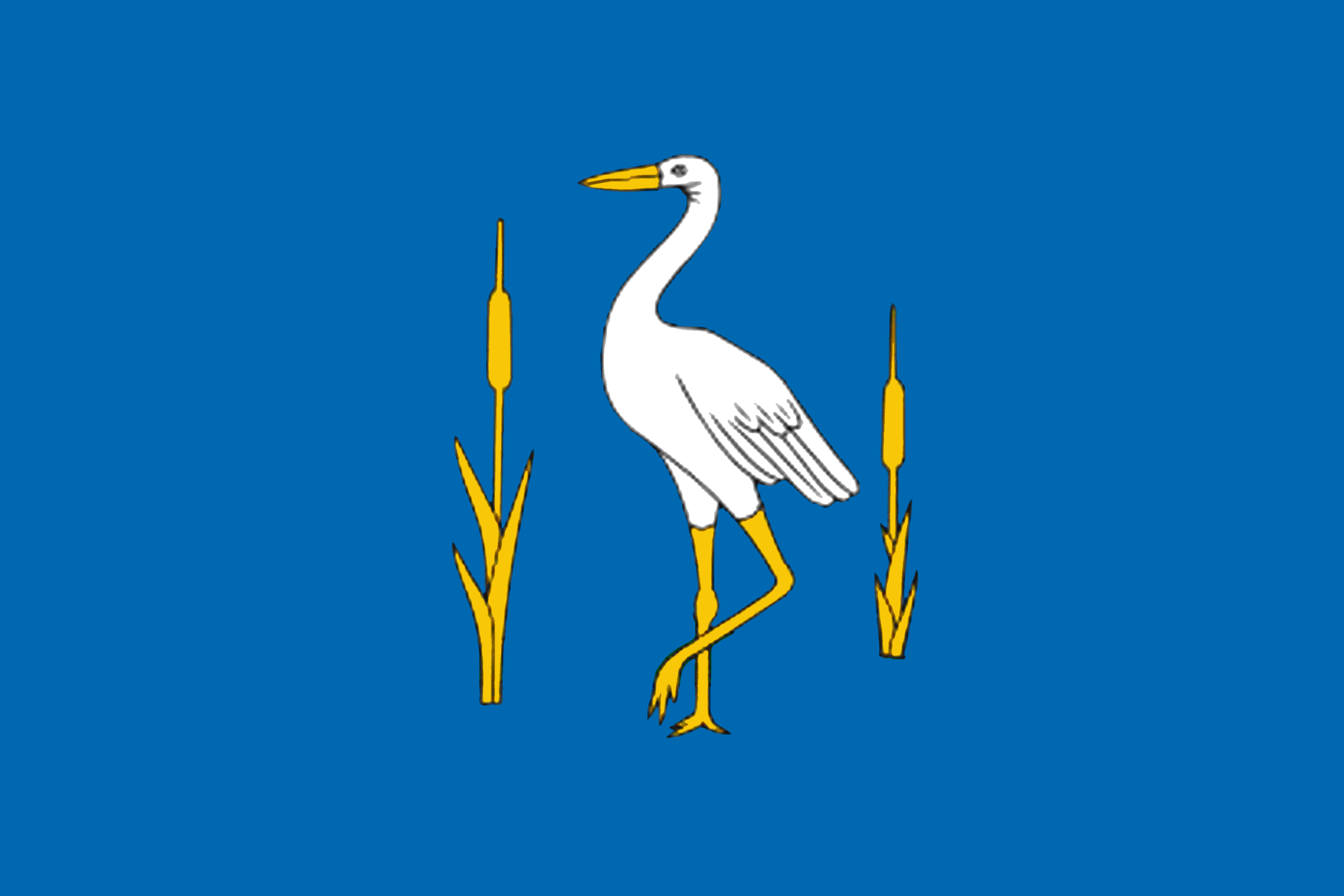
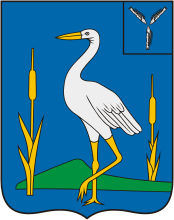
- Flag Coat of arms
- Location of Romanovsky District in Saratov Oblast
- Coordinates: 51°45′11″N 42°45′02″E
- Country: Russia
- Federal subject: Saratov Oblast
- Established: 23 July 1928
- Administrative center: Romanovka

Area
  - Total: 1,300 km^{2} (500 sq mi)

Population (2010 Census)
  - Total: 16,226
  - Density: 12/km^{2} (32/sq mi)
  - Urban: 44.8%
  - Rural: 55.2%

Administrative structure
  - Inhabited localities: 1 urban-type settlements, 20 rural localities

Municipal structure
  - Municipally incorporated as: Romanovsky Municipal District
  - Municipal divisions: 1 urban settlements, 6 rural settlements
- Time zone: UTC+4 (MSK+1)
- OKTMO ID: 63640000
- Website: http://romanovka.sarmo.ru/

Romanovsky District (Russian: Романовский райо́н) is an administrative and municipal district (raion), one of the thirty-eight in Saratov Oblast, Russia. It is located in the west of the oblast.

== Area ==
The area of the district is 1,300 square kilometers (500 sq mi). Its administrative center is the urban locality (a work settlement) of Romanovka.

== Demographics ==
Population: 16,226 (2010 Census); 18,150 (2002 Census); 19,404 (1989 Soviet census). The population of Romanovka accounts for 44.8% of the district's total population.
