= Chishmy, Miyakinsky District, Republic of Bashkortostan =

Chishmy Чишмы
- Village
- Location within Bashkortostan Location within Russia
- Coordinates: 53°40′N 55°15′E
- Country: Russia
- Region: Bashkortostan
- District: Miyakinsky District
- Time zone: UTC+5:00

Chishmy (Russian: Чишмы; Bashkir: Шишмә, Şişmä) is a rural locality (a village) in Urshakbashkaramalinsky Selsoviet, Miyakinsky District, Bashkortostan, Russia. The population was 25 as of 2010. There is 1 street.

== Geography ==
Chishmy is located 42 km east of Kirgiz-Miyaki (the district's administrative centre) by road. Aitovo is the nearest rural locality.
