= Chishma, Balyklykulsky Selsoviet, Aurgazinsky District, Republic of Bashkortostan =

Chishma Чишма
- Village
- Location within Bashkortostan Location within Russia
- Coordinates: 53°55′N 55°50′E
- Country: Russia
- Region: Bashkortostan
- District: Aurgazinsky District
- Time zone: UTC+5:00

Chishma (Russian: Чишма; Bashkir: Шишмә, Şişmä) is a rural locality (a village) in Balyklykulsky Selsoviet, Aurgazinsky District, Bashkortostan, Russia. The population was 65 as of 2010.

== Geography ==
It is located 12 km from Tolbazy and 3 km from Balyklykul.
