= Romanovka, Amur Oblast =

Romanovka Романовка
- Selo
- Location within Amur Oblast Location within Russia
- Coordinates: 50°21′N 129°17′E
- Country: Russia
- Region: Amur Oblast
- District: Oktyabrsky District
- Time zone: UTC+9:00

Romanovka (Russian: Романовка) is a rural locality (a selo) and the administrative center of Romanovsky Selsoviet of Oktyabrsky District, Amur Oblast, Russia. The population was 427 as of 2018. There are 8 streets.

== Geography ==
Romanovka is located 20 km east of Yekaterinoslavka (the district's administrative centre) by road. Borisovo is the nearest rural locality.
