= Osinovka, Polozovskoye Rural Settlement, Bolshesosnovsky District, Perm Krai =

Osinovka Осиновка
- Village
- Location within Perm Krai Location within Russia
- Coordinates: 57°18′N 54°23′E
- Country: Russia
- Region: Perm Krai
- District: Bolshesosnovsky District
- Time zone: UTC+5:00

Osinovka (Russian: Осиновка) is a rural locality (a village) in Polozovskoye Rural Settlement, Bolshesosnovsky District, Perm Krai, Russia. The population was 76 as of 2010. There are 3 streets.

== Geography ==
It is located 6.5 km south-west from Polozovo.
