= Romanovka, Chishminsky District, Republic of Bashkortostan =

Romanovka Романовка
- Selo
- Location within Bashkortostan Location within Russia
- Coordinates: 54°19′N 55°29′E
- Country: Russia
- Region: Bashkortostan
- District: Chishminsky District
- Time zone: UTC+5:00

Romanovka (Russian: Романовка) is a rural locality (a selo) in Chuvalkipovsky Selsoviet, Chishminsky District, Bashkortostan, Russia. The population was 8 as of 2010. There is 1 street.

== Geography ==
Romanovka is 42 km south of Chishmy, the district's administrative seat. Chuvalkipovo is the nearest rural locality.
