= Chishma, Baltachevsky District, Republic of Bashkortostan =

Chishma Чишма
- Village
- Location within Bashkortostan Location within Russia
- Coordinates: 55°51′N 55°57′E
- Country: Russia
- Region: Bashkortostan
- District: Baltachevsky District
- Time zone: UTC+5:00

Chishma (Russian: Чишма; Bashkir: Шишмә, Şişmä) is a rural locality (a village) in Verkhneyanaktayevsky Selsoviet, Baltachevsky District, Bashkortostan, Russia. The population was 152 as of 2010. There are 5 streets.

== Geography ==
Chishma is located 19 km south of Starobaltachevo (the district's administrative centre) by road. Ishtiryakovo is the nearest rural locality.
