= Romanovka, Romanovsky District, Saratov Oblast =

Romanovka Романовка
- Urban-type settlement
- Interactive map of Romanovka
- Location of Romanovka Romanovka (Saratov Oblast)
- Coordinates: 51.7406°N 42.7590°E
- Country: Russia
- Federal subject: Saratov Oblast
- Administrative district: Romanovsky District

Population (2010 Census)
  - Total: 7,271
  - Estimate (2021): 5,880 (−19.1%)
- Time zone: UTC+4 (MSK+1)
- Postal code: 412271
- OKTMO ID: 63640151051

Romanovka (Russian: Рома́новка) is an urban locality (an urban-type settlement) in Romanovsky District of Saratov Oblast, Russia. Population: 7,271 (2010 census); 7,804 (2002 census); 7,657 (1989 Soviet census).
