= Romanovka, Karmaskalinsky District, Republic of Bashkortostan =

Romanovka Романовка
- Village
- Location within Bashkortostan Location within Russia
- Coordinates: 54°28′N 56°01′E
- Country: Russia
- Region: Bashkortostan
- District: Karmaskalinsky District
- Time zone: UTC+5:00

Romanovka (Russian: Романовка) is a rural locality (a village) in Kabakovsky Selsoviet, Karmaskalinsky District, Bashkortostan, Russia. The population was 7 as of 2010. There are 2 streets.

== Geography ==
Romanovka is located 27 km northwest of Karmaskaly (the district's administrative centre) by road. Novomusino is the nearest rural locality.
