= Chishma, Tatyshlinsky District, Republic of Bashkortostan =

Chishma Чишма
- Village
- Location within Bashkortostan Location within Russia
- Coordinates: 56°08′N 55°30′E
- Country: Russia
- Region: Bashkortostan
- District: Tatyshlinsky District
- Time zone: UTC+5:00

Chishma (Russian: Чишма; Bashkir: Шишмә, Şişmä) is a rural locality (a village) in Shulganovsky Selsoviet, Tatyshlinsky District, Bashkortostan, Russia. The population was 48 as of 2010. There is 1 street.

== Geography ==
Chishma is located 38 km southwest of Verkhniye Tatyshly (the district's administrative centre) by road. Shulganovo is the nearest rural locality.
