= Romanovka, Meleuzovsky District, Republic of Bashkortostan =

Romanovka Романовка
- Village
- Location within Bashkortostan Location within Russia
- Coordinates: 52°58′N 55°46′E
- Country: Russia
- Region: Bashkortostan
- District: Meleuzovsky District
- Time zone: UTC+5:00

Romanovka (Russian: Романовка) is a rural locality (a village) in Partizansky Selsoviet, Meleuzovsky District, Bashkortostan, Russia. The population was five people as of 2010. There are two streets.

== Geography ==
Romanovka is located 12 km west of Meleuz (the district's administrative centre) by road. Mikhaylovka is the nearest rural locality.
