= Romanovka, Olkhovsky District, Volgograd Oblast =

Romanovka Романовка
- Selo
- Location within Volgograd Oblast Location within Russia
- Coordinates: 49°45′N 45°05′E
- Country: Russia
- Region: Volgograd Oblast
- District: Olkhovsky District
- Time zone: UTC+4:00

Romanovka (Russian: Романовка) is a rural locality (a selo) and the administrative center of Romanovskoye Rural Settlement, Olkhovsky District, Volgograd Oblast, Russia. The population was 543 as of 2010. There are 6 streets.

== Geography ==
Romanovka is located in steppe, on the Volga Upland, on the right bank of the Studyonovka River, 50 km southeast of Olkhovka (the district's administrative centre) by road. Studenovka is the nearest rural locality.
