= Osinovka, Votchinsky Selsoviet, Vologodsky District, Vologda Oblast =

Osinovka Осиновка
- Village
- Location within Vologda Oblast Location within Russia
- Coordinates: 59°33′N 39°08′E
- Country: Russia
- Region: Vologda Oblast
- District: Vologodsky District
- Time zone: UTC+3:00

Osinovka (Russian: Осиновка) is a rural locality (a village) in Novlenskoye Rural Settlement, Vologodsky District, Vologda Oblast, Russia. The population was 23 as of 2002.

== Geography ==
The distance to Vologda is 76.5 km, to Novlenskoye is 12 km. Mardasovo is the nearest rural locality.
