= Romanovka, Davlekanovsky District, Republic of Bashkortostan =

Romanovka Романовка
- Village
- Location within Bashkortostan Location within Russia
- Coordinates: 54°18′N 54°48′E
- Country: Russia
- Region: Bashkortostan
- District: Davlekanovsky District
- Time zone: UTC+5:00

Romanovka (Russian: Романовка) is a rural locality (a village) in Alginsky Selsoviet, Davlekanovsky District, Bashkortostan, Russia. The population was 273 as of 2010. There are 3 streets.

== Geography ==
Romanovka is located 21 km northwest of Davlekanovo (the district's administrative centre) by road. Alexandrovka is the nearest rural locality.
