= Chishma, Neftekamsk, Republic of Bashkortostan =

Chishma Чишма
- Village
- Location within Bashkortostan Location within Russia
- Coordinates: 56°15′N 54°30′E
- Country: Russia
- Region: Bashkortostan
- District: Neftekamsk
- Time zone: UTC+5:00

Chishma (Russian: Чишма; Bashkir: Шишмә, Şişmä) is a rural locality (a village) in Neftekamsk, Bashkortostan, Russia. The population was 102 as of 2010. There are two streets.
