= Chishma, Karmaskalinsky District, Republic of Bashkortostan =

Chishma Чишма
- Village
- Location within Bashkortostan Location within Russia
- Coordinates: 54°15′N 55°32′E
- Country: Russia
- Region: Bashkortostan
- District: Karmaskalinsky District
- Time zone: UTC+5:00

Chishma (Russian: Чишма; Bashkir: Шишмә, Şişmä) is a rural locality (a village) in Adzitarovsky Selsoviet, Karmaskalinsky District, Bashkortostan, Russia. The population was 84 as of 2010. There are 2 streets.

== Geography ==
Chishma is located 51 km southwest of Karmaskaly (the district's administrative centre) by road. Novomryasovo is the nearest rural locality.
