= Chishma, Buzdyaksky District, Republic of Bashkortostan =

Chishma Чишма
- Village
- Location within Bashkortostan Location within Russia
- Coordinates: 54°54′N 54°39′E
- Country: Russia
- Region: Bashkortostan
- District: Buzdyaksky District
- Time zone: UTC+5:00

Chishma (Russian: Чишма; Bashkir: Шишмә, Şişmä) is a rural locality (a village) in Kuzeyevsky Selsoviet, Buzdyaksky District, Bashkortostan, Russia. The population was 134 as of 2010. There are 3 streets.

== Geography ==
Chishma is located 44 km north of Buzdyak (the district's administrative centre) by road. Pismyantamak is the nearest rural locality.
