= Birsk =

Town in Bashkortostan, Russia

Birsk Бирск
- Town

Other transcription(s)
  - Bashkir: Бөрө; Börö
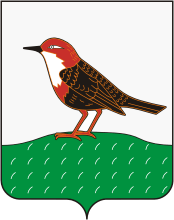
- Flag Coat of arms
- Interactive map of Birsk
- Location of Birsk Birsk (Bashkortostan)
- Coordinates: 55°25′N 55°32′E
- Country: Russia
- Federal subject: Bashkortostan
- Founded: 1663
- Town status since: 1781
- Elevation: 160 m (520 ft)

Population (2010 Census)
  - Total: 41,635
  - Estimate (2025): 44,611 (+7.1%)

Administrative status
  - Subordinated to: town of republic significance of Birsk
  - Capital of: Birsky District, town of republic significance of Birsk

Municipal status
  - Municipal district: Birsky Municipal District
  - Urban settlement: Birsk Urban Settlement
  - Capital of: Birsky Municipal District, Birsk Urban Settlement
- Time zone: UTC+5 (MSK+2)
- Postal codes: 452450-452453, 452455, 452459
- OKTMO ID: 80613101001

Birsk (Russian: Бирск; Bashkir: Бөрө, romanized: Börö) is a town in the Republic of Bashkortostan, Russia, located on the right bank of the Belaya River, 102 kilometers (63 mi) from Ufa, the capital of the republic. Population: 41,635 (2010 census); 39,992 (2002 census); 34,881 (1989 Soviet census).

== History ==
Birsk was founded in 1663 and granted town status in 1781. From 1865 to 1919 it was part of Ufa Governorate.

== Administrative and municipal status ==
Within the framework of administrative divisions, Birsk serves as the administrative center of Birsky District, even though it is not a part of it. As an administrative division, it is, together with two rural localities, incorporated separately as the town of republic significance of Birsk—an administrative unit with the status equal to that of the districts. As a municipal division, the town of republic significance of Birsk is incorporated within Birsky Municipal District as Birsk Urban Settlement.

== Demographics ==
Ethnic composition:

- Russians: 57%
- Tatars: 19.2%
- Bashkirs: 10.9%
- Mari: 10.7%
