= Birsky District =

Birsky District Бирский район (Russian)
- District

Other transcription(s)
  - Bashkir: Бөрө районы
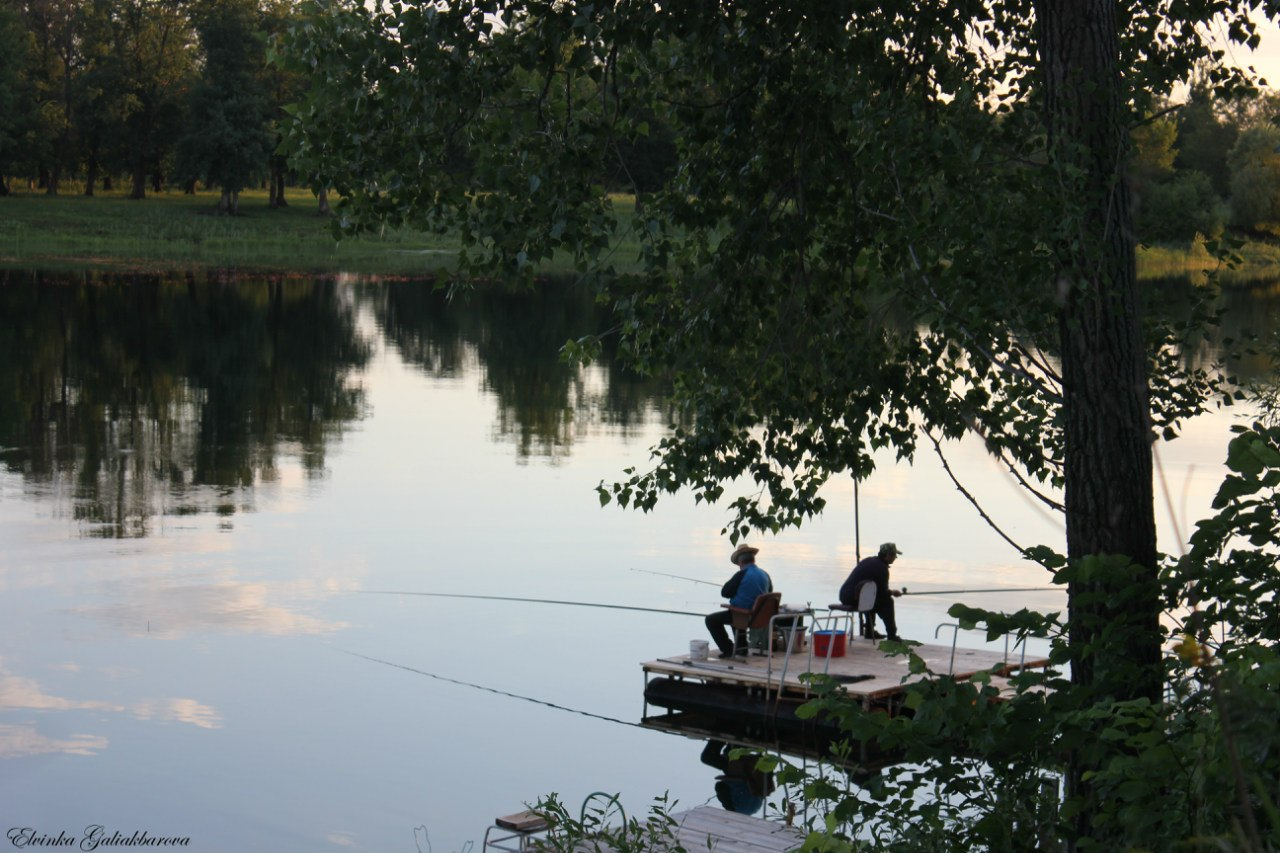
- Fishing on Lake Shamsutdin, Birsky District

- Flag Coat of arms
- Location of Birsky District in the Republic of Bashkortostan
- Coordinates: 55°25′N 55°32′E
- Country: Russia
- Federal subject: Republic of Bashkortostan
- Established: 1930
- Administrative center: Birsk

Area
  - Total: 1,786.49 km^{2} (689.77 sq mi)

Population (2010 Census)
  - Total: 17,924
  - Estimate (2018): 64,546 (+260.1%)
  - Density: 10.033/km^{2} (25.986/sq mi)
  - Urban: 0%
  - Rural: 100%

Administrative structure
  - Administrative divisions: 14 Selsoviets
  - Inhabited localities: 75 rural localities

Municipal structure
  - Municipally incorporated as: Birsky Municipal District
  - Municipal divisions: 1 urban settlements, 14 rural settlements
- Time zone: UTC+5 (MSK+2)
- OKTMO ID: 80613000
- Website: http://www.admbirsk.ru

Population of Birsky District
- 2010 Census: 17,924
- 2002 Census: 19,883
- 1989 Census: 18,933
- 1979 Census: 23,116

Birsky District (Russian: Би́рский райо́н; Bashkir: Бөрө районы,Börö rayonı; Meadow Mari: Пӱрӧ кундем, Pürö kundem; Tatar: Бөре районы, Böre rayonı) is an administrative and municipal district (raion), one of the fifty-four in the Republic of Bashkortostan, Russia. It is located in the north of the republic and borders with Burayevsky District in the north, Mishkinsky District in the northeast and east, Blagoveshchensky District in the southeast, Kushnarenkovsky District in the south, and with Dyurtyulinsky District in the west. The area of the district is 1,786.49 square kilometers (689.77 sq mi). Its administrative center is the town of Birsk (which is not administratively a part of the district). As of the 2010 Census, the total population of the district was 17,924.

== History ==
The district was established in 1930.

== Administrative and municipal status ==
Within the framework of administrative divisions, Birsky District is one of the fifty-four in the Republic of Bashkortostan. It is divided into fourteen selsoviets, comprising seventy-five rural localities. The town of Birsk serves as its administrative center, despite being incorporated separately as a town of republic significance—an administrative unit with the status equal to that of the districts (and which, in addition to Birsk, also includes two rural localities).

As a municipal division, the district is incorporated as Birsky Municipal District, with the town of republic significance of Birsk being incorporated within it as Birsk Urban Settlement. Its fourteen selsoviets are incorporated as fourteen rural settlements within the municipal district. The town of Birsk serves as the administrative center of the municipal district as well.
