= Dyurtyuli =

Town in Bashkortostan, Russia

Dyurtyuli Дюртюли
- Town

Other transcription(s)
  - Bashkir: Дүртөйлө; Dürtöylö
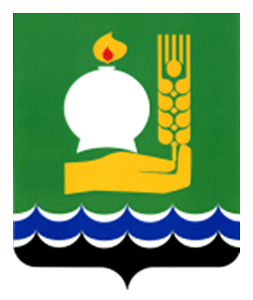
- Coat of arms
- Interactive map of Dyurtyuli
- Location of Dyurtyuli Dyurtyuli (Bashkortostan)
- Coordinates: 55°29′N 54°52′E
- Country: Russia
- Federal subject: Bashkortostan
- Founded: 1795
- Town status since: 1989
- Elevation: 100 m (330 ft)

Population (2010 Census)
  - Total: 31,274
  - Estimate (2021): 31,185 (−0.3%)

Administrative status
  - Subordinated to: town of republic significance of Dyurtyuli
  - Capital of: Dyurtyulinsky District, town of republic significance of Dyurtyuli

Municipal status
  - Municipal district: Dyurtyulinsky Municipal District
  - Urban settlement: Dyurtyuli Urban Settlement
  - Capital of: Dyurtyulinsky Municipal District, Dyurtyuli Urban Settlement
- Time zone: UTC+5 (MSK+2)
- Postal code: 452320
- OKTMO ID: 80624101001

Dyurtyuli (Russian: Дюртюли; Bashkir: Дүртөйлө, Dürtöylö) is a town in the Republic of Bashkortostan, Russia, located on the left bank of the Belaya River 126 kilometers (78 mi) northwest of Ufa. Population: 31,274 (2010 census); 29,984 (2002 census); 25,264 (1989 Soviet census).

== Etymology ==
In the Tatar and Bashkir languages, the name of the town means "four houses".

== History ==
The first mention of the town was in 1795. Urban-type settlement status was granted to it in 1964; town status was granted in 1989.

== Administrative and municipal status ==
Within the framework of administrative divisions, Dyurtyuli serves as the administrative center of Dyurtyulinsky District, even though it is not a part of it. As an administrative division, it is, together with the village of Argamak, incorporated separately as the town of republic significance of Dyurtyuli—an administrative unit with the status equal to that of the districts. As a municipal division, the town of republic significance of Duyrtyuli is incorporated within Dyurtyulinsky Municipal District as Dyurtyuli Urban Settlement.

== Demographics ==
As of the 2002 Census, the ethnic composition of the town was:

- Tatars: 64.9%
- Bashkirs: 22.5%
- Russians: 9.7%
- Mari: 1.6%
