= Dyurtyulinsky District =

Dyurtyulinsky District Дюртюлинский район (Russian)
- District

Other transcription(s)
  - Bashkir: Дүртөйлө районы
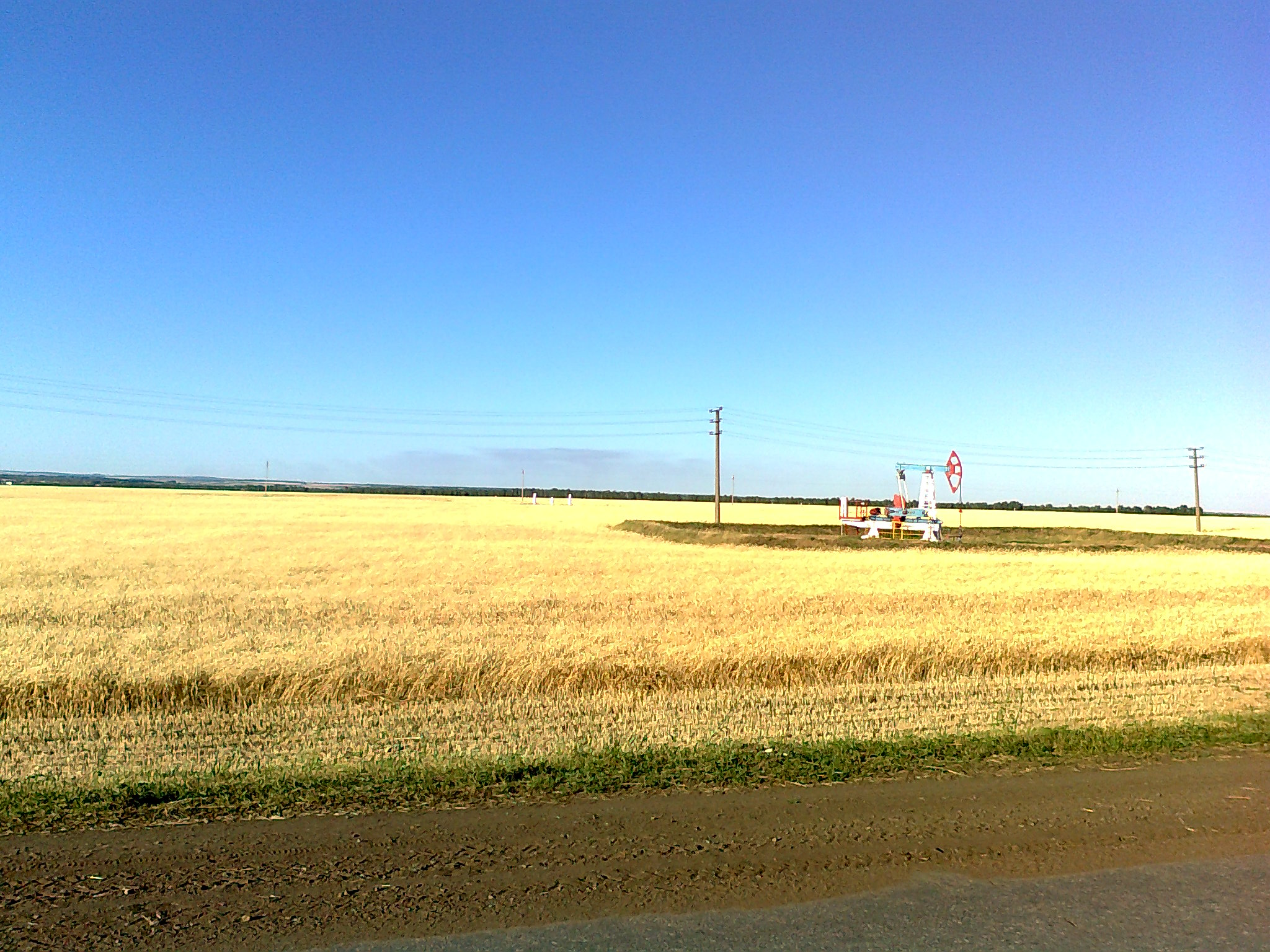
- Field near the village Semiletka, Dyurtyulinsky District

- Flag Coat of arms
- Location of Dyurtyulinsky District in the Republic of Bashkortostan
- Coordinates: 55°29′N 54°52′E
- Country: Russia
- Federal subject: Republic of Bashkortostan
- Established: August 20, 1930
- Administrative center: Dyurtyuli

Area
  - Total: 1,670 km^{2} (640 sq mi)

Population (2010 Census)
  - Total: 32,701
  - Density: 19.6/km^{2} (50.7/sq mi)
  - Urban: 0%
  - Rural: 100%

Administrative structure
  - Administrative divisions: 14 Selsoviets
  - Inhabited localities: 86 rural localities

Municipal structure
  - Municipally incorporated as: Dyurtyulinsky Municipal District
  - Municipal divisions: 1 urban settlements, 14 rural settlements
- Time zone: UTC+5 (MSK+2)
- OKTMO ID: 80624000
- Website: http://admdurtuli.ru

Dyurtyulinsky District (Russian: Дюртюли́нский райо́н; Bashkir: Дүртөйлө районы, translit. Dürtöylö rayonı) is an administrative and municipal district (raion), one of the fifty-four in the Republic of Bashkortostan, Russia. It is located in the northwest of the republic and borders with Kaltasinsky District in the north, Burayevsky District in the northeast and east, Birsky District in the east and southeast, Kushnarenkovsky and Chekmagushevsky Districts in the south, Ilishevsky District in the west, and with Krasnokamsky District in the northwest. The area of the district is 1,670 square kilometers (640 sq mi). Its administrative center is the town of Dyurtyuli (which is not administratively a part of the district). As of the 2010 Census, the total population of the district was 32,701.

== History ==
The district was established on August 20, 1930.

== Administrative and municipal status ==
Within the framework of administrative divisions, Dyurtyulinsky District is one of the fifty-four in the Republic of Bashkortostan. It is divided into fourteen selsoviets, comprising eighty-six rural localities. The town of Dyurtyuli serves as its administrative center, despite being incorporated separately as a town of republic significance—an administrative unit with the status equal to that of the districts (and which, in addition to Dyurtyuli, also includes one rural locality).

As a municipal division, the district is incorporated as Dyurtyulinsky Municipal District, with the town of republic significance of Dyurtyuli being incorporated within it as Dyurtyuli Urban Settlement. Its fourteen selsoviets are incorporated as fourteen rural settlements within the municipal district. The town of Dyurtyuli serves as the administrative center of the municipal district as well.

== Demographics ==
Population of Dyurtyulinsky District
- 2010 Census: 32,701
- 2002 Census: 32,988
- 1989 Census: 56,573
- 1979 Census: 55,022

In terms of ethnic composition, 49.3% are Tatars, 36.0% are Bashkirs, 7.4% are Russians, and 6.1% are Mari.
