= Novonikolayevka =

Novonikolayevka may refer to:

- Novosibirsk, Russia
- Novonikolayevka (Kupinsky District), Russia
- Novonikolayevka, Republic of Dagestan, Russia
- Novonikolayevka, Altai Krai, Russia
- Novonikolayevka, Amur Oblast, Russia
- Novonikolayevka, Volgograd Oblast, Russia
- Novonikolayevka, Belgorod Oblast, Russia
- Novonikolayevka, Belebeyevsky District, Republic of Bashkortostan, Russia
- Novonikolayevka, Zianchurinsky District, Republic of Bashkortostan, Russia
- Novonikolayevka, Mishkinsky District, Republic of Bashkortostan, Russia
- Novonikolayevka, Yermekeyevsky District, Republic of Bashkortostan, Russia
- Novonikolayevka, Ishimbaysky District, Republic of Bashkortostan, Russia
- Novonikolayevka, Sterlitamaksky District, Republic of Bashkortostan, Russia
- Novonikolayevka, Sterlibashevsky District, Republic of Bashkortostan, Russia
- Novonikolayevka, Miyakinsky District, Republic of Bashkortostan, Russia
- Novonikolayevka, Fyodorovsky District, Republic of Bashkortostan, Russia
- Novonikolayevka, a disappeared village by the banks of the Baganyonok river, Russia
- Novonikolayevka, Azerbaijan
- Novonikolayevka, Kyrgyzstan, a village in Chuy Region, Kyrgyzstan
