= Tigirmenevo =

Village in Mishkinsky District, Bashkortostan, Russia

Tigirmenevo Тигирменево
- Village
- Location within Bashkortostan Location within Russia
- Coordinates: 55°40′43″N 55°39′42″E
- Country: Russia
- Region: Bashkortostan
- District: Mishkinsky District
- Time zone: UTC+5:00

Tigirmenevo (Russian: Тигирменево; Bashkir: Тигермән, Tigermän) is a rural locality (a village) in Baymurzinsky Selsoviet, Mishkinsky District, Bashkortostan, Russia. The population was 241 as of 2010. There are 4 streets.

== Geography ==
Tigirmenevo is located 50 km northwest of Mishkino (the district's administrative centre) by road. Kyzyl-Yul is the nearest rural locality.
