= Uryady =

Village in Mishkinsky District, Bashkortostan, Russia

Uryady Урьяды
- Village
- Location within Bashkortostan Location within Russia
- Coordinates: 55°25′N 56°04′E
- Country: Russia
- Region: Bashkortostan
- District: Mishkinsky District
- Time zone: UTC+5:00

Uryady (Russian: Урьяды; Bashkir: Уръяҙы, Uryaźı) is a rural locality (a village) and the administrative centre of Uryadinsky Selsoviet, Mishkinsky District, Bashkortostan, Russia. The population was 221 as of 2010. There are 5 streets.

== Geography ==
Uryady is located 19 km southeast of Mishkino (the district's administrative centre) by road. Sabayevo is the nearest rural locality.
