= Kreshchenskoye =

Village in Mishkinsky District, Bashkortostan, Russia

Kreshchenskoye Крещенское
- Village
- Location within Bashkortostan Location within Russia
- Coordinates: 55°33′N 56°07′E
- Country: Russia
- Region: Bashkortostan
- District: Mishkinsky District
- Time zone: UTC+5:00

Kreshchenskoye (Russian: Крещенское) is a rural locality (a village) in Staroarzamatovsky Selsoviet, Mishkinsky District, Bashkortostan, Russia. The population was 29 as of 2010. There is 1 street.

== Geography ==
Kreshchenskoye is located 19 km northeast of Mishkino (the district's administrative centre) by road. Ozerki is the nearest rural locality.
