= Rayevka =

Village in Mishkinsky District, Bashkortostan, Russia

Rayevka Раевка
- Village
- Location within Bashkortostan Location within Russia
- Coordinates: 55°40′N 55°31′E
- Country: Russia
- Region: Bashkortostan
- District: Mishkinsky District
- Time zone: UTC+5:00

Rayevka (Russian: Раевка) is a rural locality (a village) in Churayevsky Selsoviet, Mishkinsky District, Bashkortostan, Russia. The population was 167 as of 2010. There are 3 streets.

== Geography ==
Rayevka is located 50 km northwest of Mishkino (the district's administrative centre) by road. Mayevka is the nearest rural locality.
