= Terekeyevo =

Village in Mishkinsky District, Bashkortostan, Russia

Terekeyevo Терекеево
- Village
- Location within Bashkortostan Location within Russia
- Coordinates: 55°42′N 55°55′E
- Country: Russia
- Region: Bashkortostan
- District: Mishkinsky District
- Time zone: UTC+5:00

Terekeyevo (Russian: Терекеево; Bashkir: Тирәкәй, Tiräkäy) is a rural locality (a village) in Mavlyutovsky Selsoviet, Mishkinsky District, Bashkortostan, Russia. The population was 130 as of 2010. There are 5 streets.

== Geography ==
Terekeyevo is located 25 km north of Mishkino (the district's administrative centre) by road. Staroatnagulovo is the nearest rural locality.
