= Yubaykulevo =

Village in Mishkinsky District, Bashkortostan, Russia

Yubaykulevo Юбайкулево
- Village
- Location within Bashkortostan Location within Russia
- Coordinates: 55°40′N 55°53′E
- Country: Russia
- Region: Bashkortostan
- District: Mishkinsky District
- Time zone: UTC+5:00

Yubaykulevo (Russian: Юбайкулево; Bashkir: Юбайкүл, Yubaykül) is a rural locality (a village) in Bolsheshadinsky Selsoviet, Mishkinsky District, Bashkortostan, Russia. The population was 19 as of 2010. There is 1 street.

== Geography ==
Yubaykulevo is located 19 km north of Mishkino (the district's administrative centre) by road. Karasimovo is the nearest rural locality.
