= Kayrakovo =

Village in Mishkinsky District, Bashkortostan, Russia

Kayrakovo Кайраково
- Village
- Location within Bashkortostan Location within Russia
- Coordinates: 55°33′N 55°42′E
- Country: Russia
- Region: Bashkortostan
- District: Mishkinsky District
- Time zone: UTC+5:00

Kayrakovo (Russian: Кайраково; Bashkir: Ҡайраҡ, Qayraq; Meadow Mari: Монар, Monar) is a rural locality (a village) and the administrative centre of Kayrakovsky Selsoviet, Mishkinsky District, Bashkortostan, Russia. The population was 585 as of 2010. There are 11 streets.

== Geography ==
Kayrakovo is located 22 km west of Mishkino (the district's administrative centre) by road. Chebykovo is the nearest rural locality.
