= Starokulchubayevo =

Village in Mishkinsky District, Bashkortostan, Russia

Starokulchubayevo Старокульчубаево
- Village
- Location within Bashkortostan Location within Russia
- Coordinates: 55°37′N 55°30′E
- Country: Russia
- Region: Bashkortostan
- District: Mishkinsky District
- Time zone: UTC+5:00

Starokulchubayevo (Russian: Старокульчубаево; Bashkir: Иҫке Ҡолсобай, İśke Qolsobay) is a rural locality (a village) in Tynbayevsky Selsoviet, Mishkinsky District, Bashkortostan, Russia. The population was 400 as of 2010. There are 8 streets.

== Geography ==
Starokulchubayevo is located 47 km northwest of Mishkino (the district's administrative centre) by road. Tynbayevo is the nearest rural locality.
