= Ishimovo =

Ishimovo (Russian: Ишимово) is the name of several rural localities in Russia:

- Ishimovo, Ishimbaysky District, Republic of Bashkortostan, a village in Petrovsky Selsoviet of Ishimbaysky District in the Republic of Bashkortostan
- Ishimovo, Mishkinsky District, Republic of Bashkortostan, a village in Baymurzinsky Selsoviet of Mishkinsky District in the Republic of Bashkortostan
- Ishimovo, Mari El Republic, a village in Russko-Lyazhmarinsky Rural Okrug of Paranginsky District in the Mari El Republic; 56°50′N 49°29′E
- Ishimovo, Bardymsky District, Perm Krai, a village in Bardymsky District of Perm Krai
- Ishimovo, Oktyabrsky District, Perm Krai, a selo in Oktyabrsky District of Perm Krai
- Ishimovo, Republic of Tatarstan, a village in Kamsko-Ustyinsky District of the Republic of Tatarstan
