= Lepeshkino =

Village in Mishkinsky District, Bashkortostan, Russia

Lepeshkino Лепешкино
- Village
- Location within Bashkortostan Location within Russia
- Coordinates: 55°42′N 55°40′E
- Country: Russia
- Region: Bashkortostan
- District: Mishkinsky District
- Time zone: UTC+5:00

Lepeshkino (Russian: Лепешкино) is a rural locality (a village) in Baymurzinsky Selsoviet, Mishkinsky District, Bashkortostan, Russia. The population was 299 as of 2010. There are 4 streets.

== Geography ==
Lepeshkino is located 53 km northwest of Mishkino (the district's administrative centre) by road. Kyzyl-Yul is the nearest rural locality.
