= Tatarbayevo =

Selo in Mishkinsky District, Bashkortostan, Russia

Tatarbayevo Татарбаево
- Selo
- Location within Bashkortostan Location within Russia
- Coordinates: 55°38′N 55°59′E
- Country: Russia
- Region: Bashkortostan
- District: Mishkinsky District
- Time zone: UTC+5:00

Tatarbayevo (Russian: Татарбаево; Bashkir: Татарбай, Tatarbay) is a rural locality (a selo) and the administrative centre of Mavlyutovsky Selsoviet, Mishkinsky District, Bashkortostan, Russia. The population was 445 as of 2010. There are 9 streets.

== Geography ==
Tatarbayevo is located 13 km north of Mishkino (the district's administrative centre) by road. Yelyshevo is the nearest rural locality.
