= Kigazytamakovo =

Village in Mishkinsky District, Bashkortostan, Russia

Kigazytamakovo Кигазытамаково
- Village
- Location within Bashkortostan Location within Russia
- Coordinates: 55°28′N 55°50′E
- Country: Russia
- Region: Bashkortostan
- District: Mishkinsky District
- Time zone: UTC+5:00

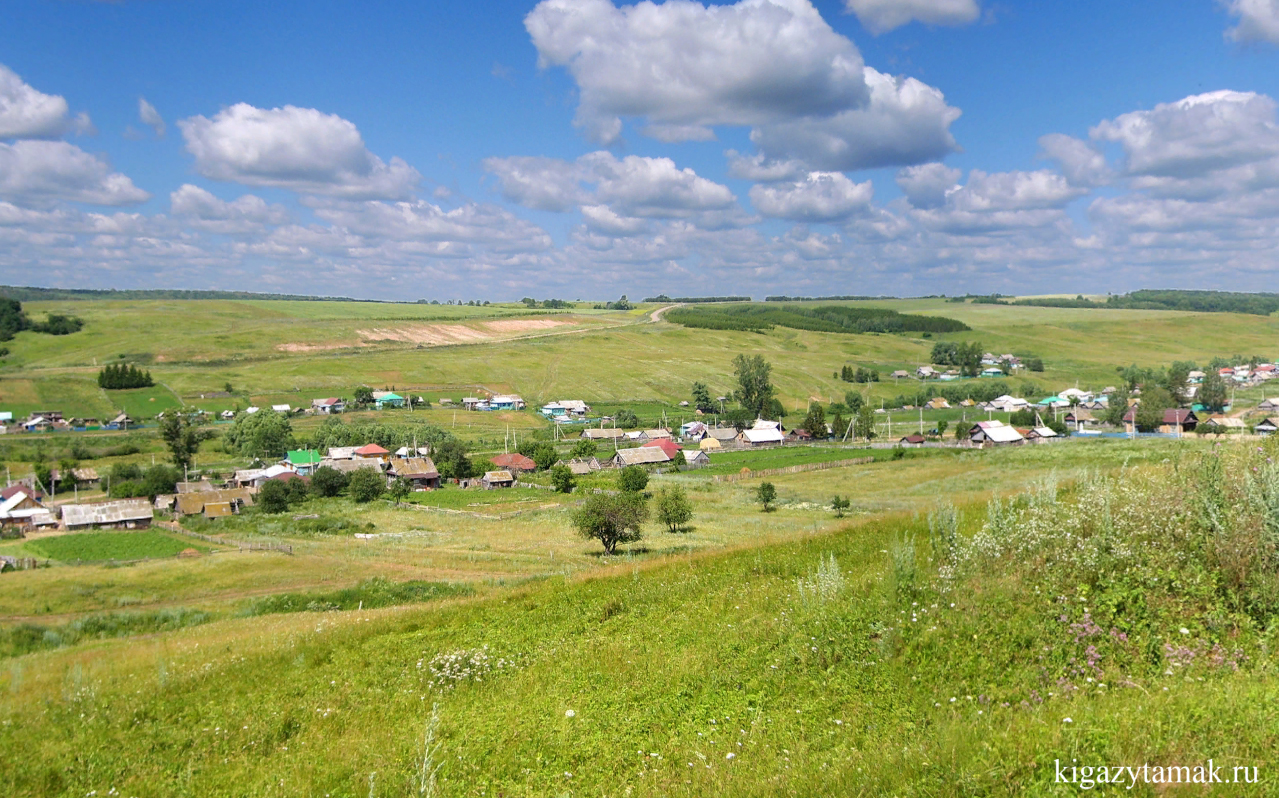
Kigazytamakovo

Kigazytamakovo (Russian: Кигазытамаково; Bashkir: Ҡыйғаҙытамаҡ, Qıyğaźıtamaq) is a rural locality (a village) in Mishkinsky Selsoviet, Mishkinsky District, Bashkortostan, Russia. The population was 184 as of 2010. There are 7 streets.

== Geography ==
Kigazytamakovo is located 19 km southwest of Mishkino (the district's administrative centre) by road. Leninskoye is the nearest rural locality.
