= Novoklyuchevo =

Village in Mishkinsky District, Bashkortostan, Russia

Novoklyuchevo Новоключево
- Village
- Location within Bashkortostan Location within Russia
- Coordinates: 55°35′N 55°46′E
- Country: Russia
- Region: Bashkortostan
- District: Mishkinsky District
- Time zone: UTC+5:00

Novoklyuchevo (Russian: Новоключево; Bashkir: Яңы Ключево, Yañı Klyuçevo; Meadow Mari: Шаде Шогертен, Šade Šogerten) is a rural locality (a village) in Mishkinsky Selsoviet, Mishkinsky District, Bashkortostan, Russia. The population was 154 as of 2010. There are 2 streets.

== Geography ==
Novoklyuchevo is located 17 km northwest of Mishkino (the district's administrative centre) by road. Malyye Shady is the nearest rural locality.
