= Ukozyash =

Village in Mishkinsky District, Bashkortostan, Russia

Ukozyash Укозяш
- Village
- Location within Bashkortostan Location within Russia
- Coordinates: 55°40′N 56°08′E
- Country: Russia
- Region: Bashkortostan
- District: Mishkinsky District
- Time zone: UTC+5:00

Ukozyash (Russian: Укозяш; Bashkir: Укузәш, Ukuzäş) is a rural locality (a village) in Novotroitsky Selsoviet, Mishkinsky District, Bashkortostan, Russia. The population was 156 as of 2010. There are 2 streets.

== Geography ==
Ukozyash is located 23 km northeast of Mishkino (the district's administrative centre) by road. Malonakaryakovo is the nearest rural locality.
