= Kameyevo =

Selo in Mishkinsky District, Bashkortostan, Russia

Kameyevo Камеево
- Selo
- Location within Bashkortostan Location within Russia
- Coordinates: 55°28′N 56°05′E
- Country: Russia
- Region: Bashkortostan
- District: Mishkinsky District
- Time zone: UTC+5:00

Kameyevo (Russian: Камеево; Bashkir: Камай, Kamay; Meadow Mari: Кемей, Kemej) is a rural locality (a village) and the administrative centre of Kameyevsky Selsoviet, Mishkinsky District, Bashkortostan, Russia. The population was 693 as of 2010. There are 15 streets.

== Geography ==
Kameyevo is located 13 km southeast of Mishkino (the district's administrative centre) by road. Russkoye Baybakovo is the nearest rural locality.
