= Novokarachevo =

Village in Mishkinsky District, Bashkortostan, Russia

Novokarachevo Новокарачево
- Village
- Location within Bashkortostan Location within Russia
- Coordinates: 55°40′N 56°00′E
- Country: Russia
- Region: Bashkortostan
- District: Mishkinsky District
- Time zone: UTC+5:00

Novokarachevo (Russian: Новокарачево; Bashkir: Яңы Ҡарас, Yañı Qaras) is a rural locality (a village) in Mavlyutovsky Selsoviet, Mishkinsky District, Bashkortostan, Russia. The population was 114 as of 2010, and there are 3 streets in the village.

== Geography ==
Novokarachevo is located 17 km north of Mishkino (the district's administrative centre) by road. Mavlyutovo is the nearest rural locality.
