= Bolshiye Shady =

Village in Mishkinsky District, Bashkortostan, Russia

Bolshiye Shady Большие Шады
- Village
- Location within Bashkortostan Location within Russia
- Coordinates: 55°39′N 55°48′E
- Country: Russia
- Region: Bashkortostan
- District: Mishkinsky District

Population (2010)
  - Total: 533
- Time zone: UTC+5:00
- Postal code: 452345

Bolshiye Shady (Russian: Большие Шады; Bashkir: Оло Шаҙы, Olo Şaźı) is a rural locality (a village) and the administrative centre of Bolsheshadinsky Selsoviet, Mishkinsky District, Bashkortostan, Russia. The population was 533 as of 2010. There are 9 streets.

== Geography ==
Bolshiye Shady is located 26 km northwest of Mishkino (the district's administrative centre) by road. Ishtybayevo is the nearest rural locality.
