= Novoakbulatovo =

Village in Mishkinsky District, Bashkortostan, Russia

Novoakbulatovo Новоакбулатово
- Village
- Location within Bashkortostan Location within Russia
- Coordinates: 55°26′N 55°58′E
- Country: Russia
- Region: Bashkortostan
- District: Mishkinsky District
- Time zone: UTC+5:00

Novoakbulatovo (Russian: Новоакбулатово; Bashkir: Яңы Аҡбулат, Yañı Aqbulat; Meadow Mari: Кӱрзӧ, Kürzö) is a rural locality (a village) and the administrative centre of Akbulatovsky Selsoviet, Mishkinsky District, Bashkortostan, Russia. The population was 514 as of 2010. There are 6 streets.

== Geography ==
Novoakbulatovo is located 10 km south of Mishkino (the district's administrative centre) by road. Yandyganovo is the nearest rural locality.
