= Staronakaryakovo =

Selo in Mishkinsky District, Bashkortostan, Russia

Staronakaryakovo Старонакаряково
- Selo
- Location within Bashkortostan Location within Russia
- Coordinates: 55°36′N 56°11′E
- Country: Russia
- Region: Bashkortostan
- District: Mishkinsky District
- Time zone: UTC+5:00

Staronakaryakovo (Russian: Старонакаряково; Bashkir: Иҫке Нәкәрәк, İśke Näkäräk) is a rural locality (a selo) in Staroarzamatovsky Selsoviet, Mishkinsky District, Bashkortostan, Russia. The population was 50 as of 2010. There are 2 streets.

== Geography ==
Staronakaryakovo is located 26 km northeast of Mishkino (the district's administrative centre) by road. Malonakaryakovo is the nearest rural locality.
