= Levitsky, Mishkinsky District, Republic of Bashkortostan =

Village in Mishkinsky District, Bashkortostan, Russia

Levitsky Левицкий
- Village
- Location within Bashkortostan Location within Russia
- Coordinates: 55°41′N 55°37′E
- Country: Russia
- Region: Bashkortostan
- District: Mishkinsky District
- Time zone: UTC+5:00

Levitsky (Russian: Левицкий) is a rural locality (a village) in Baymurzinsky Selsoviet, Mishkinsky District, Bashkortostan, Russia. The population was 24 as of 2010. There is 1 street.

== Geography ==
Levitsky is located 53 km northwest of Mishkino (the district's administrative centre) by road. Baymurzino is the nearest rural locality.
