= Mitryayevo =

Village in Mishkinsky District, Bashkortostan, Russia

Mitryayevo Митряево
- Village
- Location within Bashkortostan Location within Russia
- Coordinates: 55°34′N 55°57′E
- Country: Russia
- Region: Bashkortostan
- District: Mishkinsky District
- Time zone: UTC+5:00

Mitryayevo (Russian: Митряево; Bashkir: Митрәй, Miträy) is a rural locality (a village) in Irsayevsky Selsoviet, Mishkinsky District, Bashkortostan, Russia. The population was 254 as of 2010. There are 5 streets.

== Geography ==
Mitryayevo is located 6 km north of Mishkino (the district's administrative centre) by road. Irsayevo is the nearest rural locality.
