= Mayevka, Mishkinsky District, Republic of Bashkortostan =

Village in Mishkinsky District, Bashkortostan, Russia

Mayevka Маевка
- Village
- Location within Bashkortostan Location within Russia
- Coordinates: 55°38′N 55°32′E
- Country: Russia
- Region: Bashkortostan
- District: Mishkinsky District
- Time zone: UTC+5:00

Mayevka (Russian: Маевка) is a rural locality (a village) in Churayevsky Selsoviet, Mishkinsky District, Bashkortostan, Russia. The population was 49 as of 2010. There is 1 street.

== Geography ==
Mayevka is located 46 km northwest of Mishkino (the district's administrative centre) by road. Novokilmetovo is the nearest rural locality.
