= Arslanbekovo =

Arslanbekovo Арсланбеково
- Village
- Location within Bashkortostan Location within Russia
- Coordinates: 55°38′N 55°16′E
- Country: Russia
- Region: Bashkortostan
- District: Burayevsky District
- Time zone: UTC+5:00

Arslanbekovo (Russian: Арсланбеково; Bashkir: Арыҫланбәк, Arışlanbäk) is a rural locality (a village) in Vostretsovsky Selsoviet, Burayevsky District, Bashkortostan, Russia. The population was 83 as of 2010. There is 1 street.

== Geography ==
Arslanbekovo is located 31 km southwest of Burayevo (the district's administrative centre) by road. Kreshchenka is the nearest rural locality.
