= Kushmanakovo =

Kushmanakovo Кушманаково
- Village
- Location within Bashkortostan Location within Russia
- Coordinates: 55°48′N 55°15′E
- Country: Russia
- Region: Bashkortostan
- District: Burayevsky District
- Time zone: UTC+5:00

Kushmanakovo (Russian: Кушманаково; Bashkir: Ҡушманак, Quşmanak) is a rural locality (a village) and the administrative centre of Kushmanakovsky Selsoviet, Burayevsky District, Bashkortostan, Russia. The population was 367 as of 2010. There are 8 streets.

== Geography ==
Kushmanakovo is located 12 km southwest of Burayevo (the district's administrative centre) by road. Karatamak is the nearest rural locality.
