= Kam-Klyuch =

Kam-Klyuch Кам-Ключ
- Village
- Location within Bashkortostan Location within Russia
- Coordinates: 56°04′N 55°32′E
- Country: Russia
- Region: Bashkortostan
- District: Burayevsky District
- Time zone: UTC+5:00

Kam-Klyuch (Russian: Кам-Ключ) is a rural locality (a village) in Teplyakovsky Selsoviet, Burayevsky District, Bashkortostan, Russia. The population was 4 as of 2010. It has 1 street.

== Geography ==
Kam-Klyuch is located 28 km north of Burayevo (the district's administrative centre) by road. Sarsaz is the nearest rural locality.
