= Starokizganovo =

Starokizganovo Старокизганово
- Village
- Location within Bashkortostan Location within Russia
- Coordinates: 55°54′N 55°41′E
- Country: Russia
- Region: Bashkortostan
- District: Burayevsky District
- Time zone: UTC+5:00

Starokizganovo (Russian: Старокизганово; Bashkir: Иҫке Киҙгән, İśke Kiźgän) is a rural locality (a village) in Tazlarovsky Selsoviet, Burayevsky District, Bashkortostan, Russia. The population was 157 as of 2010. There are six streets.

== Geography ==
Starokizganovo is located 26 km northeast of Burayevo (the district's administrative centre) by road. Novokizganovo is the nearest rural locality.
