= Kuzbayevo =

Kuzbayevo Кузбаево
- Village
- Location within Bashkortostan Location within Russia
- Coordinates: 55°54′N 55°18′E
- Country: Russia
- Region: Bashkortostan
- District: Burayevsky District
- Time zone: UTC+5:00

Kuzbayevo (Russian: Кузбаево; Bashkir: Ҡуҙбай, Quźbay) is a rural locality (a village) in Kuzbayevsky Selsoviet, Burayevsky District, Bashkortostan, Russia. The population was 394 as of 2010. There are 8 streets.

== Geography ==
Kuzbayevo is located 12 km northwest of Burayevo (the district's administrative centre) by road. Altayevo is the nearest rural locality.
