= Sumsabashevo =

Sumsabashevo Сумсабашево
- Village
- Location within Bashkortostan Location within Russia
- Coordinates: 55°59′N 55°22′E
- Country: Russia
- Region: Bashkortostan
- District: Burayevsky District
- Time zone: UTC+5:00

Sumsabashevo (Russian: Сумсабашево; Bashkir: Сумсабаш, Sumsabaş) is a rural locality (a village) in Vanyshevsky Selsoviet, Burayevsky District, Bashkortostan, Russia. The population was 2 as of 2010. There is 1 street.

== Geography ==
Sumsabashevo is located 36 km north of Burayevo (the district's administrative centre) by road. Novoyashevo is the nearest rural locality.
