= Chishma-Burayevo =

Chishma-Burayevo Чишма-Бураево
- Village
- Location within Bashkortostan Location within Russia
- Coordinates: 55°51′N 55°31′E
- Country: Russia
- Region: Bashkortostan
- District: Burayevsky District
- Time zone: UTC+5:00

Chishma-Burayevo (Russian: Чишма-Бураево; Bashkir: Шишмә-Борай, Şişmä-Boray) is a rural locality (a village) in Tazlarovsky Selsoviet, Burayevsky District, Bashkortostan, Russia. The population was 140 as of 2010. There are seven streets.

== Geography ==
Chishma-Burayevo is located 17 km northeast of Burayevo (the district's administrative centre) by road. Novotazlarovo is the nearest rural locality.
