= Saitbayevo =

Saitbayevo Саитбаево
- Village
- Location within Bashkortostan Location within Russia
- Coordinates: 55°46′N 55°07′E
- Country: Russia
- Region: Bashkortostan
- District: Burayevsky District
- Time zone: UTC+5:00

Saitbayevo (Russian: Саитбаево; Bashkir: Сәйетбай, Säyetbay) is a rural locality (a village) in Kainlykovsky Selsoviet, Burayevsky District, Bashkortostan, Russia. The population was 282 as of 2010. There are 3 streets.

== Geography ==
Saitbayevo is located 21 km southwest of Burayevo (the district's administrative centre) by road. Kainlykovo is the nearest rural locality.
