= Verkhnesorokino =

Village in Mishkinsky District, Bashkortostan, Russia

Verkhnesorokino Верхнесорокино
- Village
- Location within Bashkortostan Location within Russia
- Coordinates: 55°35′N 55°54′E
- Country: Russia
- Region: Bashkortostan
- District: Mishkinsky District
- Time zone: UTC+5:00

Verkhnesorokino (Russian: Верхнесорокино) is a rural locality (a village) in Irsayevsky Selsoviet, Mishkinsky District, Bashkortostan, Russia. The population was 412 as of 2010. There are four streets in Verkhnesorokino.

== Geography ==
Verkhnesorokino is located 9 km northwest of Mishkino (the district's administrative centre) by road. Nizhnesorokino is the nearest rural locality.
