= Yumakayevo =

Yumakayevo Юмакаево
- Village
- Location within Bashkortostan Location within Russia
- Coordinates: 55°55′N 55°36′E
- Country: Russia
- Region: Bashkortostan
- District: Burayevsky District
- Time zone: UTC+5:00

Yumakayevo (Russian: Юмакаево; Bashkir: Йомаҡай, Yomaqay) is a rural locality (a village) in Vanyshevsky Selsoviet, Burayevsky District, Bashkortostan, Russia. The population was 205 as of 2010. There are 4 streets.

== Geography ==
Yumakayevo is located 25 km northeast of Burayevo (the district's administrative centre) by road. Varzitamak is the nearest rural locality.
