= Baysakino =

Baysakino Байсакино
- Village
- Location within Bashkortostan Location within Russia
- Coordinates: 55°57′N 55°27′E
- Country: Russia
- Region: Bashkortostan
- District: Burayevsky District
- Time zone: UTC+5:00

Baysakino (Russian: Байсакино; Bashkir: Байсаҡа, Baysaqa) is a rural locality (a village) in Vanyshevsky Selsoviet, Burayevsky District, Bashkortostan, Russia. The population was 54 as of 2010. There are 3 streets.

== Geography ==
Baysakino is located 16 km north of Burayevo (the district's administrative centre) by road. Vanysh-Alpautovo is the nearest rural locality.
