= Kamelevo =

Kamelevo Камелево
- Village
- Location within Bashkortostan Location within Russia
- Coordinates: 55°33′N 55°14′E
- Country: Russia
- Region: Bashkortostan
- District: Burayevsky District
- Time zone: UTC+5:00

Kamelevo (Russian: Камелево; Bashkir: Кәмил, Kämil) is a rural locality (a village) in Vostretsovsky Selsoviet, Burayevsky District, Bashkortostan, Russia. The population was 66 as of 2010. There is 1 street.

== Geography ==
Kamelevo is located 45 km southwest of Burayevo (the district's administrative centre) by road. Novoyeldyakovo is the nearest rural locality.
