= Abzaevo, Burayevsky District, Bashkortostan =

Abzaevo Абзаево Абзай
- Village
- Location within Bashkortostan Location within Russia
- Coordinates: 55°48′N 55°09′E
- Country: Russia
- Region: Bashkortostan
- District: Burayevsky District
- Time zone: [[UTC+5:00]]

Abzaevo (Russian: Абзаево, Bashkir: Абзай, Abzay) is a rural locality (a village) in Kushmanakovsky Selsoviet of Burayevsky District, Bashkortostan, Russia. The population was 156 as of 2010. There are 5 streets.

== Geography ==
Abzaevo is located 17 km west of Burayevo (the district's administrative centre) by road. Karatamak is the nearest rural locality.

== Ethnicity ==
The village is inhabited by Bashkirs and others.
