= Staromustafino =

Staromustafino Старомустафино
- Village
- Location within Bashkortostan Location within Russia
- Coordinates: 55°48′N 55°30′E
- Country: Russia
- Region: Bashkortostan
- District: Burayevsky District
- Time zone: UTC+5:00

Staromustafino (Russian: Старомустафино; Bashkir: Иҫке Мостафа, İśke Mostafa) is a rural locality (a village) in Azyakovsky Selsoviet, Burayevsky District, Bashkortostan, Russia. The population was 45 as of 2010. There is 1 street.

== Geography ==
Staromustafino is located 11 km southeast of Burayevo (the district's administrative centre) by road. Utyaganovo is the nearest rural locality.
