= Kadrikovo =

Kadrikovo Кадриково
- Village
- Location within Bashkortostan Location within Russia
- Coordinates: 55°46′N 54°53′E
- Country: Russia
- Region: Bashkortostan
- District: Burayevsky District
- Time zone: UTC+5:00

Kadrikovo (Russian: Кадриково; Bashkir: Ҡаҙырыҡ, Qaźırıq) is a rural locality (a village) in Tangatarovsky Selsoviet, Burayevsky District, Bashkortostan, Russia. The population was 7 as of 2010. There is one street.

== Geography ==
Kadrikovo is located 36 km west of Burayevo (the district's administrative centre) by road. Votkurzya is the nearest rural locality.
