= Ardashevo =

Ardashevo Ардашево
- Village
- Location within Bashkortostan Location within Russia
- Coordinates: 56°02′N 55°35′E
- Country: Russia
- Region: Bashkortostan
- District: Burayevsky District
- Time zone: UTC+5:00

Ardashevo (Russian: Ардашево; Bashkir: Әрҙәш, Ärźäş) is a rural locality (a village) in Teplyakovsky Selsoviet, Burayevsky District, Bashkortostan, Russia. The population was 55 as of 2010. There is 1 street.

== Geography ==
Ardashevo is located 31 km northeast of Burayevo (the district's administrative centre) by road. Taztuba is the nearest rural locality.
