= Silosovo =

Silosovo Силосово
- Village
- Location within Bashkortostan Location within Russia
- Coordinates: 55°41′N 55°18′E
- Country: Russia
- Region: Bashkortostan
- District: Burayevsky District
- Time zone: UTC+5:00

Silosovo (Russian: Силосово; Bashkir: Силасау, Silisaw) is a rural locality (a village) in Badrakovsky Selsoviet, Burayevsky District, Bashkortostan, Russia. The population was 284 as of 2010. There are 5 streets.

== Geography ==
Silosovo is located 24 km southwest of Burayevo (the district's administrative centre) by road. Bolshebadrakovo is the nearest rural locality.
