= Varzitamak =

Varzitamak Варзитамак
- Village
- Location within Bashkortostan Location within Russia
- Coordinates: 55°55′N 55°32′E
- Country: Russia
- Region: Bashkortostan
- District: Burayevsky District
- Time zone: UTC+5:00

Varzitamak (Russian: Варзитамак; Bashkir: Варзитамаҡ, Warzitamaq) is a rural locality (a village) in Vanyshevsky Selsoviet, Burayevsky District, Bashkortostan, Russia. The population was 91 as of 2010. There is 1 street.

== Geography ==
Varzitamak is located 21 km northeast of Burayevo (the district's administrative centre) by road. Bolsheshukshanovo is the nearest rural locality.
