= Bikzyan =

Bikzyan Бикзян
- Village
- Location within Bashkortostan Location within Russia
- Coordinates: 55°51′N 55°23′E
- Country: Russia
- Region: Bashkortostan
- District: Burayevsky District
- Time zone: UTC+5:00

Bikzyan (Russian: Бикзян; Bashkir: Бикйән, Bikyän) is a rural locality (a village) in Burayevsky Selsoviet, Burayevsky District, Bashkortostan, Russia. The population was 183 as of 2010. There are w streets.

== Geography ==
Bikzyan is located 3 km north of Burayevo (the district's administrative centre) by road. Burayevo is the nearest rural locality.
