= Karazirikovo =

Karazirikovo Каразириково
- Village
- Location within Bashkortostan Location within Russia
- Coordinates: 55°55′N 55°28′E
- Country: Russia
- Region: Bashkortostan
- District: Burayevsky District
- Time zone: UTC+5:00

Karazirikovo (Russian: Каразириково; Bashkir: Ҡараерек, Qarayerek) is a rural locality (a village) in Vanyshevsky Selsoviet, Burayevsky District, Bashkortostan, Russia. The population was 89 as of 2010. There are 3 streets.

== Geography ==
Karazirikovo is located 15 km northeast of Burayevo (the district's administrative centre) by road. Vanysh-Alpautovo is the nearest rural locality.
