= Taztuba =

Taztuba Тазтуба
- Village
- Location within Bashkortostan Location within Russia
- Coordinates: 56°01′N 55°37′E
- Country: Russia
- Region: Bashkortostan
- District: Burayevsky District
- Time zone: UTC+5:00

Taztuba (Russian: Тазтуба; Bashkir: Таҙтүбә, Taźtübä) is a rural locality (a village) in Teplyakovsky Selsoviet, Burayevsky District, Bashkortostan, Russia. The population was 12 as of 2010. There is 1 street.

== Geography ==
Taztuba is located 30 km northeast of Burayevo (the district's administrative centre) by road. Ardashevo is the nearest rural locality.
