= Uleyevo, Burayevsky District, Republic of Bashkortostan =

Uleyevo Улеево
- Village
- Location within Bashkortostan Location within Russia
- Coordinates: 55°43′N 55°14′E
- Country: Russia
- Region: Bashkortostan
- District: Burayevsky District
- Time zone: UTC+5:00

Uleyevo (Russian: Улеево; Bashkir: Үләй, Üläy) is a rural locality (a village) in Badrakovsky Selsoviet, Burayevsky District, Bashkortostan, Russia. The population was 137 in 2010. There are two streets.

== Geography ==
Uleyevo is located 19 km southwest of Burayevo (the district's administrative centre) by road. Berlyachevo is the nearest rural locality.
