= Dyusmetovo =

Dyusmetovo Дюсметово
- Village
- Location within Bashkortostan Location within Russia
- Coordinates: 55°52′N 55°27′E
- Country: Russia
- Region: Bashkortostan
- District: Burayevsky District
- Time zone: UTC+5:00

Dyusmetovo (Russian: Дюсметово; Bashkir: Дүсмәт, Düsmät) is a rural locality (a village) in Burayevsky Selsoviet, Burayevsky District, Bashkortostan, Russia. The population was 96 as of 2010. There are 3 streets.

== Geography ==
Dyusmetovo is located 6 km northeast of Burayevo (the district's administrative centre) by road. Burayevo is the nearest rural locality.
