= Kasiyarovo =

Kasiyarovo Касиярово
- Village
- Location within Bashkortostan Location within Russia
- Coordinates: 55°53′N 55°36′E
- Country: Russia
- Region: Bashkortostan
- District: Burayevsky District
- Time zone: UTC+5:00

Kasiyarovo (Russian: Касиярово; Bashkir: Ҡасияр, Qasiyar) is a rural locality (a village) in Tazlarovsky Selsoviet, Burayevsky District, Bashkortostan, Russia. The population was 191 as of 2010. There are six streets.

== Geography ==
Kasiyarovo is located 22 km northeast of Burayevo (the district's administrative centre) by road. Starotazlarovo is the nearest rural locality.
