= Aitovo, Burayevsky District, Republic of Bashkortostan =

Aitovo Аитово
- Village
- Location within Bashkortostan Location within Russia
- Coordinates: 55°49′37″N 54°58′56″E
- Country: Russia
- Region: Bashkortostan
- District: Burayevsky District
- Time zone: UTC+5:00

Aitovo (Russian: Аитово; Bashkir: Айыт, Ayıt) is a rural locality (a village) in Tangatarovsky Selsoviet, Burayevsky District, Bashkortostan, Russia. The population was 58 as of 2010. There is one street.

== Geography ==
Aitovo is located 39 km west of Burayevo (the district's administrative centre) by road. Sait-Kurzya is the nearest rural locality.
