= Novovaskino =

Village in Mishkinsky District, Bashkortostan, Russia

Novovaskino Нововаськино
- Village
- Location within Bashkortostan Location within Russia
- Coordinates: 55°31′N 56°00′E
- Country: Russia
- Region: Bashkortostan
- District: Mishkinsky District
- Time zone: UTC+5:00

Novovaskino (Russian: Нововаськино) is a rural locality (a village) in Mishkinsky Selsoviet, Mishkinsky District, Bashkortostan, Russia. The population was 172 as of 2010. There are 7 streets.

== Geography ==
Novovaskino is located 5 km east of Mishkino (the district's administrative centre) by road. Mishkino is the nearest rural locality.
