= Novoyeldyakovo =

Novoyeldyakovo Новоельдяково
- Selo
- Location within Bashkortostan Location within Russia
- Coordinates: 55°33′N 55°14′E
- Country: Russia
- Region: Bashkortostan
- District: Burayevsky District
- Time zone: UTC+5:00

Novoyeldyakovo (Russian: Новоельдяково; Bashkir: Яңы Йәлдәк, Yañı Yäldäk) is a rural locality (a selo) in Vostretsovsky Selsoviet, Burayevsky District, Bashkortostan, Russia. The population was 308 in 2010. There are four streets.

== Geography ==
Novoyeldyakovo is located 44 km southwest of Burayevo (the district's administrative centre) by road. Kamelevo is the nearest rural locality.
