= Azyakovo =

Azyakovo Азяково
- Village
- Location within Bashkortostan Location within Russia
- Coordinates: 55°45′N 55°30′E
- Country: Russia
- Region: Bashkortostan
- District: Burayevsky District
- Time zone: UTC+5:00

Azyakovo (Russian: Азяково; Bashkir: Әжәк, Äjäk) is a rural locality (a village) and the administrative centre of Azyakovsky Selsoviet, Burayevsky District, Bashkortostan, Russia. The population was 267 as of 2010. There are 5 streets.

== Geography ==
Azyakovo is located 14 km southeast of Burayevo (the district's administrative centre) by road. Mullino is the nearest rural locality.
