= Starokurzya =

Starokurzya Старокурзя
- Village
- Location within Bashkortostan Location within Russia
- Coordinates: 55°48′N 55°02′E
- Country: Russia
- Region: Bashkortostan
- District: Burayevsky District
- Time zone: UTC+5:00

Starokurzya (Russian: Старокурзя; Bashkir: Иҫке Көрйә, İśke Köryä) is a rural locality (a village) in Tangatarovsky Selsoviet, Burayevsky District, Bashkortostan, Russia. The population was 147 as of 2010. There are two streets.

== Geography ==
Starokurzya is located 41 km southwest of Burayevo (the district's administrative centre) by road. Sait-Kurzya is the nearest rural locality.
