= Sulzibash =

Sulzibash Сульзибаш
- Village
- Location within Bashkortostan Location within Russia
- Coordinates: 55°42′N 55°31′E
- Country: Russia
- Region: Bashkortostan
- District: Burayevsky District
- Time zone: UTC+5:00

Sulzibash (Russian: Сульзибаш; Bashkir: Сүлйебаш, Sülyebaş) is a rural locality (a village) in Azyakovsky Selsoviet, Burayevsky District, Bashkortostan, Russia. The population was 31 as of 2010. There is 1 street.

== Geography ==
Sulzibash is located 24 km southeast of Burayevo (the district's administrative centre) by road. Novomustafino is the nearest rural locality.
