= Starotukranovo =

Starotukranovo Старотукраново
- Village
- Location within Bashkortostan Location within Russia
- Coordinates: 55°43′N 55°22′E
- Country: Russia
- Region: Bashkortostan
- District: Burayevsky District
- Time zone: UTC+5:00

Starotukranovo (Russian: Старотукраново; Bashkir: Иҫке Туҡран, İśke Tuqran) is a rural locality (a village) in Badrakovsky Selsoviet, Burayevsky District, Bashkortostan, Russia. The population was 173 as of 2010. There are 6 streets.

== Geography ==
Starotukranovo is located 18 km south of Burayevo (the district's administrative centre) by road. Starobikmetovo is the nearest rural locality.
