= Chelkakovo =

Chelkakovo Челкаково
- Selo
- Location within Bashkortostan Location within Russia
- Coordinates: 55°41′N 55°03′E
- Country: Russia
- Region: Bashkortostan
- District: Burayevsky District
- Time zone: UTC+5:00

Chelkakovo (Russian: Челкаково; Bashkir: Салҡаҡ, Salqaq) is a rural locality (a selo) and the administrative centre of Chelkakovsky Selsoviet, Burayevsky District, Bashkortostan, Russia. The population was 754 as of 2010. There are 12 streets.

== Geography ==
Chelkakovo is located 40 km southwest of Burayevo (the district's administrative centre) by road. Novobikmetovo is the nearest rural locality.
