= Toktarovo =

Village in Mishkinsky District, Bashkortostan, Russia

Toktarovo Токтарово
- Village
- Location within Bashkortostan Location within Russia
- Coordinates: 55°35′N 55°22′E
- Country: Russia
- Region: Bashkortostan
- District: Mishkinsky District
- Time zone: UTC+5:00

Toktarovo (Russian: Токтарово; Bashkir: Туҡтар, Tuqtar) is a rural locality (a village) in Tynbayevsky Selsoviet, Mishkinsky District, Bashkortostan, Russia. The population was 162 as of 2010. There are 5 streets.

== Geography ==
Toktarovo is located 53 km northwest of Mishkino (the district's administrative centre) by road. Izimarino is the nearest rural locality.
