= Davlekanovo, Burayevsky District, Republic of Bashkortostan =

Davlekanovo Давлеканово
- Village
- Location within Bashkortostan Location within Russia
- Coordinates: 55°45′N 54°54′E
- Country: Russia
- Region: Bashkortostan
- District: Burayevsky District
- Time zone: UTC+5:00

Davlekanovo (Russian: Давлеканово; Bashkir: Дәүләкән, Däwläkän) is a rural locality (a village) in Tangatarovsky Selsoviet, Burayevsky District, Bashkortostan, Russia. The population was 26 as of 2010. There is one street.

== Geography ==
Davlekanovo is located 38 km southwest of Burayevo (the district's administrative centre) by road. Novoshilikovo is the nearest rural locality.
