= Yandyganovo =

Village in Mishkinsky District, Bashkortostan, Russia

Yandyganovo Яндыганово
- Village
- Location within Bashkortostan Location within Russia
- Coordinates: 55°24′N 55°58′E
- Country: Russia
- Region: Bashkortostan
- District: Mishkinsky District
- Time zone: UTC+5:00

Yandyganovo (Russian: Яндыганово; Bashkir: Яндуған, Yanduğan) is a rural locality (a village) in Akbulatovsky Selsoviet, Mishkinsky District, Bashkortostan, Russia. The population was 391 as of 2010. There are 7 streets.

== Geography ==
Yandyganovo is located 14 km south of Mishkino (the district's administrative centre) by road. Kochkildino is the nearest rural locality.
