= Novoshilikovo =

Novoshilikovo Новошиликово
- Village
- Location within Bashkortostan Location within Russia
- Coordinates: 55°45′N 55°53′E
- Country: Russia
- Region: Bashkortostan
- District: Burayevsky District
- Time zone: UTC+5:00

Novoshilikovo (Russian: Новошиликово; Bashkir: Яңы Шилек, Yañı Şilek) is a rural locality (a village) in Tangatarovsky Selsoviet, Burayevsky District, Bashkortostan, Russia. The population was 46 as of 2010. There is one street.

== Geography ==
Novoshilikovo is located 38 km southwest of Burayevo (the district's administrative centre) by road. Davlekanovo is the nearest rural locality.
