= Sarsaz =

Sarsaz Сарсаз
- Village
- Location within Bashkortostan Location within Russia
- Coordinates: 56°03′N 55°35′E
- Country: Russia
- Region: Bashkortostan
- District: Burayevsky District
- Time zone: UTC+5:00

Sarsaz (Russian: Сарсаз; Bashkir: Һарыһаҙ, Harıhaź) is a rural locality (a village) in Teplyakovsky Selsoviet, Burayevsky District, Bashkortostan, Russia. The population was 46 as of 2010. There is 1 street.

== Geography ==
Sarsaz is located 33 km north of Burayevo (the district's administrative centre) by road. Bayshady is the nearest rural locality.
