= Votkurzya =

Votkurzya Воткурзя
- Village
- Location within Bashkortostan Location within Russia
- Coordinates: 55°46′N 54°54′E
- Country: Russia
- Region: Bashkortostan
- District: Burayevsky District
- Time zone: UTC+5:00

Votkurzya (Russian: Воткурзя; Bashkir: Воткөрйә, Wotköryä) is a rural locality (a village) in Tangatarovsky Selsoviet, Burayevsky District, Bashkortostan, Russia. The population was 30 as of 2010. There is one street.

== Geography ==
Votkurzya is located 36 km southwest of Burayevo (the district's administrative centre) by road. Kadrikovo is the nearest rural locality.
