= Tugayevo, Burayevsky District, Republic of Bashkortostan =

Tugayevo Тугаево
- Village
- Location within Bashkortostan Location within Russia
- Coordinates: 55°50′N 55°20′E
- Country: Russia
- Region: Bashkortostan
- District: Burayevsky District
- Time zone: UTC+5:00

Tugayevo (Russian: Тугаево; Bashkir: Туғай, Tuğay) is a rural locality (a village) in Kushmanakovsky Selsoviet, Burayevsky District, Bashkortostan, Russia. The population was 229 as of 2010. There are 8 streets.

== Geography ==
Tugayevo is located 6 km west of Burayevo (the district's administrative centre) by road. Kudashevo is the nearest rural locality.
