= Sarmashevo =

Sarmashevo Сармашево
- Village
- Location within Bashkortostan Location within Russia
- Coordinates: 55°35′N 55°19′E
- Country: Russia
- Region: Bashkortostan
- District: Burayevsky District
- Time zone: UTC+5:00

Sarmashevo (Russian: Сармашево; Bashkir: Сармаш, Sarmaş) is a rural locality (a village) in Vostretsovsky Selsoviet, Burayevsky District, Bashkortostan, Russia. The population was 11 as of 2010. There are 2 streets.

== Geography ==
Sarmashevo is located 47 km south of Burayevo (the district's administrative centre) by road. Toktarovo is the nearest rural locality.
