= Abdrashbash =

Abdrashbash Абдрашбаш Әбдрәшбаш Äbdräşbaş
- Village
- Location within Bashkortostan Location within Russia
- Coordinates: 55°43′N 55°27′E
- Country: Russia
- Region: Bashkortostan
- District: Burayevsky District
- Time zone: [[UTC+5:00]]

Abdrashbash (Russian: Абдрашбаш; Bashkir: Әбдрәшбаш, Äbdräşbaş) is a rural locality (a village) in Azyakovsky Selsoviet of Burayevsky District, Bashkortostan, Russia. Its population is 88 as of 2010.

== Geography ==
Abdrashbash is located 16 km south of Burayevo (the district's administrative centre) by road. Mullino is the nearest rural locality.

== Ethnicity ==
The village is inhabited by Tatars and others.
