= Bustanayevo =

Bustanayevo Бустанаево
- Village
- Location within Bashkortostan Location within Russia
- Coordinates: 55°56′N 55°15′E
- Country: Russia
- Region: Bashkortostan
- District: Burayevsky District
- Time zone: UTC+5:00

Bustanayevo (Russian: Бустанаево; Bashkir: Боҫтанай, Bośtanay) is a rural locality (a village) in Kuzbayevsky Selsoviet, Burayevsky District, Bashkortostan, Russia. The population was 156 as of 2010. There are five streets.

== Geography ==
Bustanayevo is located 16 km northwest of Burayevo (the district's administrative centre) by road. Abdullino is the nearest rural locality.
