= Ishmametovo =

Ishmametovo Ишмаметово
- Village
- Location within Bashkortostan Location within Russia
- Coordinates: 55°48′N 55°46′E
- Country: Russia
- Region: Bashkortostan
- District: Burayevsky District
- Time zone: UTC+5:00

Ishmametovo (Russian: Ишмаметово; Bashkir: Ишмәмәт, İşmämät) is a rural locality (a village) in Kashkalevsky Selsoviet, Burayevsky District, Bashkortostan, Russia. The population was 149 as of 2010. There are 3 streets.

== Geography ==
Ishmametovo is located 29 km east of Burayevo (the district's administrative centre) by road. Kashkalevo is the nearest rural locality.
