= Starobikmetovo =

Starobikmetovo Старобикметово
- Village
- Location within Bashkortostan Location within Russia
- Coordinates: 55°44′N 55°21′E
- Country: Russia
- Region: Bashkortostan
- District: Burayevsky District
- Time zone: UTC+5:00

Starobikmetovo (Russian: Старобикметово; Bashkir: Иҫке Бикмәт, İśke Bikmät) is a rural locality (a village) in Badrakovsky Selsoviet, Burayevsky District, Bashkortostan, Russia. The population was 328 as of 2010. There are 6 streets.

== Geography ==
Starobikmetovo is located 16 km southwest of Burayevo (the district's administrative centre) by road. Starotukranovo is the nearest rural locality.
