= Naryshevo =

Naryshevo Нарышево
- Village
- Location within Bashkortostan Location within Russia
- Coordinates: 55°40′N 55°23′E
- Country: Russia
- Region: Bashkortostan
- District: Burayevsky District
- Time zone: UTC+5:00

Naryshevo (Russian: Нарышево; Bashkir: Нарыш, Narış) is a rural locality (a village) in Badrakovsky Selsoviet, Burayevsky District, Bashkortostan, Russia. The population was 106 as of 2010. There are 3 streets.

== Geography ==
Naryshevo is located 25 km south of Burayevo (the district's administrative centre) by road. Starobikmetovo is the nearest rural locality.
