= Maloshukshanovo =

Maloshukshanovo Малошукшаново
- Village
- Location within Bashkortostan Location within Russia
- Coordinates: 55°58′N 55°32′E
- Country: Russia
- Region: Bashkortostan
- District: Burayevsky District
- Time zone: UTC+5:00

Maloshukshanovo (Russian: Малошукшаново; Bashkir: Бәләкәй Шуҡшан, Bäläkäy Şuqşan) is a rural locality (a village) in Vanyshevsky Selsoviet, Burayevsky District, Bashkortostan, Russia. The population was 42 as of 2010. There is 1 street.

== Geography ==
Maloshukshanovo is located 21 km northeast of Burayevo (the district's administrative centre) by road. Asavtamak is the nearest rural locality.
