= Aldarovo, Burayevsky District, Republic of Bashkortostan =

Aldarovo Алдарово
- Village
- Location within Bashkortostan Location within Russia
- Coordinates: 55°44′N 55°33′E
- Country: Russia
- Region: Bashkortostan
- District: Burayevsky District
- Time zone: UTC+5:00

Aldarovo (Russian: Алдарово; Bashkir: Алдар, Aldar) is a rural locality (a village) in Azyakovsky Selsoviet, Burayevsky District, Bashkortostan, Russia. The population was 66 as of 2010. There are 2 streets.

== Geography ==
Aldarovo is located 18 km southeast of Burayevo (the district's administrative centre) by road. Ilikovo is the nearest rural locality.
