= Starovaskino =

Village in Mishkinsky District, Bashkortostan, Russia

Starovaskino Староваськино
- Village
- Location within Bashkortostan Location within Russia
- Coordinates: 55°30′N 55°58′E
- Country: Russia
- Region: Bashkortostan
- District: Mishkinsky District
- Time zone: UTC+5:00

Starovaskino (Russian: Староваськино) is a rural locality (a village) in Mishkinsky Selsoviet, Mishkinsky District, Bashkortostan, Russia. The population was 529 as of 2010. There are 7 streets.

== Geography ==
Starovaskino is located 3 km south of Mishkino (the district's administrative centre) by road. Mishkino is the nearest rural locality.
