= Starokaragushevo =

Starokaragushevo Старокарагушево
- Village
- Location within Bashkortostan Location within Russia
- Coordinates: 55°44′N 55°47′E
- Country: Russia
- Region: Bashkortostan
- District: Burayevsky District
- Time zone: UTC+5:00

Starokaragushevo (Russian: Старокарагушево; Bashkir: Иҫке Ҡарағош, İśke Qarağoş) is a rural locality (a village) in Kashkalevsky Selsoviet, Burayevsky District, Bashkortostan, Russia. The population was 291 as of 2010. There are 8 streets.

== Geography ==
Starokaragushevo is located 34 km southeast of Burayevo (the district's administrative centre) by road. Kizganbashevo is the nearest rural locality.
