= Novokizganovo =

Novokizganovo Новокизганово
- Village
- Location within Bashkortostan Location within Russia
- Coordinates: 55°53′N 55°41′E
- Country: Russia
- Region: Bashkortostan
- District: Burayevsky District
- Time zone: UTC+5:00

Novokizganovo (Russian: Новокизганово; Bashkir: Яңы Киҙгән, Yañı Kiźgän) is a rural locality (a village) in Tazlarovsky Selsoviet, Burayevsky District, Bashkortostan, Russia. The population was 491 as of 2010. There are 12 streets.

== Geography ==
Novokizganovo is located 23 km northeast of Burayevo (the district's administrative centre) by road. Starokizganovo is the nearest rural locality.
