= Tangatarovo =

Tangatarovo Тангатарово
- Village
- Location within Bashkortostan Location within Russia
- Coordinates: 55°47′N 54°57′E
- Country: Russia
- Region: Bashkortostan
- District: Burayevsky District
- Time zone: UTC+5:00

Tangatarovo (Russian: Тангатарово; Bashkir: Таңатар, Tañatar) is a rural locality (a village) and the administrative centre of Tangatarovsky Selsoviet, Burayevsky District, Bashkortostan, Russia. The population was 421 as of 2010. There are four streets.

== Geography ==
Tangatarovo is located 33 km southwest of Burayevo (the district's administrative centre) by road. Votkurzya is the nearest rural locality.
