= Kalmazan =

Village in Mishkinsky District, Bashkortostan, Russia

Kalmazan Калмазан
- Village
- Location within Bashkortostan Location within Russia
- Coordinates: 55°36′N 55°46′E
- Country: Russia
- Region: Bashkortostan
- District: Mishkinsky District

Population (2010)
  - Total: 87
- Time zone: UTC+5:00

Kalmazan (Russian: Калмазан; Bashkir: Ҡалмаҙан, Qalmaźan) is a rural locality (a village) in Bolsheshadinsky Selsoviet, Mishkinsky District, Bashkortostan, Russia. The population was 87 as of 2010. There is 1 street.

== Geography ==
Kalmazan is located 22 km northwest of Mishkino (the district's administrative centre) by road. Malyye Shady is the nearest rural locality.
