= Ilikovo, Mishkinsky District, Republic of Bashkortostan =

Village in Mishkinsky District, Bashkortostan, Russia

Ilikovo Иликово
- Village
- Location within Bashkortostan Location within Russia
- Coordinates: 55°43′N 55°36′E
- Country: Russia
- Region: Bashkortostan
- District: Mishkinsky District
- Time zone: UTC+5:00

Ilikovo (Russian: Иликово; Bashkir: Илек, İlek) is a rural locality (a village) in Baymurzinsky Selsoviet, Mishkinsky District, Bashkortostan, Russia. The population was 156 as of 2010. There are 2 streets.

== Geography ==
Ilikovo is located 56 km northwest of Mishkino (the district's administrative centre) by road. Ishimovo is the nearest rural locality.
