= Novosafarovo =

Village in Mishkinsky District, Bashkortostan, Russia

Novosafarovo Новосафарово
- Village
- Location within Bashkortostan Location within Russia
- Coordinates: 55°22′N 55°59′E
- Country: Russia
- Region: Bashkortostan
- District: Mishkinsky District
- Time zone: UTC+5:00

Novosafarovo (Russian: Новосафарово; Bashkir: Яңы Сафар, Yañı Safar) is a rural locality (a village) in Uryadinsky Selsoviet, Mishkinsky District, Bashkortostan, Russia.

The population was 21 as of 2010.

There are 4 streets.

== Geography ==
Novosafarovo is located 29 km south of Mishkino (the district's administrative centre) by road. Yanagushevo is the nearest rural locality.
