= Baymurzino, Mechetlinsky District, Republic of Bashkortostan =

Village in Mishkinsky District, Bashkortostan, Russia

Baymurzino Баймурзино
- Village
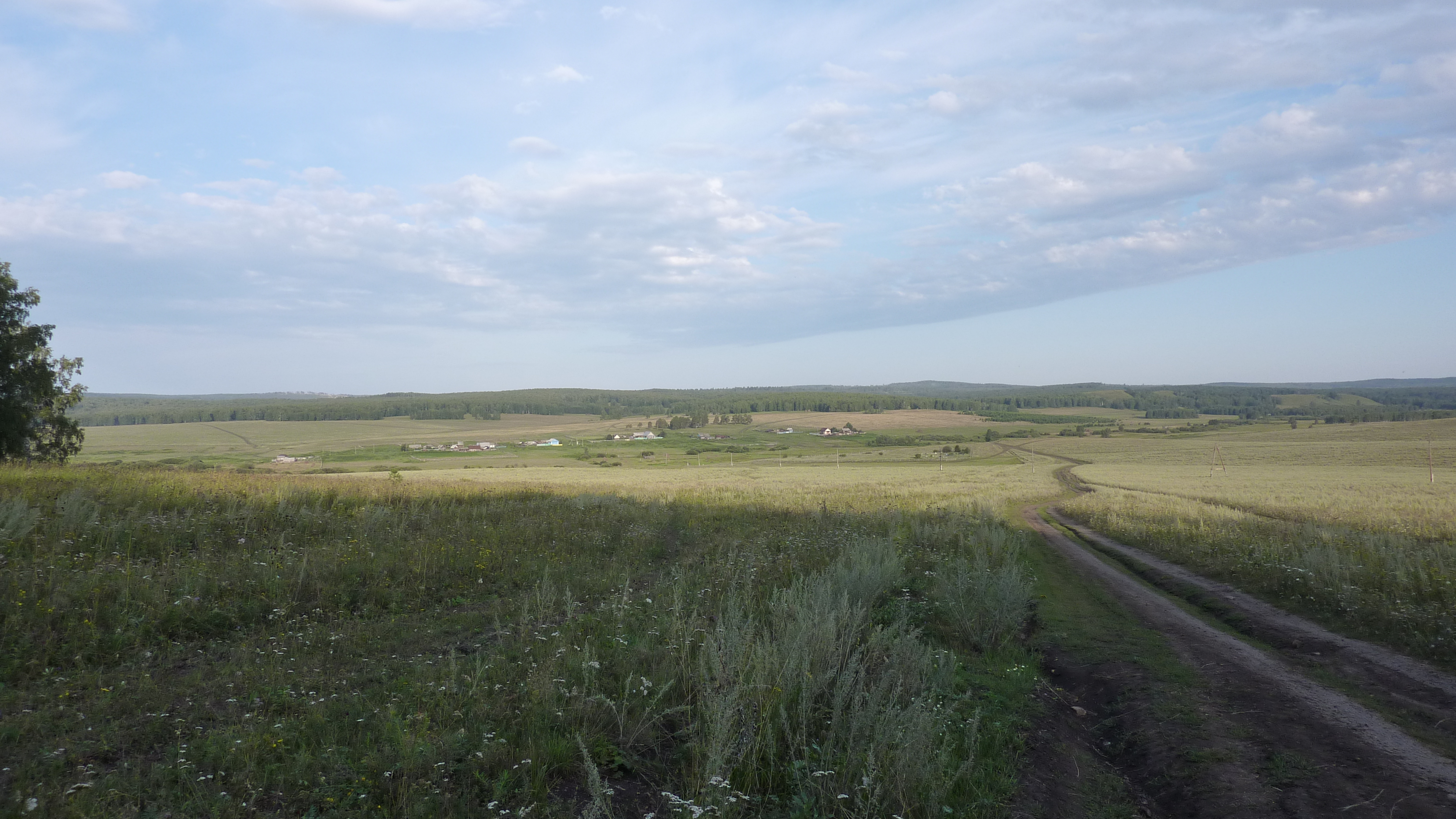

- Location within Bashkortostan Location within Russia
- Coordinates: 55°40′N 55°36′E
- Country: Russia
- Region: Bashkortostan
- District: Mishkinsky District
- Time zone: UTC+5:00

Baymurzino (Russian: Баймурзино; Bashkir: Баймырҙа, Baymırźa; Meadow Mari: Ардаш, Ardaš) is a rural locality (a village) and the administrative centre of Baymurzinsky Selsoviet, Mishkinsky District, Bashkortostan, Russia. The population was 587 as of 2010. There are 11 streets.

== Geography ==
Baymurzino is located 49 km northwest of Mishkino (the district's administrative centre) by road. Buklendy is the nearest rural locality.
