= Kreshchenka =

Kreshchenka Крещенка
- Village
- Location within Bashkortostan Location within Russia
- Coordinates: 55°37′N 55°14′E
- Country: Russia
- Region: Bashkortostan
- District: Burayevsky District
- Time zone: UTC+5:00

Kreshchenka (Russian: Крещенка) is a rural locality (a village) in Vostretsovsky Selsoviet, Burayevsky District, Bashkortostan, Russia. The population was 5 as of 2010. There is 1 street.

== Geography ==
Kreshchenka is located 28 km southwest of Burayevo (the district's administrative centre) by road. Arslanbekovo is the nearest rural locality.
