= Biginyayevo =

Biginyayevo Бигиняево
- Village
- Location within Bashkortostan Location within Russia
- Coordinates: 55°45′N 55°08′E
- Country: Russia
- Region: Bashkortostan
- District: Burayevsky District
- Time zone: UTC+5:00

Biginyayevo (Russian: Бигиняево; Bashkir: Бигәнәй, Bigänäy) is a rural locality (a village) in Kainlykovsky Selsoviet, Burayevsky District, Bashkortostan, Russia. The population was 183 as of 2010. There are 3 streets.

== Geography ==
Biginyayevo is located 22 km southwest of Burayevo (the district's administrative centre) by road. Kainlykovo is the nearest rural locality.
