= Starotazlarovo =

Starotazlarovo Старотазларово
- Village
- Location within Bashkortostan Location within Russia
- Coordinates: 55°51′N 55°37′E
- Country: Russia
- Region: Bashkortostan
- District: Burayevsky District
- Time zone: UTC+5:00

Starotazlarovo (Russian: Старотазларово; Bashkir: Иҫке Таҙлар, İśke Taźlar) is a rural locality (a village) in Tazlarovsky Selsoviet, Burayevsky District, Bashkortostan, Russia. The population was 221 as of 2010. There are five streets.

== Geography ==
Starotazlarovo is located 18 km east of Burayevo (the district's administrative centre) by road. Kasiyarovo is the nearest rural locality.
