= Lenin-Bulyak =

Lenin-Bulyak Ленин-Буляк
- Village
- Location within Bashkortostan Location within Russia
- Coordinates: 55°42′N 55°42′E
- Country: Russia
- Region: Bashkortostan
- District: Burayevsky District
- Time zone: UTC+5:00

Lenin-Bulyak (Russian: Ленин-Буляк; Bashkir: Ленин-Бүләк, Lenin-Büläk) is a rural locality (a village) in Kashkalevsky Selsoviet, Burayevsky District, Bashkortostan, Russia. The population was 4 as of 2010. There is 1 street.

== Geography ==
Lenin-Bulyak is located 39 km southeast of Burayevo (the district's administrative centre) by road. Kyzyl-Yul is the nearest rural locality.
