= Utyaganovo, Burayevsky District, Republic of Bashkortostan =

Utyaganovo Утяганово
- Village
- Location within Bashkortostan Location within Russia
- Coordinates: 55°50′N 55°32′E
- Country: Russia
- Region: Bashkortostan
- District: Burayevsky District
- Time zone: UTC+5:00

Utyaganovo (Russian: Утяганово; Bashkir: Үтәгән, Ütägän) is a rural locality (a village) in Tazlarovsky Selsoviet, Burayevsky District, Bashkortostan, Russia. The population was 135 as of 2010. There are five streets.

== Geography ==
Utyaganovo is located 11 km east of Burayevo (the district's administrative centre) by road. Novotazlarovo is the nearest rural locality.
