= Kutliyarovo =

Kutliyarovo Кутлиярово
- Village
- Location within Bashkortostan Location within Russia
- Coordinates: 55°57′N 55°33′E
- Country: Russia
- Region: Bashkortostan
- District: Burayevsky District
- Time zone: UTC+5:00

Kutliyarovo (Russian: Кутлиярово; Bashkir: Ҡотлояр, Qotloyar) is a rural locality (a village) in Vanyshevsky Selsoviet, Burayevsky District, Bashkortostan, Russia. The population was 65 as of 2010. There is 1 street.

== Geography ==
Kutliyarovo is 21 km (13 mi) northeast of Burayevo (the district's administrative centre) by road. Bolsheshukshanovo is the nearest rural locality.
