= Shabayevo =

Shabayevo Шабаево
- Village
- Location within Bashkortostan Location within Russia
- Coordinates: 55°47′N 55°21′E
- Country: Russia
- Region: Bashkortostan
- District: Burayevsky District
- Time zone: UTC+5:00

Shabayevo (Russian: Шабаево; Bashkir: Шабай, Şabay) is a rural locality (a village) in Burayevsky Selsoviet, Burayevsky District, Bashkortostan, Russia. The population was 273 as of 2010. There are 3 streets.

== Geography ==
Shabayevo is located 7 km southwest of Burayevo (the district's administrative centre) by road. Shunyakovo is the nearest rural locality.
