= Malobadrakovo =

Malobadrakovo Малобадраково
- Village
- Location within Bashkortostan Location within Russia
- Coordinates: 55°40′N 55°15′E
- Country: Russia
- Region: Bashkortostan
- District: Burayevsky District
- Time zone: UTC+5:00

Malobadrakovo (Russian: Малобадраково; Bashkir: Бәләкәй Баҙраҡ, Bäläkäy Baźraq) is a rural locality (a village) in Badrakovsky Selsoviet, Burayevsky District, Bashkortostan, Russia. The population was 225 as of 2010. There are 4 streets.

== Geography ==
Malobadrakovo is located 22 km southwest of Burayevo (the district's administrative centre) by road. Bolshebadrakovo is the nearest rural locality.
