= Dautlarovo =

Dautlarovo Даутларово
- Village
- Location within Bashkortostan Location within Russia
- Coordinates: 55°46′N 55°42′E
- Country: Russia
- Region: Bashkortostan
- District: Burayevsky District
- Time zone: UTC+5:00

Dautlarovo (Russian: Даутларово; Bashkir: Дауытлар, Dawıtlar) is a rural locality (a village) in Kashkalevsky Selsoviet, Burayevsky District, Bashkortostan, Russia. The population was 220 as of 2010. There are 8 streets.

== Geography ==
Dautlarovo is located 30 km southeast of Burayevo (the district's administrative centre) by road. Kashkalevo is the nearest rural locality.
