= Oktyabr, Mishkinsky District, Republic of Bashkortostan =

Village in Mishkinsky District, Bashkortostan, Russia

Oktyabr Октябрь
- Village
- Location within Bashkortostan Location within Russia
- Coordinates: 55°36′N 55°37′E
- Country: Russia
- Region: Bashkortostan
- District: Mishkinsky District
- Time zone: UTC+5:00

Oktyabr (Russian: Октябрь) is a rural locality (a village) in Churayevsky Selsoviet, Mishkinsky District, Bashkortostan, Russia. The population was 151 as of 2010. There is 1 street.

== Geography ==
Oktyabr is located 44 km northwest of Mishkino (the district's administrative centre) by road. Churayevo is the nearest rural locality.
