= Mullino =

Mullino Муллино
- Village
- Location within Bashkortostan Location within Russia
- Coordinates: 55°45′N 55°26′E
- Country: Russia
- Region: Bashkortostan
- District: Burayevsky District
- Time zone: UTC+5:00

Mullino (Russian: Муллино; Bashkir: Мулла, Mulla) is a rural locality (a village) in Azyakovsky Selsoviet, Burayevsky District, Bashkortostan, Russia. The population was 336 as of 2010. There are 6 streets.

== Geography ==
Mullino is located 13 km southeast of Burayevo (the district's administrative centre) by road. Azyakovo is the nearest rural locality.
