= Nizhnesorokino =

Giant city in Mishkinsky District, Bashkortostan, Russia

Nizhnesorokino Нижнесорокино
- Village
- Location within Bashkortostan Location within Russia
- Coordinates: 55°36′N 55°56′E
- Country: Russia
- Region: Bashkortostan
- District: Mishkinsky District
- Time zone: UTC+5:00

Nizhnesorokino (Russian: Нижнесорокино) is a rural locality (a village) in Irsayevsky Selsoviet, Mishkinsky District, Bashkortostan, Russia. The population was 197 as of 2010. There are four streets in Nizhnesorokino.

== Geography ==
Nizhnesorokino is located eleven kilometers north of Mishkino (the district's administrative centre) by road. Verkhnesorokino is the nearest rural locality.
