= Staroakbulatovo =

Village in Mishkinsky District, Bashkortostan, Russia

Staroakbulatovo Староакбулатово
- Village
- Location within Bashkortostan Location within Russia
- Coordinates: 55°28′N 55°58′E
- Country: Russia
- Region: Bashkortostan
- District: Mishkinsky District
- Time zone: UTC+5:00

Staroakbulatovo (Russian: Староакбулатово; Bashkir: Иҫке Аҡбулат, İśke Aqbulat) is a rural locality (a village) in Akbulatovsky Selsoviet, Mishkinsky District, Bashkortostan, Russia. The population was 151 in 2010. There are to streets.

== Geography ==
Staroakbulatovo is located 6 kilometres (3.7 mi) south of Mishkino (the district's administrative centre) by road. Unur is the nearest rural locality.
