= Bayshady =

Bayshady Байшады
- Village
- Location within Bashkortostan Location within Russia
- Coordinates: 56°04′N 55°36′E
- Country: Russia
- Region: Bashkortostan
- District: Burayevsky District
- Time zone: UTC+5:00

Bayshady (Russian: Байшады; Bashkir: Байшаҙы, Bayşaźı) is a rural locality (a village) in Teplyakovsky Selsoviet, Burayevsky District, Bashkortostan, Russia. The population was 135 as of 2010. There are 2 streets.

== Geography ==
Bayshady is located 35 km north of Burayevo (the district's administrative centre) by road. Sarsaz is the nearest rural locality.
