= Tugaryakovo =

Tugaryakovo Тугаряково
- Village
- Location within Bashkortostan Location within Russia
- Coordinates: 55°46′N 55°00′E
- Country: Russia
- Region: Bashkortostan
- District: Burayevsky District
- Time zone: UTC+5:00

Tugaryakovo (Russian: Тугаряково; Bashkir: Түгәрәк, Tügäräk) is a rural locality (a village) in Chelkakovsky Selsoviet, Burayevsky District, Bashkortostan, Russia. The population was 106 as of 2010. There are 2 streets.

== Geography ==
Tugaryakovo is located 29 km southwest of Burayevo (the district's administrative centre) by road. Novoaltybayevo is the nearest rural locality.
