= Novobikmetovo =

Novobikmetovo Новобикметово
- Village
- Location within Bashkortostan Location within Russia
- Coordinates: 55°39′N 55°07′E
- Country: Russia
- Region: Bashkortostan
- District: Burayevsky District
- Time zone: UTC+5:00

Novobikmetovo (Russian: Новобикметово; Bashkir: Яңы Бикмәт, Yañı Bikmät) is a rural locality (a village) in Vostretsovsky Selsoviet, Burayevsky District, Bashkortostan, Russia. The population was 425 as of 2010. There are seven streets.

== Geography ==
Novobikmetovo is located 34 km southwest of Burayevo (the district's administrative centre) by road. Chelkakovo is the nearest rural locality.
