= Altayevo =

Altayevo Алтаево
- Village
- Location within Bashkortostan Location within Russia
- Coordinates: 55°56′N 55°21′E
- Country: Russia
- Region: Bashkortostan
- District: Burayevsky District
- Time zone: UTC+5:00

Altayevo (Russian: Алтаево; Bashkir: Алтайыу, Altayıw) is a rural locality (a village) in Kuzbayevsky Selsoviet, Burayevsky District, Bashkortostan, Russia. The population was 261 as of 2010. There are 2 streets.

== Geography ==
Altayevo is located 18 km north of Burayevo (the district's administrative centre) by road. Vanysh-Alpautovo is the nearest rural locality.
