= Bash-Baybakovo =

Village in Mishkinsky District, Bashkortostan, Russia

Bash-Baybakovo Баш-Байбаково
- Village
- Location within Bashkortostan Location within Russia
- Coordinates: 55°26′N 56°04′E
- Country: Russia
- Region: Bashkortostan
- District: Mishkinsky District
- Time zone: UTC+5:00

Bash-Baybakovo (Russian: Баш-Байбаково; Bashkir: Баш-Байбаҡ, Baş-Baybaq) is a rural locality (a village) in Uryadinsky Selsoviet, Mishkinsky District, Bashkortostan, Russia. The population was 58 as of 2010. There are 2 streets.

== Geography ==
Bash-Baybakovo is located 16 km southeast of Mishkino (the district's administrative centre) by road. Russkoye Baybakovo is the nearest rural locality.
