= Novonikolayevka, Mishkinsky District, Republic of Bashkortostan =

Village in Mishkinsky District, Bashkortostan, Russia

Novonikolayevka Новониколаевка
- Village
- Location within Bashkortostan Location within Russia
- Coordinates: 55°37′N 55°26′E
- Country: Russia
- Region: Bashkortostan
- District: Mishkinsky District
- Time zone: UTC+5:00

Novonikolayevka (Russian: Новониколаевка) is a rural locality (a village) in Tynbayevsky Selsoviet, Mishkinsky District, Bashkortostan, Russia. The population was 154 as of 2010. There are 3 streets.

== Geography ==
Novonikolayevka is located 51 km northwest of Mishkino (the district's administrative centre) by road. Tynbayevo is the nearest rural locality.
