= Sait-Kurzya =

Sait-Kurzya Саит-Курзя
- Village
- Location within Bashkortostan Location within Russia
- Coordinates: 55°49′N 55°01′E
- Country: Russia
- Region: Bashkortostan
- District: Burayevsky District
- Time zone: UTC+5:00

Sait-Kurzya (Russian: Саит-Курзя; Bashkir: Сәйет-Көрйә, Säyet-Köryä) is a rural locality (a village) in Tangatarovsky Selsoviet, Burayevsky District, Bashkortostan, Russia. The population was 137 as of 2010. There are three streets.

== Geography ==
Sait-Kurzya is located 40 km west of Burayevo (the district's administrative centre) by road. Starokurzya is the nearest rural locality.
