= Novoaltybayevo =

Novoaltybayevo Новоалтыбаево
- Village
- Location within Bashkortostan Location within Russia
- Coordinates: 55°46′N 55°00′E
- Country: Russia
- Region: Bashkortostan
- District: Burayevsky District
- Time zone: UTC+5:00

Novoaltybayevo (Russian: Новоалтыбаево; Bashkir: Яңы Алтыбай, Yañı Altıbay) is a rural locality (a village) in Chelkakovsky Selsoviet, Burayevsky District, Bashkortostan, Russia. The population was 66 as of 2010. There is 1 street.

== Geography ==
Novoaltybayevo is located 29 km southwest of Burayevo (the district's administrative centre) by road. Tugaryakovo is the nearest rural locality.
