= Irsayevo =

Village in Mishkinsky District, Bashkortostan, Russia

Irsayevo Ирсаево
- Village
- Location within Bashkortostan Location within Russia
- Coordinates: 55°33′N 55°57′E
- Country: Russia
- Region: Bashkortostan
- District: Mishkinsky District
- Time zone: UTC+5:00

Irsayevo (Russian: Ирсаево; Bashkir: Ирсай, İrsay) is a rural locality (a village) and the administrative centre of Irsayevsky Selsoviet, Mishkinsky District, Bashkortostan, Russia. The population was 531 as of 2010. There are 7 streets.

== Geography ==
Irsayevo is located 4 km north of Mishkino (the district's administrative centre) by road. Mitryayevo is the nearest rural locality.
