= Voskhod, Mishkinsky District, Republic of Bashkortostan =

Village in Mishkinsky District, Bashkortostan, Russia

Voskhod Восход
- Village
- Location within Bashkortostan Location within Russia
- Coordinates: 55°32′N 55°52′E
- Country: Russia
- Region: Bashkortostan
- District: Mishkinsky District
- Time zone: UTC+5:00

Voskhod (Russian: Восход) is a rural locality (a village) in Mishkinsky Selsoviet, Mishkinsky District, Bashkortostan, Russia. The population was 15 as of 2010. There is 1 street.

== Geography ==
Voskhod is located 11 km west of Mishkino (the district's administrative centre) by road. Leninskoye is the nearest rural locality.
