= Teplyaki =

Teplyaki Тепляки
- Selo
- Location within Bashkortostan Location within Russia
- Coordinates: 56°02′N 55°30′E
- Country: Russia
- Region: Bashkortostan
- District: Burayevsky District
- Time zone: UTC+5:00

Teplyaki (Russian: Тепляки) is a rural locality (a selo) and the administrative center of Teplyakovsky Selsoviet, Burayevsky District, Bashkortostan, Russia. The population was 269 as of 2010. There are 5 streets.

== Geography ==
Teplyaki is located 28 km north of Burayevo (the district's administrative centre) by road. Asavtamak is the nearest rural locality.
