= Vanysh-Alpautovo =

Vanysh-Alpautovo Ваныш-Алпаутово
- Village
- Location within Bashkortostan Location within Russia
- Coordinates: 55°56′N 55°25′E
- Country: Russia
- Region: Bashkortostan
- District: Burayevsky District
- Time zone: UTC+5:00

Vanysh-Alpautovo (Russian: Ваныш-Алпаутово; Bashkir: Ваныш-Алпауыт, Wanış-Alpawıt) is a rural locality (a village) and the administrative centre of Vanyshevsky Selsoviet, Burayevsky District, Bashkortostan, Russia. The population was 446 as of 2010. There are 5 streets.

== Geography ==
Vanysh-Alpautovo is located 14 km north of Burayevo (the district's administrative centre) by road. Baysakino is the nearest rural locality.
