= Karatamak =

Karatamak Каратамак
- Village
- Location within Bashkortostan Location within Russia
- Coordinates: 55°49′N 55°12′E
- Country: Russia
- Region: Bashkortostan
- District: Burayevsky District
- Time zone: UTC+5:00

Karatamak (Russian: Каратамак; Bashkir: Ҡаратамаҡ, Qaratamaq) is a rural locality (a village) in Kushmanakovsky Selsoviet, Burayevsky District, Bashkortostan, Russia. The population was 136 as of 2010.

== Geography ==
Karatamak is located 14 km west of Burayevo (the district's administrative centre) by road. Abzayevo is the nearest rural locality.
