= Sibirganovo =

Sibirganovo Сибирганово
- Village
- Location within Bashkortostan Location within Russia
- Coordinates: 55°46′N 55°17′E
- Country: Russia
- Region: Bashkortostan
- District: Burayevsky District
- Time zone: UTC+5:00

Sibirganovo (Russian: Сибирганово; Bashkir: Себергән, Sebergän) is a rural locality (a village) in Kainlykovsky Selsoviet, Burayevsky District, Bashkortostan, Russia. The population was 34 as of 2010. There is 1 street.

== Geography ==
Sibirganovo is located 10 km southwest of Burayevo (the district's administrative centre) by road. Kushmanakovo is the nearest rural locality.
