= Novokilmetovo =

Village in Mishkinsky District, Bashkortostan, Russia

Novokilmetovo Новокильметово
- Village
- Location within Bashkortostan Location within Russia
- Coordinates: 55°39′N 55°34′E
- Country: Russia
- Region: Bashkortostan
- District: Mishkinsky District
- Time zone: UTC+5:00

Novokilmetovo (Russian: Новокильметово; Bashkir: Яңы Килмәт, Yañı Kilmät) is a rural locality (a village) in Baymurzinsky Selsoviet, Mishkinsky District, Bashkortostan, Russia. The population was 151 as of 2010. There are 2 streets.

== Geography ==
Novokilmetovo is located 47 km northwest of Mishkino (the district's administrative centre) by road. Churayevo is the nearest rural locality.
