= Kashkalevo =

Kashkalevo Кашкалево
- Village
- Location within Bashkortostan Location within Russia
- Coordinates: 55°47′N 55°44′E
- Country: Russia
- Region: Bashkortostan
- District: Burayevsky District
- Time zone: UTC+5:00

Kashkalevo (Russian: Кашкалево; Bashkir: Кәшкәләү, Käşkäläw) is a rural locality (a village) and the administrative centre of Kashkalevsky Selsoviet, Burayevsky District, Bashkortostan, Russia. The population was 271 as of 2010. There are 6 streets.

== Geography ==
Kashkalevo is located 27 km southeast of Burayevo (the district's administrative centre) by road. Dautlarovo is the nearest rural locality.
