= Novotazlarovo =

Novotazlarovo Новотазларово
- Village
- Location within Bashkortostan Location within Russia
- Coordinates: 55°50′N 55°34′E
- Country: Russia
- Region: Bashkortostan
- District: Burayevsky District
- Time zone: UTC+5:00

Novotazlarovo (Russian: Новотазларово; Bashkir: Яңы Таҙлар, Yañı Taźlar) is a rural locality (a village) in Tazlarovsky Selsoviet, Burayevsky District, Bashkortostan, Russia. The population was 405 as of 2010. There are six streets.

== Geography ==
Novotazlarovo is located 14 km east of Burayevo (the district's administrative centre) by road. Utyaganovo is the nearest rural locality.
