= Karabayevo =

Karabayevo Карабаево
- Village
- Location within Bashkortostan Location within Russia
- Coordinates: 55°43′N 55°08′E
- Country: Russia
- Region: Bashkortostan
- District: Burayevsky District
- Time zone: UTC+5:00

Karabayevo (Russian: Карабаево; Bashkir: Ҡарабай, Qarabay) is a rural locality (a village) in Kainlykovsky Selsoviet, Burayevsky District, Bashkortostan, Russia. The population was 239 as of 2010. There are 2 streets.

== Geography ==
Karabayevo is located 25 km southwest of Burayevo (the district's administrative centre) by road. Biginyayevo is the nearest rural locality.
