= Minlino =

Minlino Минлино
- Village
- Location within Bashkortostan Location within Russia
- Coordinates: 55°59′N 55°26′E
- Country: Russia
- Region: Bashkortostan
- District: Burayevsky District
- Time zone: UTC+5:00

Minlino (Russian: Минлино; Bashkir: Меңле, Meñle) is a rural locality (a village) in Vanyshevsky Selsoviet, Burayevsky District, Bashkortostan, Russia. The population was 165 as of 2010. There are 4 streets.

== Geography ==
Minlino is located 20 km north of Burayevo (the district's administrative centre) by road. Asavtamak is the nearest rural locality.
