= Arnyashevo =

Arnyashevo Арняшево
- Village
- Location within Bashkortostan Location within Russia
- Coordinates: 56°00′N 55°35′E
- Country: Russia
- Region: Bashkortostan
- District: Burayevsky District
- Time zone: UTC+5:00

Arnyashevo (Russian: Арняшево; Bashkir: Әрнәш, Ärnäş) is a rural locality (a village) in Teplyakovsky Selsoviet, Burayevsky District, Bashkortostan, Russia. The population was 102 as of 2010. There are 3 streets.

== Geography ==
Arnyashevo is located 28 km northeast of Burayevo (the district's administrative centre) by road. Nikolayevka is the nearest rural locality.
