= Kudashevo =

Kudashevo Кудашево
- Village
- Location within Bashkortostan Location within Russia
- Coordinates: 55°51′N 55°16′E
- Country: Russia
- Region: Bashkortostan
- District: Burayevsky District
- Time zone: UTC+5:00

Kudashevo (Russian: Кудашево; Bashkir: Ҡоҙаш, Qoźaş) is a rural locality (a village) in Kushmanakovsky Selsoviet, Burayevsky District, Bashkortostan, Russia. The population was 409 as of 2010. There are 10 streets.

== Geography ==
Kudashevo is located 10 km west of Burayevo (the district's administrative centre) by road. Tugayevo is the nearest rural locality.
