= Tukayevo, Burayevsky District, Republic of Bashkortostan =

Tukayevo Тукаево
- Village
- Location within Bashkortostan Location within Russia
- Coordinates: 55°40′N 55°11′E
- Country: Russia
- Region: Bashkortostan
- District: Burayevsky District
- Time zone: UTC+5:00

Tukayevo (Russian: Тукаево; Bashkir: Туҡай, Tuqay) is a rural locality (a village) in Badrakovsky Selsoviet, Burayevsky District, Bashkortostan, Russia. The population was 101 as of 2010. There is 1 street.

== Geography ==
Tukayevo is located 25 km southwest of Burayevo (the district's administrative centre) by road. Bolshebadrakovo is the nearest rural locality.
