= Novomustafino, Burayevsky District, Republic of Bashkortostan =

Novomustafino Новомустафино
- Village
- Location within Bashkortostan Location within Russia
- Coordinates: 55°41′N 55°33′E
- Country: Russia
- Region: Bashkortostan
- District: Burayevsky District
- Time zone: UTC+5:00

Novomustafino (Russian: Новомустафино; Bashkir: Яңы Мостафа, Yañı Mostafa) is a rural locality (a village) in Azyakovsky Selsoviet, Burayevsky District, Bashkortostan, Russia. The population was 112 as of 2010. There are 2 streets.

== Geography ==
Novomustafino is located 22 km southeast of Burayevo (the district's administrative centre) by road. Sulzibash is the nearest rural locality.
