= Asavtamak =

Asavtamak Асавтамак
- Village
- Location within Bashkortostan Location within Russia
- Coordinates: 55°59′N 55°30′E
- Country: Russia
- Region: Bashkortostan
- District: Burayevsky District
- Time zone: UTC+5:00

Asavtamak (Russian: Асавтамак; Bashkir: Аҫаутамаҡ, Aśawtamaq) is a rural locality (a village) in Teplyakovsky Selsoviet, Burayevsky District, Bashkortostan, Russia. The population was 100 as of 2010. There are 3 streets.

== Geography ==
Asavtamak is located 25 km northeast of Burayevo (the district's administrative centre) by road. Maloshukshanovo is the nearest rural locality.
