= Staroarzamatovo =

Village in Mishkinsky District, Bashkortostan, Russia

Staroarzamatovo Староарзаматово
- Village
- Location within Bashkortostan Location within Russia
- Coordinates: 55°37′N 56°05′E
- Country: Russia
- Region: Bashkortostan
- District: Mishkinsky District
- Time zone: UTC+5:00

Staroarzamatovo (Russian: Староарзаматово; Bashkir: Иҫке Арзамат, İśke Arzamat; Meadow Mari: Тошто Арзамат, Tošto Arzamat) is a rural locality (a village) in Staroarzamatovsky Selsoviet, Mishkinsky District, Bashkortostan, Russia. The population was 570 as of 2010. There are six streets.

== Geography ==
Staroarzamatovo is located 15 km northeast of Mishkino (the district's administrative centre) by road. Malonakaryakovo is the nearest rural locality.
