= Tansyzarovo =

Tansyzarovo Тансызарово
- Village
- Location within Bashkortostan Location within Russia
- Coordinates: 55°44′N 54°57′E
- Country: Russia
- Region: Bashkortostan
- District: Burayevsky District
- Time zone: UTC+5:00

Tansyzarovo (Russian: Тансызарово; Bashkir: Таңһыҙар, Tañhıźar) is a rural locality (a village) in Tangatarovsky Selsoviet, Burayevsky District, Bashkortostan, Russia. The population was 55 as of 2010. There is one street.

== Geography ==
Tansyzarovo is located 35 km southwest of Burayevo (the district's administrative centre) by road. Khaziyevo is the nearest rural locality.
