= Berlyachevo =

Berlyachevo Берлячево
- Village
- Location within Bashkortostan Location within Russia
- Coordinates: 55°43′N 55°12′E
- Country: Russia
- Region: Bashkortostan
- District: Burayevsky District
- Time zone: UTC+5:00

Berlyachevo (Russian: Берлячево; Bashkir: Берләҫ, Berläś) is a rural locality (a village) in Badrakovsky Selsoviet, Burayevsky District, Bashkortostan, Russia. The population was 236 as of 2010. There are four streets.

== Geography ==
Berlyachevo is located 21 km southwest of Burayevo (the district's administrative centre) by road. Uleyevo is the nearest rural locality.
