= Bikshikovo =

Village in Mishkinsky District, Bashkortostan, Russia

Bikshikovo Бикшиково
- Village
- Location within Bashkortostan Location within Russia
- Coordinates: 55°31′N 55°41′E
- Country: Russia
- Region: Bashkortostan
- District: Mishkinsky District

Population (2010)
  - Total: 277
- Time zone: UTC+5:00

Bikshikovo (Russian: Бикшиково; Bashkir: Бикшик, Bikşik; Meadow Mari: Пекшек, Pekšek) is a rural locality (a village) in Kayrakovsky Selsoviet, Mishkinsky District, Bashkortostan, Russia. The population was 277 as of 2010. There are 5 streets.

== Geography ==
Bikshikovo is located 21 km west of Mishkino (the district's administrative centre) by road. Chebykovo is the nearest rural locality.
