= Bolsheshukshanovo =

Bolsheshukshanovo Большешукшаново
- Village
- Location within Bashkortostan Location within Russia
- Coordinates: 55°56′N 55°32′E
- Country: Russia
- Region: Bashkortostan
- District: Burayevsky District
- Time zone: UTC+5:00

Bolsheshukshanovo (Russian: Большешукшаново; Bashkir: Оло Шуҡшан, Olo Şuqşan) is a rural locality (a village) in Vanyshevsky Selsoviet, Burayevsky District, Bashkortostan, Russia. The population was 188 as of 2010. There are 3 streets.

== Geography ==
Bolsheshukshanovo is located 19 km northeast of Burayevo (the district's administrative centre) by road. Kutliyarovo is the nearest rural locality.
