= Kainlykovo =

Kainlykovo Каинлыково
- Village
- Location within Bashkortostan Location within Russia
- Coordinates: 55°46′N 55°08′E
- Country: Russia
- Region: Bashkortostan
- District: Burayevsky District
- Time zone: UTC+5:00

Kainlykovo (Russian: Каинлыково; Bashkir: Ҡайынлыҡ, Qayınlıq) is a rural locality (a village) and the administrative centre of Kainlykovsky Selsoviet, Burayevsky District, Bashkortostan, Russia. The population was 243 as of 2010. There are five streets.

== Geography ==
Kainlykovo is located 20 km southwest of Burayevo (the district's administrative centre) by road. Saitbayevo is the nearest rural locality.
