= Novyye Kargaly =

Novyye Kargaly Новые Каргалы
- Village
- Location within Bashkortostan Location within Russia
- Coordinates: 55°56′N 55°39′E
- Country: Russia
- Region: Bashkortostan
- District: Burayevsky District
- Time zone: UTC+5:00

Novyye Kargaly (Russian: Новые Каргалы; Bashkir: Яңы Ҡарғалы, Yañı Qarğalı) is a rural locality (a village) in Vanyshevsky Selsoviet, Burayevsky District, Bashkortostan, Russia. The population was 6 as of 2010. There is 1 street.

== Geography ==
Novyye Kargaly is located 51 km northeast of Burayevo (the district's administrative centre) by road. Starye Kargaly is the nearest rural locality.
