= Yanagushevo =

Selo in Mishkinsky District, Bashkortostan, Russia

Yanagushevo Янагушево
- Selo
- Location within Bashkortostan Location within Russia
- Coordinates: 55°22′N 56°02′E
- Country: Russia
- Region: Bashkortostan
- District: Mishkinsky District
- Time zone: UTC+5:00

Yanagushevo (Russian: Янагушево; Bashkir: Янағош, Yanağoş) is a rural locality (a selo) in Uryadinsky Selsoviet, Mishkinsky District, Bashkortostan, Russia. The population was 410 as of 2010. There are 11 streets.

== Geography ==
Yanagushevo is located 25 km south of Mishkino (the district's administrative centre) by road. Novosafarovo is the nearest rural locality.

== Famous natives ==
- Gazi Zagitov
