= Novokaragushevo =

Novokaragushevo Новокарагушево
- Village
- Location within Bashkortostan Location within Russia
- Coordinates: 55°43′N 55°43′E
- Country: Russia
- Region: Bashkortostan
- District: Burayevsky District
- Time zone: UTC+5:00

Novokaragushevo (Russian: Новокарагушево; Bashkir: Яңы Ҡарағош, Yañı Qarağoş) is a rural locality (a village) in Kashkalevsky Selsoviet, Burayevsky District, Bashkortostan, Russia. The population was 26 as of 2010. There are 2 streets.

== Geography ==
Novokaragushevo is located 39 km southeast of Burayevo (the district's administrative centre) by road. Lenin-Bulyak is the nearest rural locality.
