= Kochkildino =

Village in Mishkinsky District, Bashkortostan, Russia

Kochkildino Кочкильдино
- Village
- Location within Bashkortostan Location within Russia
- Coordinates: 55°24′N 56°01′E
- Country: Russia
- Region: Bashkortostan
- District: Mishkinsky District
- Time zone: UTC+5:00

Kochkildino (Russian: Кочкильдино; Bashkir: Күскилде, Küskilde) is a rural locality (a village) in Akbulatovsky Selsoviet, Mishkinsky District, Bashkortostan, Russia. The population was 3 as of 2010. There is 1 street.

== Geography ==
Kochkildino is located 18 km south of Mishkino (the district's administrative centre) by road. Sabayevo is the nearest rural locality.
