= Buklendy =

Village in Mishkinsky District, Bashkortostan, Russia

Buklendy Букленды
- Village
- Location within Bashkortostan Location within Russia
- Coordinates: 55°38′N 55°38′E
- Country: Russia
- Region: Bashkortostan
- District: Mishkinsky District
- Time zone: UTC+5:00

Buklendy (Russian: Букленды; Bashkir: Бөкләнде, Böklände) is a rural locality (a village) in Churayevsky Selsoviet, Mishkinsky District, Bashkortostan, Russia. The population was 307 as of 2010. There are 5 streets.

== Geography ==
Buklendy is located 47 km northwest of Mishkino (the district's administrative centre) by road. Baymurzino is the nearest rural locality.
