= Leninskoye, Mishkinsky District, Republic of Bashkortostan =

Selo in Mishkinsky District, Bashkortostan, Russia

Leninskoye Ленинское
- Selo
- Location within Bashkortostan Location within Russia
- Coordinates: 55°32′N 55°50′E
- Country: Russia
- Region: Bashkortostan
- District: Mishkinsky District
- Time zone: UTC+5:00

Leninskoye (Russian: Ленинское) is a rural locality (a selo) in Mishkinsky Selsoviet, Mishkinsky District, Bashkortostan, Russia. The population was 306 as of 2010. There are 7 streets.

== Geography ==
Leninskoye is located 10 km west of Mishkino (the district's administrative centre) by road. Voskhod is the nearest rural locality.
