= Staroatnagulovo =

Village in Mishkinsky District, Bashkortostan, Russia

Staroatnagulovo Староатнагулово
- Village
- Location within Bashkortostan Location within Russia
- Coordinates: 55°41′N 55°57′E
- Country: Russia
- Region: Bashkortostan
- District: Mishkinsky District
- Time zone: UTC+5:00

Staroatnagulovo (Russian: Староатнагулово; Bashkir: Иҫке Атнағол, İśke Atnağol) is a rural locality (a village) in Mavlyutovsky Selsoviet, Mishkinsky District, Bashkortostan, Russia. The population was 83 as of 2010. There are 5 streets.

== Geography ==
Staroatnagulovo is located 21 km north of Mishkino (the district's administrative centre) by road. Mavlyutovo is the nearest rural locality.
