= Ishtybayevo =

Village in Mishkinsky District, Bashkortostan, Russia

Ishtybayevo Иштыбаево
- Village
- Location within Bashkortostan Location within Russia
- Coordinates: 55°39′N 55°53′E
- Country: Russia
- Region: Bashkortostan
- District: Mishkinsky District
- Time zone: UTC+5:00

Ishtybayevo (Russian: Иштыбаево; Bashkir: Иштебай, İştebay) is a rural locality (a village) in Bolsheshadinsky Selsoviet, Mishkinsky District, Bashkortostan, Russia. The population was 295 as of 2010. There are 5 streets.

== Geography ==
Ishtybayevo is located 15 km north of Mishkino (the district's administrative centre) by road. Karasimovo is the nearest rural locality.
