= Karasimovo =

Village in Mishkinsky District, Bashkortostan, Russia

Karasimovo Карасимово
- Village
- Location within Bashkortostan Location within Russia
- Coordinates: 55°39′N 55°53′E
- Country: Russia
- Region: Bashkortostan
- District: Mishkinsky District
- Time zone: UTC+5:00

Karasimovo (Russian: Карасимово; Bashkir: Ҡарасим, Qarasim) is a rural locality (a village) in Bolsheshadinsky Selsoviet, Mishkinsky District, Bashkortostan, Russia. The population was 115 as of 2010. There are 3 streets.

== Geography ==
Karasimovo is located 17 km north of Mishkino (the district's administrative centre) by road. Ishtybayevo is the nearest rural locality.
