= Ishimovo, Mishkinsky District, Republic of Bashkortostan =

Village in Mishkinsky District, Bashkortostan, Russia

Ishimovo Ишимово
- Village
- Location within Bashkortostan Location within Russia
- Coordinates: 55°44′N 55°38′E
- Country: Russia
- Region: Bashkortostan
- District: Mishkinsky District
- Time zone: UTC+5:00

Ishimovo (Russian: Ишимово; Bashkir: Ишем, İşem; Meadow Mari: Эшым, Ešym) is a rural locality (a village) in Baymurzinsky Selsoviet, Mishkinsky District, Bashkortostan, Russia. The population was 193 as of 2010. There are 3 streets.

== Geography ==
Ishimovo is located 59 km northwest of Mishkino (the district's administrative centre) by road. Ilikovo is the nearest rural locality.
