= Mavlyutovo, Mishkinsky District, Republic of Bashkortostan =

Village in Mishkinsky District, Bashkortostan, Russia

Mavlyutovo Мавлютово
- Village
- Location within Bashkortostan Location within Russia
- Coordinates: 55°40′N 55°58′E
- Country: Russia
- Region: Bashkortostan
- District: Mishkinsky District
- Time zone: UTC+5:00

Mavlyutovo (Russian: Мавлютово; Bashkir: Мәүлит, Mäwlit) is a rural locality (a village) in Mavlyutovsky Selsoviet, Mishkinsky District, Bashkortostan, Russia. The population was 23 as of 2010. There are 2 streets.

== Geography ==
Mavlyutovo is located 19 km north of Mishkino (the district's administrative centre) by road. Staroatnagulovo is the nearest rural locality.
