= Chebykovo, Mishkinsky District, Republic of Bashkortostan =

Village in Mishkinsky District, Bashkortostan, Russia

Chebykovo Чебыково
- Village
- Location within Bashkortostan Location within Russia
- Coordinates: 55°31′N 55°43′E
- Country: Russia
- Region: Bashkortostan
- District: Mishkinsky District
- Time zone: UTC+5:00

Chebykovo (Russian: Чебыково; Bashkir: Сабыҡ, Sabıq; Meadow Mari: Нерге, Nerge) is a rural locality (a village) in Kayrakovsky Selsoviet, Mishkinsky District, Bashkortostan, Russia. The population was 495 as of 2010. There are 6 streets.

== Geography ==
Chebykovo is located 18 km west of Mishkino (the district's administrative centre) by road. Bikshikovo is the nearest rural locality.
