= Yelyshevo =

Village in Mishkinsky District, Bashkortostan, Russia

Yelyshevo Елышево
- Village
- Location within Bashkortostan Location within Russia
- Coordinates: 55°36′N 56°00′E
- Country: Russia
- Region: Bashkortostan
- District: Mishkinsky District
- Time zone: UTC+5:00

Yelyshevo (Russian: Елышево; Bashkir: Йылыш, Yılış) is a rural locality (a village) in Irsayevsky Selsoviet, Mishkinsky District, Bashkortostan, Russia. The population was 433 as of 2010. There are 6 streets.

== Geography ==
Yelyshevo is located 9 km north of Mishkino (the district's administrative centre) by road. Ozerki is the nearest rural locality.
