= Tynbayevo =

Village in Mishkinsky District, Bashkortostan, Russia

Tynbayevo Тынбаево
- Village
- Location within Bashkortostan Location within Russia
- Coordinates: 55°36′N 55°27′E
- Country: Russia
- Region: Bashkortostan
- District: Mishkinsky District
- Time zone: UTC+5:00

Tynbayevo (Russian: Тынбаево; Bashkir: Тымбай, Tımbay) is a rural locality (a village) and the administrative centre of Tynbayevsky Selsoviet, Mishkinsky District, Bashkortostan, Russia. The population was 397 as of 2010. There are 8 streets.

== Geography ==
Tynbayevo is located 47 km northwest of Mishkino (the district's administrative centre) by road. Izimarino is the nearest rural locality.
