= Malyye Shady =

Village in Mishkinsky District, Bashkortostan, Russia

Malyye Shady Малые Шады
- Village
- Location within Bashkortostan Location within Russia
- Coordinates: 55°36′N 55°48′E
- Country: Russia
- Region: Bashkortostan
- District: Mishkinsky District

Population (2010)
  - Total: 91
- Time zone: UTC+5:00

Malyye Shady (Russian: Малые Шады; Bashkir: Кесе Шаҙы, Kese Şaźı) is a rural locality (a village) in Bolsheshadinsky Selsoviet, Mishkinsky District, Bashkortostan, Russia. The population was 91 as of 2010. There is 1 street.

== Geography ==
Malyye Shady is located 19 km northwest of Mishkino (the district's administrative centre) by road. Kalmazan is the nearest rural locality.
