= Sabayevo, Mishkinsky District, Republic of Bashkortostan =

Village in Mishkinsky District, Bashkortostan, Russia

Sabayevo Сабаево
- Village
- Location within Bashkortostan Location within Russia
- Coordinates: 55°24′N 56°02′E
- Country: Russia
- Region: Bashkortostan
- District: Mishkinsky District
- Time zone: UTC+5:00

Sabayevo (Russian: Сабаево; Bashkir: Сабай, Sabay) is a rural locality (a village) in Uryadinsky Selsoviet, Mishkinsky District, Bashkortostan, Russia. The population was 216 as of 2010. There are 4 streets.

== Geography ==
Sabayevo is located 21 km south of Mishkino (the district's administrative centre) by road. Kochkildino is the nearest rural locality.
