= Yelenovka =

Yelenovka (Russian: Еленовка) may refer to:

- The former name of the city of Sevan, Armenia
- Former Yelenovka, Azerbaijan

== See also ==
- Olenivka
