= Ozerki, Mishkinsky District, Republic of Bashkortostan =

Village in Mishkinsky District, Bashkortostan, Russia

Ozerki Озерки
- Village
- Location within Bashkortostan Location within Russia
- Coordinates: 55°36′N 56°03′E
- Country: Russia
- Region: Bashkortostan
- District: Mishkinsky District
- Time zone: UTC+5:00

Ozerki (Russian: Озерки) is a rural locality (a village) in Staroarzamatovsky Selsoviet, Mishkinsky District, Bashkortostan, Russia. The population was 226 as of 2010. There are 2 streets.

== Geography ==
Ozerki is located 12 km northeast of Mishkino (the district's administrative centre) by road. Yelyshevo is the nearest rural locality.
