= Gazi Zagitov =

Soviet soldier

- Native name: Гази Казыханович Загитов
- Born: August 20, 1921; Yanagushevo, Mishkinsky District, Bashkortostan
- Died: August 23, 1953 (aged 32) Mishkinsky District, Bashkortostan
- Allegiance: Soviet Union
- Branch: Red Army
- Service years: 1941–1946
- Rank: Senior sergeant
- Conflicts: World War II; Eastern Front
- Other work: mechanic

Gazi Kazykhanovich Zagitov (August 20, 1921 — August 23, 1953) was a participant in the Great Patriotic War, on April 30, 1945, at 22:40, as part of an assault group under the command of Guard Captain V. N. Makov, he plant a Red Banner over the Reichstag building in Berlin. At the same time, Zagitov received a through wound to the chest, but continued the fight. Tatar by nationality.

== Biography ==
Gazi Zagitov was born on August 20, 1921, in the Tatar village of Yanagushevo, Mishkinsky district of the BASSR (USSR), drafted into the Red Army on October 19, 1940. His combat path led to Berlin, where he fought in the reconnaissance of the 136th Army Cannon Artillery Brigade of the 79th Rifle Corps of the 3rd Shock Army with the rank of sergeant.

On April 27, 1945, assault groups of volunteers were formed as part of the corps to capture the Reichstag and establish the Red Banner. One of them, consisting of 25 people, was headed by Captain V. N. Makov. The group acted together with the battalion of Captain S. A. Neustroev. By the evening of April 28, the troops crossed the Spree from the Moabit area over the Moltke Bridge (now Willy—Brandt-Strasse) and came out from the northwest side to the Reichstag. Zagitov, together with senior sergeants M. P. Minin, A. F. Lisimenko, Sergeant A. P. Bobrov from V. N. Makov's group, broke into the Reichstag building. Unnoticed by the enemy, they found a locked door and knocked it out with a log. Having climbed to the attic, through the dormer window they made their way to the roof over the western (front) gable of the building. They installed the banner in the opening of the crown of the sculpture of Victoria, the goddess of victory, that surmounts the Berlin Victory Column of the Reichstag building.

The group guarded the approaches to the Banner until 5 a.m. on May 1, after which, on the orders of General Perevertkin, it left the Reichstag.

On May 1, 1945, the command of the 136th Artillery Brigade presented the entire group to the highest government award - the title of Hero of the Soviet Union. However, on May 18, 1945, they were awarded the Order of the Red Banner.

After the war, Gazi Zagitov returned to his native village in Bashkiria, worked as a chairman of a collective farm and a mechanic at MTS. He was awarded many orders and medals, including the Red Star.

Gazi Zagitov died in a car accident on August 23, 1953.

== Awards ==
- Order of Glory II degree
- Order of Glory of the III degree
- Order of the Red Banner
- Order of the Red Star
- Medal "For Battle Merit"
- Medal "For Courage"
