= Churayevo, Mishkinsky District, Republic of Bashkortostan =

Selo in Mishkinsky District, Bashkortostan, Russia

Churayevo Чураево
- Selo
- Location within Bashkortostan Location within Russia
- Coordinates: 55°37′N 55°34′E
- Country: Russia
- Region: Bashkortostan
- District: Mishkinsky District
- Time zone: UTC+5:00

Churayevo (Russian: Чураево; Bashkir: Сурай, Suray; Meadow Mari: Чорай, Čoraj) is a rural locality (a selo) and the administrative centre of Churayevsky Selsoviet, Mishkinsky District, Bashkortostan, Russia. The population was 984 as of 2010. There are 9 streets.

== Geography ==
Churayevo is located 43 km northwest of Mishkino (the district's administrative centre) by road. Oktyabr is the nearest rural locality.
