= Izimarino =

Village in Mishkinsky District, Bashkortostan, Russia

Izimarino Изимарино
- Village
- Location within Bashkortostan Location within Russia
- Coordinates: 55°36′N 55°23′E
- Country: Russia
- Region: Bashkortostan
- District: Mishkinsky District
- Time zone: UTC+5:00

Izimarino (Russian: Изимарино; Bashkir: Изимари, İzimari) is a rural locality (a village) in Tynbayevsky Selsoviet, Mishkinsky District, Bashkortostan, Russia. The population was 312 as of 2010. There are 3 streets.

== Geography ==
Izimarino is located 52 km west of Mishkino (the district's administrative centre) by road. Toktarovo is the nearest rural locality.
