= Russkoye Baybakovo =

Village in Mishkinsky District, Bashkortostan, Russia

Russkoye Baybakovo Русское Байбаково
- Village
- Location within Bashkortostan Location within Russia
- Coordinates: 55°27′N 56°04′E
- Country: Russia
- Region: Bashkortostan
- District: Mishkinsky District
- Time zone: UTC+5:00

Russkoye Baybakovo (Russian: Русское Байбаково; Bashkir: Урыҫ-Байбаҡ, Urıś-Baybaq; Meadow Mari: Руш Байбак, Ruš Bajbak) is a rural locality (a village) in Kameyevsky Selsoviet, Mishkinsky District, Bashkortostan, Russia. The population was 107 as of 2010. There are 2 streets.

== Geography ==
Russkoye Baybakovo is located 15 km southeast of Mishkino (the district's administrative centre) by road. Bash-Baybakovo is the nearest rural locality.
