= Yekaterinovka, Belebeyevsky District, Republic of Bashkortostan =

Yekaterinovka Екатериновка
- Village
- Location within Bashkortostan Location within Russia
- Coordinates: 53°58′N 53°59′E
- Country: Russia
- Region: Bashkortostan
- District: Belebeyevsky District
- Time zone: UTC+5:00

Yekaterinovka (Russian: Екатериновка) is a rural locality (a village) in Bazhenovsky Selsoviet, Belebeyevsky District, Bashkortostan, Russia. The population was 122 as of 2010. There is 1 street.

== Geography ==
Yekaterinovka is located 18 km southwest of Belebey (the district's administrative centre) by road. Novonikolayevka is the nearest rural locality.
