= Novonikolayevka, Ishimbaysky District, Republic of Bashkortostan =

Novonikolayevka Новониколаевка
- Village
- Location within Bashkortostan Location within Russia
- Coordinates: 53°20′N 56°09′E
- Country: Russia
- Region: Bashkortostan
- District: Ishimbaysky District
- Time zone: UTC+5:00

Novonikolayevka (Russian: Новониколаевка) is a rural locality (a village) in Skvorchikhinsky Selsoviet, Ishimbaysky District, Bashkortostan, Russia. The population was 67 as of 2010. There are 11 streets.

== Geography ==
Novonikolayevka is located 22 km southeast of Ishimbay (the district's administrative centre) by road. Osipovka is the nearest rural locality.
