= Olenivka =

Olenivka (Ukrainian: Оленівка) is the name of several localities in Ukraine:

Urban-type settlements

- Olenivka, Kalmiuske Raion, Donetsk Oblast
- Olenivka, Horlivka Raion, Donetsk Oblast

Villages

- Olenivka, Podilsk Raion, village in Odesa Oblast
- Olenivka, Chornomorske Raion, village in Crimea

Events

- Olenivka prison massacre, explosion at a Russian-operated prison on 29 July 2022

== See also ==
- Yelenovka (disambiguation)
