= Malonakaryakovo =

Village in Mishkinsky District, Bashkortostan, Russia

Malonakaryakovo Малонакаряково
- Village
- Location within Bashkortostan Location within Russia
- Coordinates: 55°38′N 56°07′E
- Country: Russia
- Region: Bashkortostan
- District: Mishkinsky District
- Time zone: UTC+5:00

Malonakaryakovo (Russian: Малонакаряково; Bashkir: Кесе Нәкәрәк, Kese Näkäräk) is a rural locality (a village) and the administrative centre of Staroarzamatovsky Selsoviet, Mishkinsky District, Bashkortostan, Russia. The population was 454 as of 2010. There are 6 streets.

== Geography ==
Malonakaryakovo is located 18 km northeast of Mishkino (the district's administrative centre) by road. Staroarzamatovo is the nearest rural locality.
