= Slobodka, Republic of Bashkortostan =

Slobodka Слободка
- Khutor
- Location within Bashkortostan Location within Russia
- Coordinates: 53°18′N 56°12′E
- Country: Russia
- Region: Bashkortostan
- District: Ishimbaysky District
- Time zone: UTC+5:00

Slobodka (Russian: Слободка) is a rural locality (a khutor) in Skvorchikhinsky Selsoviet, Ishimbaysky District, Bashkortostan, Russia. The population was 12 as of 2010. There are 2 streets.

== Geography ==
Slobodka is located 29 km southeast of Ishimbay (the district's administrative centre) by road. Osipovka is the nearest rural locality.
