= Iktisad =

Iktisad Иктисад
- Village
- Location within Bashkortostan Location within Russia
- Coordinates: 53°41′N 56°25′E
- Country: Russia
- Region: Bashkortostan
- District: Gafuriysky District
- Time zone: UTC+5:00

Iktisad (Russian: Иктисад; Bashkir: Иҡтисад, İqtisad) is a rural locality (a village) in Utyakovsky Selsoviet, Gafuriysky District, Bashkortostan, Russia. The population was 7 as of 2010. There are 2 streets.

== Geography ==
Iktisad is located 28 km south of Krasnousolsky (the district's administrative centre) by road. Ishimovo is the nearest rural locality.
