= Kyzyl-Yul, Mishkinsky District, Republic of Bashkortostan =

Village in Mishkinsky District, Bashkortostan, Russia

Kyzyl-Yul Кызыл-Юл
- Village
- Location within Bashkortostan Location within Russia
- Coordinates: 55°41′N 55°41′E
- Country: Russia
- Region: Bashkortostan
- District: Mishkinsky District
- Time zone: UTC+5:00

Kyzyl-Yul (Russian: Кызыл-Юл; Bashkir: Ҡыҙыл Юл, Qıźıl Yul) is a rural locality (a village) in Baymurzinsky Selsoviet, Mishkinsky District, Bashkortostan, Russia. The population was 25 as of 2010. There is 1 street.

== Geography ==
Kyzyl-Yul is located 52 km northwest of Mishkino (the district's administrative centre) by road. Lenin-Bulyak is the nearest rural locality.
