= Novonikolayevka, Belebeyevsky District, Republic of Bashkortostan =

Novonikolayevka Новониколаевка
- Village
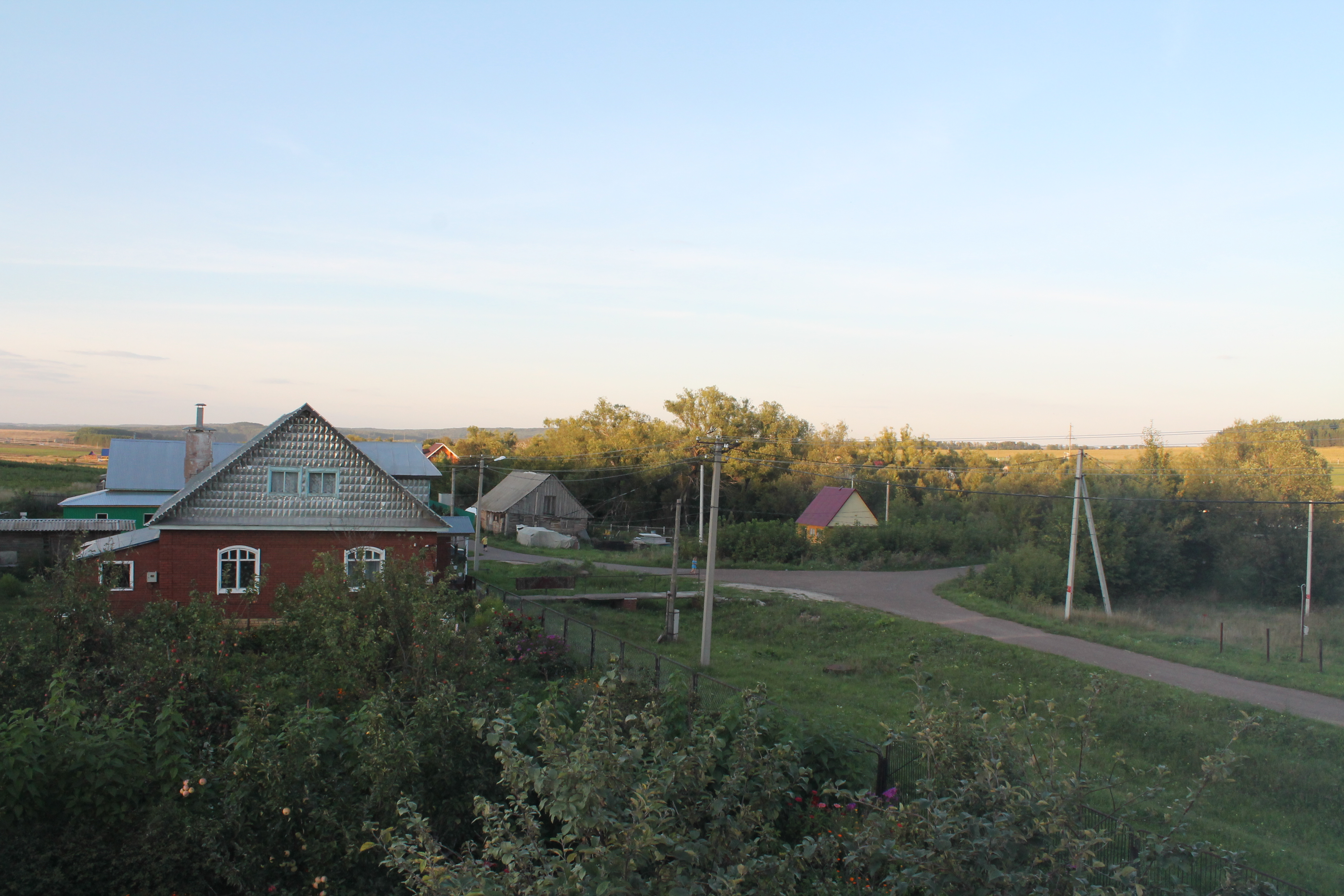

- Location within Bashkortostan Location within Russia
- Coordinates: 53°57′N 53°58′E
- Country: Russia
- Region: Bashkortostan
- District: Belebeyevsky District
- Time zone: UTC+5:00

Novonikolayevka (Russian: Новониколаевка) is a rural locality (a village) in Bazhenovsky Selsoviet, Belebeyevsky District, Bashkortostan, Russia. The population was 54 as of 2010. There is 1 street.

== Geography ==
Novonikolayevka is located 20 km southwest of Belebey (the district's administrative centre) by road. Yekaterinovka is the nearest rural locality.
