= Osipovka, Ishimbaysky District, Republic of Bashkortostan =

Osipovka Осиповка
- Village
- Location within Bashkortostan Location within Russia
- Coordinates: 53°19′N 56°12′E
- Country: Russia
- Region: Bashkortostan
- District: Ishimbaysky District
- Time zone: UTC+5:00

Osipovka (Russian: Осиповка) is a rural locality (a village) in Skvorchikhinsky Selsoviet, Ishimbaysky District, Bashkortostan, Russia. The population was 21 as of 2010. There are 2 streets.

== Geography ==
Osipovka is located 25 km southeast of Ishimbay (the district's administrative centre) by road. Slobodka is the nearest rural locality.
