= Novonikolayevka, Volgograd Oblast =

Novonikolayevka Новониколаевка
- Selo
- Location within Volgograd Oblast Location within Russia
- Coordinates: 50°11′N 45°06′E
- Country: Russia
- Region: Volgograd Oblast
- District: Kotovsky District
- Time zone: UTC+4:00

Novonikolayevka (Russian: Новониколаевка) is a rural locality (a selo) in Kuptsovskoye Rural Settlement, Kotovsky District, Volgograd Oblast, Russia. The population was 268 as of 2010. There are 4 streets.

== Geography ==
Novonikolayevka is located in forest steppe, on Volga Upland, on the left bank of the Mokraya Olkhovka River, 36 km southeast of Kotovo (the district's administrative centre) by road. Petrov Val is the nearest rural locality.
