= Novonikolayevka, Sterlibashevsky District, Republic of Bashkortostan =

Novonikolayevka Новониколаевка
- Village
- Location within Bashkortostan Location within Russia
- Coordinates: 53°20′N 55°22′E
- Country: Russia
- Region: Bashkortostan
- District: Sterlibashevsky District
- Time zone: UTC+5:00

Novonikolayevka (Russian: Новониколаевка) is a rural locality (a village) in Bakeyevsky Selsoviet, Sterlibashevsky District, Bashkortostan, Russia. The population was 71 as of 2010. There are 2 streets.

== Geography ==
Novonikolayevka is located 15 km southeast of Sterlibashevo (the district's administrative centre) by road. Bakeyevo is the nearest rural locality.
