= Novonikolayevka, Fyodorovsky District, Republic of Bashkortostan =

Novonikolayevka Новониколаевка
- Village
- Location within Bashkortostan Location within Russia
- Coordinates: 53°16′N 55°00′E
- Country: Russia
- Region: Bashkortostan
- District: Fyodorovsky District
- Time zone: UTC+5:00

Novonikolayevka (Russian: Новониколаевка) is a rural locality (a village) in Pokrovsky Selsoviet, Fyodorovsky District, Bashkortostan, Russia. The population was 14 as of 2010. There is 1 street.

== Geography ==
Novonikolayevka is located 25 km northwest of Fyodorovka (the district's administrative centre) by road. Staronikolayevka is the nearest rural locality.
