= Hacıhüseynli =

- Municipality
- Location within Azerbaijan
- Coordinates: 41°27′23″N 48°38′56″E
- Country: Azerbaijan
- Rayon: Quba

Population
  - Total: 1,731
- Time zone: UTC+4 (AZT)
  - Summer (DST): UTC+5 (AZT)

Hacıhüseynli (also, Hacı Hüseynli, known as Yelenovka from 1892 to 1992) is a village and municipality in the Quba Rayon of Azerbaijan. It has a population of 1,731. The municipality consists of the villages of Hacıhüseynli and Novonikolayevka.

A village by the name of Hacıhüseynli, populated entirely by Azeris, existed here until 1891 when the population was driven out by the Russian administration for engaging in attacks. It was repopulated in 1892 by Orthodox Russians who had fled Central Russia because of famine and was renamed Yelenovka after Yelena Rogge, the wife of the Baku governor Vladimir Rogge. An Orthodox church was built here later. The village is now mainly populated by ethnic Lezgis.
