= Novonikolayevka, Belgorod Oblast =

Novonikolayevka Новониколаевка
- Selo
- Location within Belgorod Oblast Location within Russia
- Coordinates: 51°13′N 38°16′E
- Country: Russia
- Region: Belgorod Oblast
- District: Starooskolsky District
- Time zone: UTC+3:00

Novonikolayevka (Russian: Новониколаевка) is a rural locality (a selo) in Starooskolsky District, Belgorod Oblast, Russia. The population was 131 as of 2010. There are 5 streets.

== Geography ==
Novonikolayevka is located 40 km east of Stary Oskol (the district's administrative centre) by road. Znamenka is the nearest rural locality.
