= Novonikolayevka, Azerbaijan =

Novonikolayevka
- Location within Azerbaijan
- Coordinates: 41°28′N 48°40′E
- Country: Azerbaijan
- Rayon: Quba
- Municipality: Hacıhüseynli
- Time zone: UTC+4 (AZT)
  - Summer (DST): UTC+5 (AZT)

Novonikolayevka (also, Novomikhalovka) is a village in the Quba Rayon of Azerbaijan. The village forms part of the municipality of Hacıhüseynli.
