= Novonikolayevka, Republic of Dagestan =

Novonikolayevka Новониколаевка
- Selo
- Location within Republic of Dagestan Location within Russia
- Coordinates: 43°59′N 46°41′E
- Country: Russia
- Region: Republic of Dagestan
- District: Tarumovsky District
- Time zone: UTC+3:00

Novonikolayevka (Russian: Новониколаевка) is a rural locality (a selo) in Ullubiyevsky Selsoviet, Tarumovsky District, Republic of Dagestan, Russia. Population: 715 (2010 census); 644 (2002 census); 553 (1989 Soviet census). There are 8 streets.

== Geography ==
Novonikolayevka is located 20 km southeast of Tarumovka (the district's administrative centre) by road. Komsomolsky is the nearest rural locality.
