= Novonikolayevka, Amur Oblast =

Novonikolayevka Новониколаевка
- Selo
- Location within Amur Oblast Location within Russia
- Coordinates: 50°44′N 129°32′E
- Country: Russia
- Region: Amur Oblast
- District: Romnensky District
- Time zone: UTC+9:00

Novonikolayevka (Russian: Новониколаевка) is a rural locality (a selo) in Amaransky Selsoviet of Romnensky District, Amur Oblast, Russia. The population was 103 as of 2018. There is 1 street.

== Geography ==
Novonikolayevka is located 23 km east of Romny (the district's administrative centre) by road. Bratolyubovka is the nearest rural locality.
