= Novonikolayevka, Sterlitamaksky District, Republic of Bashkortostan =

Novonikolayevka Новониколаевка
- Village
- Location within Bashkortostan Location within Russia
- Coordinates: 53°47′N 55°27′E
- Country: Russia
- Region: Bashkortostan
- District: Sterlitamaksky District
- Time zone: UTC+5:00

Novonikolayevka (Russian: Новониколаевка) is a rural locality (a village) in Konstantinogradovsky Selsoviet, Sterlitamaksky District, Bashkortostan, Russia. The population was 6 as of 2010. There is 1 street.

== Geography ==
Novonikolayevka is located 38 km northwest of Sterlitamak (the district's administrative centre) by road. Begenyash is the nearest rural locality.
