= Ishimovo, Ishimbaysky District, Republic of Bashkortostan =

Ishimovo Ишимово
- Village
- Location within Bashkortostan Location within Russia
- Coordinates: 53°40′N 56°25′E
- Country: Russia
- Region: Bashkortostan
- District: Ishimbaysky District
- Time zone: UTC+5:00

Ishimovo (Russian: Ишимово; Bashkir: Ишем, İşem) is a rural locality (a village) in Petrovsky Selsoviet, Ishimbaysky District, Bashkortostan, Russia. The population was 89 as of 2010. There are 2 streets.

== Geography ==
Ishimovo is located 52 km northeast of Ishimbay (the district's administrative centre) by road. Iktisad is the nearest rural locality.
