= Novonikolayevka, Miyakinsky District, Republic of Bashkortostan =

Novonikolayevka Новониколаевка
- Village
- Location within Bashkortostan Location within Russia
- Coordinates: 53°25′N 54°52′E
- Country: Russia
- Region: Bashkortostan
- District: Miyakinsky District
- Time zone: UTC+5:00

Novonikolayevka (Russian: Новониколаевка) is a rural locality (a village) in Kacheganovsky Selsoviet, Miyakinsky District, Bashkortostan, Russia. The population was 13 as of 2010.

== Geography ==
Novonikolayevka is located 25 km south of Kirgiz-Miyaki (the district's administrative centre) by road. Petropavlovka is the nearest rural locality.
