= Novonikolayevka, Yermekeyevsky District, Republic of Bashkortostan =

Novonikolayevka Новониколаевка
- Village
- Location within Bashkortostan Location within Russia
- Coordinates: 54°03′N 53°43′E
- Country: Russia
- Region: Bashkortostan
- District: Yermekeyevsky District
- Time zone: UTC+5:00

Novonikolayevka (Russian: Новониколаевка) is a rural locality (a village) in Nizhneulu-Yelginsky Selsoviet, Yermekeyevsky District, Bashkortostan, Russia. The population was 74 as of 2010. There are 2 streets.

== Geography ==
Novonikolayevka is located 4 km southeast of Yermekeyevo (the district's administrative centre) by road. Nizhneulu-Yelga is the nearest rural locality.
