= Novonikolayevka, Zianchurinsky District, Republic of Bashkortostan =

Novonikolayevka Новониколаевка
- Village
- Location within Bashkortostan Location within Russia
- Coordinates: 52°15′N 56°25′E
- Country: Russia
- Region: Bashkortostan
- District: Zianchurinsky District
- Time zone: UTC+5:00

Novonikolayevka (Russian: Новониколаевка) is a rural locality (a village) in Novochebenkinsky Selsoviet, Zianchurinsky District, Bashkortostan, Russia. The population was 227 as of 2010. There is 1 street.

== Geography ==
Novonikolayevka is located 30 km northwest of Isyangulovo (the district's administrative centre) by road. Nazarovo is the nearest rural locality.
