= Novonikolayevka, Altai Krai =

Novonikolayevka Новониколаевка
- Selo
- Location within Altai Krai Location within Russia
- Coordinates: 51°21′N 81°28′E
- Country: Russia
- Region: Altai Krai
- District: Rubtsovsky District
- Time zone: UTC+7:00

Novonikolayevka (Russian: Новониколаевка) is a rural locality (a selo) and the administrative center of Novonikolayevsky Selsoviet, Rubtsovsky District, Altai Krai, Russia. The population was 887 as of 2013. There are 13 streets.

== Geography ==
Novonikolayevka is located 34 km southeast of Rubtsovsk (the district's administrative centre) by road. Romanovka is the nearest rural locality.
