= Mishkino, Mishkinsky District, Republic of Bashkortostan =

Selo in Mishkinsky District, Bashkortostan, Russia

Mishkino Мишкино
- Selo

Other transcription(s)
  - Bashkir: Мишкә
- Interactive map of Mishkino
- Location of Mishkino Mishkino (Bashkortostan)
- Coordinates: 55°32′03″N 55°57′48″E
- Country: Russia
- Federal subject: Bashkortostan
- Administrative district: Mishkinsky District
- Founded: 1930

Population (2010 Census)
  - Total: 6,021
  - Estimate (2010): 6,021 (0%)

Administrative status
  - Capital of: Mishkinsky District
- Time zone: UTC+5 (MSK+2)
- Postal code: 452340
- OKTMO ID: 80643450101

Mishkino (Russian: Ми́шкино; Bashkir: Мишкә, Mişkä; Meadow Mari: Мишкан, Miškan) is a rural locality (a selo) and the administrative center of Mishkinsky District in the Republic of Bashkortostan, Russia. Population: 6,021 (2010 census); 5,797 (2002 census); 5,582 (1989 Soviet census).
