= Mishkinsky District, Bashkortostan =

Mishkinsky District Мишкинский район (Russian)
- District

Other transcription(s)
  - Bashkir: Мишкә районы
  - Mari: Мишкан кундем
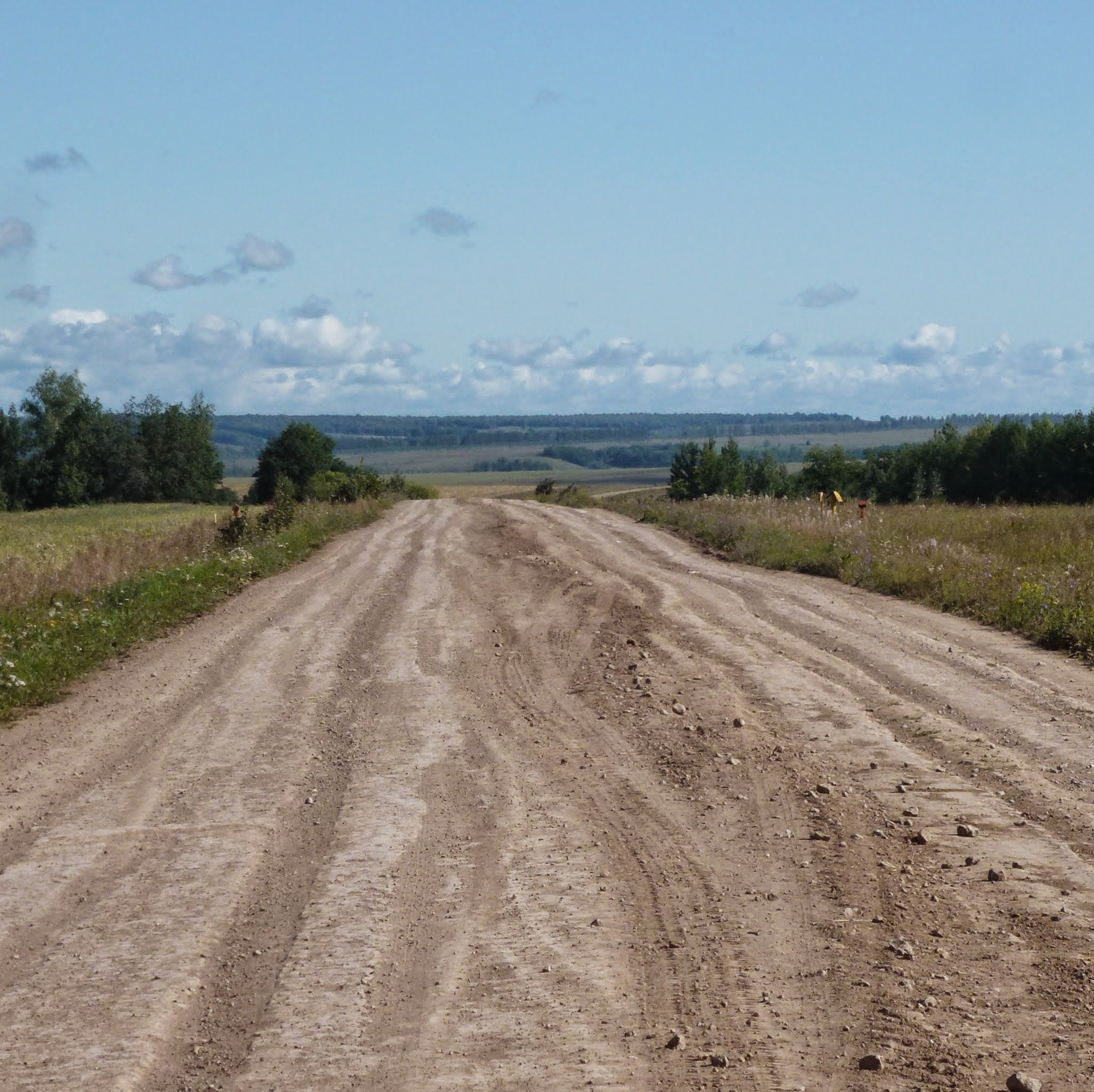
- Road to Ishimova, Mishkinsky District

- Flag Coat of arms
- Location of Mishkinsky District in the Republic of Bashkortostan
- Coordinates: 55°32′N 55°58′E
- Country: Russia
- Federal subject: Republic of Bashkortostan
- Established: 1930
- Administrative center: Mishkino

Area
  - Total: 1,689.11 km^{2} (652.17 sq mi)

Population (2010 Census)
  - Total: 25,318
  - Estimate (2018): 23,136 (−8.6%)
  - Density: 14.989/km^{2} (38.821/sq mi)
  - Urban: 0%
  - Rural: 100%

Administrative structure
  - Administrative divisions: 14 Selsoviets
  - Inhabited localities: 77 rural localities

Municipal structure
  - Municipally incorporated as: Mishkinsky Municipal District
  - Municipal divisions: 0 urban settlements, 14 rural settlements
- Time zone: UTC+5 (MSK+2)
- OKTMO ID: 80643000
- Website: http://www.mishkan.ru

Population of Mishkinsky District
- 2010 Census: 25,318
- 2002 Census: 27,099
- 1989 Census: 28,500
- 1979 Census: 32,674

Mishkinsky District (Russian: Ми́шкинский райо́н; Bashkir: Мишкә районы, Mişkä rayonı; Meadow Mari: Мишкан кундем, Miškan kundem) is an administrative and municipal district (raion), one of the fifty-four in the Republic of Bashkortostan, Russia. It is located in the north of the republic and borders with Burayevsky District in the west and north, Baltachevsky District in the north, Karaidelsky District in the east, Blagoveshchensky District in the southeast, and with Birsky District in the south and southwest. The area of the district is 1,689.11 square kilometers (652.17 sq mi). Its administrative center is the rural locality (a selo) of Mishkino. As of the 2010 Census, the total population of the district was 25,318, with the population of Mishkino accounting for 23.8% of that number.

== History ==
The district was established in 1930. It has a large Mari population - 80% .

== Administrative and municipal status ==
Within the framework of administrative divisions, Mishkinsky District is one of the fifty-four in the Republic of Bashkortostan. The district is divided into fourteen selsoviets, comprising seventy-seven rural localities. As a municipal division, the district is incorporated as Mishkinsky Municipal District. Its fourteen selsoviets are incorporated as fourteen rural settlements within the municipal district. The selo of Mishkino serves as the administrative center of both the administrative and municipal district.
