= Burayevo =

Burayevo Бураево
- Selo

Other transcription(s)
  - Bashkir: Борай
- Interactive map of Burayevo
- Location of Burayevo Burayevo (Bashkortostan)
- Coordinates: 55°50′23″N 55°24′16″E
- Country: Russia
- Federal subject: Bashkortostan
- Administrative district: Burayevsky District
- SelsovietSelsoviet: Burayevsky Selsoviet
- Founded: 1610
- Elevation: 119 m (390 ft)

Population (2010 Census)
  - Total: 9,522
  - Estimate (2010): 9,522 (0%)

Administrative status
  - Capital of: Burayevsky District, Burayevsky Selsoviet

Municipal status
  - Municipal district: Burayevsky Municipal District
  - Rural settlement: Burayevsky Selsoviet Rural Settlement
  - Capital of: Burayevsky Municipal District, Burayevsky Selsoviet Rural Settlement
- Time zone: UTC+5 (MSK+2)
- Postal code: 452960
- OKTMO ID: 80618413101

Burayevo (Russian: Бураево, Bashkir: Борай, Boray) is a rural locality (a selo) and the administrative center of Burayevsky District of the Republic of Bashkortostan, Russia. Population: 9,522 (2010 census); 8,946 (2002 census); 7,879 (1989 Soviet census).
