= Burayevsky District =

Burayevsky District Бураевский район (Russian)
- District

Other transcription(s)
  - Bashkir: Борай районы
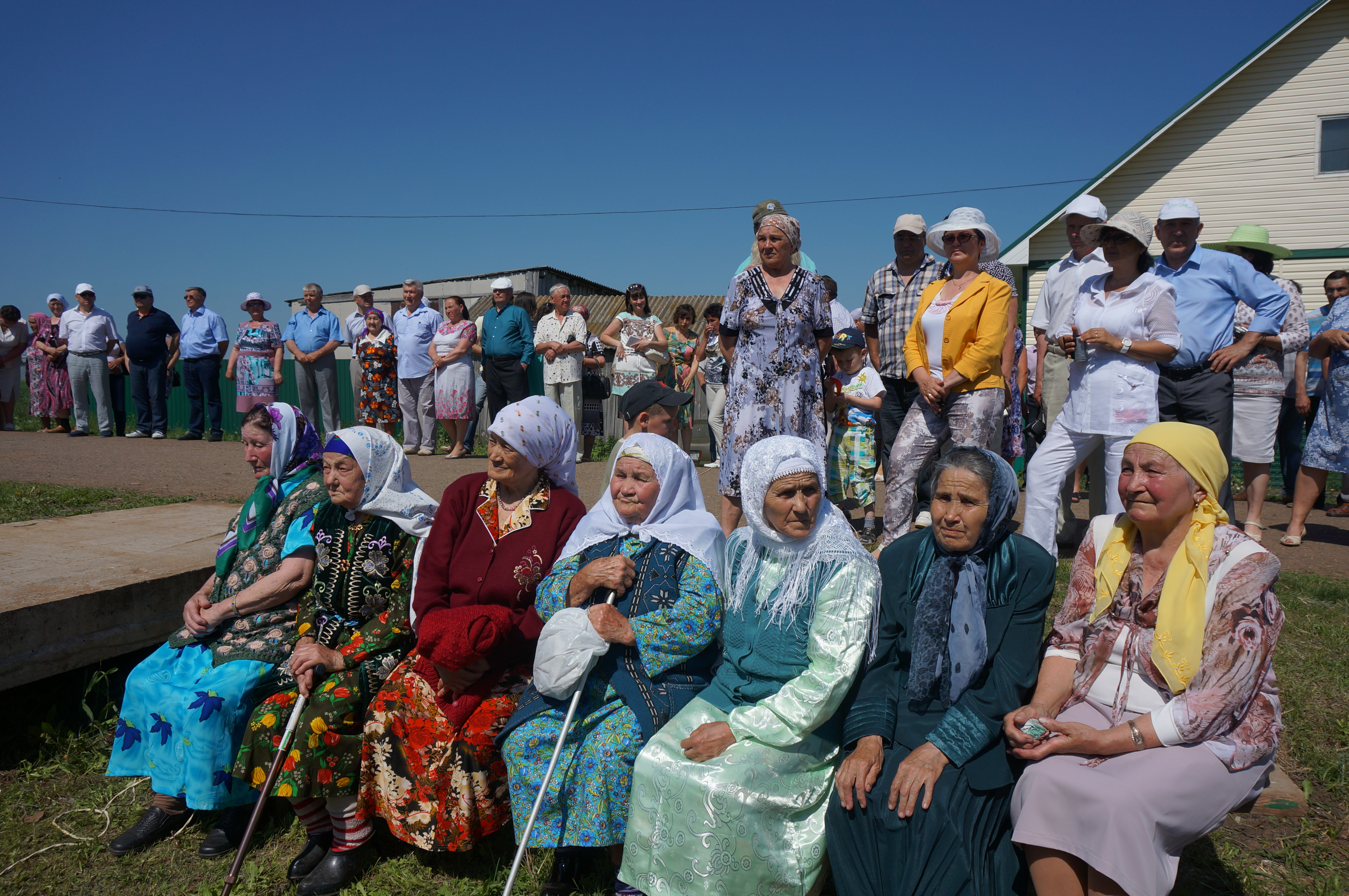
- Gathering in Burayevsky District

- Flag Coat of arms
- Location of Burayevsky District in the Republic of Bashkortostan
- Coordinates: 55°51′N 55°24′E
- Country: Russia
- Federal subject: Republic of Bashkortostan
- Established: 1930
- Administrative center: Burayevo

Area
  - Total: 1,820 km^{2} (700 sq mi)

Population (2010 Census)
  - Total: 25,154
  - Estimate (2018): 21,892 (−13%)
  - Density: 13.8/km^{2} (35.8/sq mi)
  - Urban: 0%
  - Rural: 100%

Administrative structure
  - Administrative divisions: 13 Selsoviets
  - Inhabited localities: 95 rural localities

Municipal structure
  - Municipally incorporated as: Burayevsky Municipal District
  - Municipal divisions: 0 urban settlements, 13 rural settlements
- Time zone: UTC+5 (MSK+2)
- OKTMO ID: 80618000
- Website: https://buraevo.bashkortostan.ru/

Population of Burayevsky District
- 2010 Census: 25,154
- 2002 Census: 28,320
- 1989 Census: 29,968
- 1979 Census: 39,441

Burayevsky District (Russian: Бура́евский райо́н; Bashkir: Борай районы, Boray rayonı) is an administrative and municipal district (raion), one of the fifty-four in the Republic of Bashkortostan, Russia. It is located in the north of the republic and borders with Yanaulsky and Tatyshlinsky Districts in the north, Baltachevsky District in the east, Mishkinsky District in the southeast, Birsky District in the south, Dyurtyulinsky District in the south and southwest, and with Kaltasinsky District in the west. The district is 1,820 square kilometers (700 sq mi). Its administrative center is in a rural locality (a selo) of Burayevo. As of the 2010 Census, the total population of the district was 25,154, with the population of Burayevo accounting for 37.9% of that number.

== History ==
The district was established in 1930.

== Administrative and municipal status ==
Within the framework of administrative divisions, Burayevsky District is one of the fifty-four in the Republic of Bashkortostan. The district is divided into thirteen selsoviets, comprising ninety-five rural localities. As a municipal division, the district is incorporated as Burayevsky Municipal District. Its thirteen selsoviets are incorporated as thirteen rural settlements within the municipal district. The selo of Burayevo serves as the administrative center of both the administrative and municipal district.
