= List of rural localities in Bashkortostan =

Map of Russia with Bashkortostan highlighted

This is a list of rural localities in Bashkortostan. The Republic of Bashkortostan, (/bɑːʃˈkɔːrtoʊstæn/; Bashkir: Башҡортостан Республикаһы, Russian: Респу́блика Башкортоста́н, romanized: Respublika Bashkortostan, IPA: [rʲɪsˈpublʲɪkə bəʂkərtɐˈstan]), also historically known as Bashkiria (Russian: Башки́рия, romanized: Bashkiriya, IPA: [bɐʂˈkʲirʲɪjə]), is a federal subject of Russia (a republic (state)). It is located between the Volga River and the Ural Mountains. Its capital is the city of Ufa. With a population of 4,072,292 as of the 2010 Census, Bashkortostan is the most populous republic in Russia.

== Abzelilovsky District ==
Rural localities in Abzelilovsky District:

- Abdulgazino
- Abdulmambetovo
- Abzelilovo
- Akhmetovo
- Almukhametovo
- Almukhametovo
- Amangildino
- Askarovo
- Aslayevo
- Atavdy
- Aumyshevo
- Avnyash
- Aygyrbatkan
- Ayusazovo
- Baimovo
- Bikkulovo
- Bolshegabdinovo
- Borisovo
- Bulatovo
- Burangulovo
- Dautovo
- Davletovo
- Davletshino
- Derevnya Samarskogo otdeleniya sovkhoza
- Geologorazvedka
- Gusevo, Bashkortostan
- Idyash-Kuskarovo
- Ishbuldino
- Ishkildino
- Ishkulovo
- Iskakovo
- Iskuzhino
- Kalmakovo
- Kazmashevo
- Khalilovo
- Khamitovo
- Khusainovo
- Kirdasovo
- Krasnaya Bashkiriya
- Kulukasovo
- Kusheyevo
- Kusimovo
- Kusimovskogo Rudnika
- Kuzhanovo
- Makhmutovo
- Maygashta
- Mikhaylovka
- Murakayevo
- Niyazgulovo
- Nizhneye Abdryashevo
- Novobalapanovo
- Ozernoye
- Pervomaysky
- Pokrovka
- Rakhmetovo
- Ravilovo
- Ryskuzhino
- Saitkulovo
- Salavat-sovkhoz
- Salavatovo
- Samarskoye
- Selivanovsky
- Severny
- Sharipovo
- Starobalapanovo
- Sukhoye Ozero
- Taksyrovo
- Tal-Kuskarovo
- Tashbulatovo
- Tashtimerovo
- Tashtuy
- Telyashevo
- Tepyanovo
- Tirmen
- Tselinny
- Tuishevo
- Tupakovo
- Ulyandy
- Uralsky
- Utyaganovo
- Verkhneye Abdryashevo
- Yakty-Kul
- Yangelskoye
- Yangi-Aul
- Yarlykapovo
- Yaykarovo
- Yelimbetovo
- Yenikeyevo
- Yuldashevo
- Zelyonaya Polyana

== Alsheyevsky District ==
Rural localities in Alsheyevsky District:

- Abdrashitovo
- Abdulkarimovo
- Adamovka
- Akberda
- Aksenovo
- Aldarovo
- Aleksandrovka
- Andrianovka
- Avryuztamak
- Aydagulovo
- Aytugan
- Balgazy
- Balkan
- Bayazitovo
- Baydakovka
- Belyakovka
- Bikchagul
- Budanyar
- Bugulminka
- Chaykino
- Chebenli
- Chelnokovka
- Churakayevo
- Churayevo
- Dim
- Fan
- Gayniyamak
- Grigoryevka
- Ibrayevo
- Idrisovo
- Igenche
- Irik
- Irshat
- Kamenka
- Karan
- Karmyshevo
- Kayrakly
- Kazanka
- Khanzharovo
- Khrustalevo
- Khusain
- Kim
- Kipchak-Askarovo
- Klinovka
- Kolonka
- Krasnaya Zvezda
- Krasny Klin
- Krymsky
- Kunkas
- Kyzyl Yul
- Linda
- Maloabdrashitovo
- Maloakkulayevo
- Mechnikovo
- Mendyanovo
- Mikhaylovka
- Mikhaylovka
- Murzagulovo
- Neforoshchanka
- Nigmatullino
- Nikifarovo
- Nikolayevka
- Nizhneye Avryuzovo
- Novokonstantinovka
- Novosepyashevo
- Novovozdvizhenka
- Novy Kipchak
- Novyye Balgazy
- Orlovka
- Osorgino
- Otrada
- Rayevsky
- Samodurovka
- Sarayevo
- Sartbash
- Saryshevo
- Selo sanatoriya imeni Chekhova
- Shavranovo
- Shishma
- Slak
- Staraya Vasilyevka
- Staroakkulayevo
- Starosepyashevo
- Stepanovka
- Sulpan
- Tashkichu
- Tashly
- Tashtyube
- Tavrichanka
- Truntaishevo
- Tukmakbash
- Tyubeteyevo
- Urazmetovo
- Urnyak
- Ustyevka
- Uvarovka
- Verkhneye Avryuzovo
- Vozdvizhenka
- Yarabaykul
- Yartashly
- Zelyony Klin

== Arkhangelsky District ==
Rural localities in Arkhangelsky District:

- Abzanovo
- Akkulevo
- Alexeyevskoye
- Andreyevka
- Arkhangelskoye
- Askino
- Asy
- Aytmembetovo
- Azovo
- Bakaldinskoye
- Basinovka
- Belorus-Alexandrovka
- Berezovka
- Beysovo
- Blagoveshchenka
- Chik-Yelga
- Gayfullinskoye
- Gorny
- Irnykshi
- Karagay
- Karakul
- Kartashevka
- Kazanka
- Kizgi
- Knyazevo
- Krasnaya Gorka
- Krasnaya Regizla
- Krasny Zilim
- Kumurly
- Kurgash
- Kuznetsovka
- Kysyndy
- Kyzylyarovo
- Lagutovka
- Lukinsky
- Magash
- Maxim Gorky
- Mikhaylovka
- Mullakayevo
- Nikolayevka
- Novochishma
- Novokyzylyarovo
- Novoshareyevo
- Novoustinovka
- Novyye Sarty
- Orlovka
- Petropavlovka
- Pobeda
- Priuralovka
- Priuralye
- Rodinsky
- Sagitovo
- Shakirovka
- Sukhopol
- Tavakachevo
- Terekly
- Troitskoye
- Tukmakly
- Ubaraly
- Usakly
- Uspenka
- Ustye-Bassy
- Uzunlarovo
- Valentinovka
- Vasilyevka
- Verkhniye Irnykshi
- Verkhniye Lemezy
- Verkhny Frolovsky
- Zaitovo
- Zarya

== Askinsky District ==
Rural localities in Askinsky District:

- Alyagish
- Amirovo
- Arbashevo
- Askino
- Avaday
- Barakhayevka
- Bashkortostan
- Bazanchatovo
- Bilgish
- Bolshoye Ozero
- Chad
- Chishma-Urakayevo
- Churashevo
- Chyornoye Ozero
- Davlyatovka
- Dultsevka
- Gumbino
- Kamashady
- Kartkisyak
- Kashkino
- Kigazy
- Klyuchevoy Log
- Klyuchi
- Korolyovo
- Kshlau-Yelga
- Kubiyazy
- Kuchanovo
- Kungak
- Kungakbash
- Kushkul
- Kuyashtyr
- Lyubimovka
- Matala
- Mikhaylovka
- Muta-Yelga
- Novaya Burma
- Novaya Kara
- Novokochkildino
- Novy Kartkisyak
- Novy Mutabash
- Novy Suyush
- Novyye Bagazy
- Novyye Kazanchi
- Olkhovy Klyuch
- Petropavlovka
- Russkaya Kara
- Shorokhovo
- Staraya Kara
- Starokochkildino
- Stary Mutabash
- Staryye Kazanchi
- Stepanovka
- Sultanay
- Sultanbekovo
- Talog
- Tashlykul
- Tulguzbash
- Tupraly
- Tyuysk
- Ulu-Yelga
- Upkankul
- Urmankul
- Urmiyazy
- Urshady
- Ust-Tabaska
- Utyashino
- Vash-Yazy
- Verkhnenikolskoye
- Yanaul
- Yankisyak
- Yerma-Yelan
- Yevbulyak

== Aurgazinsky District ==
Rural localities in Aurgazinsky District:

- Abdrakhmanovo
- Abdullino
- Akhmerovo
- Akhmetovo
- Alexandrovka
- Alexeyevka
- Alexeyevka
- Amzya
- Andreyevka
- Arslanovo
- Asavbashevo
- Baishevo
- Bakayevo
- Balyklykul
- Baykal
- Belogorsky
- Belogorsky
- Berezovka
- Berlek
- Bishkain
- Bolotino
- Borisovka
- Chishma
- Chishma
- Chubaytal
- Chulpan
- Chulpan
- Chuvash-Karamaly
- Chuvashsky Nagadak
- Dadanovka
- Daryevka
- Daryino
- Dobrovolnoye
- Dubrovka
- Dyurtuli
- Gumerovo
- Ibrayevo
- Igenche
- Ishly
- Ismagilovo
- Ivanovka
- Kalchiburan
- Kamenka
- Kebyachevo
- Khasanovo
- Knyazevka
- Krasny Vostok
- Kshanny
- Kultura
- Kurmanayevo
- Kushkul
- Kuyezbashevo
- Kuzminovka
- Makarovo
- Malaya Ivanovka
- Maloye Ibrayevo
- Maly Nagadak
- Maneyevo
- Mars
- Maryanovka
- Meseli
- Mikhaylovka
- Minnibayevo
- Muksino
- Muradym
- Mustafino
- Nadezhdina
- Nagadak
- Naumkino
- Nazmutdinovo
- Nikolayevka
- Nikolsk
- Nikolskoye
- Nizhniye Lekandy
- Nizhny Begenyash
- Novoadzitarovo
- Novochelatkanovo
- Novofedorovka
- Novogurovka
- Novoitikeyevo
- Novomustafino
- Novotimoshkino
- Novy Kalchir
- Novyye Karamaly
- Pokrovka
- Potashevka
- Sabanchi
- Salikhovo
- Semyonkino
- Sheverli
- Shlanly
- Sitdik-Mullino
- Sosnovka
- Staraya Ivanovka
- Staroabsalyamovo
- Staroitikeyevo
- Starokuzyakovo
- Staromakarovo
- Starotimoshkino
- Staroye Ibrayevo
- Staryye Karamaly
- Stepanovka
- Subkhangulovo
- Suleymanovo
- Sultanmuratovo
- Talnik
- Tashlykul
- Tashtamak
- Tatarsky Nagadak
- Tereshkovka
- Tolbazy
- Tolmachevka
- Trudovka
- Tryapino
- Tukayevo
- Tursugali
- Turumbet
- Tyubyakovo
- Uksunny
- Usmanovo
- Usmanovo
- Ust-Belishevo
- Utarkul
- Uteymullino
- Verkhniye Lekandy
- Verkhny Begenyash
- Veselovka
- Volkovo
- Vyazovka
- Yakty-Yul
- Yermolayevka
- Yulamanovo
- Yuldashevo
- Zaitovo
- Zhuravlyovka

== Bakalinsky District ==
Rural localities in Bakalinsky District:

- Akhmanovo
- Akhmerovo
- Alexandrovka
- Bakaly
- Balchikly
- Batrak
- Budyonnovets
- Bugabashevo
- Buzyorovo
- Chumalya
- Derevnya penkozavoda
- Diyashevo
- Dubrovka
- Galiullinka
- Georgiyevka
- Gurdybashevo
- Ivanovka
- Kamayevo
- Kamayevo
- Kamyshlytamak
- Kandalakbashevo
- Karpovka
- Kazanchi
- Kileyevo
- Kilkabyzovo
- Krasnaya Gorka
- Kurcheyevo
- Kuruch-Karan
- Kushtiryakovo
- Kyzyl Bulyak
- Mikhaylovka
- Mikhaylovka
- Mirzaitovo
- Mullanurovo
- Muncha-Yelga
- Mustafino
- Nagaybakovo
- Narat-Chukur
- Narat-Yelga
- Nikolayevka
- Nizhneye Novokosteyevo
- Novoagbyazovo
- Novoalmetyevo
- Novogusevo
- Novoilikovo
- Novokatayevo
- Novokosteyevo
- Novokuruchevo
- Novoostankovo
- Novosasykul
- Novotroitskoye
- Novoursayevo
- Novoye Azmeyevo
- Novy Shugan
- Novy Tumutuk
- Novyye Balykly
- Novyye Maty
- Novyye Sharashli
- Novyye Usy
- Orlovka
- Palchikovo
- Petrovka
- Petrovka
- Plodoyagodnaya
- Pokrovka
- Sakatovo
- Sazonovka
- Sosnovka
- Starogusevo
- Staroilikovo
- Starokatayevo
- Starokosteyevo
- Starokuruchevo
- Starokuyanovo
- Staroye Azmeyevo
- Staryye Balykly
- Staryye Maty
- Staryye Sharashli
- Suyundyukovo
- Taktagulovo
- Tally-Syza
- Umirovo
- Urman
- Urmananayevo
- Ustyumovo
- Utarovo
- Verkhnetroitskoye
- Vesyolaya Polyana
- Vorsinka
- Yultimirovka
- Yurminka
- Zirikly

== Baltachevsky District ==
Rural localities in Baltachevsky District:

- Annovka
- Ardagysh
- Asavka
- Bigildino
- Bogdanovo
- Bulyak
- Chipchikovo
- Chishma
- Chiyatau
- Chukaly
- Churapanovo
- Churtanlykul
- Gareyka
- Imyanovo
- Ishtiryakovo
- Kazanka
- Kizganbashevo
- Kumyazy
- Kundashly
- Kuntugushevo
- Kurachevo
- Kuzeyevo
- Kyzyl Vostok
- Kyzyl-Kul
- Magashly-Almantayevo
- Managazovo
- Mata
- Mishcherovo
- Mishkino
- Nacharovo
- Nizhneivanayevo
- Nizhnekansiyarovo
- Nizhnekaryshevo
- Nizhnesikiyazovo
- Nizhneyanaktayevo
- Norkino
- Novobaltachevo
- Novodyurtyukeyevo
- Novotoshkurovo
- Novourazayevo
- Novoyaksheyevo
- Novoyamurzino
- Novoyanbayevo
- Rakhimkulovo
- Sandugach
- Seytyakovo
- Shavyady
- Shtandy
- Starobaltachevo
- Starodyurtyukeyevo
- Staroilikeyevo
- Starosultangulovo
- Starotimkino
- Staroyaksheyevo
- Staroyamurzino
- Staroyanbayevo
- Staryye Kargaly
- Tashly-Yelga
- Tibelevo
- Toshkurovo
- Tuchubayevo
- Tuktayevo
- Tutagachevo
- Tuzlubino
- Tykanovo
- Urazayevo
- Urta-Yelga
- Usmanovo
- Verkhneivanayevo
- Verkhnekansiyarovo
- Verkhnekaryshevo
- Verkhneyanaktayevo
- Yakunino
- Yalangachevo
- Yantimirovo
- Zilyazekulevo

== Baymaksky District ==
Rural localities in Baymaksky District:

- 1st Itkulovo
- 1st Turkmenevo
- 2nd Itkulovo
- 2nd Turkemenevo
- Abdrakhmanovo
- Abdulkarimovo
- Abzakovo
- Akhmerovo
- Akmurun
- Aktau
- Algazino
- Aminevo
- Baimovo
- Baishevo
- Bakhtigareyevo
- Bakhtigareyevo
- Baymurzino
- Bekeshevo
- Beterya
- Bilyalovo
- Bogachyovo
- Bolshebasayevo
- Buranbayevo
- Burzyan-Yelga
- Chingizovo
- Davletovo
- Derevnya Kozhzavoda
- Gadelbayevo
- Galeyevo
- Gumerovo
- Ishberda
- Ishey
- Ishmukhametovo
- Ishmurzino
- Islamovo
- Isyanbetovo
- Isyanovo
- Kalinino
- Karatal
- Karyshkino
- Kazanka
- Khasanovo
- Komsomol
- Krepostnoy Zilair
- Kugidel
- Kulchurovo
- Kultaban
- Kuseyevo
- Kuvatovo
- Kuyantayevo
- Meryasovo
- Mukasovo 1-e
- Mukasovo 2-e
- Mullakayevo
- Munasipovo
- Nazarovo
- Nigamatovo
- Nizhneidrisovo
- Nizhnetagirovo
- Nizhnetavlykayevo
- Nizhneyaikbayevo
- Oktyabr
- Pokrovka
- Sakmar
- Saksay
- Saygafar
- Semyonovo
- Semyonovskoye
- Shulka
- Sosnovka
- Stary Sibay
- Taktagulovo
- Tatlybayevo
- Temyasovo
- Tubinsky
- Umetbayevo
- Ural
- Urgaza
- Verkhneidrisovo
- Verkhnemambetovo
- Verkhnetagirovo
- Verkhnetavlykayevo
- Verkhneyaikbayevo
- Yangazino
- Yanzigitovo
- Yaratovo
- Yarmukhametovo
- Yuluk
- Yumashevo
- Zelimovo

== Belebeyevsky District ==
Rural localities in Belebeyevsky District:

- Adelkino
- Akbasar
- Akkain
- Aksakovo
- Alexeyevka
- Annenkovo
- Annovka
- Azekeyevo
- Baymurzino
- Bayrak
- Bazhenovo
- Berezovka
- Brik-Alga
- Bulanovka
- Cheganly
- Chermasan
- Chubukaran
- Chubukaran
- Derevnya razyezda Maksyutovo
- Derevnya razyezda Ryabash
- Durasovo
- Fyodorovka
- Glukhovskaya
- Gusarkino
- Ik-Vershina
- Ilkino
- Irek
- Ismagilovo
- Kain-Yelga
- Kanash
- Kazanlytamak
- Kirillovka
- Kluchevka
- Krasnaya Zarya
- Krasnorechka
- Krasnoyar
- Kum-Kosyak
- Kush-Yelga
- Malinovka
- Maloaleksandrovka
- Martynovo
- Metevbash
- Mezhdugornoye
- Mikhaylovsky
- Mochilki
- Nadezhdino
- Novaya Derevnya
- Novokazanka
- Novonikolayevka
- Novosarayevo
- Novosemenkino
- Orlovka
- Pakhar
- Parafeyevka
- Podlesnoye
- Pokrovka
- Pyzhyanovsky
- Rassvet
- Repyevka
- Rodniki
- Russkaya Shveytsariya
- Savkino
- Selo Tsentralnoy usadby plemzavoda imeni Maxima Gorkogo
- Selo sanatoriya Glukhovskogo
- Serdyuki
- Sharovka
- Shelkanovo
- Siushka
- Skobelevka
- Slakbash
- Sosnovy Bor
- Starosemenkino
- Svetlovka
- Svoboda
- Tuzlukush
- Usen-Ivanovskoye
- Uteyka
- Verkhneyermolgi
- Verovka
- Vesyolaya Roshcha
- Yangi-Kyuch
- Yekaterinovka
- Yermolkino
- Znamenka

== Belokataysky District ==
Rural localities in Belokataysky District:

- Absalyamovo
- Aputovo
- Ashayevo
- Atarsha
- Aydakayevo
- Aygyryal
- Belyanka
- Kadyrovo
- Karantrav
- Karlykhanovo
- Kayupovo
- Khaybatovo
- Kirikeyevo
- Krasny Muravey
- Krasny Pakhar
- Kurgashka
- Levali
- Maygaza
- Medyatovo
- Morozovka
- Munasovo
- Nizhneutyashevo
- Nizhny Iskush
- Nogushi
- Novaya Maskara
- Novobelokatay
- Perevoz
- Shakarla
- Shaydala
- Shigayevka
- Sokolki
- Sosnovka
- Sosnovy Log
- Staraya Maskara
- Starobelokatay
- Tardavka
- Urakovo
- Urgala
- Vaselga
- Verkhneutyashevo
- Verkhny Iskush
- Voskhod
- Yanybayevo
- Yemashi
- Yuldashevo

== Beloretsky District ==
Rural localities in Beloretsky District:

- Abzakovo
- Aisovo
- Akhmerovo
- Alexandrovka
- Arsky Kamen
- Aryshparovo
- Assy
- Aygir
- Azikeyevo
- Aznagulovo
- Aznalkino
- Bakeyevo
- Belsky
- Berdagulovo
- Brish
- Brishtamak
- Buganak
- Butayevo
- Bzyak
- Chernovka
- Chyorny Klyuch
- Dachnaya
- Dubinino
- Gabdyukovo
- Inzer
- Ishlya
- Iskushta
- Ismakayevo
- Kadysh
- Kaga
- Kagarmanovo
- Karagay-Yurt
- Karagayly
- Kartalinskaya Zapan
- Kartaly
- Kasmakty
- Katarysh
- Katayka
- Khaybullino
- Khusainovo
- Komarovo
- Korpusta
- Kudashmanovo
- Kulmas
- Kumbino
- Kuzgun-Akhmerovo
- Lomovka
- Makhmutovo
- Manyshta
- Maygashlya
- Mukhametovo
- Muldakayevo
- Nikolayevka
- Nizhny Avzyan
- Nizhnyaya Manyava
- Nizhnyaya Tyulma
- Nizhnyaya Yatva
- Novoabzakovo
- Novobelskoye
- Novokhasanovo
- Nukatovo
- Otnurok (selo)
- Otnurok (village)
- Revet
- Roshcha
- Rysakayevo
- Safargulovo
- Saryshka
- Satra
- Sermenevo
- Shigayevo
- Shushpa
- Sosnovka
- Tara
- Tikhy Klyuch
- Tirlyan
- Tukan
- Uluyelga
- Umetbayevo
- Uraltau
- Usmangali
- Utkalevo
- Uzyan
- Uzyanbash
- Verkhnearshinsky
- Verkhnebelsky
- Verkhny Avzyan
- Yandek
- Yelan
- Yermotayevo
- Zapadnaya Maygashlya
- Zheleznodorozhny
- Zigaza
- Zuyakovo

== Birsky District ==
Rural localities in Birsky District:

- Akkainovo
- Akudi
- Akudibashevo
- Alexandrovka
- Andreyevka
- Aybashevo
- Aygildino
- Bakhtybayevo
- Bazhenovo
- Bekmurzino
- Berezovka
- Chishma
- Chishma
- Chistyye Prudy
- Demidovsky
- Desyatkino
- Kalinniki
- Kamyshenka
- Kandakovka
- Kostarevo
- Koyanovo
- Kriushi
- Kusekeyevo
- Kuzovo
- Lezhebokovo
- Luch
- Malosukhoyazovo
- Mansurovo
- Mayadykovo
- Mordvinovka
- Nikolayevka
- Nikolsky
- Nizhnelachentau
- Novobaishevo
- Novobiktimirovo
- Novoburnovo
- Novodesyatkino
- Novokulchubayevo
- Novopetrovo
- Novoyantuzovo
- Osinovka
- Pechenkino
- Penkovo
- Pioner
- Pityakovo
- Popovka
- Romanovka
- Samosadka
- Shamsutdin
- Shelkanovo
- Shestykovo
- Silantyevo
- Simkino
- Sorvikha
- Sosnovy Bor
- Srednebazanovo
- Starobazanovo
- Starobiktimirovo
- Staroburnovo
- Staropetrovo
- Staroyezhevo
- Startsino
- Suslovo
- Uguzevo
- Uleyevo
- Urnyak
- Usakovo
- Uzhara
- Verkhnelachentau
- Voznesenka
- Vyazovsky
- Yangitau
- Yemashevo
- Zelyony
- Zuyevo

== Bizhbulyaksky District ==
Rural localities in Bizhbulyaksky District:

- Aitovo
- Alexandrovka
- Alexeyevka
- Alexeyevka
- Antonovka
- Aznayevo
- Barsh
- Bazlyk
- Berezovka
- Bikkulovo
- Bizhbulyak
- Bogolyubovka
- Chulpan
- Dyomsky
- Dyusyanovo
- Ibraykino
- Ignashkino
- Isyakayevo
- Ittikhat
- Ivanovka
- Kachkinovo
- Kalinovka
- Kamenka
- Kanareyka
- Kandry-Kul
- Kanykayevo
- Karimovo
- Kasimovka
- Kenger-Meneuz
- Khomutovka
- Kistenli-Bogdanovo
- Kistenli-Ivanovka
- Kosh-Yelga
- Kozhay-Ikskiye Vershiny
- Krasnaya Gorka
- Kunakulovo
- Lassirma
- Lysogorka
- Maly Meneuz
- Maly Sedyak
- Meneuz-Moskva
- Mikhaylovka
- Milisonovka
- Mullanur-Bakhitovo
- Muradymovo
- Musino
- Naberezhny
- Nizhnyaya Kurmaza
- Novaya Samarka
- Novy Biktyash
- Olkhovka
- Pchelnik
- Petrovka
- Petrovka
- Progress
- Purlyga
- Razayevka
- Rudniki
- Sarmandeyevka
- Sedyakbash
- Sene-Purnas
- Shkapovo
- Shomyrtly
- Sosnovka
- Stepanovka
- Stepanovka
- Sukhorechka
- Svetlovka
- Takmakkaran
- Tukay
- Tulubayevo
- Usak-Kichu
- Vasilkino
- Verkhnyaya Kurmaza
- Vishnevka
- Yegorovka
- Yelbulak-Matveyevka
- Yelbulaktamak
- Yermolkino
- Zirikly
- Ziriklytamak

== Blagovarsky District ==
Rural localities in Blagovarsky District:

- 1st Alkino
- 6th Alkino
- Agardy
- Akhmetovo
- Akhunovo
- Alexeyevka
- Balyshly
- Barsuan
- Bashbulyak
- Bashterma
- Bik-Usak
- Blagovar
- Buzoulyk
- Chatra
- Chulpan 2-y
- Dmitriyevka
- Dombrovka
- Dusmetovo
- Kamyshly
- Kargalybash
- Kargalytamak
- Kashkalashi
- Khlebodarovka
- Kirillo-Karmasan
- Klimentovka
- Kob-Pokrovka
- Kugul
- Kullekul
- Kyzyl-Chishma
- Kyzyl-Yulduz
- Lomovo
- Mirny
- Moiseyevo
- Neyfeld
- Nizhniye Kargaly
- Novoabzanovo
- Novoalexandrovka
- Novokonstantinovka
- Novonikolskoye
- Novy Bulyak
- Novy Syntash
- Novy Troitsky
- Obshchina
- Pervomaysky
- Pokrovka 2-ya
- Prishib
- Samarino
- Sarayly
- Shameyevo
- Sharlyk
- Slakbash
- Staroabzanovo
- Staroamirovo
- Starogornovo
- Starokucherbayevo
- Starousmanovo
- Stary Syntash
- Staryye Sanny
- Syntashtamak
- Tabuldak
- Takchura
- Tallykul
- Tan
- Toporinka
- Troitsk
- Troitsky
- Tyurkeyevo
- Tyuryushtamak
- Udryakbash
- Uly-Aryama
- Usmanovo
- Uzybash
- Verkhniye Kargaly
- Viktorovka
- Vostochny
- Yalankul
- Yamakay
- Yanbakty
- Yanyshevo
- Yazykovo
- Zapadny
- Zarechny
- Zur-Bulyak

== Blagoveshchensky District ==
Rural localities in Blagoveshchensky District

- 2nd Alexandrovka
- Akhlystino
- Alexandrovka
- Alexandrovka
- Andreyevka
- Anninskaya
- Aramelevka
- Arkaul
- Ashkashla
- Bedeyeva Polyana
- Berezovka
- Beryozovaya Polyana
- Bishtinovo
- Bogorodskoye
- Bolshoy Log
- Bulatovo
- Bulychyovo
- Bykovo
- Dachnaya
- Dmitriyevka
- Emanino
- Fayzullinskoye
- Fyodorovka
- Gorny Urazbay
- Gumerovo
- Ilyino-Polyana
- Ilyinsky
- Kamennaya Polyana
- Karagaykul
- Kazanka
- Khristolyubovo
- Klyuchi
- Krasnaya Burna
- Kuliki
- Kurech
- Kurgashtamak
- Mikhaylovka
- Mukhametdinovo
- Nikolayevka
- Nikolskoye
- Nizhny Izyak
- Novoblagoveshchenka
- Novoilikovo
- Novominzitarovo
- Novonadezhdino
- Novonikolsky
- Novyye Turbasly
- Olkhovka
- Orlovka
- Oshmyanka
- Osipovka
- Pekarskaya
- Pokrovka
- Pokrovskoye
- Preobrazhenskoye
- Pushkino
- Rozhdestvenskoye
- Rudny
- Sanninskoye
- Sedovka
- Sedyash
- Sergeyevka
- Serguyaz
- Shalana
- Sharipovka
- Shchepnoye
- Sitniki
- Sokolovskoye
- Sologubovka
- Starogilevo
- Staroilikovo
- Staronadezhdino
- Suneyevka
- Tanayka
- Tornovka
- Troshkino
- Truzhenik
- Tugay
- Tuktarovo
- Turushla
- Udelno-Duvaney
- Ukman
- Usa
- Usa-Stepanovka
- Usabash
- Uspenka
- Ustyugovsky
- Varyaz
- Verkhny Izyak
- Vladimirovka
- Volkovo
- Voskresenka
- Yablochny
- Yazykovo
- Yevgrafovka
- Yezhovka

== Burayevsky District ==
Rural localities in Burayevsky District:

- Abdrashbash
- Abdullino
- Abzaevo
- Aitovo
- Aldarovo
- Altayevo
- Ardashevo
- Arnyashevo
- Arslanbekovo
- Asavtamak
- Azyakovo
- Bakaly
- Baysakino
- Bayshady
- Berlyachevo
- Biginyayevo
- Bikzyan
- Bolshebadrakovo
- Bolsheshukshanovo
- Burayevo
- Bustanayevo
- Chelkakovo
- Chishma-Burayevo
- Dautlarovo
- Davlekanovo
- Dyusmetovo
- Frunze
- Gumerovo
- Ishmametovo
- Kadrikovo
- Kainlykovo
- Kalmykovo
- Kam-Klyuch
- Kamelevo
- Karabayevo
- Karatamak
- Karazirikovo
- Kashkalevo
- Kasiyarovo
- Khaziyevo
- Kreshchenka
- Kudashevo
- Kulayevo
- Kushmanakovo
- Kutliyarovo
- Kuzbayevo
- Kyzyl-Oktyabr
- Lenin-Bulyak
- Malobadrakovo
- Maloshukshanovo
- Mamady
- Minlino
- Mullino
- Naryshevo
- Nikolayevka
- Novoaltybayevo
- Novobikmetovo
- Novokaragushevo
- Novokizganovo
- Novomustafino
- Novoshilikovo
- Novotazlarovo
- Novoyeldyakovo
- Novyye Kargaly
- Sait-Kurzya
- Saitbayevo
- Sarmashevo
- Sarsaz
- Shabayevo
- Shunyakovo
- Sibirganovo
- Silosovo
- Starobikmetovo
- Starokaragushevo
- Starokizganovo
- Starokurzya
- Staromustafino
- Starotazlarovo
- Starotukranovo
- Sulzibash
- Sumsabashevo
- Tangatarovo
- Tansyzarovo
- Taztuba
- Teplyaki
- Tugaryakovo
- Tugayevo
- Tukayevo
- Uleyevo
- Utyaganovo
- Vanysh-Alpautovo
- Varzitamak
- Vostretsovo
- Votkurzya
- Yumakayevo

== Burzyansky District ==
Rural localities in Burzyansky District:

- Abdulmambetovo
- Akbulatovo
- Askarovo
- Atikovo
- Baygazino
- Baynazarovo
- Bretyak
- Gadelgareyevo
- Galiakberovo
- Irgizly
- Ishdavletovo
- Islambayevo
- Kildigulovo
- Kiyekbayevo
- Kulganino
- Kurgashly
- Kutanovo
- Magadeyevo
- Maly Kipchak
- Maxyutovo
- Mindigulovo
- Muradymovo
- Nabiyevo
- Novomunasipovo
- Novomusyatovo
- Novosubkhangulovo
- Novousmanovo
- Sargaya
- Staromunasipovo
- Staromusyatovo
- Starosubkhangulovo
- Timirovo
- Verkhny Nugush
- Yaumbayevo

== Buzdyaksky District ==
Rural localities in Buzdyaksky District:

- Akhun
- Amirovo
- Annovka
- Arslanovo
- Bakcha
- Batyrsha-Kubovo
- Bayrash
- Biyek
- Bolshaya Ustyuba
- Buzdyak
- Chishma
- Chulpan
- Derevnya Khozyaystva Zagotskota
- Gafuri
- Idyashbash
- Ishmenevo
- Ishtiryak
- Kanly-Turkeyevo
- Karan
- Karanay
- Karanbash
- Karazirek
- Kartamak
- Kazaklar-Kubovo
- Khaziman
- Kilimovo
- Kiska-Yelga
- Kiskakulbash
- Kiyazibash
- Klyatayak
- Komsomol
- Kopey-Kubovo
- Kubyak
- Kuzeyevo
- Kuzminka
- Kyzyl-Yar
- Kyzyl-Yelga
- Mikhaylovka
- Nikolskoye
- Nizhnyaya Chatra
- Novoaktau
- Novokilimovo
- Novotavlarovo
- Novy Shigay
- Pismantamak
- Rassvet
- Sabanayevo
- Sabayevo
- Selo Saraygirovskogo otdeleniya Urtakulskogo sovkhoza
- Sergeyevka
- Sevadybashevo
- Sharbash
- Shigaykulbash
- Shlanlykulevo
- Staroaktau
- Starotavlarovo
- Stary Buzdyak
- Stary Karbash
- Stary Shigay
- Staryye Bogady
- Syrtlanovo
- Tallykulevo
- Tashlykul
- Telyakey-Kubovo
- Tugayevo
- Tuktarkul
- Tyuryushevo
- Ural
- Uranovo
- Urtakul
- Urzaybash
- Usmanovsky
- Volodarskoye
- Vostochnoye
- Voznesenka
- Yakupovo
- Yaltyrkulbash
- Yardam
- Yulduzly
- Yuraktau

== Chekmagushevsky District ==
Rural localities in Chekmagushevsky District:

- Ablaevo
- Akhmetovo
- Bardasly
- Baybulatovo
- Bikmetovo
- Bulgar
- Bulyakovo
- Chekmagush
- Chishma-Karan
- Chiyalikulevo
- Churtanbashevo
- Igenche
- Imyanlikulevo
- Kalmashbashevo
- Karan
- Karatalovo
- Karazirikovo
- Kargaly
- Kashakovo
- Kashkarovo
- Kavkaz
- Kinderkulevo
- Kusekeyevo
- Kyzyl-Yulduz
- Lenino
- Makarovka
- Mitro-Ayupovskoye
- Narimanovo
- Nikolayevka
- Nizhniye Karyavdy
- Novaya Murtaza
- Novobalakovo
- Novobaltachevo
- Novobashirovo
- Novobikkino
- Novoikhsanovo
- Novokalmashevo
- Novokarazirikovo
- Novokutovo
- Novopuchkakovo
- Novoresmekeyevo
- Novosemenkino
- Novosurmetovo
- Novotaynyashevo
- Novoyumranovo
- Novyye Karyavdy
- Nur
- Rapatovo
- Resmekeyevo
- Rezyapovo
- Sary-Aygyr
- Starobalakovo
- Starobashirovo
- Starobikkino
- Staroikhsanovo
- Starokalmashevo
- Staropuchkakovo
- Starosurmetovo
- Starouzmyashevo
- Staryye Chupty
- Syyryshbashevo
- Tamyanovo
- Tashkalmashevo
- Taskakly
- Taynyashevo
- Tukayevo
- Tuzlukushevo
- Urnyak
- Uybulatovo
- Verkhniye Karyavdy
- Verkhny Atash
- Yana Birde
- Yash-Kuch
- Yumashevo
- Zemeyevo

== Chishminsky District ==
Rural localities in Chishminsky District:

- Abrayevo
- Albeyevo
- Alexandrovka
- Alkino
- Alkino-2
- Aminevo
- Arovo
- Arslanovo
- Babikovo
- Bakhchi
- Balagushevo
- Barsuanbashevo
- Bikeyevo
- Bikkulovo
- Bilyazy
- Bishkazi
- Bochkaryovka
- Bogolyubovka
- Bogomolovka
- Boriskino
- Bulyakbashevo
- Chernigovka
- Chukrakly
- Chuvalkipovo
- Dalny
- Dim
- Dmitriyevka
- Dmitriyevka
- Durasovo
- Dyoma
- Ekaterinoslavka
- Gorny
- Ibragimovo
- Ignatovka
- Ilkashevo
- Irek
- Isakovka
- Kakhnovka
- Kalmashevo
- Kara-Yakupovo
- Karamaly
- Karan-Yelga
- Kavetka
- Klyashevo
- Klyucharyovo
- Krasny Oktyabr
- Kuchumovo
- Kushkuak
- Kuzminka
- Kyzylga
- Lentovka
- Leonidovka
- Lomonosovo
- Marusino
- Nizhnekhozyatovo
- Nizhniye Termy
- Nizhny
- Novaya
- Novoabdullino
- Novokiyevka
- Novomikhaylovka
- Novomusino
- Novosafarovo
- Novosayranovo
- Novotroitskoye
- Novouptino
- Novousmanovo
- Novy Berkadak
- Novye Yabalakly
- Pasyakovka
- Penza
- Pervomaysky
- Petryayevo
- Repyevka
- Romanovka
- Saburovo
- Safarovo
- Salikhovo
- Sanzharovka
- Sayranovo
- Selo sanatoriya Alkino
- Semyonovka
- Sharapovka
- Shingak-Kul
- Slak
- Srednekhozyatovo
- Sredneusmanovo
- Staromusino
- Teperishevo
- Udryak
- Urazbakhty
- Uzytamak
- Verkhnekhozyatovo
- Verkhniye Termy
- Verkhny
- Vishnevka
- Yabalakly
- Yashikey
- Yengalyshevo
- Yeremeyevo
- Zavodyanka
- Zubovo

== Davlekanovsky District ==
Rural localities in Davlekanovsky District:

- Akhunovo
- Alexandrovka
- Alga
- Alga
- Almetovo
- Ayukhanovo
- Bakhcha
- Balto-Ivanovka
- Batraki
- Berezovka
- Bik-Karmaly
- Bishkain
- Burangulovo
- Chapayevo
- Chernigovka
- Chuyunchi
- Chuyunchi-Nikolayevka
- Doroshevka
- Druzhba
- Dyurtyuli
- Faridunovka
- Filippovka
- Gorchaki
- Gumerovo
- Imay-Karmaly
- Iskandarovo
- Ismagilovo
- Ivangorod
- Ivanovka
- Kadyrgulovo
- Kalinovka
- Kamchalytamak
- Karanbash
- Karatal
- Kazangulovo
- Khotimlya
- Khusainovo
- Kidryachevo
- Kirovo
- Komintern
- Komsomolsky
- Krasnaya Polyana
- Kupoyarovo
- Kuryatmasovo
- Kuzminovka
- Leninsky
- Mikhaylovka
- Mikyashevo
- Musagitovo
- Novoakkulayevo
- Novoivanovka
- Novomryasovo
- Novosharipovo
- Novoyanbekovo
- Novoyapparovo
- Olgovka
- Politotdel
- Polyakovka
- Rassvet
- Raush
- Rayevo
- Romanovka
- Rublyovka
- Sergiopol
- Shestayevo
- Shestopalovka
- Sidorovka
- Sokolovka
- Starokurmankeyevo
- Staromryasovo
- Starosharipovo
- Staroyapparovo
- Sultanovka
- Tambovka
- Tashly-Sharipovo
- Tashlytamak
- Tavrichanka
- Tuksanbay
- Urtatau
- Volynka
- Voroshilovo
- Vperyod
- Vyazovka
- Yangi-Turmush
- Yapar-Yanbekovo
- Yaskain
- Zarya

== Duvansky District ==
Rural localities in Duvansky District:

- Abdrashitovo
- Anzyak
- Ariyevo
- Burtsevka
- Chertan
- Duvan
- Gladkikh
- Ignashkino
- Kadyrovo
- Kalmash
- Karakulevo
- Komsomolsky
- Koshelevka
- Kutrasovka
- Lemazy
- Marzhangulovo
- Matavla
- Mesyagutovo
- Meteli
- Mikhaylovka
- Mitrofanovka
- Mulkatovo
- Nizhneye Absalyamovo
- Novokhalilovo
- Novomikhaylovka
- Oktyabrsky
- Ozero
- Pobeda
- Potapovka
- Rukhtino
- Safonovka
- Salyevka
- Semerikovka
- Sikiyaz
- Starokhalilovo
- Tastuba
- Ulkundy
- Ust-Ayaz
- Ust-Yuguz
- Verkhneye Absalyamovo
- Voznesenka
- Yaroslavka
- Yelantub
- Yezhovka
- Zaimka

== Dyurtyulinsky District ==
Rural localities in Dyurtyulinsky District:

- Akaneyevo
- Angasyak
- Argamak
- Argysh
- Asyanovo
- Atachevo
- Atsuyarovo
- Ayukashevo
- Bargata
- Bargyzbash
- Baygildy
- Bishnarat
- Cherlak
- Chishma
- Eldyak
- Gublyukuchukovo
- Gulyukovo
- Ildus
- Imay-Utarovo
- Iskush
- Ismailovo
- Ivachevo
- Ivanayevo
- Kaishevo
- Karalachuk
- Kazaklarovo
- Kazy-Yeldyak
- Kirgizki
- Kuchergich
- Kukkuyanovo
- Kushulevo
- Malobishkurazovo
- Mamadalevo
- Manyazybash
- Mayadyk
- Minishty
- Moskovo
- Nazitamak
- Nizhnealkashevo
- Nizhneatashevo
- Nizhnekargino
- Nizhnemancharovo
- Novobadrakovo
- Novobiktovo
- Novoishmetovo
- Novokangyshevo
- Novourtayevo
- Novy Ural
- Pokrovka
- Sabanayevo
- Salparovo
- Semiletka
- Sergeyevka
- Sikalikul
- Starobaishevo
- Starobaltachevo
- Starokangyshevo
- Starosultanbekovo
- Starourtayevo
- Staroyantuzovo
- Sukkulovo
- Sultanbekovo
- Takarlikovo
- Tamakovo
- Tarasovka
- Tash-Yelga
- Tashtau
- Taubash-Badrakovo
- Taymurzino
- Turbek
- Uchpili
- Urman-Asty
- Uspenovka
- Utkineyevo
- Uyady
- Venetsiya
- Verkhnealkashevo
- Verkhnekargino
- Veyalochnaya
- Yukalikul
- Yukalikulevo
- Yuntiryak
- Yusupovo
- Zeylevo
- Zitembyak

== Fyodorovsky District ==
Rural localities in Fyodorovsky District

- Akbulatovo
- Alyoshkino
- Atyashevo
- Aytugan-Durasovo
- Bala-Chetyrman
- Balykly
- Balyklybashevo
- Batyrovo
- Bazelevo
- Bulyakay
- Dedovo
- Deniskino
- Fyodorovka
- Gavrilovka
- Gavrilovka
- Gogolevka
- Goncharovka
- Gorokhovka
- Gritsayevka
- Gumbetovo
- Ilyinovka
- Ilyinovka
- Ishmukhametovo
- Ivanovka
- Izhbulyak
- Karalachik
- Kazanka
- Kiryushkino
- Klyuchevka
- Kuzminovka
- Lvovka
- Maganevka
- Mikhaylovka
- Nikolayevka
- Nizhny Alyshtan
- Novaya Derevnya
- Novomikhaylovka
- Novonikolayevka
- Novosofiyevka
- Novosyolka
- Novotroitskoye
- Novoyaushevo
- Orlovka
- Petrovka
- Petrovka
- Pokrovka
- Polynovka
- Russky Sukhoy Izyak
- Saitovo
- Sashino
- Sergeyevka
- Staronikolayevka
- Stary Chetyrman
- Tatarsky Sukhoy Izyak
- Tenyayevo
- Ulyadarovka
- Verkhneyaushevo
- Verkhny Alyshtan
- Verkhnyaya Mityukovka
- Veselovka
- Yuldashevo
- Yurkovka
- Yurmaty
- Zlatoustovka

== Gafuriysky District ==
Rural localities in Gafuriysky District:

- Abdullino
- Akhmetka
- Aktashevo
- Antonovka
- Arkhangelskoye
- Baimbetovo
- Bakrak
- Bazikovo
- Beloozyorovka
- Beloye Ozero
- Bely Kamen
- Berezovka
- Bolshoy Utyash
- Burly
- Burunovka
- Daryino
- Derevnya pchelosovkhoza
- Dmitriyevka
- Dmitriyevka
- Ibragimovo
- Igenchekyar
- Iktisad
- Imendyashevo
- Imyannik
- Inzelga
- Ivanovka
- Karagayevo
- Karan-Yelga
- Karly
- Kovardy
- Krasnodubrovsk
- Krasnousolsky
- Krasny Oktyabr
- Kulkanovo
- Kurgashla
- Kurmantau
- Kurorta
- Kutluguza
- Kuzma-Alexandrovka
- Kyzyl Yar
- Lugovaya
- Maly Utyash
- Mendim
- Mikhaylovka
- Mrakovo
- Muraz
- Nekrasovka
- Nizhny Tashbukan
- Novaya Aldashla
- Novokaramyshevo
- Novosemyonovka
- Novotaishevo
- Novotroyevka
- Novozirikovo
- Novyye Burly
- Novyye Kovardy
- Noyabrevka
- Pavlovka
- Petropavlovka
- Pobeda
- Rodina
- Russky Saskul
- Sabayevo
- Saitbaba
- Sofyino
- Sredny Utyash
- Sukhodol
- Tabynskoye
- Taishevo
- Tash-Asty
- Tashla
- Tatarsky Saskul
- Tolparovo
- Tsapalovka
- Tugay
- Tugayevo
- Ural
- Usmanovo
- Utyakovo
- Uvarovka
- Uzbyakovo
- Verkhny Tashbukan
- Voinovka
- Yakty-Kul
- Yangiskain
- Yavgildy
- Yulukovo
- Yurmash
- Yuzimanovo
- Zarechny
- Zilim-Karanovo
- Zirikly
- Zirikovo

== Iglinsky District ==
Rural localities in Iglinsky District:

- Akberdino
- Alatorka
- Amirovo
- Amitovo
- Ashinsky
- Askanysh
- Austrum
- Avangard
- Balazhi
- Baltika
- Barantsevo
- Beloretsk
- Bibakhtino
- Blokhino
- Bogdanovskoye
- Bratsky
- Budennovsky
- Bulan-Turgan
- Chkalovskoye
- Chuvash-Kubovo
- Chyorny Klyuch
- Fatkullino
- Frunze
- Iglino
- Iskra
- Ivano-Kazanka
- Kalininskoye
- Kalininsky
- Kaltovka
- Kaltymanovo
- Karamaly
- Kazayak
- Kazayak-Khusnullino
- Kazayak-Kutush
- Kirovskoye
- Kirovsky
- Klyashevo
- Klyuchevskoye
- Kommunar
- Krasny Klyuch
- Krasny Voskhod
- Krasny Yar
- Kudeyevsky
- Kurshaki
- Kushkul
- Kuznetsovka
- Lemeza
- Leninskoye
- Leninskoye
- Leninsky
- Malaya Ashinka
- Managora
- Maysky
- Mikhaylovka
- Minzitarovo
- Monchazy
- Nizhniye Lemezy
- Novaya Beryozovka
- Novobakayevo
- Novokubovo
- Novosimskoye
- Novotroitskoye
- Novoufimsk
- Novy
- Okhlebinino
- Oktyabrskoye
- Oktyabrsky
- Olginskoye
- Orlovka
- Pervomayskoye
- Peschano-Lobovo
- Petrovo-Fedorovka
- Petrovskoye
- Podolsky
- Pokrovka
- Postupalovo
- Preobrazhenka
- Preobrazhenskaya
- Pushkinskoye
- Pyatiletka
- Pyatiletka
- Rasmikeyevo
- Rassvet
- Rezvovo
- Rodniki
- Sart-Lobovo
- Shaksha
- Shelany
- Shipovo
- Shukteyevo
- Simskoye
- Slutka
- Sotsialistichesky
- Spasskoye
- Staraya Kudeyevka
- Starokubovo
- Stary Yurmash
- Staryye Karashidy
- Subakayevo
- Tashly-Yelga
- Tau
- Taush
- Tavtimanovo
- Tikeyevo
- Turbasly
- Tyulko-Tamak
- Ukteyevo
- Ulu-Karamaly
- Ulu-Telyak
- Ulu-Yelan
- Urman
- Urozhay
- Urunda
- Ustyugovka
- Verny
- Vesyoly
- Voroshilovskoye
- Voznesenka
- Vysokaya
- Yagodnaya
- Yasnaya Polyana
- Yeleninsky
- Yuremis-Nadezhdinskoye
- Zagorskoye
- Zavety Ilyicha

== Ilishevsky District ==
Rural localities in Ilishevsky District:

- Abdullino
- Akkuzevo
- Anachevo
- Andreyevka
- Ashmanovo
- Baza-Kuyanovo
- Bazitamak
- Bishkurayevo
- Bulyak
- Buraly
- Chuy-Atasevo
- Dyumeyevo
- Gremuchy Klyuch
- Gremuchy Klyuch
- Gruzdevka
- Ibragim
- Igmetovo
- Ilishevo
- Ilyakshide
- Irmashevo
- Isametovo
- Isanbayevo
- Ishkarovo
- Ishteryakovo
- Iteyevo
- Kadyrovo
- Kalinino
- Karabashevo
- Kayenlyk
- Kipchakovo
- Knyaz-Yelga
- Krasnoyarovo
- Krasny Oktyabr
- Kuzhbakhty
- Kyzyl-Bayrak
- Kyzyl-Kuch
- Kyzyl-Yulduz
- Layashty
- Lena
- Malo-Bishkurayevo
- Malotazeyevo
- Mari-Meneuz
- Marino
- Nizhnecherekulevo
- Nizhneyarkeyevo
- Novoatashevo
- Novokuktovo
- Novomedvedevo
- Novonadyrovo
- Rsayevo
- Saitkulovo
- Shammetovo
- Shidali
- Starobiktovo
- Starokirgizovo
- Starokuktovo
- Staronadyrovo
- Starotatyshevo
- Syngryanovo
- Syultino
- Tashchishma
- Tashkichi
- Tatarsky Meneuz
- Tazeyevo
- Telekeyevo
- Telepanovo
- Tukay-Tamak
- Tupeyevo
- Turachi
- Tyuliganovo
- Ulu-Yalan
- Urmetovo
- Urnyakovo
- Uyandykovo
- Verkhnecherekulevo
- Verkhnemancharovo
- Verkhneyarkeyevo
- Verkhneye Yuldashevo
- Vostok
- Votsky Meneuz
- Yabalakovo
- Yantuganovo
- Yunny
- Zyaylevo

== Ishimbaysky District ==
Rural localities in Ishimbaysky District:

- Akhmerovo
- Alakayevo
- Almaly
- Anikeyevsky
- Aptikovo
- Arlarovo
- Armetrakhimovo
- Asiyalan
- Avangard
- Aznayevo
- Bayguzino
- Berdyshla
- Biksyanovo
- Bogdanovka
- Bolshebaikovo
- Gumerovo
- Ibrayevo
- Isheyevo
- Ishimovo
- Iskisyakovo
- Isyakayevo
- Kabyasovo
- Kalmakovo
- Kalu-Ayry
- Kanakayevo
- Karasyovka
- Karayganovo
- Kashalakbash
- Khazinovo
- Kinzebulatovo
- Kinzekeyevo
- Kiyaukovo
- Kozlovsky
- Kulgunino
- Kuznetsovsky
- Kuzyanovo
- Kyzyl Oktyabr
- Kyzyl-Yulduz
- Lesnoye
- Makarovo
- Malobaikovo
- Malomaksyutovo
- Mikhaylovka
- Mikhaylovka
- Nizhnearmetovo
- Novoaptikovo
- Novogeorgiyevka
- Novoivanovka
- Novonikolayevka
- Novosaitovo
- Oktyabr
- Osipovka
- Pavlovka
- Petrovskoye
- Podgorny
- Podlesny
- Romadanovka
- Salikhovo
- Sargayevo
- Sayranovo
- Shikhan
- Skvorchikha
- Slobodka
- Solyony
- Starosaitovo
- Tatyanovka
- Timashevka
- Torgaska
- Urazbayevo
- Urman-Bishkadak
- Urnyak
- Vasilyevka
- Verkhnearmetovo
- Verkhneitkulovo
- Verkhotor
- Vostok
- Yaltaran
- Yangi-Aul
- Yangi-Yurt
- Yanurusovo
- Yar-Bishkadak
- Yasheltau
- Yekaterinovka
- Yuldashevo
- Ziganovka

== Kaltasinsky District ==
Rural localities in Kaltasinsky District:

- Akineyevo
- Aktuganovo
- Alexandrovka
- Amzibash
- Babayevo
- Barsukovo
- Baryaza
- Bolshekachakovo
- Bolshekurazovo
- Bolshetuganeyevo
- Bolshoy Keltey
- Bratovshchina
- Buraly
- Chashkino
- Chilibeyevo
- Chumara
- Gareyevka
- Grafskoye
- Ilchibay
- Kachkinturay
- Kalegino
- Kalmash
- Kalmiyabash
- Kaltasy
- Kangulovo
- Kiyebak
- Kokush
- Koyanovo
- Kozloyalovo
- Krasnokholmsky
- Krasny Kholm
- Krasny Yar
- Kuchash
- Kugarchino
- Kurgak
- Kushnya
- Kuterem
- Kuyanovo
- Kyrpy
- Malokachakovo
- Malokurazovo
- Mariysky Bikshik
- Nadezhdino
- Naratovo
- Nizhny Kachmash
- Nizhny Tykhtem
- Norkino
- Novokilbakhtino
- Novotokranovo
- Novoyashevo
- Novy Amzibash
- Novy Ashit
- Novy Atkul
- Novy Oryebash
- Rodniki
- Saulyashbash
- Sazovo
- Semyonkino
- Sharipovo
- Sredny Kachmash
- Staroturayevo
- Staroyashevo
- Stary Oryebash
- Staryye Kaltasy
- Sultanayevo
- Tat-Bikshik
- Toykino
- Tynbakhtino
- Tyuldi
- U-Yal
- Vanyshevo
- Vasilovo
- Vasilyevo
- Verkhny Kachmash
- Verkhny Tykhtem
- Yasnaya Polyana

== Karaidelsky District ==
Rural localities in Karaidelsky District:

- Abdullino
- Abutalipovo
- Abyzovo
- Alexandrovka
- Aminevo
- Arkaul
- Artakul
- Askish
- Atamanovka
- Atnyash
- Atnyashkino
- Bartym
- Bayki
- Bayki-Yunusovo
- Baykibashevo
- Bazilevsky
- Berdyash
- Biyaz
- Burkhanovka
- Chapash
- Chebykovo
- Chemayevo
- Davlyatovka
- Deushevo
- Dubrovka
- Dyurtyuli
- Gornoye
- Imyanovo
- Itkuli
- Kadysi
- Kainchak
- Kaltasy
- Kanton
- Karaidel
- Karayar
- Karysh-Yelga
- Khalilovo
- Khoroshayevo
- Kirzya
- Komsomolsky
- Krasny Uryush
- Krush
- Kurtlykul
- Kuyanchi
- Maginsk
- Malikovo
- Mata
- Mryasimovo
- Mullkayevo
- Nagretdinovo
- Nikolo-Kazanka
- Nizhniye Balmazy
- Nizhny Suyan
- Novomullakayevo
- Novosyolka
- Novoyansaitovo
- Novy Akbulyak
- Novy Berdyash
- Oktyabrsky
- Ozerki
- Podlubovo
- Poperechnaya Gora
- Razdolye
- Sabankul
- Sedyash
- Sedyash-Nagayevo
- Shamratovo
- Shaushak
- Sosnovy Bor
- Starootkustino
- Stary Akbulyak
- Staryye Bagazy
- Suleymanovo
- Surda
- Suyundyukovo
- Tat-Kudash
- Tatarsky Uryush
- Tayga
- Taykash
- Tegermenevo
- Teter-Klyuch
- Turnovo
- Tuyushevo
- Urazayevo
- Urazbakhty
- Urgush
- Uryush-Bitullino
- Ust-Bartaga
- Ust-Sukhoyaz
- Verkhny Suyan
- Yakupovo
- Yanbak
- Yanbatyrovka
- Yavgildino
- Yuldashevo
- Yuryuzan
- Zinatovka
- Zuyevka

== Karmaskalinsky District ==
Rural localities in Karmaskalinsky District:

- Abdullino
- Advokatovka
- Adzitarovo
- Akkul
- Aksakovo
- Aktyuba
- Alaygirovo
- Alexandrovka
- Alexandrovka
- Alexeyevka
- Almalyk
- Antonovka
- Arslanovo
- Baltino
- Beketovo
- Belsky
- Beryozovka
- Bishaul-Ungarovo
- Bochkaryovka
- Bulyakay
- Buzovyazbash
- Buzovyazy
- Chishma
- Derevnya razyezda Ibragimovo
- Derevnya stantsii Kabakovo
- Derevnya stantsii Sakharozavodskaya
- Dmitriyevka
- Georgiyevka
- Grachyovka
- Ibragimovo
- Ilteryakovo
- Iltuganovo
- Ivanovka
- Kabakovo
- Kachevan
- Kalmovka
- Kamyshlinka
- Karakul
- Karlaman
- Karlamanbash
- Karmaskaly
- Konstantinovka
- Krasnoyarovo
- Kullyarovo
- Kulushevo
- Kushkul
- Kustugulovo
- Kuyashkino
- Lyakhovo
- Malayevo
- Matrosovka
- Mikhaylovka
- Mukayevo
- Muksinovo
- Mursyakovo
- Murzino
- Naberezhny
- Nikiforovka
- Nikitino
- Nikolayevka
- Nizhnetimkino
- Nizhny Tyukun
- Novoaktashevo
- Novoalexeyevka
- Novoandreyevka
- Novobabichevo
- Novokazanka
- Novomusino
- Novomusino
- Novopetrovka
- Novotroitsk
- Novy Bishaul
- Novy Kuganak
- Novyye Kiyeshki
- Oktyabr
- Orlovka
- Podlubovo
- Pokrovka
- Pribelsky
- Rakitovka
- Romanovka
- Sakhayevo
- Salzigutovo
- Sarsaz
- Sart-Chishma
- Sart-Nauruzovo
- Savaleyevo
- Sharipkulovo
- Shaymuratovo
- Sikhonkino
- Simsky
- Smolenka
- Staroaktashevo
- Staroalexeyevka
- Starobabichevo
- Staromusino
- Staroshareyevo
- Staroyanbekovo
- Staryye Kiyeshki
- Sulu-Kuak
- Suuk-Chishma
- Syskanovo
- Tansaitovo
- Tausengirovo
- Tazlarovo
- Tubyak-Tazlarovo
- Ulukulevo
- Ulyanovka
- Ural
- Utyaganovo
- Varshavka
- Verkhnetimkino
- Verkhneuglichino
- Verkhny Tyukun
- Vyazovka
- Yakovlevka
- Yakty-Kul
- Yakty-Yalan
- Yefremkino
- Yelizavetino

== Khaybullinsky District ==
Rural localities in Khaybullinsky District:

- 1st Murzino
- Abdulnasyrovo
- Abubakirovo
- Adel
- Aknazarovo
- Aktashevo
- Akyar
- Akyulovo
- Alibayevskoye
- Antingan
- Bakalovka
- Bayguskarovo
- Bolsheabishevo
- Bolshearslangulovo
- Buribay
- Buzavlyk
- Galiakhmetovo
- Ilyachevo
- Isyangildino
- Ivanovka
- Komsomolsk
- Makan
- Maloarslangulovo
- Mambetovo
- Mikhaylovka
- Nizhneismakovo
- Novopetrovskoye
- Novopetrovskoye
- Novoukrainka
- Novy Zirgan
- Perevolochan
- Pervomayskoye
- Petropavlovsky
- Podolsk
- Pugachyovo
- Rafikovo
- Sadovy
- Sagitovo
- Sakmar-Nazargulovo
- Samarskoye
- Savelyevka
- Stepnoy
- Tanatar
- Tashtugay
- Tatyr-Uzyak
- Ufimsky
- Urazbayevo
- Urnyak
- Valitovo
- Vozdvizhenka

== Kiginsky District ==
Rural localities in Kiginsky District:

- Abdrezyakovo
- Abzaevo
- Alaguzovo
- Arslanovo
- Asylguzhino
- Dushanbekovo
- Ibrayevo
- Idrisovo
- Igenchelyar
- Kandakovka
- Kiseik
- Kizetamak
- Kulbakovo
- Kulmetovo
- Kurgashevo
- Leuza
- Masyakovo
- Nizhniye Kigi
- Novomukhametovo
- Oktyabr
- Parizh
- Pervomaysky
- Sagirovo
- Saragulovo
- Staromukhametovo
- Sultanovka
- Syurbayevo
- Tuguzly
- Tukayevo
- Tyoply Klyuch
- Urak
- Vakiyarovo
- Verkhniye Kigi
- Vyazovka
- Yagunovo
- Yelanlino
- Yukalikulevo
- Yunusovo
- Yusupovo

== Krasnokamsky District ==
Rural localities in Krasnokamsky District:

- Apasevo
- Arlan
- Ashit
- Bachkitau
- Baryazibash
- Biktimirovo
- Bolshaya Amzya
- Burnyush
- Chabayevka
- Derevnya Sharipovskogo uchastka
- Ilistanbetovo
- Ishmetovo
- Ivanovka
- Kadrekovo
- Kaltayevo
- Kariyevo
- Karyakino
- Kiremetovo
- Kirgizovo
- Kuperbash
- Kutlinka
- Kuvakino
- Kuyanovo
- Kuzgovo
- Manyak
- Mozhary
- Mryasovo
- Murzino
- Muzyak
- Nikolo-Beryozovka
- Nikolskoye
- Nizhnyaya Tatya
- Novaya Bura
- Novaya Mushta
- Novobaltachevo
- Novokabanovo
- Novokhazino
- Novonagayevo
- Novourazayevo
- Novy Aktanyshbash
- Novy Burtyuk
- Novy Chuganak
- Novy Kainlyk
- Novy Tatysh
- Novy Yanzigit
- Razdolye
- Redkino
- Sabanchi
- Saklovo
- Sauzbash
- Sauzovo
- Shushnur
- Staraya Bura
- Staraya Mushta
- Starourazayevo
- Staroyanzigitovo
- Stary Ashit
- Stary Burtyuk
- Stary Kainlyk
- Taktalachuk
- Urtaul
- Vedreseyevo
- Vorobyovo
- Yanaul
- Yanaul
- Yanguznarat
- Yenaktayevo
- Zubovka

== Kugarchinsky District ==
Rural localities in Kugarchinsky District:

- 1st Tukatovo
- 1st Tupchanovo
- 2nd Tukatovo
- Alexandrovka
- Alimgulovo
- Almyasovo
- Andreyevka
- Aralbay
- Ardatovo
- Aygay-Mursalay
- Aznagulovo
- Bagdashkino
- Bash-Berkutovo
- Bekechevo
- Bekeshevo
- Berkutovo
- Bikbulatovo
- Bustubayevo
- Chernigovsky
- Daut-Kayupovo
- Davletkulovo 1-ye
- Davletshinsky
- Gavrilovka
- Gavrilovsky
- Gazis
- Ibragimovo
- Ibrayevo
- Igubayevo
- Iknazarovo
- Irtyubyak
- Isimovo
- Izhberdino
- Kadyrovo
- Kaldarovo
- Kanakachevo
- Karan
- Kaskinovo
- Khlebodarovka
- Khudayberdino
- Kirova
- Krasny Yar
- Kugarchi
- Kurt-Yelga
- Kuzminovka
- Kyzyltash
- Leonovsky
- Maloisimovo
- Maxyutovo
- Mrakovo
- Mryaushlinsky
- Mukachevo
- Muradym
- Musino
- Narbutovo
- Nazarkino
- Nizhnebikkuzino
- Nizhnesapashevo
- Nizhnesyuryubayevo
- Nizhneye Sazovo
- Nizhnyaya Mayka
- Novokhvalynsky
- Novonikolayevskoye
- Novopetrovskoye
- Novopokrovskoye
- Novosapashevo
- Nukayevo
- Petropavlovka
- Poboishche
- Podgornoye
- Progress
- Saitkulovo
- Salikhovo
- Sapykovo
- Saratovsky
- Satlyki
- Semirechye
- Semyono-Pokrovskoye
- Serp i Molot
- Shcherbaki
- Siksanbayevo
- Simbirsky
- Staro-Almyasovo
- Starokhvalynsky
- Sultangulovo
- Syuren
- Tangaur
- Tavakanovo
- Tlyaumbetovo
- Tuyembetovo
- Tyulebayevo
- Tyulyabayevo
- Ulutup
- Urakayevo
- Valitovo
- Vasilyevsky
- Verkhnebikkuzino
- Verkhnemursalyayevo
- Verkhnesanzyapovo
- Verkhnesyuryubayevo
- Verkhneye Sazovo
- Volostnovka
- Voskresenskoye
- Yadgarovo
- Yakshimbetovo
- Yalchino
- Yalchino
- Yanaul
- Yetebulak
- Yulbashevo
- Yuldybay
- Yumaguzino
- Zireklya

== Kumertau ==
Rural localities in Kumertau urban okrug:

- Alexeyevka
- Ira
- Mayachny

== Kushnarenkovsky District ==
Rural localities in Kushnarenkovsky District:

- Akhlystino
- Akhmetovo
- Akhta
- Bakayevo
- Bardovka
- Baytally
- Beykeyevo
- Chirsha-Tartysh
- Derevnya Uchkhoza selkhoztekhnikuma
- Gorny
- Gumerovo
- Gurgureyevo
- Gurovka
- Ibragimovo
- Ilikovo
- Ilmurzino
- Islanovo
- Kaltayevo
- Kanly
- Karacha-Yelga
- Karatyaki
- Kazarma
- Kerenyovo
- Kudushlibashevo
- Kupayevo
- Kushnarenkovo
- Kuvykovo
- Kyzylkuper
- Mamyakovo
- Mars
- Matveyevo
- Mavlyutovo
- Medvedyorovo
- Nizhneakbashevo
- Nizhnesaitovo
- Novoakbashevo
- Novobakayevo
- Novobaskakovo
- Novogumerovo
- Novokurmashevo
- Novyye Kamyshly
- Novyye Tukmakly
- Pervushino
- Petropavlovo
- Rasmekeyevo
- Saitovo
- Sharipovo
- Sredneakbashevo
- Staraya Murtaza
- Starobaskakovo
- Starogumerovo
- Starokurmashevo
- Staroyumranovo
- Staryye Kamyshly
- Staryye Tukmakly
- Subay
- Sultanayevo
- Syultyup
- Taganayevo
- Taraberdino
- Tolbazy
- Uguzevo
- Ural
- Verkhneakbashevo
- Verkhnesaitovo
- Voyetskoye
- Yakupovo
- Yamskoye
- Yaparka

== Kuyurgazinsky District ==
Rural localities in Kuyurgazinsky District:

- Abdulovo
- Aksarovo
- Alexandrovsky
- Annovka
- Arslano-Amekachevo
- Aysuak
- Bakhmut
- Balza
- Bugulchan
- Dedovsky
- Gorny Klyuch
- Ilkineyevo
- Ivanovka
- Kanchura
- Karagay
- Karayevo
- Kholmogory
- Kholodny Klyuch
- Kovalyovka
- Krasny Mayak
- Krasny Vostok
- Krivle-Ilyushkino
- Kunakbayevo
- Kutluyulovo
- Kuyurgazy
- Kuznetsovsky
- Kyzyl-Mayak
- Lena
- Malomusino
- Mambetkulovo
- Maryevka
- Mikhaylovka
- Molokanovo
- Muraptal
- Mutal
- Nizhneye Babalarovo
- Novaya Otrada
- Novaya Uralka
- Novoallaberdino
- Novokaltayevo
- Novomikhaylovka
- Novomuraptalovo
- Novomusino
- Novotaymasovo
- Novotroitskaya
- Novoyadgarovskaya
- Novoyamashevo
- Olkhovka
- Pavlovka
- Pchyolka
- Pokrovka
- Raznomoyka
- Samartsevo
- Sandin 2-y
- Sandin
- Savelyevka
- Shabagish
- Sredneye Babalarovo
- Staraya Otrada
- Staromuraptalovo
- Surakayevo
- Svoboda
- Taymasovo
- Timerbayevo
- Tyukanovo 2-ye
- Ulyanovka
- Verkhneye Babalarovo
- Yakshimbetovo
- Yakupovo
- Yakutovo
- Yalchikayevo
- Yamangulovo
- Yamansarovo
- Yangi-Aul
- Yangi-Yul
- Yazlav
- Yegoryevka
- Yermolayevo
- Yumaguzino
- Yushatyrka
- Znamenka
- Zyak-Ishmetovo

== Mechetlinsky District ==
Rural localities in Mechetlinsky District:

- Abdrakhimovo
- Abdullino
- Alegazovo
- Ay
- Ayupovo
- Azangulovo
- Azikeyevo
- Bolshaya Oka
- Bolshekyzylbayevo
- Bolsheustyikinskoye
- Buranchino
- Burgadzhino
- Burtakovka
- Duvan-Mechetlino
- Gumerovo
- Ishalino
- Karanayevo
- Klyuchevoy
- Kurgatovo
- Kurshalino
- Kutashevo
- Lemez-Tamak
- Malokyzylbayevo
- Maloustyinskoye
- Melekasovo
- Nizhneye Bobino
- Nizhneye Tukbayevo
- Novomeshcherovo
- Novomuslyumovo
- Novoyaushevo
- Oktyabrsk
- Sabanakovo
- Salzigutovo
- Sosnovka
- Srednyaya Oka
- Staromeshcherovo
- Stepnoy
- Suleymanovo
- Taishevo
- Takino
- Telyashevo
- Timirbayevo
- Timiryakovo
- Verkhneye Bobino
- Yasinovo
- Yelanysh
- Yulayevo
- Yunusovo
- Zhvakino

== Meleuzovsky District ==
Rural localities in Meleuzovsky District:

- Abitovo
- Aknazarovo
- Alexandrovka
- Andreyevsky
- Antonovka
- Apasovo
- Aptrakovo
- Araslanovo
- Aytugan
- Basurmanovka
- Belsky
- Beregovka
- Beryozovsky
- Bogorodskoye
- Danilovka
- Daryino
- Davletkulovo
- Dmitriyevka
- Dmitriyevka
- Ishtuganovo
- Islamgulovo
- Itkuchukovo
- Ivanovka
- Karan
- Kashalya
- Khasanovo
- Khlebodarovka
- Kizray
- Klimovka
- Kochkar
- Konarevka
- Korneyevka
- Krasnogorsky
- Krasny Yar
- Kutlubulatovo
- Kutushevo
- Kuzminskoye
- Malomukachevo
- Malosharipovo
- Mikhaylovka
- Mullagulovo
- Mutayevo
- Nizhnetashevo
- Nordovka
- Novaya Kazanovka
- Novaya Slobodka
- Novotroyevka
- Nugush
- Nurdavletovo
- Ozerki
- Pervomayskaya
- Petropavlovka
- Petrovsky
- Pokrovka
- Rassvet
- Romadanovka
- Romanovka
- Sabashevo
- Saitovsky
- Samaro-Ivanovka
- Samarovka
- Samoylovka
- Sarlak
- Saryshevo
- Semyonovka
- Sergeyevka
- Seryat
- Smakovo
- Staraya Kazanovka
- Staromusino
- Stolyarovka
- Sukharevka
- Syrtlanovo
- Tamyan
- Tashlykul
- Terekla
- Tikhonovka
- Troitskoye
- Tumachino
- Tyulyakovo
- Uzya
- Varvarino
- Vasilyevka
- Verkhneyuldashevo
- Voskresenskoye
- Vostochny
- Yakty-Kul
- Yangy-Aul
- Yumakovo
- Zirgan
- Zirikovo

== Mishkinsky District ==
Rural localities in Mishkinsky District:

- Andreyevka
- Babayevo
- Bash-Baybakovo
- Baymurzino
- Bayturovo
- Bikshikovo
- Biryubash
- Bolshesukhoyazovo
- Bolshiye Shady
- Buklendy
- Chebykovo
- Churayevo
- Ilikovo
- Irsayevo
- Ishimovo
- Ishtybayevo
- Izimarino
- Kalmazan
- Kameyevo
- Karasimovo
- Kargino
- Kayrakovo
- Kigazytamakovo
- Kochkildino
- Krasny Klyuch
- Kreshchenskoye
- Kurmanayevo
- Kyzyl-Yul
- Leninskoye
- Lepeshkino
- Levitsky
- Malonakaryakovo
- Malyye Shady
- Mavlyutovo
- Mayevka
- Mishkino
- Mitryayevo
- Nizhnesorokino
- Novoakbulatovo
- Novokarachevo
- Novokilmetovo
- Novoklyuchevo
- Novonikolayevka
- Novosafarovo
- Novotroitskoye
- Novovaskino
- Oktyabr
- Ozerki
- Rayevka
- Refandy
- Russkoye Baybakovo
- Sabayevo
- Sosnovka
- Staroakbulatovo
- Staroarzamatovo
- Staroatnagulovo
- Starokulchubayevo
- Staronakaryakovo
- Starovaskino
- Tatarbayevo
- Terekeyevo
- Tigirmenevo
- Toktarovo
- Tynbayevo
- Ukozyash
- Uryady
- Verkhnesorokino
- Voskhod
- Yanagushevo
- Yandyganovo
- Yelyshevo
- Yubaykulevo

== Miyakinsky District ==
Rural localities in Miyakinsky District:

- 2nd Miyakibashevo
- Abishevo
- Aitovo
- Akyar
- Alexeyevka
- Andreyevka
- Anyasevo
- Bayazitovo
- Baytimirovo
- Bikkulovo
- Bogdanovo
- Bolshiye Karkaly
- Chayka
- Chetyrbash
- Chiryashtamak
- Chishmy
- Chiyale
- Chulpan
- Churayevo
- Chyatay-Burzyan
- Dneprovka
- Dubrovka
- Ikhtisad
- Ilchigulovo
- Islamgulovo
- Kacheganovo
- Kamyshly
- Kanbekovo
- Karan-Kunkas
- Karyshevo
- Kashkarovo
- Keken-Vasilyevka
- Kirgiz-Miyaki
- Komsomolsky
- Kozhay-Semyonovka
- Kul-Kanas
- Kultay-Karan
- Kurmanaybash
- Kyzyl-Chishma
- Malyye Gayny
- Malyye Karkaly
- Maximovka
- Mayak
- Meneuztamak
- Miyakitamak
- Narystau
- Nikolayevka
- Nikolskoye
- Novoalexeyevka
- Novofyodorovka
- Novomikhaylovka
- Novonikolayevka
- Novy Mir
- Novyye Ishly
- Novyye Karmaly
- Novyye Omelniki
- Petropavlovka
- Rassvet
- Rodnikovka
- Russkoye Ursayevo
- Sadovy
- Safarovo
- Satayevo
- Satyyevo
- Sergeyevka
- Shatmantamak
- Shatra
- Smorodinovka
- Sofiyevka
- Staryye Balgazi
- Sukkul-Mikhaylovka
- Tamyan-Taymas
- Taukay-Gayna
- Timyashevo
- Tuksanbayevo
- Tuyash
- Umanka
- Urnyak
- Urshak
- Urshakbashkaramaly
- Uspekh
- Uyazybashevo
- Verkhotsenko
- Yashelkul
- Yashlyar
- Yenebey-Ursayevo
- Yerlykovo
- Zaypekul
- Zidigan
- Zildyarovo
- Zirikly
- Ziriklykul

== Neftekamsk ==
Rural localities in Neftekamsk urban okrug:

- Amzya
- Chishma
- Energetik
- Krym-Sarayevo
- Marino
- Tashkinovo

== Nurimanovsky District ==
Rural localities in Nurimanovsky District:

- Bash-Shidy
- Baygildino
- Baykal
- Bikmurzino
- Bolshetenkashevo
- Bolshiye Shidy
- Chandar
- Churashevo
- Gizyatovo
- Ishmuratovo
- Istrikovo
- Kargino
- Kaznatash
- Klyuch Bedeyevo
- Krasnaya Gorka
- Krasny Klyuch
- Kushkulevo
- Kyzyl-Barzhau
- Malotenkashevo
- Malyye Shidy
- Nikolskoye
- Nimislyarovo
- Novobedeyevo
- Novobiryuchevo
- Novoisayevo
- Novokulevo
- Novy Subay
- Nur
- Pavlovka
- Pervomaysk
- Ryatush
- Sargayazovo
- Sarva
- Satlyk
- Starobedeyevo
- Starobiryuchevo
- Staroisayevo
- Starokulevo
- Stary Biyaz
- Uraklino
- Urman
- Ust-Saldybash
- Ustye Yaman-Yelgi
- Uyankul
- Verkhnekirovsky
- Voznesensky
- Yaman-Port
- Yurmash

== Salavatsky District ==
Rural localities in Salavatsky District:

- 1st Idelbaevo
- 2nd Idelbaevo
- Akhunovo
- Alkino
- Arkaulovo
- Ayskaya
- Bash-Ilchikeyevo
- Beshevlyarovo
- Bychkovka
- Chebarkul
- Cherepanovo
- Chulpan
- Gusevka
- Idrisovo
- Iltayevo
- Ishimbayevo
- Kalmaklarovo
- Karagulovo
- Komsomol
- Kuselyarovo
- Kyzyrbak
- Lagerevo
- Lakly
- Makhmutovo
- Maloyaz
- Mechetlino
- Meshchegarovo
- Mindishevo
- Mursalimkino
- Musatovo
- Nasibash
- Novaya Mikhaylovka
- Novosyuryukayevo
- Novyye Kartavly
- Pervomaysky
- Pokrovka
- Radio
- Russkoye Ilchikeyevo
- Sargamysh
- Sharipovo
- Sharyakovo
- Svoboda
- Tashaulovo
- Tatarsky Maloyaz
- Termenevo
- Turnaly
- Urdaly
- Urmanchino
- Urmantau
- Ustyatavka
- Yakhya
- Yangatau
- Yaubulyakovo
- Yazgi-Yurt
- Yelanysh
- Yelgildino
- Yulayevo
- Yunusovo

== Sharansky District ==
Rural localities in Sharansky District:

- Akbarisovo
- Almash
- Alpayevo
- Anisimova Polyana
- Bakhcha
- Barsukovo
- Bazgiyevo
- Bikkulovo
- Biktyshevo
- Borisovka
- Bulansaz
- Chalmaly
- Chekan-Tamak
- Chupayevo
- Dmitriyeva Polyana
- Dyurmenevo
- Dyurtyuli
- Grigoryevka
- Imchag
- Isametovo
- Istochnik
- Izimka
- Kagarchi-Bulyak
- Karakashly
- Karazybash
- Kir-Tlyavli
- Kubalyak
- Kurtutel
- Kyzyl-Chulpan
- Meshcherovo
- Michurinsk
- Mikhaylovka
- Naratasty
- Nizhnezaitovo
- Nizhniye Tashly
- Novaya Sbrodovka
- Novoalexandrovka
- Novobaygildino
- Novobaykiyevo
- Novochikeyevo
- Novoknyazevo
- Novopetrovka
- Novotavlarovo
- Novotroitsk
- Novotumbagushevo
- Novoturbeyevo
- Novoyumashevo
- Novoyuzeyevo
- Novy Kichkinyash
- Novy Tamyan
- Novye Karyavdy
- Nureyevo
- Papanovka
- Pisarevo
- Pokrovka
- Preobrazhenskoye
- Roshcha
- Rozhdestvenka
- Sakty
- Sarsaz
- Shaltykbashevo
- Sharan
- Sharanbash-Knyazevo
- Sharlykbash
- Sokolovka
- Starochikeyevo
- Starodrazhzhevo
- Starotumbagushevo
- Staroturbeyevo
- Stary Kichkinyash
- Stary Tamyan
- Starye Tlyavli
- Sunbash
- Sungurovka
- Tallykul
- Tan
- Taran
- Tash-Chishma
- Tat-Kuchuk
- Temyakovo
- Timirovo
- Tri Klyucha
- Tugaryak
- Ukiyaz
- Ulik-Yelga
- Ursayevo
- Uyalovo
- Vasilyevka
- Verkhniye Tashly
- Vladimirovka
- Yelan-Yelga
- Yelanchikbash
- Yemmetovo
- Yenakhmetovo
- Yeremkino
- Yangaulovo
- Yumadybash
- Yunost
- Zagornye Kletya
- Zirikly

== Sibay ==
Rural localities in Sibay urban okrug:

- Tuyalyas

== Sterlibashevsky District ==
Rural localities in Sterlibashevsky District:

- Akchishma
- Amirovo
- Artyukhovka
- Aydarali
- Aytugan
- Baimovo
- Bakeyevo
- Bakhcha
- Bankovka
- Borisovka
- Bulazh
- Bulyak
- Buzat
- Chegodayevka
- Dmitriyevka
- Galey-Buzat
- Gumbazy
- Ibrakayevo
- Ivanovka
- Kabakush
- Karagush
- Karamaly-Buzat
- Karanayevo
- Karayar
- Khalikeyevo
- Kordon Lesnoy
- Korneyevka
- Kuganakbash
- Kundryak
- Kyzyl-Yar
- Lugavushka
- Maly Buzat
- Maxyutovo
- Mukhametdaminovo
- Murtaza
- Mustafino
- Nikolskoye
- Nizhneibrayevo
- Nizhneshakarovo
- Nizhniye Karamaly
- Nizhny Allaguvat
- Novoivanovka
- Novonikolayevka
- Novy Kalkash
- Novy Mir
- Oktyabrevka
- Pervomaysky
- Pokrovka
- Rayevka
- Rodionovka
- Saraysino
- Sary-Yelga
- Sergeyevka
- Starolyubino
- Stary Kalkash
- Sterlibashevo
- Tabulda
- Turmayevo
- Tyater-Araslanovo
- Tyaterbash
- Uchugan-Asanovo
- Umetbatovo
- Verkhneshakarovo
- Verkhny Allaguvat
- Verkhny Gulyum
- Yangurcha
- Yasherganovo
- Yelimbetovo
- Yumaguzino

== Sterlitamaksky District ==
Rural localities in Sterlitamaksky District:

- Abdrakhmanovo
- Alatana
- Alga
- Asavo-Zubovo
- Ashkadar
- Aygulevo
- Ayuchevo
- Bayrak
- Begenyash
- Belskoye
- Beryozovka
- Bogolyubovka
- Bolshoy Kuganak
- Bolshoye Aksakovo
- Buguruslanovka
- Burikazganovo
- Cherkassy
- Chulpan
- Churtan
- Chuvashsky Kuganak
- Dergachevka
- Fedoro-Petrovka
- Grigoryevka
- Ishparsovo
- Kantyukovka
- Karmaskaly
- Kateninovsky
- Kazadayevka
- Khripunovsky
- Kononovsky
- Konstantino-Alexandrovka
- Konstantinogradovka
- Kosyakovka
- Krasnoarmeyskaya
- Kucherbayevo
- Kunakbayevo
- Kuzminovka
- Latypovka
- Lyubovka
- Mariinsky
- Markovsky
- Marshanovka
- Maryevka
- Matveyevka
- Maximovka
- Maxyutovo
- Mikhaylovka
- Mikryukovka
- Muravey
- Murdashevo
- Naumovka
- Nikolayevka
- Nikolayevka
- Nizhniye Usly
- Novaya Otradovka
- Novaya Vasilyevka
- Novoabdrakhmanovo
- Novoaleshkino
- Novofyodorovskoye
- Novomukatovka
- Novonikolayevka
- Novonikolayevsky
- Novoye Baryatino
- Novy Krasnoyar
- Oktyabrskoye
- Ozerkovka
- Pervomayskoye
- Petropavlovka
- Petrovka
- Podlesnoye
- Pokrovka
- Pokrovka
- Pokrovka-Ozerki
- Pomryaskino
- Preobrazhenovka
- Ranny Rassvet
- Roshchinsky
- Ryazanovka
- Rybkinsky
- Sadovka
- Saratovka
- Severnaya
- Shikhany
- Sokolovka
- Solovyovka
- Spasskoye
- Staroye Baryatino
- Sungur
- Talachevo
- Talalayevka
- Taneyevka
- Tyuryushlya
- Uslybash
- Ust-Zigan
- Vasilyevka
- Vedenovka
- Vedernikovsky
- Verkhniye Usly
- Vesyoly
- Vladimirovka
- Vostochny
- Yablunovka
- Yeslevsky
- Yuraktau
- Yuzhny
- Zabelskoye
- Zagorodny
- Zalivnoy
- Zolotonoshka

== Tatyshlinsky District ==
Rural localities in Tatyshlinsky District:

- 1st Yanaul
- 1st Zirimzibash
- 2nd Zirimzibash
- Achu-Yelga
- Aksaitovo
- Alga
- Aribash
- Aribashevo
- Artaulovo
- Asavdy
- Auk-Bulyak
- Badryashevo
- Bashkibash
- Baykibash
- Belyashevo
- Bigineyevo
- Biz
- Bul-Kaypanovo
- Burgynbash
- Chishma
- Churguldy
- Dubovka
- Fanga
- Garibashevo
- Ilmetovo
- Ivanovka
- Kaltyayevo
- Kardagushevo
- Karmanovo
- Kashkakovo
- Kustarevka
- Kytki-Yelga
- Malaya Balzuga
- Mamatayevo
- Managaz
- Maysk
- Nikolsk
- Nizhnebaltachevo
- Nizhneye Kaltyayevo
- Novochukurovo
- Novokaypanovo
- Novyye Irakty
- Novyye Tatyshly
- Petropavlovka
- Sarashtybash
- Savaleyevo
- Savkiyaz
- Shulganovo
- Staroakbulatovo
- Starochukurovo
- Starokalmiyarovo
- Starokaypanovo
- Starosoldovo
- Stary Kurdym
- Stary Kyzyl-Yar
- Stary Shardak
- Stary Sikiyaz
- Tanyp-Chishma
- Tanypovka
- Tashkent
- Urazgildy
- Utar-Yelga
- Uyadybash
- Verkhnebaltachevo
- Verkhnekudashevo
- Verkhniye Tatyshly
- Verkhnyaya Salayevka
- Vyazovka
- Yalgyz-Narat
- Yuda
- Yurmiyazbash
- Yusupovo
- Zilyaktau
- Zirimzi

== Tuymazinsky District ==
Rural localities in Tuymazinsky District:

- Ablaevo
- Adnagulovo
- Agirtamak
- Alexandrovka
- Alexeyevka
- Ardatovka
- Atyk
- Aytaktamak
- Bakhchisaray
- Balagach-Kul
- Baltayevo
- Bayrakatuba
- Bereskletovskogo Khozyaystva
- Bikmetovo
- Bishkurayevo
- Bulat
- Byatki
- Chapayevo
- Chukadybashevo
- Chukadytamak
- Chuvash-Ulkanovo
- Darvino
- Duslyk
- Frunze
- Gafurovo
- Gorny
- Ilchimbetovo
- Imangulovo
- Imyan-Kuper
- Ismailovo
- Kain-Yelga
- Kakrybashevo
- Kalshali
- Kamyshtau
- Kandry
- Kandry-Kutuy
- Kandry-Tyumekeyevo
- Kandrykul
- Karamaly-Gubeyevo
- Karan-Bishindy
- Karan-Yelga
- Karat-Tamak
- Karatovo
- Karmalka
- Kaznakovka
- Kendektamak
- Kiska-Yelga
- Konstantinovka
- Kozhay-Andreyevo
- Kuyutamak
- Kyzyl-Bulyak
- Kyzyl-Tash
- Leonidovka
- Lipovy Klyuch
- Maloye Bikmeyevo
- Maxyutovo
- Mayskoye
- Metevtamak
- Mulla-Kamysh
- Mustafino
- Nichka-Bulyak
- Nikitinka
- Nikolayevka
- Nizhnetroitsky
- Nizhniye Bishindy
- Nizhny Sardyk
- Nizhnyaya Karan-Yelga
- Novoarslanbekovo
- Novonaryshevo
- Novosukkulovo
- Novy Arslan
- Novyye Bishindy
- Nur
- Nurkeyevo
- Olkhovka
- Pervomayskoye
- Pokrovka
- Rayevka
- Raymanovo
- Samsykovo
- Sayranovo
- Serafimovka
- Serafimovsky
- Staroarslanbekovo
- Staroye Subkhankulovo
- Staryye Kandry
- Staryye Tuymazy
- Subkhankulovo
- Tash-Kichu
- Tatar-Ulkanovo
- Timirovo
- Tiryan-Yelga
- Tukayevo
- Tukmak-Karan
- Tuktagulovo
- Tyumenyak
- Tyupkildy
- Urmekeyevo
- Urnyak
- Uyazytamak
- Verkhnetroitskoye
- Verkhniye Bishindy
- Verkhny Sardyk
- Vozdvizhenka
- Yakshayevo
- Yaprykovo
- Yermukhametovo
- Yermunchino
- Zigityak

== Uchalinsky District ==
Rural localities in Uchalinsky District:

- Abdulkasimovo
- Absalyamovo
- Abzakovo
- Akhunovo
- Altyntash
- Amangildino
- Aslayevo
- Aznashevo
- Battalovo
- Bazargulovo
- Burangulovo
- Buyda
- Gadelshino
- Galiakhmerovo
- Ilchigulovo
- Ilchino
- Iltebanovo
- Ilyinka
- Imangulovo
- Ishkinovo
- Ishmekeyevo
- Istamgulovo
- Kaipkulovo
- Kalkanovo
- Kaluyevo
- Karaguzhino
- Karimovo
- Kazakkulovo
- Kazhayevo
- Kidysh
- Kiryabinskoye
- Komsomolsk
- Kubagushevo
- Kubyakovo
- Kuchukovo
- Kuchukovo-Mayak
- Kudashevo
- Kulushevo
- Kunakbayevo
- Kurama
- Kutuyevo
- Malokazakkulovo
- Malomuynakovo
- Mansurovo
- Mindyak
- Mishkino
- Moskovo
- Muldakayevo
- Muldashevo
- Musino
- Nauruzovo
- Novobayramgulovo
- Novokhusainovo
- Oktyabrsk
- Orlovka
- Ozerny
- Pervy May
- Polyakovka
- Rasulevo
- Rysayevo
- Safarovo
- Saytakovo
- Sharipovo
- Shartym
- Starobalbukovo
- Starobayramgulovo
- Staromuynakovo
- Suleymanovo
- Suramanovo
- Suyargulovo
- Suyundyukovo
- Tanychau
- Tashmuryn
- Tatlembetovo
- Tungatarovo
- Uchaly
- Ural
- Uralsk
- Urazovo
- Urgunovo
- Ustinovo
- Uzungulovo
- Voznesenka
- Yagudino
- Yalchigulovo
- Yuldashevo

== Ufa ==
Rural localities in Ufa urban okrug:

- Arkaul
- Atayevka
- Fyodorovka
- Iskino
- Ivanovsky
- Karpovo
- Knyazevo
- Korolyovo
- Lokotki
- Mokrousovo
- Nagayevo
- Nikolsky
- Novyye Cherkassy
- Polyana
- Posyolok Kamyshlinskogo melkombinata
- Posyolok Uchastka Nagayevskogo lesnichestva
- Samokhvalovka
- Staryye Turbasly
- Urshak
- Vetoshnikovo
- Votikeyevo
- Yelkibayevo
- Zhilino
- Zinino

== Ufimsky District ==
Rural localities in Ufimsky District:

- Alexeyevka
- Asanovo
- Avdon
- Beryozovka
- Beygulovo
- Bulgakovo
- Burtsevo
- Cherkassy
- Chernolesovsky
- Chernovsky
- Chesnokovka
- Chuvarez
- Debovka
- Derevnya Geofizikov
- Dmitriyevka
- Dorogino
- Dubki
- Dubrava
- Fomichevo
- Fyodorovka
- Glumilino
- Gornovo
- Gribovka
- Kamyshly
- Karmasan
- Karyugino
- Kazyrovo
- Kirillovo
- Kolokoltsevo
- Krasny Yar
- Kruchinino
- Kryuchevka
- Kumlekul
- Kundryak
- Lavochnoye
- Lebyazhy
- Lekarevka
- Lesnoy
- Marmylevo
- Mikhaylovka
- Milovka
- Mudarisovo
- Mysovtsevo
- Nachapkino
- Nikolayevka
- Nizhegorodka
- Novotroyevka
- Novyye Karashidy
- Nurlino
- Oktyabrsky
- Olkhovoye
- Opytnoye Khozyaystvo
- Osorgino
- Pervomaysky
- Peschany
- Podymalovo
- Pokrovka
- Rozhdestvensky
- Russky Yurmash
- Selo Yumatovskogo Selkhoztekhnikuma
- Selo sanatoriya Yumatovo imeni 15-letiya BASSR
- Selo stantsii Yumatovo
- Sergeyevka
- Shamonino
- Shemyak
- Shmidtovo
- Speransky
- Stukolkino
- Surovka
- Svetlaya
- Taptykovo
- Taush
- Torfyanoy
- Uptino
- Ushakovo
- Vavilovo
- Volkovo
- Volkovo
- Volno-Sukharevo
- Yagodnaya Polyana
- Yakshivanovo
- Yasny
- Yulushevo
- Yumatovo
- Yuzhnaya
- Zagorsky
- Zhukovo
- Zubovo

== Yanaulsky District ==
Rural localities in Yanaulsky District:

- Akhtiyal
- Akylbay
- Andreyevka
- Andreyevka
- Arlyan
- Asavdybash
- Atlegach
- Aybulyak
- Badryash
- Badryash-Aktau
- Banibash
- Barabanovka
- Bayguzino
- Baysarovo
- Budya Varyash
- Bulat-Yelga
- Changakul
- Cheraul
- Chetyrman
- Chulpan
- Gudburovo
- Igrovka
- Irdugan
- Isanbayevo
- Iskhak
- Istyak
- Itkineyevo
- Izhboldino
- Karman-Aktau
- Karmanovo (selo)
- Karmanovo (village)
- Kaymasha
- Kaymashbash
- Kichikir
- Kisak-Kain
- Konigovo
- Kostino
- Kumalak
- Kumovo
- Kush-Imyan
- Kyzyl-Yar
- Maximovo
- Mesyagutovo
- Mozhga
- Nanyady
- Nikolsk
- Nizhny Chat
- Nokrat
- Norkanovo
- Novaya Kirga
- Novaya Orya
- Novokudashevo
- Novotroitsk
- Novy Aldar
- Novy Artaul
- Novy Kuyuk
- Novy Susadybash
- Novy Varyash
- Orlovka
- Oshya-Tau
- Petrovka
- Progress
- Rabak
- Sabanchi
- Salikhovo
- Sandugach
- Shmelkovka
- Shudek
- Shudimari
- Sibady
- Staraya Orya
- Starokudashevo
- Stary Aldar
- Stary Artaul
- Stary Kuyuk
- Stary Susadybash
- Stary Varyash
- Sultyevo
- Susady-Ebalak
- Tartar
- Tash-Yelga
- Tatarskaya Urada
- Tau
- Turtyk
- Urakayevo
- Ural
- Varyash
- Varyashbash
- Verkhny Chat
- Verkhnyaya Barabanovka
- Votskaya Oshya
- Votskaya Urada
- Voyady
- Yamady
- Yambayevo
- Yamyady
- Yanbaris
- Yangus-Narat
- Yugamash
- Yussukovo
- Zaytsevo
- Zirka

== Yermekeyevsky District ==
Rural localities in Yermekeyevsky District:

- Abdulkarimovo
- Abdulovo
- Atamkul
- Axakovo
- Beketovo
- Bogorodsky
- Bolshezingereyevo
- Chulpan
- Gorodetskoye
- Ik
- Islambakhty
- Kalinovka
- Khoroshovka
- Knyazevka
- Kozhay-Maximovo
- Kulbayevo
- Kupcheneyevo
- Kushkaran
- Kyzyl-Yar
- Lyakhovo
- Mikhaylovka
- Nikitinka
- Nizhneulu-Yelga
- Nizhniye Karmaly
- Novonikolayevka
- Novoshakhovo
- Novoturayevo
- Novoyermekeyevo
- Novy
- Novyye Sulli
- Pionersky
- Raymanovo
- Ryatamak
- Selo imeni 8 Marta
- Semeno-Makarovo
- Spartak
- Sredniye Karmaly
- Staroshakhovo
- Staroturayevo
- Staryye Sulli
- Sukkulovo
- Suyermetovo
- Sysoyevka
- Taldy-Bulak
- Tarkazy
- Usman-Tashly
- Vasilyevka
- Verkhneulu-Yelga
- Yelan-Chishma
- Yermekeyevo
- Znamenka

== Zianchurinsky District ==
Rural localities in Zianchurinsky District:

- Abulyaisovo
- Abzanovo
- Agurda
- Akdavletovo
- Alibayevo
- Arsyonovo
- Ayutovo
- Baishevo
- Bashkirskaya Chumaza
- Bashkirskaya Urginka
- Bashkirsky Barmak
- Baydavletovo
- Bikbau
- Bikkuzha
- Bishtiryak
- Bogdanovka
- Buzhan
- Derevnya fermy 3 Sakmarskogo sovkhoza
- Gabbasovo
- Georgiyevsky
- Ibrayevo
- Idelbakovo
- Idyash
- Ilmalya
- Ishemgul
- Isyangulovo
- Itkulovo
- Ivanovka
- Kalimullino
- Kalininsky
- Karadygan
- Kargala
- Kazanka
- Khudabandino
- Kinzyabulatovo
- Kugarchi
- Kuzebekovo
- Kuzhanak
- Kyzylyarovo
- Luch
- Lukyanovsky
- Malinovka
- Maloye Baydavletovo
- Maly Muynak
- Mazitovo
- Mukhamedyanovo
- Nazarovo
- Niyazgulovo
- Nizhneye Mambetshino
- Nizhny Muynak
- Nizhny Sarabil
- Nizhnyaya Akberda
- Nizhnyaya Bikberda
- Novokasmartsky
- Novomikhaylovsky
- Novonikolayevka
- Novopavlovka
- Novopetrovskoye
- Novyye Chebenki
- Russkaya Urginka
- Sagitovo
- Sazala
- Seregulovo
- Sredny Muynak
- Suleymanovo
- Tazlarovo
- Tiryakle
- Trushino
- Umbetovo
- Utyagulovo
- Verkhneye Mambetshino
- Verkhny Muynak
- Verkhny Sarabil
- Verkhnyaya Bikberda
- Yangi-Yul
- Yanybayevo
- Yuldybayevo
- Yunayevo

== Zilairsky District ==
Rural localities in Zilairsky District:

- Annovka
- Aralbayevo
- Ashkadarovo
- Balapan
- Bayguzhino
- Berdyash Russky
- Berdyash
- Berezovka
- Bikyan
- Chuyunchi-Chupanovo
- Dmitriyevka
- Iskuzhino
- Ivano-Kuvalat
- Izhbuldy
- Kadyrsha
- Kamysh-Uzyak
- Kananikolskoye
- Kanzafarovo
- Kartlazma
- Kashkarovo
- Krasny Kushak
- Kyzlar-Birgan
- Maloyuldybayevo
- Matrayevo
- Maxyutovo
- Muchetbar
- Nadezhdinsky
- Nizhnegaleyevo
- Novoalexandrovka
- Novopokrovsky
- Novopreobrazhensky
- Novoyakupovo
- Petrovka
- Sabyrovo
- Salyakhovo
- Saratovsky
- Shansky
- Sidorovka
- Sosnovka
- Staroyakupovo
- Sultanmirovo
- Surtan-Uzyak
- Talikha
- Vasilyevka
- Verkhnegaleyevo
- Verkhnesalimovo
- Verkhnyaya Kazarma
- Vladimirovo-Nikolayevsky
- Voskresenskoye
- Voznesensky
- Yamansaz
- Yaparsaz
- Yuldybayevo
- Yumaguzhino
- Zilair

== See also ==
- Lists of rural localities in Russia
