= Korolyovo, Ufa, Republic of Bashkortostan =

Korolyovo Королёво
- Village
- Location within Bashkortostan Location within Russia
- Coordinates: 54°33′N 55°57′E
- Country: Russia
- Region: Bashkortostan
- District: Ufa
- Time zone: UTC+5:00

Korolyovo (Russian: Королёво) is a rural locality (a village) in Ufa, Bashkortostan, Russia. The population was 122 as of 2010. There is 1 street.

== Geography ==
Korolyovo is located 24 km south of Ufa. Atayevka is the nearest rural locality.
