= Novotroyevka, Ufimsky District, Republic of Bashkortostan =

Novotroyevka Новотроевка
- Village
- Location within Bashkortostan Location within Russia
- Coordinates: 54°43′N 55°25′E
- Country: Russia
- Region: Bashkortostan
- District: Ufimsky District
- Time zone: UTC+5:00

Novotroyevka (Russian: Новотроевка) is a rural locality (a village) in Shemyaksky Selsoviet, Ufimsky District, Bashkortostan, Russia. The population was 236 as of 2010. There are 2 streets.

== Geography ==
Novotroyevka is located 50 km west of Ufa (the district's administrative centre) by road. Krasny Oktyabr is the nearest rural locality.
