= Fomichevo, Republic of Bashkortostan =

Fomichevo Фомичево
- Village
- Location within Bashkortostan Location within Russia
- Coordinates: 54°30′N 55°48′E
- Country: Russia
- Region: Bashkortostan
- District: Ufimsky District
- Time zone: UTC+5:00

Fomichevo (Russian: Фомичево) is a rural locality (a village) in Bulgakovsky Selsoviet, Ufimsky District, Bashkortostan, Russia. The population was 234 as of 2010. There are 14 streets.

== Geography ==
Fomichevo is located 35 km southwest of Ufa (the district's administrative centre) by road. Yengalyshevo is the nearest rural locality.
