= Opytnoye Khozyaystvo =

Opytnoye Khozyaystvo Опытное Хозяйство
- Village
- Location within Bashkortostan Location within Russia
- Coordinates: 54°53′N 55°52′E
- Country: Russia
- Region: Bashkortostan
- District: Ufimsky District
- Time zone: UTC+5:00

Opytnoye Khozyaystvo (Russian: Опытное Хозяйство; Bashkir: Тәжрибә хужалығы, Täjribä xujalığı) is a rural locality (a village) in Krasnoyarsky Selsoviet, Ufimsky District, Bashkortostan, Russia. The population was 149 as of 2010. It comprises 6 streets.

== Geography ==
Opytnoye Khozyaystvo is located 26 km north of Ufa (the district's administrative centre) by road. Krasny Yar is the nearest rural locality.
