= Novopetrovskoye, Ivanovsky Selsoviet, Khaybullinsky District, Republic of Bashkortostan =

Novopetrovskoye Новопетровское
- Selo
- Location within Bashkortostan Location within Russia
- Coordinates: 51°56′N 57°50′E
- Country: Russia
- Region: Bashkortostan
- District: Khaybullinsky District
- Time zone: UTC+5:00

Novopetrovskoye (Russian: Новопетровское) is a rural locality (a selo) in Ivanovsky Selsoviet, Khaybullinsky District, Bashkortostan, Russia. The population was 44 as of 2010.
