= Karmanovo (village), Yanaulsky District, Republic of Bashkortostan =

Karmanovo Карманово
- Village
- Location within Bashkortostan Location within Russia
- Coordinates: 56°14′N 54°33′E
- Country: Russia
- Region: Bashkortostan
- District: Yanaulsky District
- Time zone: UTC+5:00

Karmanovo (Russian: Карманово; Bashkir: Ҡарман станцияһы, Qarman stantsiyahı) is a rural locality (a village) in Yanaulsky District, Bashkortostan, Russia. The population was 207 as of 2010. There are 3 streets.
