= Kumlekul =

Kumlekul Кумлекуль
- Selo
- Location within Bashkortostan Location within Russia
- Coordinates: 54°56′N 55°52′E
- Country: Russia
- Region: Bashkortostan
- District: Ufimsky District
- Time zone: UTC+5:00

Kumlekul (Russian: Кумлекуль; Bashkir: Ҡомлокүл, Qomlokül) is a rural locality (a selo) in Krasnoyarsky Selsoviet, Ufimsky District, Bashkortostan, Russia. The population was 748 as of 2010. There are 14 streets.

== Geography ==
Kumlekul is located 35 km north of Ufa (the district's administrative centre) by road. Yakshivanovo is the nearest rural locality.
