= Fyodorovka, Ufa, Republic of Bashkortostan =

Fyodorovka Фёдоровка
- Selo
- Location within Bashkortostan Location within Russia
- Coordinates: 54°41′N 56°08′E
- Country: Russia
- Region: Bashkortostan
- District: Ufa
- Time zone: UTC+5:00

Fyodorovka (Russian: Фёдоровка) is a rural locality (a selo) in Ufa, Bashkortostan, Russia. The population was 545 as of 2010.

== Geography ==
Fyodorovka is located 18 km southeast of Ufa. Samokhvalovka is the nearest rural locality.
