= Ilyinovka, Dedovsky Selsoviet, Fyodorovsky District, Republic of Bashkortostan =

Ilyinovka Ильиновка
- Village
- Location within Bashkortostan Location within Russia
- Coordinates: 53°05′N 55°05′E
- Country: Russia
- Region: Bashkortostan
- District: Fyodorovsky District
- Time zone: UTC+5:00

Ilyinovka (Russian: Ильиновка) is a rural locality (a village) in Dedovsky Selsoviet, Fyodorovsky District, Bashkortostan, Russia. The population was 15 as of 2010.

== Geography ==
It is located 10 km from Fyodorovka, 3 km from Dedovo.
