= Uptino =

Uptino Уптино
- Village
- Location within Bashkortostan Location within Russia
- Coordinates: 54°38′N 55°42′E
- Country: Russia
- Region: Bashkortostan
- District: Ufimsky District
- Time zone: UTC+5:00

Uptino (Russian: Уптино; Bashkir: Опто, Opto) is a rural locality (a village) in Yumatovsky Selsoviet, Ufimsky District, Bashkortostan, Russia. The population was 324 as of 2010. There are 15 streets.

== Geography ==
Uptino is located 29 km southwest of Ufa (the district's administrative centre) by road. Stantsii Yumatovo is the nearest rural locality.
