= Leninskoye, Kaltovsky Selsoviet, Iglinsky District, Republic of Bashkortostan =

Leninskoye Ленинское
- Village
- Location within Bashkortostan Location within Russia
- Coordinates: 54°39′N 56°32′E
- Country: Russia
- Region: Bashkortostan
- District: Iglinsky District
- Time zone: UTC+5:00

Leninskoye (Russian: Ленинское) is a rural locality (a village) in Kaltovsky Selsoviet, Iglinsky District, Bashkortostan, Russia. The population was 10 as of 2010.

== Geography ==
It is located 31 km from Iglino.
