= Torfyanoy =

Torfyanoy Торфяной
- Village
- Location within Bashkortostan Location within Russia
- Coordinates: 54°34′N 55°55′E
- Country: Russia
- Region: Bashkortostan
- District: Ufimsky District
- Time zone: UTC+5:00

Torfyanoy (Russian: Торфяной) is a rural locality (a village) in Chesnokovsky Selsoviet, Ufimsky District, Bashkortostan, Russia. The population was 196 as of 2010. There are 2 streets.

== Geography ==
Torfyanoy is located 19 km south of Ufa (the district's administrative centre) by road. Geofizikov is the nearest rural locality.
