= Alexandrovka, Sanninsky Selsoviet, Blagoveshchensky District, Bashkortostan =

Alexandrovka Александровка
- Village
- Location within Bashkortostan Location within Russia
- Coordinates: 55°16′N 56°04′E
- Country: Russia
- Region: Bashkortostan
- District: Blagoveshchensky District
- Time zone: UTC+5:00

Alexandrovka (Russian: Александровка) is a rural locality (a village) in Sanninsky Selsoviet, Blagoveshchensky District, Bashkortostan, Russia. The population was 40 as of 2010.

== Geography ==
It is located 39 km from Blagoveshchensk and 4 km from Sanninskoye.
