= Beygulovo =

Beygulovo Бейгулово
- Selo
- Location within Bashkortostan Location within Russia
- Coordinates: 54°43′N 55°29′E
- Country: Russia
- Region: Bashkortostan
- District: Ufimsky District
- Time zone: UTC+5:00

Beygulovo (Russian: Бейгулово; Bashkir: Бейғол, Beyğol) is a rural locality (a selo) in Shemyaksky Selsoviet, Ufimsky District, Bashkortostan, Russia. The population was 172 as of 2010. There is 1 street.

== Geography ==
Beygulovo is located 48 km west of Ufa (the district's administrative centre) by road. Oktyabrsky is the nearest rural locality.
