= Karpovo =

Karpovo Карпово
- Village
- Location within Bashkortostan Location within Russia
- Coordinates: 54°40′N 56°05′E
- Country: Russia
- Region: Bashkortostan
- District: Ufa
- Time zone: UTC+5:00

Karpovo (Russian: Карпово) is a rural locality (a village) in Ufa, Bashkortostan, Russia. The population was 135 as of 2010. There are 14 streets.
