= Shemyak =

Shemyak Шемяк
- Selo
- Location within Bashkortostan Location within Russia
- Coordinates: 54°47′N 55°29′E
- Country: Russia
- Region: Bashkortostan
- District: Ufimsky District
- Time zone: UTC+5:00

Shemyak (Russian: Шемяк; Bashkir: Шемәк, Şemäk) is a rural locality (a selo) in Shemyaksky Selsoviet, Ufimsky District, Bashkortostan, Russia. The population was 428 as of 2010. There are 10 streets.

== Geography ==
Shemyak is located 40 km west of Ufa (the district's administrative centre) by road. Oktyabrsky is the nearest rural locality.
