= Shamonino =

Shamonino Шамонино
- Village
- Location within Bashkortostan Location within Russia
- Coordinates: 54°39′N 56°12′E
- Country: Russia
- Region: Bashkortostan
- District: Ufimsky District
- Time zone: UTC+5:00

Shamonino (Russian: Шамонино) is a rural locality (a village) in Russko-Yurmashsky Selsoviet, Ufimsky District, Bashkortostan, Russia. The population was 258 as of 2010. There are 22 streets.

== Geography ==
Shamonino is located 24 km southeast of Ufa (the district's administrative centre) by road. Yuzhnaya is the nearest rural locality.
