= Novomusino, Kabakovsky Selsoviet, Karmaskalinsky District, Republic of Bashkortostan =

Novomusino Новомусино
- Village
- Location within Bashkortostan Location within Russia
- Coordinates: 54°28′N 56°01′E
- Country: Russia
- Region: Bashkortostan
- District: Karmaskalinsky District
- Time zone: UTC+5:00

Novomusino (Russian: Новомусино; Bashkir: Яңы Муса, Yañı Musa) is a rural locality (a village) in Karmaskalinsky District, Bashkortostan, Russia. The population was four as of 2010.
