= Yelkibayevo =

Yelkibayevo Елкибаево
- Village
- Location within Bashkortostan Location within Russia
- Coordinates: 54°42′N 56°06′E
- Country: Russia
- Region: Bashkortostan
- District: Ufa
- Time zone: UTC+5:00

Yelkibayevo (Russian: Елкибаево; Bashkir: Йылҡыбай, Yılqıbay) is a rural locality (a village) in Ufa, Bashkortostan, Russia. The population was 61 as of 2010. There are 3 streets.

== Geography ==
Yelkibayevo is located 21 km southeast of Ufa. Fyodorovka is the nearest rural locality.
