= Lokotki =

Lokotki Локотки
- Village
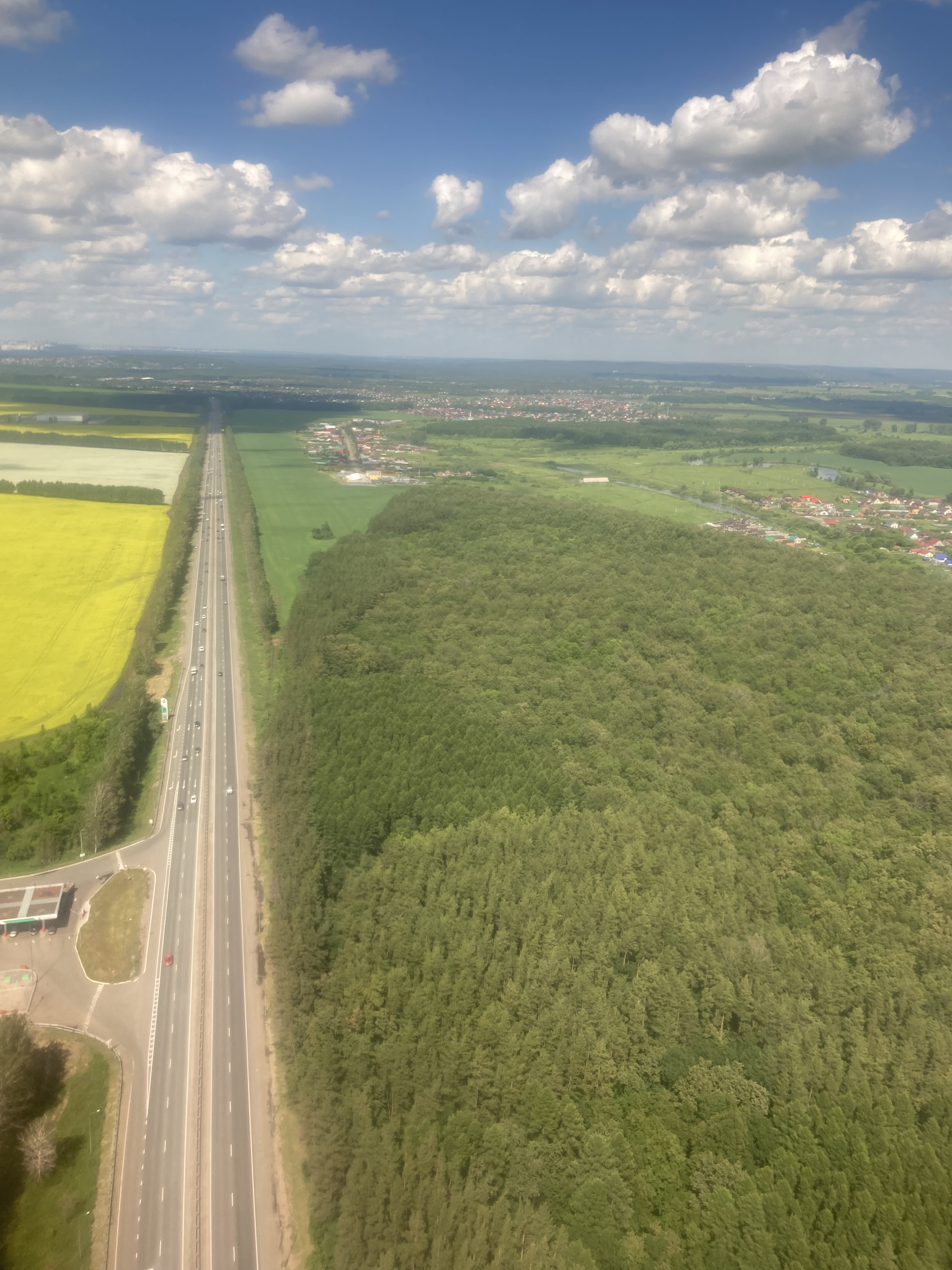
- R240 Federal Highway and Lokotki settlement at right from a passenger plane

- Location within Bashkortostan Location within Russia
- Coordinates: 54°32′N 55°54′E
- Country: Russia
- Region: Bashkortostan
- District: Ufa
- Time zone: UTC+5:00

Lokotki (Russian: Локотки) is a rural locality (a village) in Ufa, Bashkortostan, Russia. The population was 153 as of 2010. There is 1 street.

== Geography ==
Lokotki is located 24 km south of Ufa. Atayevka is the nearest rural locality.
