= Kazyrovo =

Kazyrovo Казырово
- Selo
- Location within Bashkortostan Location within Russia
- Coordinates: 54°47′39″N 55°40′32″E
- Country: Russia
- Region: Bashkortostan
- District: Ufimsky District
- Time zone: UTC+5:00

Kazyrovo (Russian: Казырово; Bashkir: Ҡаҙыр, Qaźır) is a rural locality (a selo) in Nikolayevsky Selsoviet, Ufimsky District, Bashkortostan, Russia. The population was 105 as of 2010. There are 7 streets.

== Geography ==
Kazyrovo is located 30 km northwest of Ufa (the district's administrative centre) by road. Kruchinino is the nearest rural locality.
