= Novyye Karashidy =

Novyye Karashidy Новые Карашиды
- Village
- Location within Bashkortostan Location within Russia
- Coordinates: 54°52′N 56°18′E
- Country: Russia
- Region: Bashkortostan
- District: Ufimsky District
- Time zone: UTC+5:00

Novyye Karashidy (Russian: Новые Карашиды; Bashkir: Яңы Ҡарашиҙе, Yañı Qaraşiźe) is a rural locality (a village) in Cherkassky Selsoviet, Ufimsky District, Bashkortostan, Russia. The population was 97 as of 2010. There are 9 streets.

== Geography ==
Novyye Karashidy is located 36 km northeast of Ufa (the district's administrative centre) by road. Volkovo is the nearest rural locality.
