= Krym-Sarayevo =

Krym-Sarayevo Крым-Сараево
- Selo
- Location within Bashkortostan Location within Russia
- Coordinates: 56°02′N 54°19′E
- Country: Russia
- Region: Bashkortostan
- District: Neftekamsk
- Time zone: UTC+5:00

Krym-Sarayevo (Russian: Крым-Сараево; Bashkir: Ҡырым-Һарай, Qırım-Haray) is a rural locality (a selo) in Neftekamsk, Bashkortostan, Russia. The population was 273 as of 2010. There are 7 streets.

== Geography ==
Krym-Sarayevo is located 10 km southeast of Neftekamsk. Tashkinovo is the nearest rural locality.
