= Stepanovka, Kosh-Yelginsky Selsoviet, Bizhbulyaksky District, Republic of Bashkortostan =

Stepanovka Степановка
- Village
- Location within Bashkortostan Location within Russia
- Coordinates: 53°57′N 54°22′E
- Country: Russia
- Region: Bashkortostan
- District: Bizhbulyaksky District
- Time zone: UTC+5:00

Stepanovka (Russian: Степановка) is a rural locality (a village) in Kosh-Yelginsky Selsoviet, Bizhbulyaksky District, Bashkortostan, Russia. The population was 35 as of 2010.
