= Stukolkino =

Stukolkino Стуколкино
- Village
- Location within Bashkortostan Location within Russia
- Coordinates: 54°31′N 55°52′E
- Country: Russia
- Region: Bashkortostan
- District: Ufimsky District
- Time zone: UTC+5:00

Stukolkino (Russian: Стуколкино) is a rural locality (a village) in Bulgakovsky Selsoviet, Ufimsky District, Bashkortostan, Russia. The population was 441 as of 2010. There are 15 streets.

== Geography ==
Stukolkino is located 32 km south of Ufa (the district's administrative centre) by road. Iskino is the nearest rural locality.
