= Novopetrovskoye, Ufimsky Selsoviet, Khaybullinsky District, Republic of Bashkortostan =

Novopetrovskoye Новопетровское
- Selo
- Location within Bashkortostan Location within Russia
- Coordinates: 52°09′N 58°13′E
- Country: Russia
- Region: Bashkortostan
- District: Khaybullinsky District
- Time zone: UTC+5:00

Novopetrovskoye (Russian: Новопетровское) is a rural locality (a selo) in Ufimsky Selsoviet, Khaybullinsky District, Bashkortostan, Russia. The population was 302 as of 2010.

== Geography ==
It is located 34 km from Akyar.
