= Nachapkino =

Nachapkino Начапкино
- Village
- Location within Bashkortostan Location within Russia
- Coordinates: 54°45′N 55°44′E
- Country: Russia
- Region: Bashkortostan
- District: Ufimsky District
- Time zone: UTC+5:00

Nachapkino (Russian: Начапкино) is a rural locality (a village) in Milovsky Selsoviet, Ufimsky District, Bashkortostan, Russia. The population was 28 as of 2010. There are 5 streets.

== Geography ==
Nachapkino is located 27 km west of Ufa (the district's administrative centre) by road. Vetoshnikovo is the nearest rural locality.
