= Karyugino =

Karyugino Карюгино
- Village
- Location within Bashkortostan Location within Russia
- Coordinates: 54°52′N 55°56′E
- Country: Russia
- Region: Bashkortostan
- District: Ufimsky District
- Time zone: UTC+5:00

Karyugino (Russian: Карюгино) is a rural locality (a village) in Krasnoyarsky Selsoviet, Ufimsky District, Bashkortostan, Russia. The population was 16 as of 2010. There are 3 streets.

== Geography ==
Karyugino is located 31 km north of Ufa (the district's administrative centre) by road. Krasny Yar is the nearest rural locality.
