= Votikeyevo =

Votikeyevo Вотикеево
- Selo
- Location within Bashkortostan Location within Russia
- Coordinates: 54°52′N 56°13′E
- Country: Russia
- Region: Bashkortostan
- District: Ufa
- Time zone: UTC+5:00

Votikeyevo (Russian: Вотикеево) is a rural locality (a selo) in Ufa, Bashkortostan, Russia. The population was 286 as of 2010. There are 4 streets.

== Geography ==
Votikeyevo is located 32 km northeast of Ufa. Cherkassy is the nearest rural locality.
