= Surovka =

Surovka Суровка
- Village
- Location within Bashkortostan Location within Russia
- Coordinates: 54°49′N 55°54′E
- Country: Russia
- Region: Bashkortostan
- District: Ufimsky District
- Time zone: UTC+5:00

Surovka (Russian: Суровка) is a rural locality (a village) in Mikhaylovsky Selsoviet, Ufimsky District, Bashkortostan, Russia. The population was 421 as of 2010. There are 24 streets.

== Geography ==
Surovka is located 19 km north of Ufa (the district's administrative centre) by road. Mikhaylovka is the nearest rural locality.
