= Arkaul, Ufa, Republic of Bashkortostan =

Arkaul Аркаул
- Village
- Location within Bashkortostan Location within Russia
- Coordinates: 54°55′N 56°06′E
- Country: Russia
- Region: Bashkortostan
- District: Ufa
- Time zone: UTC+5:00

Arkaul (Russian: Аркаул; Bashkir: Арҡауыл, Arqawıl) is a rural locality (a village) in Ufa, Bashkortostan, Russia. The population was 85 as of 2010. There is 1 street.

== Geography ==
Arkaul is located 33 km northeast of Ufa. Starye Turbasly is the nearest rural locality.
