= Iskino =

Iskino Искино
- Village
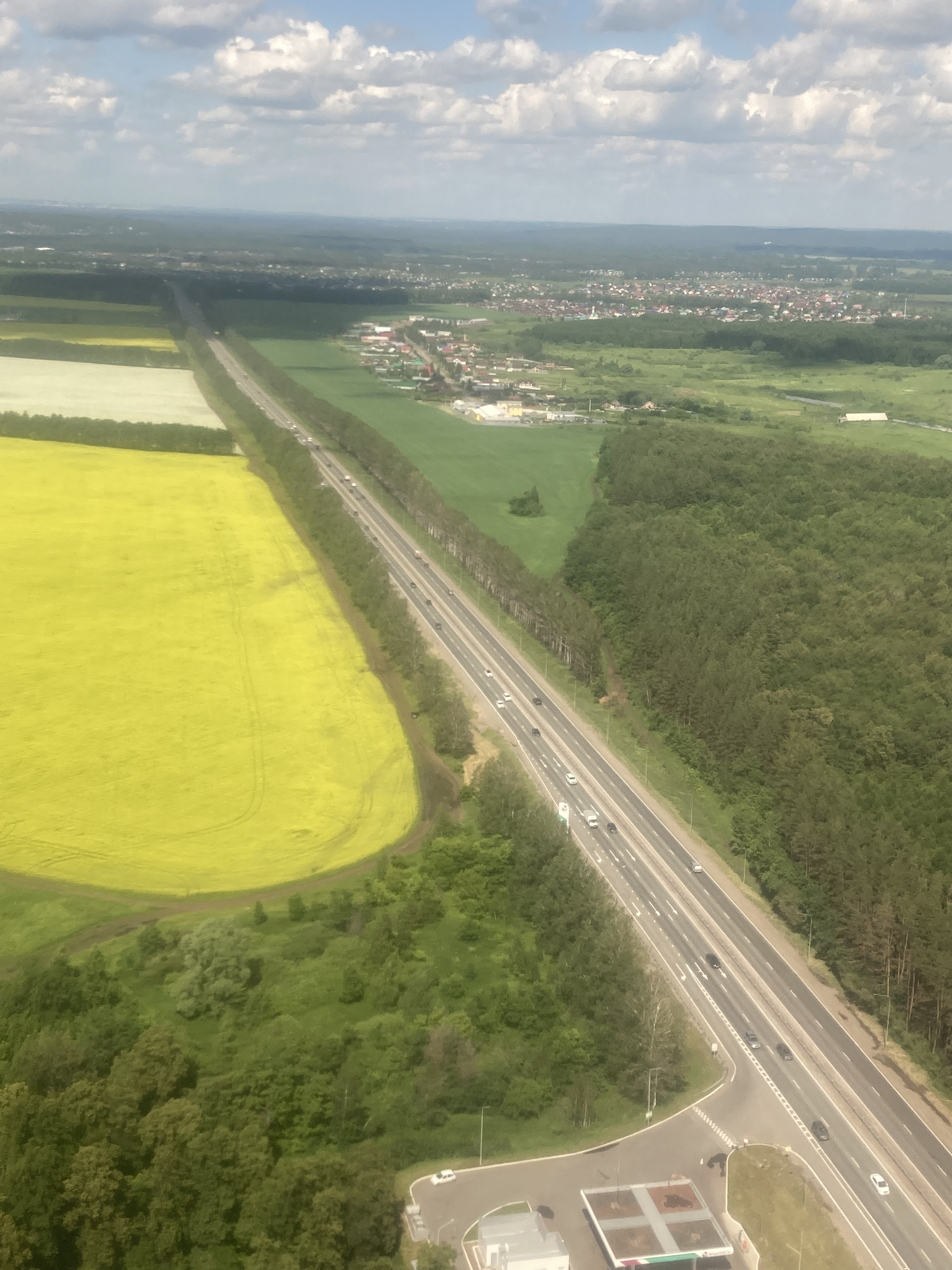
- R240 Federal Highway (Russia) and Iskino (in right) from a passenger plane

- Location within Bashkortostan Location within Russia
- Coordinates: 54°31′N 55°54′E
- Country: Russia
- Region: Bashkortostan
- District: Ufa
- Time zone: UTC+5:00

Iskino (Russian: Искино; Bashkir: Искин, İskin) is a rural locality (a village) in Ufa, Bashkortostan, Russia. The population was 567 as of 2010. There are 13 streets.

== Geography ==
Iskino is located 26 km south of Ufa. Polyana is the nearest rural locality.
