= Taush, Ufimsky District, Republic of Bashkortostan =

Taush Тауш
- Village
- Location within Bashkortostan Location within Russia
- Coordinates: 54°47′N 56°18′E
- Country: Russia
- Region: Bashkortostan
- District: Ufimsky District
- Time zone: UTC+5:00

Taush (Russian: Тауш; Bashkir: Тыуыш, Tıwış) is a rural locality (a village) in Kirillovsky Selsoviet, Ufimsky District, Bashkortostan, Russia. The population was 55 as of 2010. It has 1 street.

== Geography ==
Taush is located 30 km northeast of Ufa (the district's administrative centre) by road. Gribovka is the nearest rural locality.
