= Yagodnaya Polyana =

Yagodnaya Polyana Ягодная Поляна
- Village
- Location within Bashkortostan Location within Russia
- Coordinates: 54°47′N 55°45′E
- Country: Russia
- Region: Bashkortostan
- District: Ufimsky District
- Time zone: UTC+5:00

Yagodnaya Polyana (Russian: Ягодная Поляна) is a rural locality (a village) in Dmitriyevsky Selsoviet, Ufimsky District, Bashkortostan, Russia. The population was 417 as of 2010. There are 6 streets.

== Geography ==
Yagodnaya Polyana is located 22 km northwest of Ufa (the district's administrative centre) by road. Ushakovo is the nearest rural locality.
