= Urshak, Ufa, Republic of Bashkortostan =

Urshak Уршак
- Settlement
- Location within Bashkortostan Location within Russia
- Coordinates: 54°33′N 55°55′E
- Country: Russia
- Region: Bashkortostan
- District: Ufa
- Time zone: UTC+5:00

Urshak (Russian: Уршак) is a rural locality (a settlement) in Ufa, Bashkortostan, Russia. The population was 57 as of 2010.

== Geography ==
Urshak is located 21 km south of Ufa. Mokrousovo is the nearest rural locality.
