= Glumilino =

Glumilino Глумилино
- Village
- Location within Bashkortostan Location within Russia
- Coordinates: 54°36′N 55°44′E
- Country: Russia
- Region: Bashkortostan
- District: Ufimsky District
- Time zone: UTC+5:00

Glumilino (Russian: Глумилино) is a rural locality (a village) in Taptykovsky Selsoviet, Ufimsky District, Bashkortostan, Russia. The population was 64 as of 2010. There are 7 streets.

== Geography ==
Glumilino is located 32 km southwest of Ufa (the district's administrative centre) by road. Lekarevka is the nearest rural locality.
