= Nagayevo, Ufa, Republic of Bashkortostan =

Nagayevo Нагаево
- Selo
- Location within Bashkortostan Location within Russia
- Coordinates: 54°37′N 56°06′E
- Country: Russia
- Region: Bashkortostan
- District: Ufa
- Time zone: UTC+5:00

Nagayevo (Russian: Нагаево; Bashkir: Ноғай, Nuğay) is a rural locality (a selo) in Ufa, Bashkortostan, Russia. The population was 1,479 as of 2010. There are 166 streets.

== Geography ==
Nagayevo is located 18 km southeast of Ufa. Zinino is the nearest rural locality.
