= Lavochnoye =

Lavochnoye Лавочное
- Selo
- Location within Bashkortostan Location within Russia
- Coordinates: 54°53′N 56°00′E
- Country: Russia
- Region: Bashkortostan
- District: Ufimsky District
- Time zone: UTC+5:00

Lavochnoye (Russian: Лавочное) is a rural locality (a selo) in Krasnoyarsky Selsoviet, Ufimsky District, Bashkortostan, Russia. The population was 2 as of 2010. There is 1 street.

== Geography ==
Lavochnoye is located 20 km north of Ufa (the district's administrative centre) by road. Tarbeyevka is the nearest rural locality.
