= Marmylevo =

Marmylevo Мармылево
- Village
- Location within Bashkortostan Location within Russia
- Coordinates: 54°44′N 55°47′E
- Country: Russia
- Region: Bashkortostan
- District: Ufimsky District
- Time zone: UTC+5:00

Marmylevo (Russian: Мармылево) is a rural locality (a village) in Zhukovsky Selsoviet, Ufimsky District, Bashkortostan, Russia. The population was 232 as of 2010. There are 6 streets.

== Geography ==
Marmylevo is located 22 km west of Ufa (the district's administrative centre) by road. Romanovka is the nearest rural locality.
