= Staryye Turbasly =

Staryye Turbasly Старые Турбаслы Иҫке Турбаҫлы
- Selo
- Location within Bashkortostan Location within Russia
- Coordinates: 54°56′N 56°07′E
- Country: Russia
- Region: Bashkortostan
- District: Ufa
- Time zone: UTC+5:00

Staryye Turbasly (Russian: Старые Турбаслы; Bashkir: Иҫке Турбаҫлы, İśke Turbaślı) is a rural locality (a selo) in Ufa, Bashkortostan, Russia. The population was 1,395 as of 2010. There are 20 streets.

== Geography ==
Staryye Turbasly is located 31 km northeast of Ufa. Arkhangelsky is the nearest rural locality.
