= Ilyinovka, Pokrovsky Selsoviet, Fyodorovsky District, Republic of Bashkortostan =

Ilyinovka Ильиновка
- Village
- Location within Bashkortostan Location within Russia
- Coordinates: 53°13′N 54°56′E
- Country: Russia
- Region: Bashkortostan
- District: Fyodorovsky District
- Time zone: UTC+5:00

Ilyinovka (Russian: Ильиновка) is a rural locality (a village) in Pokrovsky Selsoviet, Fyodorovsky District, Bashkortostan, Russia. The population was 32 as of 2010.

== Geography ==
Ilyinovka is located 21 km from Fyodorovka, 1 km from Pokrovka.
