= Posyolok Kamyshlinskogo melkombinata =

Posyolok Kamyshlinskogo melkombinata Посёлок Камышлинского мелькомбината
- Settlement
- Location within Bashkortostan Location within Russia
- Coordinates: 54°31′N 55°56′E
- Country: Russia
- Region: Bashkortostan
- District: Ufa
- Time zone: UTC+5:00

Posyolok Kamyshlinskogo melkombinata (Russian: Посёлок Камышлинского мелькомбината) is a rural locality (a settlement) in Ufa, Bashkortostan, Russia. The population was 44 as of 2010. There is 1 street.

== Geography ==
The settlement is located 25 km south of Ufa. Kamyshly is the nearest rural locality.
