= Tavrichanka, Davlekanovsky District, Republic of Bashkortostan =

Tavrichanka Тавричанка
- Village
- Location within Bashkortostan Location within Russia
- Coordinates: 54°11′N 54°52′E
- Country: Russia
- Region: Bashkortostan
- District: Davlekanovsky District
- Time zone: UTC+5:00

Tavrichanka (Russian: Тавричанка) is a rural locality (a village) in Sergiopolsky Selsoviet, Davlekanovsky District, Bashkortostan, Russia. The population was 2 as of 2010. There is 1 streets.

== Geography ==
It is located 12 km from Davlekanovo and 5 km from Sergiopol.
