= Atayevka =

Atayevka Атаевка
- Village
- Location within Bashkortostan Location within Russia
- Coordinates: 54°32′N 55°56′E
- Country: Russia
- Region: Bashkortostan
- District: Ufa
- Time zone: UTC+5:00

Atayevka (Bashkir and Russian: Атаевка) is a rural locality (a village) in Ufa, Bashkortostan, Russia. The population was 101 as of 2010. There are 8 streets.

== Geography ==
Atayevka is located 24 km south of Ufa. Korolyovo is the nearest rural locality.
