= Stepanovka, Mikhaylovsky Selsoviet, Bizhbulyaksky District, Republic of Bashkortostan =

Stepanovka Степановка
- Village
- Location within Bashkortostan Location within Russia
- Coordinates: 53°49′N 54°00′E
- Country: Russia
- Region: Bashkortostan
- District: Bizhbulyaksky District
- Time zone: UTC+5:00

Stepanovka (Russian: Степановка) is a rural locality (a village) in Mikhaylovsky Selsoviet, Bizhbulyaksky District, Bashkortostan, Russia. The population was 6 as of 2010.

== Geography ==
It is located 55 km from Bizhbulyak and 15 km from Mikhaylovka.
