= Osorgino, Ufimsky District, Republic of Bashkortostan =

Osorgino Осоргино
- Village
- Location within Bashkortostan Location within Russia
- Coordinates: 54°32′N 55°45′E
- Country: Russia
- Region: Bashkortostan
- District: Ufimsky District
- Time zone: UTC+5:00

Osorgino (Russian: Осоргино) is a rural locality (a village) in Taptykovsky Selsoviet, Ufimsky District, Bashkortostan, Russia. The population was 238 as of 2010. There are 20 streets.

== Geography ==
Osorgino is located 31 km southwest of Ufa (the district's administrative centre) by road. Yengalyshevo is the nearest rural locality.
