= Novyye Cherkassy =

Novyye Cherkassy Новые Черкассы
- Settlement
- Location within Bashkortostan Location within Russia
- Coordinates: 54°54′N 56°08′E
- Country: Russia
- Region: Bashkortostan
- District: Ufa
- Time zone: UTC+5:00

Novyye Cherkassy (Russian: Новые Черкассы; Bashkir: Яңы Черкассы, Yañı Çerkassı) is a rural locality (a settlement) in Ufa, Bashkortostan, Russia. The population was 1,944 as of 2010. There are 5 streets.

== Geography ==
Novyye Cherkassy is located 26 km northeast of Ufa. Ivanovsky is the nearest rural locality.
