= Kolokoltsevo =

Kolokoltsevo Колокольцево
- Village
- Location within Bashkortostan Location within Russia
- Coordinates: 54°45′N 55°39′E
- Country: Russia
- Region: Bashkortostan
- District: Ufimsky District
- Time zone: UTC+5:00

Kolokoltsevo (Russian: Колокольцево) is a rural locality (a village) in Nikolayevsky Selsoviet, Ufimsky District, Bashkortostan, Russia. The population was 22 as of 2010. There is 1 street.

== Geography ==
Kolokoltsevo is located 34 km west of Ufa (the district's administrative centre) by road. Kruchinino is the nearest rural locality.
