= Nizhegorodka =

Nizhegorodka Нижегородка
- Selo
- Location within Bashkortostan Location within Russia
- Coordinates: 54°36′N 55°50′E
- Country: Russia
- Region: Bashkortostan
- District: Ufimsky District
- Time zone: UTC+5:00

Nizhegorodka (Russian: Нижегородка) is a rural locality (a selo) in Zubovsky Selsoviet, Ufimsky District, Bashkortostan, Russia. The population was 2,541 as of 2010. There are 17 streets.

== Geography ==
Nizhegorodka is located 20 km southwest of Ufa (the district's administrative centre) by road. Zubovo is the nearest rural locality.
