= Sredniye Karamaly =

Sredniye Karamaly Средние Карамалы
- Selo
- Location within Bashkortostan Location within Russia
- Coordinates: 53°58′N 53°35′E
- Country: Russia
- Region: Bashkortostan
- District: Yermekeyevsky District
- Time zone: UTC+5:00

Sredniye Karamaly (Russian: Средние Карамалы; Bashkir: Урта Ҡарамалы, Urta Qaramalı) is a rural locality (a selo) and the administrative centre of Srednekarmalinsky Selsoviet, Yermekeyevsky District, Bashkortostan, Russia. The population was 403 as of 2010. There are 4 streets.

== Geography ==
Sredniye Karamaly is located 14 km southwest of Yermekeyevo. Nizhniye Karamaly is the nearest rural locality.
