= Alexandrovka, Bedeyevo-Polyansky Selsoviet, Blagoveshchensky District, Bashkortostan =

Alexandrovka Александровка
- Village
- Location within Bashkortostan Location within Russia
- Coordinates: 55°17′N 56°25′E
- Country: Russia
- Region: Bashkortostan
- District: Blagoveshchensky District
- Time zone: UTC+5:00

Alexandrovka (Russian: Александровка) is a rural locality (a village) in Bedeyevo-Polyansky Selsoviet, Blagoveshchensky District, Bashkortostan, Russia. The population was 171 as of 2010.

== Geography ==
It is located 52 km from Blagoveshchensk and 5 km from Bedeyeva Polyana.
