= Nikolsky, Ufa, Republic of Bashkortostan =

Nikolsky Никольский
- Settlement
- Location within Bashkortostan Location within Russia
- Coordinates: 54°54′N 56°06′E
- Country: Russia
- Region: Bashkortostan
- District: Ufa
- Time zone: UTC+5:00

Nikolsky (Russian: Никольский) is a rural locality (a settlement) in Ufa, Bashkortostan, Russia. The population was 198 as of 2010. There is 1 street.

== Geography ==
Nikolsky is located 253 km southeast of Ufa.
