= Posyolok Uchastka Nagayevskogo lesnichestva =

Posyolok Uchastka Nagayevskogo lesnichestva Посёлок Участка Нагаевского лесничества
- Settlement
- Location within Bashkortostan Location within Russia
- Coordinates: 54°37′N 56°02′E
- Country: Russia
- Region: Bashkortostan
- District: Ufa
- Time zone: UTC+5:00

Posyolok Uchastka Nagayevskogo lesnichestva (Russian: Посёлок Участка Нагаевского лесничества) is a rural locality (a settlement) in Ufa, Bashkortostan, Russia. The population was 15 as of 2010.

== Geography ==
The settlement is located 19 km southeast of Ufa. Zinino is the nearest rural locality.
