= Pervomaysky, Ufimsky District, Republic of Bashkortostan =

Pervomaysky Первомайский
- Village
- Location within Bashkortostan Location within Russia
- Coordinates: 54°46′N 55°26′E
- Country: Russia
- Region: Bashkortostan
- District: Ufimsky District
- Time zone: UTC+5:00

Pervomaysky (Russian: Первомайский) is a rural locality (a village) in Shemyaksky Selsoviet, Ufimsky District, Bashkortostan, Russia. The population was 307 as of 2010. There are 4 streets.

== Geography ==
Pervomaysky is located 46 km west of Ufa (the district's administrative centre) by road. Oktyabrsky is the nearest rural locality.
