= Yakshivanovo =

Yakshivanovo Якшиваново
- Village
- Location within Bashkortostan Location within Russia
- Coordinates: 54°56′N 55°54′E
- Country: Russia
- Region: Bashkortostan
- District: Ufimsky District
- Time zone: UTC+5:00

Yakshivanovo (Russian: Якшиваново; Bashkir: Яҡшиван, Yaqşiwan) is a rural locality (a village) in Krasnoyarsky Selsoviet, Ufimsky District, Bashkortostan, Russia. The population was 32 as of 2010. There is 1 street.

== Geography ==
Yakshivanovo is located 33 km north of Ufa (the district's administrative centre) by road. Kumlekul is the nearest rural locality.
