= Speransky, Ufimsky District, Republic of Bashkortostan =

Speransky Сперанский
- Village
- Location within Bashkortostan Location within Russia
- Coordinates: 54°45′N 55°39′E
- Country: Russia
- Region: Bashkortostan
- District: Ufimsky District
- Time zone: UTC+5:00

Speransky (Russian: Сперанский) is a rural locality (a village) in Nikolayevsky Selsoviet, Ufimsky District, Bashkortostan, Russia. The population was 9 as of 2010. There is 1 street.

== Geography ==
Speransky is located 34 km west of Ufa (the district's administrative centre) by road. Kolokoltsevo is the nearest rural locality.
