= Yuzhnaya, Ufimsky District, Republic of Bashkortostan =

Yuzhnaya Южная
- Village
- Location within Bashkortostan Location within Russia
- Coordinates: 54°38′N 56°12′E
- Country: Russia
- Region: Bashkortostan
- District: Ufimsky District
- Time zone: UTC+5:00

Yuzhnaya (Russian: Южная) is a rural locality (a village) in Russko-Yurmashsky Selsoviet, Ufimsky District, Bashkortostan, Russia. The population was 7 as of 2010. There is 1 street.

== Geography ==
Yuzhnaya is located 25 km southeast of Ufa (the district's administrative centre) by road. Shmidtovo is the nearest rural locality.
