= Semerikovka =

Semerikovka Семериковка
- Village
- Location within Bashkortostan Location within Russia
- Coordinates: 55°28′N 58°14′E
- Country: Russia
- Region: Bashkortostan
- District: Duvansky District
- Time zone: UTC+5:00

Semerikovka (Russian: Семериковка) is a rural locality (a village) in Sikiyazsky Selsoviet, Duvansky District, Bashkortostan, Russia. The population was 88 as of 2010. There are 2 streets.

== Population ==
- 2002: 96
- 2010: 88

== Location ==
Semerikovka is located on the left bank of the Ai river. It is located 7 km from Mesyagutovo, 68 km from Sikiyaz, and 82 km from Suleia.
