= Zinino =

Zinino Зинино
- Settlement
- Location within Bashkortostan Location within Russia
- Coordinates: 54°38′N 56°04′E
- Country: Russia
- Region: Bashkortostan
- District: Ufa
- Time zone: UTC+5:00

Zinino (Bashkir and Russian: Зинино) is a rural locality (a settlement) in Ufa, Bashkortostan, Russia. The population was 369 as of 2010. There are 16 streets.

== Geography ==
Zinino is located 17 km southeast of Ufa. Nagayevo is the nearest rural locality.
