= Starobashirovo =

Starobashirovo Старобаширово
- Selo
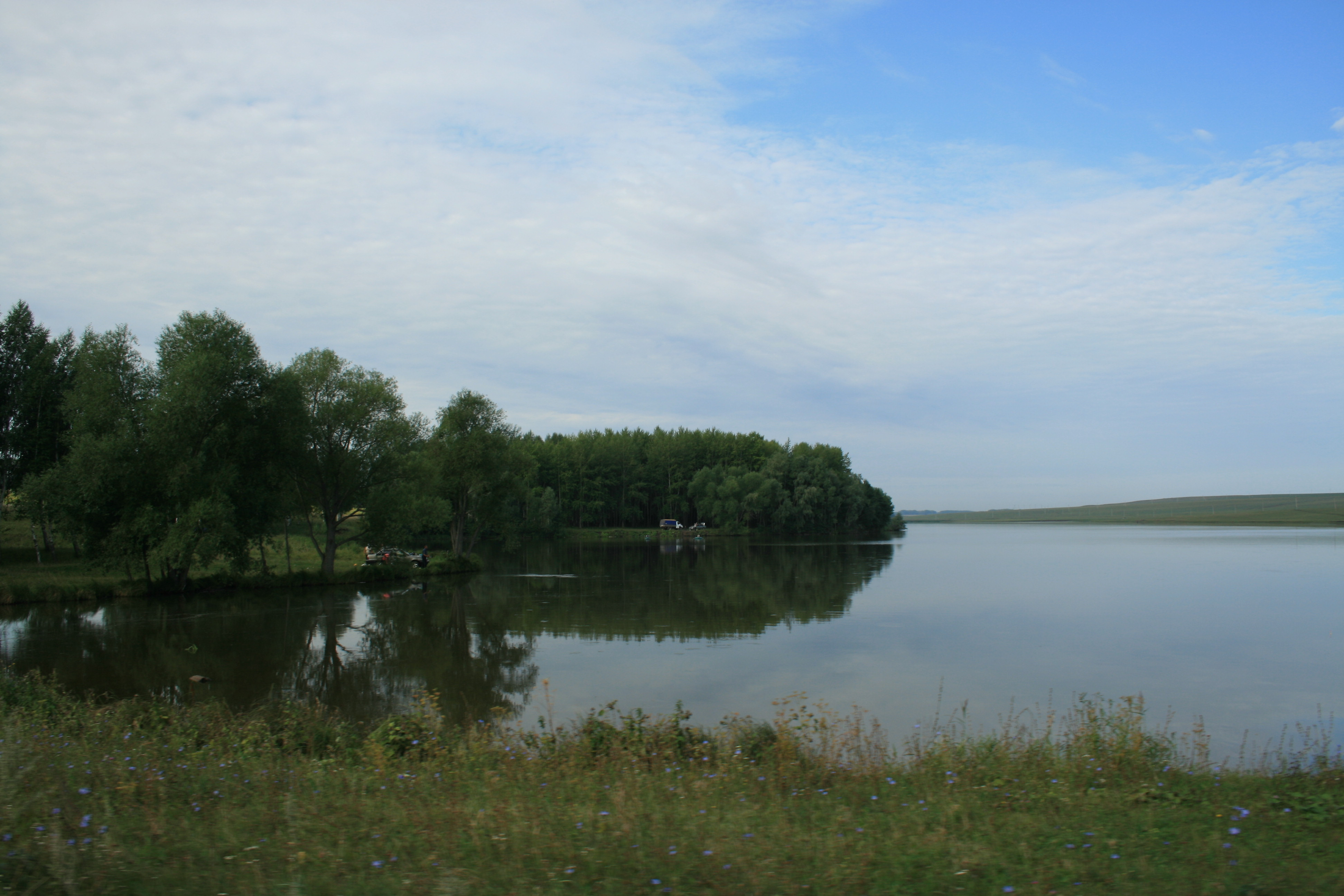
- Lake near Starobashirovo
- Interactive map of Starobashirovo
- Location of Starobashirovo Starobashirovo (Bashkortostan)
- Coordinates: 55°05′25″N 55°02′31″E
- Country: Russia
- Federal subject: Bashkortostan
- Administrative district: Chekmagushevsky District
- Selsoviet: Bashirovsky Selsoviet

Population
  - Estimate (January 2009): 472 )

Administrative status
  - Capital of: Bashirovsky Selsoviet

Municipal status
  - Municipal district: Chekmagushevsky Municipal District
  - Rural settlement: Bashirovsky Rural Settlement
  - Capital of: Bashirovsky Rural Settlement
- Time zone: UTC+5 (MSK+2)
- Postal code: 452207
- OKTMO ID: 80656410101

Starobashirovo (Russian: Старобаширово; Bashkir: Иҫке Бәшир, İśke Bäşir) is a rural locality (a selo) in Chekmagushevsky District of the Republic of Bashkortostan, Russia.
