= Petrovka, Staromatinsky Selsoviet, Bakalinsky District, Republic of Bashkortostan =

Petrovka Петровка
- Village
- Location within Bashkortostan Location within Russia
- Coordinates: 55°17′N 54°05′E
- Country: Russia
- Region: Bashkortostan
- District: Bakalinsky District
- Time zone: UTC+5:00

Petrovka (Russian: Петровка) is a rural locality (a village) in Staromatinsky Selsoviet, Bakalinsky District, Bashkortostan, Russia. The population was 16 as of 2010.

== Geography ==
It is located 26 km from Bakaly.
