= Yanybayevo =

Yanybayevo Яныбаево
- Selo
- Location within Bashkortostan Location within Russia
- Coordinates: 55°45′N 58°42′E
- Country: Russia
- Region: Bashkortostan
- District: Belokataysky District
- Time zone: UTC+5:00

Yanybayevo (Russian: Яныбаево; Bashkir: Яңыбай, Yañıbay) is a rural locality (a selo) and the administrative centre of Yanybayevsky Selsoviet, Belokataysky District, Bashkortostan, Russia. The population was 844 as of 2010. There are 13 streets.
