= Vetoshnikovo =

Vetoshnikovo Ветошниково
- Village
- Location within Bashkortostan Location within Russia
- Coordinates: 54°44′N 55°47′E
- Country: Russia
- Region: Bashkortostan
- District: Ufa
- Time zone: UTC+5:00

Vetoshnikovo (Russian: Ветошниково) is a rural locality (a village) in Ufa, Bashkortostan, Russia. The population was 260 as of 2010. There are 2 streets.

== Geography ==
Vetoshnikovo is located 20 km west of Ufa. Marmylevo is the nearest rural locality.
