= Gribovka, Ufimsky District, Republic of Bashkortostan =

Gribovka Грибовка
- Village
- Location within Bashkortostan Location within Russia
- Coordinates: 54°47′N 56°19′E
- Country: Russia
- Region: Bashkortostan
- District: Ufimsky District
- Time zone: UTC+5:00

Gribovka (Russian: Грибовка) is a rural locality (a village) in Kirillovsky Selsoviet, Ufimsky District, Bashkortostan, Russia. The population was 316 as of 2010. There are 8 streets.

== Geography ==
Gribovka is located 30 km northeast of Ufa (the district's administrative centre) by road. Kirillovo is the nearest rural locality.
