= Bashkortostan, Askinsky District, Republic of Bashkortostan =

Village in Askinsky District, Bashkortostan, Russia

Bashkortostan Башкортостан
- Village
- Location within Bashkortostan Location within Russia
- Coordinates: 56°14′N 56°15′E
- Country: Russia
- Region: Bashkortostan
- District: Askinsky District
- Time zone: UTC+5:00

Bashkortostan (Russian: Башкортостан; Bashkir: Башҡортостан, Başqortostan) is a rural locality (a village) in Kazanchinsky Selsoviet, Askinsky District, Bashkortostan, Russia. The population was 45 as of 2010. There is 1 street.

== Geography ==
It is located 40 km from Askino and 5 km from Starye Kazanchi.
