= Akhmetovo =

Akhmetovo (Russian: Ахметово) is the name of several rural localities in Russia:

- Akhmetovo, Abzelilovsky District, Republic of Bashkortostan
- Akhmetovo, Aurgazinsky District, Republic of Bashkortostan
- Akhmetovo, Blagovarsky District, Republic of Bashkortostan
- Akhmetovo, Chekmagushevsky District, Republic of Bashkortostan
- Akhmetovo, Kushnarenkovsky District, Republic of Bashkortostan
- Akhmetovo, Chuvash Republic, a village in Komsomolsky District of the Chuvash Republic
- Akhmetovo, Republic of Tatarstan, a village in Nurlatsky District of the Republic of Tatarstan
- zheleznodorozhnogo razyezda Akhmetovo, a settlement in Nurlatsky District the Republic of Tatarstan
