= Igmetovo =

Igmetovo Игметово
- Selo
- Location within Bashkortostan Location within Russia
- Coordinates: 55°24′N 54°32′E
- Country: Russia
- Region: Bashkortostan
- District: Ilishevsky District
- Time zone: UTC+5:00

Igmetovo (Russian: Игметово; Bashkir: Иғмәт, İğmät) is a rural locality (a selo) and the administrative centre of Igmetovsky Selsoviet, Ilishevsky District, Bashkortostan, Russia. The population was 296 as of 2010. There are 8 streets.

== Geography ==
Igmetovo is located 27 km southeast of Verkhneyarkeyevo (the district's administrative centre) by road. Abdullino is the nearest rural locality.
