= Ibragim, Ilishevsky District, Republic of Bashkortostan =

Ibragim Ибрагим
- Village
- Location within Bashkortostan Location within Russia
- Coordinates: 55°31′N 54°16′E
- Country: Russia
- Region: Bashkortostan
- District: Ilishevsky District
- Time zone: UTC+5:00

Ibragim (Russian: Ибрагим; Bashkir: Ибраһим, İbrahim) is a rural locality (a village) in Starokuktovsky Selsoviet, Ilishevsky District, Bashkortostan, Russia. The population was 132 as of 2010. There are 3 streets.

== Geography ==
Ibragim is located 17 km north of Verkhneyarkeyevo (the district's administrative centre) by road. Krasny Oktyabr is the nearest rural locality.
