= Yantuganovo =

Yantuganovo Янтуганово
- Village
- Location within Bashkortostan Location within Russia
- Coordinates: 55°18′N 54°23′E
- Country: Russia
- Region: Bashkortostan
- District: Ilishevsky District
- Time zone: UTC+5:00

Yantuganovo (Russian: Янтуганово; Bashkir: Янтуған, Yantuğan) is a rural locality (a village) in Syultinsky Selsoviet, Ilishevsky District, Bashkortostan, Russia. The population was 202 as of 2010. There are 2 streets.

== Geography ==
Yantuganovo is located 20 km south of Verkhneyarkeyevo (the district's administrative centre) by road. Syultino is the nearest rural locality.
