= Novonadyrovo =

Novonadyrovo Новонадырово
- Village
- Location within Bashkortostan Location within Russia
- Coordinates: 55°37′N 54°31′E
- Country: Russia
- Region: Bashkortostan
- District: Ilishevsky District
- Time zone: UTC+5:00

Novonadyrovo (Russian: Новонадырово; Bashkir: Яңы Нәдир, Yañı Nädir) is a rural locality (a village) in Bazitamaksky Selsoviet, Ilishevsky District, Bashkortostan, Russia. The population was 134 as of 2010. There are 2 streets.

== Geography ==
Novonadyrovo is located 36 km northeast of Verkhneyarkeyevo (the district's administrative centre) by road. Malotazeyevo is the nearest rural locality.
