= Novokutovo =

Novokutovo Новокутово
- Selo
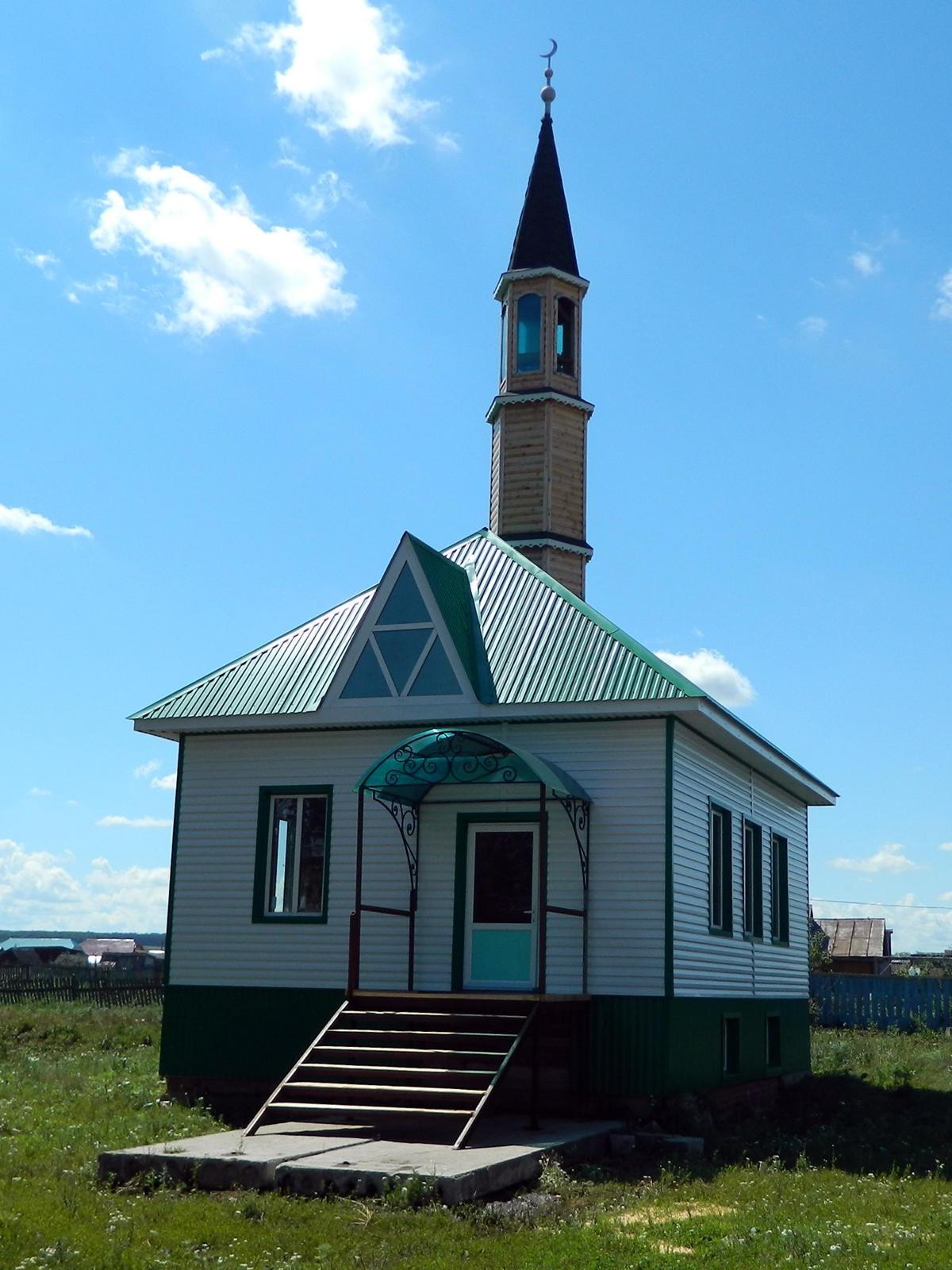

- Location within Bashkortostan Location within Russia
- Coordinates: 55°12′N 54°34′E
- Country: Russia
- Region: Bashkortostan
- District: Chekmagushevsky District
- Time zone: UTC+5:00

Novokutovo (Russian: Новокутово; Bashkir: Яңы Ҡото, Yañı Qoto) is a rural locality (a selo) and the administrative centre of Novokutovsky Selsoviet, Chekmagushevsky District, Bashkortostan, Russia. The population was 542 as of 2010. There are 8 streets.

== Geography ==
Novokutovo is located 9 km northwest of Chekmagush (the district's administrative centre) by road. Bikmetovo is the nearest rural locality.
