= Akkuzevo =

Akkuzevo Аккузево
- Selo
- Location within Bashkortostan Location within Russia
- Coordinates: 55°33′N 54°07′E
- Country: Russia
- Region: Bashkortostan
- District: Ilishevsky District
- Time zone: UTC+5:00

Akkuzevo (Russian: Аккузево; Bashkir: Аҡкүҙ, Aqküź) is a rural locality (a selo) and the administrative centre of Akkuzevsky Selsoviet, Ilishevsky District, Bashkortostan, Russia. The population was 492 as of 2010. There are 8 streets.

== Geography ==
Akkuzevo is located 24 km northwest of Verkhneyarkeyevo (the district's administrative centre) by road. Kipchakovo is the nearest rural locality.
