= Kyzyl-Yulduz, Chekmagushevsky District, Republic of Bashkortostan =

Kyzyl-Yulduz Кызыл-Юлдуз
- Village
- Location within Bashkortostan Location within Russia
- Coordinates: 54°59′N 54°41′E
- Country: Russia
- Region: Bashkortostan
- District: Chekmagushevsky District
- Time zone: UTC+5:00

Kyzyl-Yulduz (Russian: Кызыл-Юлдуз; Bashkir: Ҡыҙыл Йондоҙ, Qıźıl Yondoź) is a rural locality (a village) in Chekmagushevsky District, Bashkortostan, Russia. The population was 2 in 2010. There is one street.

== Geography ==
Kyzyl-Yulduz is located 25 km south of Chekmagush (the district's administrative centre) by road. Kusekeyevo is the nearest rural locality.
