= Turachi =

Turachi Турачи
- Village
- Location within Bashkortostan Location within Russia
- Coordinates: 55°30′N 54°00′E
- Country: Russia
- Region: Bashkortostan
- District: Ilishevsky District
- Time zone: UTC+5:00

Turachi (Russian: Турачи; Bashkir: Турасы, Turası) is a rural locality (a village) in Isametovsky Selsoviet, Ilishevsky District, Bashkortostan, Russia. The population was 205 as of 2010. There are 3 streets.

== Geography ==
Turachi is located 24 km northwest of Verkhneyarkeyevo (the district's administrative centre) by road. Zyaylevo is the nearest rural locality.
