= Novobikkino =

Novobikkino Новобиккино
- Selo
- Location within Bashkortostan Location within Russia
- Coordinates: 55°03′N 54°40′E
- Country: Russia
- Region: Bashkortostan
- District: Chekmagushevsky District
- Time zone: UTC+5:00

Novobikkino (Russian: Новобиккино; Bashkir: Яңы Биккенә, Yañı Bikkenä) is a rural locality (a selo) in Chekmagushevsky District, Bashkortostan, Russia. The population was 211 as of 2010. There are 2 streets.

== Geography ==
Novobikkino is located 10 km south of Chekmagush (the district's administrative centre) by road. Rapatovo is the nearest rural locality.
