= Kuzhbakhty =

Kuzhbakhty Кужбахты
- Selo
- Location within Bashkortostan Location within Russia
- Coordinates: 55°35′N 54°33′E
- Country: Russia
- Region: Bashkortostan
- District: Ilishevsky District
- Time zone: UTC+5:00

Kuzhbakhty (Russian: Кужбахты; Bashkir: Ҡужбаҡты, Qujbaqtı) is a rural locality (a selo) in Kuzhbakhtinsky Selsoviet, Ilishevsky District, Bashkortostan, Russia. The population was 372 as of 2010. There are 7 streets.

== Geography ==
Kuzhbakhty is located 31 km northeast of Verkhneyarkeyevo (the district's administrative centre) by road. Tazeyevo is the nearest rural locality.
