= Bikmetovo, Chekmagushevsky District, Republic of Bashkortostan =

Bikmetovo Бикметово
- Selo
- Location within Bashkortostan Location within Russia
- Coordinates: 55°11′N 54°30′E
- Country: Russia
- Region: Bashkortostan
- District: Chekmagushevsky District
- Time zone: UTC+5:00

Bikmetovo (Russian: Бикметово; Bashkir: Бикмәт, Bikmät) is a rural locality (a selo) in Chekmagushevsky District, Bashkortostan, Russia. The population was 109 as of 2010. There are 3 streets.

== Geography ==
Bikmetovo is located 15 km northwest of Chekmagush (the district's administrative centre) by road. Starye Chupty is the nearest rural locality.
