= Staryye Chupty =

Staryye Chupty Старые Чупты
- Village
- Location within Bashkortostan Location within Russia
- Coordinates: 55°10′N 54°32′E
- Country: Russia
- Region: Bashkortostan
- District: Chekmagushevsky District
- Time zone: UTC+5:00

Staryye Chupty (Russian: Старые Чупты; Bashkir: Иҫке Супты, İśke Suptı) is a rural locality (a village) in Chekmagushevsky District, Bashkortostan, Russia. The population was 16 as of 2010. There is 1 street.

== Geography ==
Staryye Chupty is located 10 km northwest of Chekmagush (the district's administrative centre) by road. Bikmetovo is the nearest rural locality.
