= Isametovo =

Isametovo Исаметово
- Selo
- Location within Bashkortostan Location within Russia
- Coordinates: 55°28′N 54°02′E
- Country: Russia
- Region: Bashkortostan
- District: Ilishevsky District
- Time zone: UTC+5:00

Isametovo (Russian: Исаметово; Bashkir: Исәмәт, İsämät) is a rural locality (a selo) and the administrative centre of Isametovsky Selsoviet, Ilishevsky District, Bashkortostan, Russia. The population was 728 as of 2010. There are 7 streets.

== Geography ==
Isametovo is located 18 km west of Verkhneyarkeyevo (the district's administrative centre) by road. Zyaylevo is the nearest rural locality.
