= Tashchishma =

Tashchishma Ташчишма
- Village
- Location within Bashkortostan Location within Russia
- Coordinates: 55°16′N 54°31′E
- Country: Russia
- Region: Bashkortostan
- District: Ilishevsky District
- Time zone: UTC+5:00

Tashchishma (Russian: Ташчишма; Bashkir: Ташшишмә, Taşşişmä) is a rural locality (a village) in Bishkurayevsky Selsoviet, Ilishevsky District, Bashkortostan, Russia. The population was 9 as of 2010. There is 1 street.

== Geography ==
Tashchishma is located 36 km southeast of Verkhneyarkeyevo (the district's administrative centre) by road. Lena is the nearest rural locality.
