= Kipchakovo =

Kipchakovo Кипчаково
- Village
- Location within Bashkortostan Location within Russia
- Coordinates: 55°34′N 54°04′E
- Country: Russia
- Region: Bashkortostan
- District: Ilishevsky District
- Time zone: UTC+5:00

Kipchakovo (Russian: Кипчаково; Bashkir: Ҡыпсаҡ, Qıpsaq) is a rural locality (a village) in Akkuzevsky Selsoviet, Ilishevsky District, Bashkortostan, Russia. The population was 123 as of 2010. There are 3 streets.

== Geography ==
Kipchakovo is located 28 km northwest of Verkhneyarkeyevo (the district's administrative centre) by road. Shammetovo is the nearest rural locality.
