= Kadyrovo, Ilishevsky District, Republic of Bashkortostan =

Kadyrovo Кадырово
- Selo
- Location within Bashkortostan Location within Russia
- Coordinates: 55°21′N 54°02′E
- Country: Russia
- Region: Bashkortostan
- District: Ilishevsky District
- Time zone: UTC+5:00

Kadyrovo (Russian: Кадырово; Bashkir: Ҡәҙер, Qäźer) is a rural locality (a selo) and the administrative centre of Kadyrovsky Selsoviet, Ilishevsky District, Bashkortostan, Russia. The population was 754 as of 2010. There are 12 streets.

== Geography ==
Kadyrovo is located 23 km southwest of Verkhneyarkeyevo (the district's administrative centre) by road. Kyzyl-Kuch is the nearest rural locality.
