= Novoatashevo =

Novoatashevo Новоаташево
- Village
- Location within Bashkortostan Location within Russia
- Coordinates: 55°15′N 54°25′E
- Country: Russia
- Region: Bashkortostan
- District: Ilishevsky District
- Time zone: UTC+5:00

Novoatashevo (Russian: Новоаташево; Bashkir: Яңы Аташ, Yañı Ataş) is a rural locality (a village) in Syultinsky Selsoviet, Ilishevsky District, Bashkortostan, Russia. The population was 79 as of 2010. There are 2 streets.

== Geography ==
Novoatashevo is located 26 km south of Verkhneyarkeyevo (the district's administrative centre) by road. Syultino is the nearest rural locality.
