= Ablaevo, Chekmagushevsky District, Bashkortostan =

Ablaevo Аблаево Аблай Ablay
- Selo
- Location within Bashkortostan Location within Russia
- Coordinates: 54°58′N 54°51′E
- Country: Russia
- Region: Bashkortostan
- District: Chekmagushevsky District
- Time zone: [[UTC+5:00]]

Ablaevo (Russian: Аблаево; Bashkir: Аблай, Ablay) is a rural locality (a selo) in Urnyaksky Selsoviet of Chekmagushevsky District, Bashkortostan, Russia. The population was 1,067 as of 2010. There are 9 streets.

== Geography ==
Ablaevo is located 24 km southeast of Chekmagush (the district's administrative centre) by road. Novobakayevo is the nearest rural locality.
