= Kargaly, Republic of Bashkortostan =

Kargaly Каргалы
- Selo
- Location within Bashkortostan Location within Russia
- Coordinates: 55°15′N 54°47′E
- Country: Russia
- Region: Bashkortostan
- District: Chekmagushevsky District
- Time zone: UTC+5:00

Kargaly (Russian: Каргалы; Bashkir: Ҡарғалы, Qarğalı) is a rural locality (a selo) in Chekmagushevsky District, Bashkortostan, Russia. The population was 161 as of 2010. There are 4 streets.

== Geography ==
Kargaly is located 20 km northeast of Chekmagush (the district's administrative centre) by road. Karazirikovo is the nearest rural locality.
