= Nizhnecherekulevo =

Nizhnecherekulevo Нижнечерекулево
- Selo
- Location within Bashkortostan Location within Russia
- Coordinates: 55°30′N 54°24′E
- Country: Russia
- Region: Bashkortostan
- District: Ilishevsky District
- Time zone: UTC+5:00

Nizhnecherekulevo (Russian: Нижнечерекулево; Bashkir: Түбәнге Сереккүл, Tübänge Serekkül) is a rural locality (a selo) and the administrative centre of Cherekulevsky Selsoviet, Ilishevsky District, Bashkortostan, Russia. The population was 573 as of 2010. There are 8 streets.

== Geography ==
Nizhnecherekulevo is located 9 km northeast of Verkhneyarkeyevo (the district's administrative centre) by road. Verkhnecherekulevo is the nearest rural locality.
