= Rsayevo =

Rsayevo Рсаево
- Selo
- Location within Bashkortostan Location within Russia
- Coordinates: 55°21′N 54°21′E
- Country: Russia
- Region: Bashkortostan
- District: Ilishevsky District
- Time zone: UTC+5:00

Rsayevo (Russian: Рсаево; Bashkir: Рсай, Rsay) is a rural locality (a selo) and the administrative centre of Rsayevsky Selsoviet, Ilishevsky District, Bashkortostan, Russia. The population was 926 as of 2010. There are 9 streets.

== Geography ==
Rsayevo is located 13 km south of Verkhneyarkeyevo (the district's administrative centre) by road. Yunny is the nearest rural locality.
