= Telekeyevo =

Telekeyevo Телекеево
- Village
- Location within Bashkortostan Location within Russia
- Coordinates: 55°37′N 54°19′E
- Country: Russia
- Region: Bashkortostan
- District: Ilishevsky District
- Time zone: UTC+5:00

Telekeyevo (Russian: Телекеево; Bashkir: Теләкәй, Teläkäy) is a rural locality (a village) in Isanbayevsky Selsoviet, Ilishevsky District, Bashkortostan, Russia. The population was 316 as of 2010. There are 5 streets.

== Geography ==
Telekeyevo is located 24 km north of Verkhneyarkeyevo (the district's administrative centre) by road. Krasnoyarovo is the nearest rural locality.
