= Kavkaz, Republic of Bashkortostan =

Kavkaz Кавказ
- Village
- Location within Bashkortostan Location within Russia
- Coordinates: 55°07′N 54°54′E
- Country: Russia
- Region: Bashkortostan
- District: Chekmagushevsky District
- Time zone: UTC+5:00

Kavkaz (Russian: Кавказ) is a rural locality (a village) in Chekmagushevsky District, Bashkortostan, Russia. The population was 9 as of 2010. There is 1 street.

== Geography ==
Kavkaz is located 18 km east of Chekmagush (the district's administrative centre) by road. Starokalmashevo is the nearest rural locality.
