= Starobiktovo =

Starobiktovo Старобиктово
- Village
- Location within Bashkortostan Location within Russia
- Coordinates: 55°40′N 54°19′E
- Country: Russia
- Region: Bashkortostan
- District: Ilishevsky District
- Time zone: UTC+5:00

Starobiktovo (Russian: Старобиктово; Bashkir: Иҫке Бейектау, İśke Beyektaw) is a rural locality (a village) in Novomedvedevsky Selsoviet, Ilishevsky District, Bashkortostan, Russia. The population was 63 as of 2010. There is 1 street.

== Geography ==
Starobiktovo is located 34 km north of Verkhneyarkeyevo (the district's administrative centre) by road. Starokirgizovo is the nearest rural locality.
