= Novobaltachevo, Chekmagushevsky District, Republic of Bashkortostan =

Novobaltachevo Новобалтачево
- Selo
- Location within Bashkortostan Location within Russia
- Coordinates: 55°06′N 54°25′E
- Country: Russia
- Region: Bashkortostan
- District: Chekmagushevsky District
- Time zone: UTC+5:00

Novobaltachevo (Russian: Новобалтачево; Bashkir: Яңы Балтас, Yañı Baltas) is a rural locality (a selo) and the administrative centre of Novobaltachevsky Selsoviet, Chekmagushevsky District, Bashkortostan, Russia. The population was 820 as of 2010. There are 7 streets.

== Geography ==
Novobaltachevo is located 16 km west of Chekmagush (the district's administrative centre) by road. Lenino is the nearest rural locality.
