= Kusekeyevo, Chekmagushevsky District, Republic of Bashkortostan =

Kusekeyevo Кусекеево
- Selo
- Location within Bashkortostan Location within Russia
- Coordinates: 54°59′N 54°44′E
- Country: Russia
- Region: Bashkortostan
- District: Chekmagushevsky District
- Time zone: UTC+5:00

Kusekeyevo (Russian: Кусекеево; Bashkir: Күсәкәй, Küsäkäy) is a rural locality (a selo) in Chekmagushevsky District, Bashkortostan, Russia. The population was 349 as of 2010. There are 3 streets.

== Geography ==
Kusekeyevo is located 22 km south of Chekmagush (the district's administrative centre) by road. Kyzyl-Yulduz is the nearest rural locality.
