= Tuzlukushevo =

Tuzlukushevo Тузлукушево
- Selo
- Location within Bashkortostan Location within Russia
- Coordinates: 55°12′N 54°49′E
- Country: Russia
- Region: Bashkortostan
- District: Chekmagushevsky District
- Time zone: UTC+5:00

Tuzlukushevo (Russian: Тузлукушево; Bashkir: Туҙлыҡыуыш, Tuźlıqıwış) is a rural locality (a selo) and the administrative centre of Tuzlukushevsky Selsoviet, Chekmagushevsky District, Bashkortostan, Russia. The population was 530 as of 2010. There are 4 streets.

== Geography ==
Tuzlukushevo is located 16 km northeast of Chekmagush (the district's administrative centre) by road. Taskakly is the nearest rural locality.
