= Zyaylevo =

Zyaylevo Зяйлево
- Village
- Location within Bashkortostan Location within Russia
- Coordinates: 55°28′N 54°02′E
- Country: Russia
- Region: Bashkortostan
- District: Ilishevsky District
- Time zone: UTC+5:00

Zyaylevo (Russian: Зяйлево; Bashkir: Йәйләү, Yäyläw) is a rural locality (a village) in Isametovsky Selsoviet, Ilishevsky District, Bashkortostan, Russia. The population was 181 as of 2010. There are 2 streets.

== Geography ==
Zyaylevo is located 5 km north of Verkhneyarkeyevo (the district's administrative centre) by road.
