= Starobikkino =

Starobikkino Старобиккино
- Selo
- Location within Bashkortostan Location within Russia
- Coordinates: 55°01′N 54°34′E
- Country: Russia
- Region: Bashkortostan
- District: Chekmagushevsky District
- Time zone: UTC+5:00

Starobikkino (Russian: Старобиккино; Bashkir: Иҫке Биккенә, İśke Bikkenä) is a rural locality (a selo) in Chekmagushevsky District, Bashkortostan, Russia. The population was 236 as of 2010. There are 3 streets.

== Geography ==
Starobikkino is located 15 km south of Chekmagush (the district's administrative centre) by road. Kalmashbashevo is the nearest rural locality.
