= Novyye Karyavdy =

Novyye Karyavdy Новые Карьявды
- Selo
- Location within Bashkortostan Location within Russia
- Coordinates: 55°02′N 54°21′E
- Country: Russia
- Region: Bashkortostan
- District: Chekmagushevsky District
- Time zone: UTC+5:00

Novyye Karyavdy (Russian: Новые Карьявды; Bashkir: Яңы Ҡаръяуҙы, Yañı Qaryawźı) is a rural locality (a selo) in Chekmagushevsky District, Bashkortostan, Russia. The population was 276 as of 2010. There are 2 streets.

== Geography ==
Novyye Karyavdy is located 26 km southwest of Chekmagush (the district's administrative centre) by road. Verkhniye Karyavdy is the nearest rural locality.
