= Telepanovo =

Telepanovo Телепаново
- Village
- Location within Bashkortostan Location within Russia
- Coordinates: 55°32′N 54°29′E
- Country: Russia
- Region: Bashkortostan
- District: Ilishevsky District
- Time zone: UTC+5:00

Telepanovo (Russian: Телепаново; Bashkir: Теләпән, Teläpän) is a rural locality (a village) in Iteyevsky Selsoviet, Ilishevsky District, Bashkortostan, Russia. The population was 307 as of 2010. There are 3 streets.

== Geography ==
Telepanovo is located 23 km northeast of Verkhneyarkeyevo (the district's administrative centre) by road. Iteyevo is the nearest rural locality.
