= Baybulatovo =

Baybulatovo Байбулатово
- Selo
- Location within Bashkortostan Location within Russia
- Coordinates: 55°04′N 54°18′E
- Country: Russia
- Region: Bashkortostan
- District: Chekmagushevsky District
- Time zone: UTC+5:00

Baybulatovo (Russian: Байбулатово; Bashkir: Байбулат, Baybulat) is a rural locality (a selo) in Chekmagushevsky District, Bashkortostan, Russia. The population was 205 as of 2010. There are 4 streets.

== Geography ==
Baybulatovo is located 23 km southwest of Chekmagush (the district's administrative centre) by road. Rezyapovo is the nearest rural locality.
