= Starouzmyashevo =

Starouzmyashevo Староузмяшево
- Selo
- Location within Bashkortostan Location within Russia
- Coordinates: 55°02′N 54°25′E
- Country: Russia
- Region: Bashkortostan
- District: Chekmagushevsky District
- Time zone: UTC+5:00

Starouzmyashevo (Russian: Староузмяшево; Bashkir: Иҫке Үҙмәш, İśke Üźmäş) is a rural locality (a selo) in Chekmagushevsky District, Bashkortostan, Russia. The population was 122 as of 2010. There is 1 street.

== Geography ==
Starouzmyashevo is located 25 km southwest of Chekmagush (the district's administrative centre) by road. Verkhniye Karyavdy is the nearest rural locality.
