= Nizhneyarkeyevo =

Nizhneyarkeyevo Нижнеяркеево
- Selo
- Location within Bashkortostan Location within Russia
- Coordinates: 55°27′N 54°19′E
- Country: Russia
- Region: Bashkortostan
- District: Ilishevsky District
- Time zone: UTC+5:00

Nizhneyarkeyevo (Russian: Нижнеяркеево; Bashkir: Түбәнге Йәркәй, Tübänge Yärkäy) is a rural locality (a selo) and the administrative centre of Yunnovsky Selsoviet, Ilishevsky District, Bashkortostan, Russia. The population was 977 as of 2010. There are 40 streets.

== Geography ==
Nizhneyarkeyevo is located 3 km northeast of Verkhneyarkeyevo (the district's administrative centre) by road. Verkhneyarkeyevo is the nearest rural locality.
