= Marino, Ilishevsky District, Republic of Bashkortostan =

Marino Марино
- Village
- Location within Bashkortostan Location within Russia
- Coordinates: 55°41′N 54°30′E
- Country: Russia
- Region: Bashkortostan
- District: Ilishevsky District
- Time zone: UTC+5:00

Marino (Russian: Марино) is a rural locality (a village) in Andreyevsky Selsoviet, Ilishevsky District, Bashkortostan, Russia. The population was 155 as of 2010. There are 2 streets.

== Geography ==
Marino is located 37 km north of Verkhneyarkeyevo (the district's administrative centre) by road. Shidali is the nearest rural locality.
