= Irmashevo =

Irmashevo Ирмашево
- Village
- Location within Bashkortostan Location within Russia
- Coordinates: 55°24′N 54°25′E
- Country: Russia
- Region: Bashkortostan
- District: Ilishevsky District
- Time zone: UTC+5:00

Irmashevo (Russian: Ирмашево; Bashkir: Ирмәш, İrmäş) is a rural locality (a village) in Yunnovsky Selsoviet, Ilishevsky District, Bashkortostan, Russia. The population was 10 as of 2010. There is one main street.

== Geography ==
Irmashevo is located 14 km southeast of Verkhneyarkeyevo (the district's administrative centre) by road. Kayenlyk is the nearest rural locality.
