= Chishma-Karan =

Chishma-Karan Чишма-Каран
- Village
- Location within Bashkortostan Location within Russia
- Coordinates: 55°00′N 54°19′E
- Country: Russia
- Region: Bashkortostan
- District: Chekmagushevsky District
- Time zone: UTC+5:00

Chishma-Karan (Russian: Чишма-Каран; Bashkir: Шишмә-Ҡаран, Şişmä-Qaran) is a rural locality (a village) in Chekmagushevsky District, Bashkortostan, Russia. The population was 28 as of 2010. There is 1 street.

== Geography ==
Chishma-Karan is located 31 km southwest of Chekmagush (the district's administrative centre) by road. Rozhdestvenka is the nearest rural locality.
