= Bulyak, Ilishevsky District, Republic of Bashkortostan =

Bulyak Буляк
- Selo
- Location within Bashkortostan Location within Russia
- Coordinates: 55°20′N 54°26′E
- Country: Russia
- Region: Bashkortostan
- District: Ilishevsky District
- Time zone: UTC+5:00

Bulyak (Russian: Буляк; Bashkir: Бүләк, Büläk) is a rural locality (a selo) in Igmetovsky Selsoviet, Ilishevsky District, Bashkortostan, Russia. The population was 20 as of 2010.

== Geography ==
Bulyak is located 19 km north of Verkhneyarkeyevo (the district's administrative centre) by road. Tashkichi is the nearest rural locality.
