= Ashmanovo =

Ashmanovo Ашманово
- Village
- Location within Bashkortostan Location within Russia
- Coordinates: 55°29′N 54°26′E
- Country: Russia
- Region: Bashkortostan
- District: Ilishevsky District
- Time zone: UTC+5:00

Ashmanovo (Russian: Ашманово; Bashkir: Ашман, Aşman) is a rural locality (a village) in Ishkarovsky Selsoviet, Ilishevsky District, Bashkortostan, Russia. The population was 15 as of 2010. There is 1 street.

== Geography ==
Ashmanovo is located 15 km east of Verkhneyarkeyevo (the district's administrative centre) by road. Nizhnecherekulevo is the nearest rural locality.
