= Taynyashevo =

Taynyashevo Тайняшево
- Selo
- Location within Bashkortostan Location within Russia
- Coordinates: 55°10′N 54°24′E
- Country: Russia
- Region: Bashkortostan
- District: Chekmagushevsky District
- Time zone: UTC+5:00

Taynyashevo (Russian: Тайняшево; Bashkir: Тайнаш, Taynaş) is a rural locality (a selo) in Chekmagushevsky District, Bashkortostan, Russia. The population was 487 as of 2010. There are 6 streets.

== Geography ==
Taynyashevo is located 23 km northwest of Chekmagush (the district's administrative centre) by road. Starobalakovo is the nearest rural locality.
