= Taskakly =

Taskakly Таскаклы
- Selo
- Location within Bashkortostan Location within Russia
- Coordinates: 55°12′N 54°53′E
- Country: Russia
- Region: Bashkortostan
- District: Chekmagushevsky District
- Time zone: UTC+5:00

Taskakly (Russian: Таскаклы; Bashkir: Таҫҡаҡлы, Taśqaqlı) is a rural locality (a selo) in Chekmagushevsky District, Bashkortostan, Russia. The population was 154 as of 2010. There are 2 streets.

== Geography ==
Taskakly is located 21 km northeast of Chekmagush (the district's administrative centre) by road. Tuzlukushevo is the nearest rural locality.
