= Karatalovo =

Karatalovo Караталово
- Selo
- Location within Bashkortostan Location within Russia
- Coordinates: 54°57′N 54°21′E
- Country: Russia
- Region: Bashkortostan
- District: Chekmagushevsky District
- Time zone: UTC+5:00

Karatalovo (Russian: Караталово; Bashkir: Ҡаратал, Qaratal) is a rural locality (a selo) in Chekmagushevsky District, Bashkortostan, Russia. The population was 212 as of 2010. There are 2 streets.

== Geography ==
Karatalovo is located 40 km southwest of Chekmagush (the district's administrative centre) by road. Novopuchkakovo is the nearest rural locality.
