= Novoyumranovo =

Novoyumranovo Новоюмраново
- Village
- Location within Bashkortostan Location within Russia
- Coordinates: 55°07′N 55°04′E
- Country: Russia
- Region: Bashkortostan
- District: Chekmagushevsky District
- Time zone: UTC+5:00

Novoyumranovo (Russian: Новоюмраново; Bashkir: Яңы Йомран, Yañı Yomran) is a rural locality (a village) in Chekmagushevsky District, Bashkortostan, Russia. The population was 55 as of 2010. There is 1 street.

== Geography ==
Novoyumranovo is located 31 km east of Chekmagush (the district's administrative centre) by road. Novokalmashevo is the nearest rural locality.
