= Syngryanovo =

Syngryanovo Сынгряново
- Village
- Location within Bashkortostan Location within Russia
- Coordinates: 55°21′N 53°54′E
- Country: Russia
- Region: Bashkortostan
- District: Ilishevsky District
- Time zone: UTC+5:00

Syngryanovo (Russian: Сынгряново; Bashkir: Һеңрән, Heñrän) is a rural locality (a village) in Kadyrovsky Selsoviet, Ilishevsky District, Bashkortostan, Russia. The population was 388 as of 2010. There are 7 streets.

== Geography ==
Syngryanovo is located 31 km southwest of Verkhneyarkeyevo (the district's administrative centre) by road. Novoilikovo is the nearest rural locality.
