= Dyumeyevo =

Dyumeyevo Дюмеево
- Selo
- Location within Bashkortostan Location within Russia
- Coordinates: 55°15′N 54°20′E
- Country: Russia
- Region: Bashkortostan
- District: Ilishevsky District
- Time zone: UTC+5:00

Dyumeyevo (Russian: Дюмеево; Bashkir: Дөмәй, Dömäy) is a rural locality (a selo) and the administrative centre of Dyumeyevsky Selsoviet, Ilishevsky District, Bashkortostan, Russia. The population was 851 as of 2010. There are 5 streets.

== Geography ==
Dyumeyevo is located 25 km south of Verkhneyarkeyevo (the district's administrative centre) by road. Baza-Kuyanovo is the nearest rural locality.
