= Staronadyrovo =

Staronadyrovo Старонадырово
- Village
- Location within Bashkortostan Location within Russia
- Coordinates: 55°38′N 54°31′E
- Country: Russia
- Region: Bashkortostan
- District: Ilishevsky District
- Time zone: UTC+5:00

Staronadyrovo (Russian: Старонадырово; Bashkir: Иҫке Нәдир, İśke Nädir) is a rural locality (a village) in Bazitamaksky Selsoviet, Ilishevsky District, Bashkortostan, Russia. The population was 89 as of 2010. There is 1 street.

== Geography ==
Staronadyrovo is located 37 km northeast of Verkhneyarkeyevo (the district's administrative centre) by road. Novonadyrovo is the nearest rural locality.
