= Syyryshbashevo =

Syyryshbashevo Сыйрышбашево
- Selo
- Location within Bashkortostan Location within Russia
- Coordinates: 55°12′N 54°44′E
- Country: Russia
- Region: Bashkortostan
- District: Chekmagushevsky District
- Time zone: UTC+5:00

Syyryshbashevo (Russian: Сыйрышбашево; Bashkir: Сыйрышбаш, Sıyrışbaş) is a rural locality (a selo) in Chekmagushevsky District, Bashkortostan, Russia. The population was 559 as of 2010. There are 4 streets.

== Geography ==
Syyryshbashevo is located 14 km northeast of Chekmagush (the district's administrative centre) by road. Tuzlukushevo is the nearest rural locality.
