= Novopuchkakovo =

Novopuchkakovo Новопучкаково
- Village
- Location within Bashkortostan Location within Russia
- Coordinates: 54°55′N 54°22′E
- Country: Russia
- Region: Bashkortostan
- District: Chekmagushevsky District
- Time zone: UTC+5:00

Novopuchkakovo (Russian: Новопучкаково; Bashkir: Яңы Боҫҡаҡ, Yañı Bośqaq) is a rural locality (a village) in Chekmagushevsky District, Bashkortostan, Russia. The population was 90 as of 2010. There is 1 street.

== Geography ==
Novopuchkakovo is located 42 km southwest of Chekmagush (the district's administrative centre) by road. Pokrovka is the nearest rural locality.
