= Igenche, Chekmagushevsky District, Republic of Bashkortostan =

Igenche Игенче
- Village
- Location within Bashkortostan Location within Russia
- Coordinates: 55°09′N 54°35′E
- Country: Russia
- Region: Bashkortostan
- District: Chekmagushevsky District
- Time zone: UTC+5:00

Igenche (Russian: Игенче; Bashkir: Игенсе, İgense) is a rural locality (a village) in Chekmagushevsky District, Bashkortostan, Russia. The population was 110 as of 2010. There are 2 streets.

== Geography ==
Igenche is located 5 km northwest of Chekmagush (the district's administrative centre) by road. Chekmagush is the nearest rural locality.
