= Verkhneye Yuldashevo =

Verkhneye Yuldashevo Верхнее Юлдашево
- Village
- Location within Bashkortostan Location within Russia
- Coordinates: 55°41′N 54°16′E
- Country: Russia
- Region: Bashkortostan
- District: Ilishevsky District
- Time zone: UTC+5:00

Verkhneye Yuldashevo (Russian: Верхнее Юлдашево; Bashkir: Үрге Юлдаш, Ürge Yuldaş) is a rural locality (a village) in Yabalakovsky Selsoviet, Ilishevsky District, Bashkortostan, Russia. The population was 216 as of 2010. There are 3 streets.

== Geography ==
Verkhneye Yuldashevo is located 36 km north of Verkhneyarkeyevo (the district's administrative centre) by road. Starokirgizovo is the nearest rural locality.
