= Ishteryakovo =

Ishteryakovo Иштеряково
- Village
- Location within Bashkortostan Location within Russia
- Coordinates: 55°22′N 54°11′E
- Country: Russia
- Region: Bashkortostan
- District: Ilishevsky District
- Time zone: UTC+5:00

Ishteryakovo (Russian: Иштеряково; Bashkir: Иштирәк, İştiräk) is a rural locality (a village) in Karabashevsky Selsoviet, Ilishevsky District, Bashkortostan, Russia. The population was 492 as of 2010. There are 7 streets.

== Geography ==
Ishteryakovo is located 14 km southwest of Verkhneyarkeyevo (the district's administrative centre) by road. Karabashevo is the nearest rural locality.
