= Isanbayevo =

Isanbayevo Исанбаево
- Selo
- Location within Bashkortostan Location within Russia
- Coordinates: 55°33′N 54°13′E
- Country: Russia
- Region: Bashkortostan
- District: Ilishevsky District
- Time zone: UTC+5:00

Isamnayevo (Russian: Исанбаево; Bashkir: Иҫәнбай, İśänbay) is a rural locality (a selo) and the administrative centre of Isanbayevsky Selsoviet, Ilishevsky District, Bashkortostan, Russia. The population was 523 as of 2010. There are 5 streets.

== Geography ==
Isanbayevo is located 18 km north of Verkhneyarkeyevo (the district's administrative centre) by road. Krasny Oktyabr is the nearest rural locality.
