= Staropuchkakovo =

Staropuchkakovo Старопучкаково
- Selo
- Location within Bashkortostan Location within Russia
- Coordinates: 54°59′N 54°28′E
- Country: Russia
- Region: Bashkortostan
- District: Chekmagushevsky District
- Time zone: UTC+5:00

Staropuchkakovo (Russian: Старопучкаково; Bashkir: Иҫке Боҫҡаҡ, İśke Bośqaq) is a rural locality (a selo) in Chekmagushevsky District, Bashkortostan, Russia. The population was 276 as of 2010. There is 1 street.

== Geography ==
Staropuchkakovo is located 29 km southwest of Chekmagush (the district's administrative centre) by road. Novosemenkino is the nearest rural locality.
