= Kyzyl-Bayrak, Ilishevsky District, Republic of Bashkortostan =

Kyzyl-Bayrak Кызыл-Байрак
- Village
- Location within Bashkortostan Location within Russia
- Coordinates: 55°26′N 54°29′E
- Country: Russia
- Region: Bashkortostan
- District: Ilishevsky District
- Time zone: UTC+5:00

Kyzyl-Bayrak (Russian: Кызыл-Байрак; Bashkir: Ҡыҙыл Байраҡ, Qıźıl Bayraq) is a rural locality (a village) in Ishkarovsky Selsoviet, Ilishevsky District, Bashkortostan, Russia. The population was 62 as of 2010. There are 2 streets.

== Geography ==
Kyzyl-Bayrak is located 20 km east of Verkhneyarkeyevo (the district's administrative centre) by road. Ishkarovo is the nearest rural locality.
