= Novoikhsanovo =

Novoikhsanovo Новоихсаново
- Selo
- Location within Bashkortostan Location within Russia
- Coordinates: 55°04′N 54°55′E
- Country: Russia
- Region: Bashkortostan
- District: Chekmagushevsky District
- Time zone: UTC+5:00

Novoikhsanovo (Russian: Новоихсаново; Bashkir: Яңы Ихсан, Yañı İxsan) is a rural locality (a selo) in Chekmagushevsky District, Bashkortostan, Russia. The population was 138 as of 2010. There are 3 streets.

== Geography ==
Novoikhsanovo is located 24 km southeast of Chekmagush (the district's administrative centre) by road. Kinderkulevo is the nearest rural locality.
