= Tashkalmashevo =

Tashkalmashevo Ташкалмашево
- Selo
- Location within Bashkortostan Location within Russia
- Coordinates: 55°07′N 54°57′E
- Country: Russia
- Region: Bashkortostan
- District: Chekmagushevsky District
- Time zone: UTC+5:00

Tashkalmashevo (Russian: Ташкалмашево; Bashkir: Ташҡалмаш, Taşqalmaş) is a rural locality (a selo) in Chekmagushevsky District, Bashkortostan, Russia. The population was 240 as of 2010. There are 2 streets.

== Geography ==
Tashkalmashevo is located 22 km east of Chekmagush (the district's administrative centre) by road. Starokalmashevo is the nearest rural locality.
