= Tupeyevo =

Tupeyevo Тупеево
- Village
- Location within Bashkortostan Location within Russia
- Coordinates: 55°16′N 54°10′E
- Country: Russia
- Region: Bashkortostan
- District: Ilishevsky District
- Time zone: UTC+5:00

Tupeyevo (Russian: Тупеево; Bashkir: Тыпый, Tıpıy) is a rural locality (a village) in Urmetovsky Selsoviet, Ilishevsky District, Bashkortostan, Russia. The population was 415 as of 2010. There are 5 streets.

== Geography ==
Tupeyevo is located 29 km southwest of Verkhneyarkeyevo (the district's administrative centre) by road. Taktagulovo is the nearest rural locality.
