= Bardasly =

Bardasly Бардаслы
- Selo
- Location within Bashkortostan Location within Russia
- Coordinates: 54°56′N 54°46′E
- Country: Russia
- Region: Bashkortostan
- District: Chekmagushevsky District
- Time zone: UTC+5:00

Bardasly (Russian: Бардаслы; Bashkir: Бәрҙәсле, Bärźäsle) is a rural locality (a selo) in Chekmagushevsky District, Bashkortostan, Russia. The population was 120 as of 2010. There are 4 streets.

== Geography ==
Bardasly is located 31 km southeast of Chekmagush (the district's administrative centre) by road. Staroabzanovo is the nearest rural locality.
