= Starosurmetovo =

Starosurmetovo Старосурметово
- Selo
- Location within Bashkortostan Location within Russia
- Coordinates: 55°03′N 54°15′E
- Country: Russia
- Region: Bashkortostan
- District: Chekmagushevsky District
- Time zone: UTC+5:00

Starosurmetovo (Russian: Старосурметово; Bashkir: Иҫке Сөрмәт, İśke Sörmät) is a rural locality (a selo) in Chekmagushevsky District, Bashkortostan, Russia. As of 2010, the population was 7. The locality has one street.

== Geography ==
Starosurmetovo is located 29 km southwest of Chekmagush, the district's administrative centre, by road.The nearest rural locality is Nana Birde.
