= Iteyevo =

Iteyevo Итеево
- Selo
- Location within Bashkortostan Location within Russia
- Coordinates: 55°31′N 54°27′E
- Country: Russia
- Region: Bashkortostan
- District: Ilishevsky District
- Time zone: UTC+5:00

Iteyevo (Russian: Итеево; Bashkir: Этәй, Etäy) is a rural locality (a selo) and the administrative centre of Iteyevsky Selsoviet, Ilishevsky District, Bashkortostan, Russia. The population was 506 as of 2010. There are 2 streets.

== Geography ==
Iteyevo is located 14 km northeast of Verkhneyarkeyevo (the district's administrative centre) by road. Telepanovo is the nearest rural locality.
