= Shidali, Republic of Bashkortostan =

Shidali Шидали
- Village
- Location within Bashkortostan Location within Russia
- Coordinates: 55°41′N 54°28′E
- Country: Russia
- Region: Bashkortostan
- District: Ilishevsky District
- Time zone: UTC+5:00

Shidali (Russian: Шидали; Bashkir: Шиҙәле, Şiźäle) is a rural locality (a village) in Andreyevsky Selsoviet, Ilishevsky District, Bashkortostan, Russia. The population was 48 as of 2010. There are 3 streets.

== Geography ==
Shidali is located 35 km north of Verkhneyarkeyevo (the district's administrative centre) by road. Marino is the nearest rural locality.
