= Ilyakshide =

Ilyakshide Илякшиде
- Village
- Location within Bashkortostan Location within Russia
- Coordinates: 55°17′N 54°35′E
- Country: Russia
- Region: Bashkortostan
- District: Ilishevsky District
- Time zone: UTC+5:00

Ilyakshide (Russian: Илякшиде; Bashkir: Иләкшиҙе, İläkşiźe) is a rural locality (a village) in Bishkurayevsky Selsoviet, Ilishevsky District, Bashkortostan, Russia. The population was 240 as of 2010. There are 2 streets.

== Geography ==
Ilyakshide is located 33 km southeast of Verkhneyarkeyevo (the district's administrative centre) by road. Bishkurayevo is the nearest rural locality.
