= Urnyakovo =

Urnyakovo Урняково
- Village
- Location within Bashkortostan Location within Russia
- Coordinates: 55°14′N 54°15′E
- Country: Russia
- Region: Bashkortostan
- District: Ilishevsky District
- Time zone: UTC+5:00

Urnyakovo (Russian: Урняково; Bashkir: Үрнәк, Ürnäk) is a rural locality (a village) in Dyumeyevsky Selsoviet, Ilishevsky District, Bashkortostan, Russia. The population was 119 as of 2010. There is 1 street.

== Geography ==
Urnyakovo is located 31 km south of Verkhneyarkeyevo (the district's administrative centre) by road. Taktagulovo is the nearest rural locality.
