= Gruzdevka =

Gruzdevka Груздевка
- Village
- Location within Bashkortostan Location within Russia
- Coordinates: 55°41′N 54°18′E
- Country: Russia
- Region: Bashkortostan
- District: Ilishevsky District
- Time zone: UTC+5:00

Gruzdevka (Russian: Груздевка) is a rural locality (a village) in Novomedvedevsky Selsoviet, Ilishevsky District, Bashkortostan, Russia. The population was 233 as of 2010. There are 4 streets.

== Geography ==
Gruzdevka is located 32 km north of Verkhneyarkeyevo (the district's administrative centre) by road. Novomedvedevo is the nearest rural locality.
