= Malotazeyevo =

Malotazeyevo Малотазеево
- Village
- Location within Bashkortostan Location within Russia
- Coordinates: 55°37′N 54°31′E
- Country: Russia
- Region: Bashkortostan
- District: Ilishevsky District
- Time zone: UTC+5:00

Malotazeyevo (Russian: Малотазеево; Bashkir: Кесе Тәжәй, Kese Täjäy) is a rural locality (a village) in Bazitamaksky Selsoviet, Ilishevsky District, Bashkortostan, Russia. The population was 46 as of 2010. There is 1 street.

== Geography ==
Malotazeyevo is located 36 km northeast of Verkhneyarkeyevo (the district's administrative centre) by road. Novonadyrovo is the nearest rural locality.
