= Nur, Chekmagushevsky District, Republic of Bashkortostan =

Nur Нур
- Village
- Location within Bashkortostan Location within Russia
- Coordinates: 55°03′N 54°49′E
- Country: Russia
- Region: Bashkortostan
- District: Chekmagushevsky District
- Time zone: UTC+5:00

Nur (Bashkir and Russian: Нур) is a rural locality (a village) in Chekmagushevsky District, Bashkortostan, Russia. The population was 68 as of 2010. There is 1 street.

== Geography ==
Nur is located 20 km southeast of Chekmagush (the district's administrative centre) by road. Urnyak is the nearest rural locality.
