= Novosemenkino, Chekmagushevsky District, Republic of Bashkortostan =

Novosemenkino Новосеменкино
- Selo
- Location within Bashkortostan Location within Russia
- Coordinates: 54°58′N 54°26′E
- Country: Russia
- Region: Bashkortostan
- District: Chekmagushevsky District
- Time zone: UTC+5:00

Novosemenkino (Russian: Новосеменкино) is a rural locality (a selo) in Chekmagushevsky District, Bashkortostan, Russia. The population was 207 as of 2010. There are 4 streets.

== Geography ==
Novosemenkino is located 32 km southwest of Chekmagush (the district's administrative centre) by road. Uybulatovo is the nearest rural locality.
