= Novomedvedevo =

Novomedvedevo Новомедведево
- Village
- Location within Bashkortostan Location within Russia
- Coordinates: 55°41′N 54°17′E
- Country: Russia
- Region: Bashkortostan
- District: Ilishevsky District
- Time zone: UTC+5:00

Novomedvedevo (Russian: Новомедведево; Bashkir: Яңы Айыу, Yañı Ayıw) is a rural locality (a village) and the administrative centre of Novomedvedevsky Selsoviet, Ilishevsky District, Bashkortostan, Russia. The population was 259 as of 2010. There are 4 streets.

== Geography ==
Novomedvedevo is located 34 km north of Verkhneyarkeyevo (the district's administrative centre) by road. Starokirgizovo is the nearest rural locality.
