= Starobalakovo =

Starobalakovo Старобалаково
- Selo
- Location within Bashkortostan Location within Russia
- Coordinates: 55°10′N 54°21′E
- Country: Russia
- Region: Bashkortostan
- District: Chekmagushevsky District
- Time zone: UTC+5:00

Starobalakovo (Russian: Старобалаково; Bashkir: Иҫке Балаҡ, İśke Balaq) is a rural locality (a selo) in Chekmagushevsky District, Bashkortostan, Russia. The population was 218 as of 2010. There are 3 streets.

== Geography ==
Starobalakovo is located 25 km northwest of Chekmagush (the district's administrative centre) by road. Taynyashevo is the nearest rural locality.
