= Resmekeyevo =

Resmekeyevo Ресмекеево
- Village
- Location within Bashkortostan Location within Russia
- Coordinates: 55°05′N 54°42′E
- Country: Russia
- Region: Bashkortostan
- District: Chekmagushevsky District
- Time zone: UTC+5:00

Resmekeyevo (Russian: Ресмекеево; Bashkir: Рәсмәкәй, Räsmäkäy) is a rural locality (a village) in Chekmagushevsky District, Bashkortostan, Russia. The population was 95 as of 2010. There is 1 street.

== Geography ==
Resmekeyevo is located 7 km southeast of Chekmagush (the district's administrative centre) by road. Novoresmekeyevo is the nearest rural locality.
