= Ulu-Yalan =

Ulu-Yalan Улу-Ялан
- Village
- Location within Bashkortostan Location within Russia
- Coordinates: 55°30′N 54°09′E
- Country: Russia
- Region: Bashkortostan
- District: Ilishevsky District
- Time zone: UTC+5:00

Ulu-Yalan (Russian: Улу-Ялан; Bashkir: Олоялан, Oloyalan) is a rural locality (a village) in Isanbayevsky Selsoviet, Ilishevsky District, Bashkortostan, Russia. The population was 88 as of 2010. There are 2 streets.

== Geography ==
Ulu-Yalan is located 23 km northwest of Verkhneyarkeyevo (the district's administrative centre) by road. Isanbayevo is the nearest rural locality.
