= Yunny =

Yunny Юнны
- Selo
- Location within Bashkortostan Location within Russia
- Coordinates: 55°24′N 54°19′E
- Country: Russia
- Region: Bashkortostan
- District: Ilishevsky District
- Time zone: UTC+5:00

Yunny (Russian: Юнны; Bashkir: Йөннө, Yönnö) is a rural locality (a selo) in Yunnovsky Selsoviet, Ilishevsky District, Bashkortostan, Russia. The population was 814 as of 2010. There are 9 streets.

== Geography ==
Yunny is located 7 km south of Verkhneyarkeyevo (the district's administrative centre) by road. Verkhneyarkeyevo is the nearest rural locality.
