= Novosurmetovo =

Novosurmetovo Новосурметово
- Village
- Location within Bashkortostan Location within Russia
- Coordinates: 55°02′N 54°14′E
- Country: Russia
- Region: Bashkortostan
- District: Chekmagushevsky District
- Time zone: UTC+5:00

Novosurmetovo (Russian: Новосурметово; Bashkir: Яңы Сөрмәт, Yañı Sörmät) is a rural locality (a village) in Chekmagushevsky District, Bashkortostan, Russia. The population was 7 as of 2010. There is 1 street.

== Geography ==
Novosurmetovo is located 31 km southwest of Chekmagush (the district's administrative centre) by road. Yana Birde is the nearest rural locality.
