= Verkhniye Karyavdy =

Verkhniye Karyavdy Верхние Карьявды
- Selo
- Location within Bashkortostan Location within Russia
- Coordinates: 55°03′N 54°24′E
- Country: Russia
- Region: Bashkortostan
- District: Chekmagushevsky District
- Time zone: UTC+5:00

Verkhniye Karyavdy (Russian: Верхние Карьявды; Bashkir: Үрге Ҡаръяуҙы, Ürge Qaryawźı) is a rural locality (a selo) in Chekmagushevsky District, Bashkortostan, Russia. The population was 34 as of 2010. There is 1 street.

== Geography ==
Verkhniye Karyavdy is located 23 km southwest of Chekmagush (the district's administrative centre) by road. Nizhniye Karyavdy is the nearest rural locality.
