= Kashkarovo, Chekmagushevsky District, Republic of Bashkortostan =

Kashkarovo Кашкарово
- Selo
- Location within Bashkortostan Location within Russia
- Coordinates: 54°58′N 54°33′E
- Country: Russia
- Region: Bashkortostan
- District: Chekmagushevsky District
- Time zone: UTC+5:00

Kashkarovo (Russian: Кашкарово; Bashkir: Ҡашҡар, Qaşqar) is a rural locality (a selo) in Chekmagushevsky District, Bashkortostan, Russia. The population was 133 as of 2010. There are 2 streets.

== Geography ==
Kashkarovo is located 23 km south of Chekmagush (the district's administrative centre) by road. Kalmashbashevo is the nearest rural locality.
