= Syultino =

Syultino Сюльтино
- Selo
- Location within Bashkortostan Location within Russia
- Coordinates: 55°17′N 54°24′E
- Country: Russia
- Region: Bashkortostan
- District: Ilishevsky District
- Time zone: UTC+5:00

Syultino (Russian: Сюльтино; Bashkir: Сүлте, Sülte) is a rural locality (a selo) and the administrative centre of Syultinsky Selsoviet, Ilishevsky District, Bashkortostan, Russia. The population was 339 as of 2010. There are 5 streets.

== Geography ==
Syultino is located 22 km southeast of Verkhneyarkeyevo (the district's administrative centre) by road. Yantuganovo is the nearest rural locality.
