= Yana Birde =

Yana Birde Яна Бирде
- Selo
- Location within Bashkortostan Location within Russia
- Coordinates: 55°03′N 54°16′E
- Country: Russia
- Region: Bashkortostan
- District: Chekmagushevsky District
- Time zone: UTC+5:00

Yana Birde (Russian: Яна Бирде; Bashkir: Яңыбирҙе, Yañıbirźe) is a rural locality (selo) in Chekmagushevsky District, Bashkortostan, Russia. The population was 324 as of 2010. There are 2 streets.

== Geography ==
Yana Birde is located 27 km southwest of Chekmagush (the district's administrative centre) by road. Starosurmetovo is the nearest rural locality.
