= Novaya Murtaza =

Novaya Murtaza Новая Муртаза
- Selo
- Location within Bashkortostan Location within Russia
- Coordinates: 55°10′N 54°55′E
- Country: Russia
- Region: Bashkortostan
- District: Chekmagushevsky District
- Time zone: UTC+5:00

Novaya Murtaza (Russian: Новая Муртаза; Bashkir: Яңы Мортаза, Yañı Mortaza) is a rural locality (a selo) in Chekmagushevsky District, Bashkortostan, Russia. The population was 164 as of 2010. There are 2 streets.

== Geography ==
Novaya Murtaza is located 22 km northeast of Chekmagush (the district's administrative centre) by road. Ilikovo is the nearest rural locality.
