= Krasny Oktyabr, Ilishevsky District, Republic of Bashkortostan =

Krasny Oktyabr Красный Октябрь
- Village
- Location within Bashkortostan Location within Russia
- Coordinates: 55°31′N 54°15′E
- Country: Russia
- Region: Bashkortostan
- District: Ilishevsky District
- Time zone: UTC+5:00

Krasny Oktyabr (Russian: Красный Октябрь) is a rural locality (a village) in Starokuktovsky Selsoviet, Ilishevsky District, Bashkortostan, Russia. The population was 154 as of 2010. There are 2 streets.

== Geography ==
Krasny Oktyabr is located 15 km north of Verkhneyarkeyevo (the district's administrative centre) by road. Ibragim is the nearest rural locality.
