= Urmetovo =

Urmetovo Урметово
- Selo
- Location within Bashkortostan Location within Russia
- Coordinates: 55°19′N 54°14′E
- Country: Russia
- Region: Bashkortostan
- District: Ilishevsky District
- Time zone: UTC+5:00

Urmetovo (Russian: Урметово; Bashkir: Үрмәт, Ürmät) is a rural locality (a selo) and the administrative centre of Urmetovsky Selsoviet, Ilishevsky District, Bashkortostan, Russia. The population was 654 as of 2010. There are 6 streets.

== Geography ==
Urmetovo is located 21 km southwest of Verkhneyarkeyevo (the district's administrative centre) by road. Rsayevo is the nearest rural locality.
