= Malo-Bishkurayevo =

Malo-Bishkurayevo Мало-Бишкураево
- Village
- Location within Bashkortostan Location within Russia
- Coordinates: 55°19′N 54°33′E
- Country: Russia
- Region: Bashkortostan
- District: Ilishevsky District
- Time zone: UTC+5:00

Malo-Bishkurayevo (Russian: Мало-Бишкураево; Bashkir: Кесе Бишҡурай, Kese Bişquray) is a rural locality (a village) in Bishkurayevsky Selsoviet, Ilishevsky District, Bashkortostan, Russia. The population was 169 as of 2010. There are 3 streets.

== Geography ==
Malo-Bishkurayevo is located 30 km southeast of Verkhneyarkeyevo (the district's administrative centre) by road. Tyuliganovo is the nearest rural locality.
