= Starokalmashevo =

Starokalmashevo Старокалмашево
- Selo
- Location within Bashkortostan Location within Russia
- Coordinates: 55°07′N 54°50′E
- Country: Russia
- Region: Bashkortostan
- District: Chekmagushevsky District
- Time zone: UTC+5:00

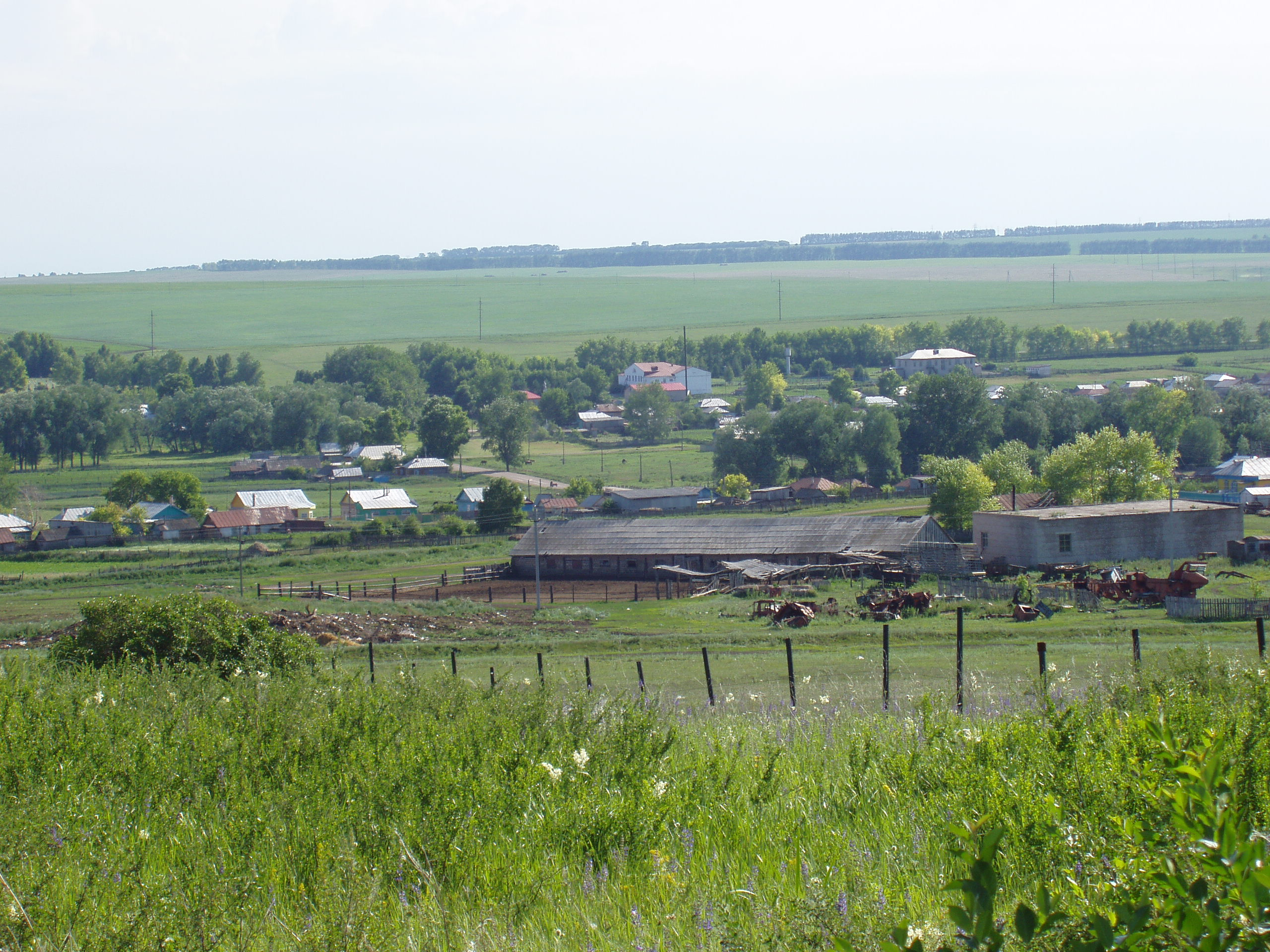
View of Starokalmashevo from the Muslim cemetery

Starokalmashevo (Russian: Старокалмашево; Bashkir: Иҫке Ҡалмаш, İśke Qalmaş) is a rural locality (a selo) and the administrative centre of Starokalmashevsky Selsoviet, Chekmagushevsky District, Bashkortostan, Russia. The population was 1,849 as of 2010. There are 19 streets.

== Geography ==
Starokalmashevo is located 15 km east of Chekmagush (the district's administrative centre) by road. Bulgar is the nearest rural locality.
