= Yumashevo, Chekmagushevsky District, Republic of Bashkortostan =

Yumashevo Юмашево
- Selo
- Location within Bashkortostan Location within Russia
- Coordinates: 54°59′N 54°24′E
- Country: Russia
- Region: Bashkortostan
- District: Chekmagushevsky District
- Time zone: UTC+5:00

Yumashevo (Russian: Юмашево; Bashkir: Йомаш, Yomaş) is a rural locality (a selo) and the administrative centre of Yumashevsky Selsoviet, Chekmagushevsky District, Bashkortostan, Russia. The population was 865 as of 2010. There are 8 streets.

== Geography ==
Yumashevo is located 30 km southwest of Chekmagush (the district's administrative centre) by road. Novosemenkino is the nearest rural locality.
