= Novokalmashevo =

Novokalmashevo Новокалмашево
- Selo
- Location within Bashkortostan Location within Russia
- Coordinates: 55°07′N 55°02′E
- Country: Russia
- Region: Bashkortostan
- District: Chekmagushevsky District
- Time zone: UTC+5:00

Novokalmashevo (Russian: Новокалмашево; Bashkir: Яңы Ҡалмаш, Yañı Qalmaş) is a rural locality (a selo) in Chekmagushevsky District, Bashkortostan, Russia. The population was 143 as of 2010. There are 3 streets.

== Geography ==
Novokalmashevo is located 32 km east of Chekmagush (the district's administrative centre) by road. Novoyumranovo is the nearest rural locality.
