= Kalmashbashevo =

Kalmashbashevo Калмашбашево
- Selo
- Location within Bashkortostan Location within Russia
- Coordinates: 55°00′N 54°36′E
- Country: Russia
- Region: Bashkortostan
- District: Chekmagushevsky District
- Time zone: UTC+5:00

Kalmashbashevo (Russian: Калмашбашево; Bashkir: Ҡалмашбаш, Qalmaşbaş) is a rural locality (a selo) and the administrative centre of Kalmashbashevsky Selsoviet, Chekmagushevsky District, Bashkortostan, Russia. The population was 774 as of 2010. There are 4 streets.

== Geography ==
Kalmashbashevo is located 18 km south of Chekmagush (the district's administrative centre) by road. Starobikkino is the nearest rural locality.
