= Uybulatovo =

Uybulatovo Уйбулатово
- Selo
- Location within Bashkortostan Location within Russia
- Coordinates: 54°57′N 54°25′E
- Country: Russia
- Region: Bashkortostan
- District: Chekmagushevsky District
- Time zone: UTC+5:00

Uybulatovo (Russian: Уйбулатово; Bashkir: Уйбулат, Uybulat) is a rural locality (a selo) in Chekmagushevsky District, Bashkortostan, Russia. The population was 262 in 2010. There are two streets.

== Geography ==
Uybulatovo is located 34 kilometres (21 mi) southwest of Chekmagush (the district's administrative centre) by road. Yumashevo is the nearest rural locality.
