= Novotaynyashevo =

Novotaynyashevo Новотайняшево
- Village
- Location within Bashkortostan Location within Russia
- Coordinates: 55°06′N 54°10′E
- Country: Russia
- Region: Bashkortostan
- District: Chekmagushevsky District
- Time zone: UTC+5:00

Novotaynyashevo (Russian: Новотайняшево; Bashkir: Яңы Тайнаш, Yañı Taynaş) is a rural locality (a village) in Chekmagushevsky District, Bashkortostan, Russia. The population was 19 as of 2010. There is 1 street.

== Geography ==
Novotaynyashevo is located 38 km west of Chekmagush (the district's administrative centre) by road. Starogusevo and Novogusevo are the nearest rural localities.
