= Tamyanovo =

Tamyanovo Тамьяново
- Selo
- Location within Bashkortostan Location within Russia
- Coordinates: 55°14′N 54°32′E
- Country: Russia
- Region: Bashkortostan
- District: Chekmagushevsky District
- Time zone: UTC+5:00

Tamyanovo (Russian: Тамьяново; Bashkir: Тамъян, Tamyan) is a rural locality (a selo) in Chekmagushevsky District, Bashkortostan, Russia. The population was 268 as of 2010. There are 5 streets.

== Geography ==
Tamyanovo is located 14 km northwest of Chekmagush (the district's administrative centre) by road. Novokutovo is the nearest rural locality.
