= Uyandykovo =

Uyandykovo Уяндыково
- Village
- Location within Bashkortostan Location within Russia
- Coordinates: 55°41′N 54°21′E
- Country: Russia
- Region: Bashkortostan
- District: Ilishevsky District
- Time zone: UTC+5:00

Uyandykovo (Russian: Уяндыково; Bashkir: Уяндыҡ, Uyandıq) is a rural locality (a village) in Novomedvedevsky Selsoviet, Ilishevsky District, Bashkortostan, Russia. The population was 182 as of 2010. There are 3 streets.

== Geography ==
Uyandykovo is located 31 km north of Verkhneyarkeyevo (the district's administrative centre) by road. Andreyevka is the nearest rural locality.
