= Tashkichi =

Tashkichi Ташкичи
- Village
- Location within Bashkortostan Location within Russia
- Coordinates: 55°36′N 54°28′E
- Country: Russia
- Region: Bashkortostan
- District: Ilishevsky District
- Time zone: UTC+5:00

Tashkichi (Russian: Ташкичи; Bashkir: Ташкисеү, Taşkisew) is a rural locality (a village) in Bazitamaksky Selsoviet, Ilishevsky District, Bashkortostan, Russia. The population was 217 as of 2010. There are 2 streets.

== Geography ==
Tashkichi is located 39 km northeast of Verkhneyarkeyevo (the district's administrative centre) by road. Tatarsky Meneuz is the nearest rural locality.
