= Tukay-Tamak =

Tukay-Tamak Тукай-Тамак
- Village
- Location within Bashkortostan Location within Russia
- Coordinates: 55°24′N 53°54′E
- Country: Russia
- Region: Bashkortostan
- District: Ilishevsky District
- Time zone: UTC+5:00

Tukay-Tamak (Russian: Тукай-Тамак; Bashkir: Туҡайтамаҡ, Tuqaytamaq) is a rural locality (a village) in Isametovsky Selsoviet, Ilishevsky District, Bashkortostan, Russia. The population was 100 as of 2010. There are 2 streets.

== Geography ==
Tukay-Tamak is located 30 km west of Verkhneyarkeyevo (the district's administrative centre) by road. Churakayevo is the nearest rural locality.
