= Verkhny Atash =

Verkhny Atash Верхний Аташ
- Selo
- Location within Bashkortostan Location within Russia
- Coordinates: 55°19′N 54°41′E
- Country: Russia
- Region: Bashkortostan
- District: Chekmagushevsky District
- Time zone: UTC+5:00

Verkhny Atash (Russian: Верхний Аташ; Bashkir: Үрге Аташ, Ürge Ataş) is a rural locality (a selo) in Chekmagushevsky District, Bashkortostan, Russia. The population was 474 as of 2010. There are 11 streets.

== Geography ==
Verkhny Atash is located 26 km north of Chekmagush (the district's administrative centre) by road. Nizhneatashevo is the nearest rural locality.
