= Bazitamak =

Bazitamak Базитамак
- Selo
- Location within Bashkortostan Location within Russia
- Coordinates: 55°38′N 54°32′E
- Country: Russia
- Region: Bashkortostan
- District: Ilishevsky District
- Time zone: UTC+5:00

Bazitamak (Russian: Базитамак; Bashkir: Баҙытамаҡ, Baźıtamaq) is a rural locality (a selo) and the administrative centre of Bazitamaksky Selsoviet, Ilishevsky District, Bashkortostan, Russia. The population was 666 as of 2010. There are 5 streets.

== Geography ==
Bazitamak is located 40 km northeast of Verkhneyarkeyevo (the district's administrative centre) by road. Staronadyrovo is the nearest rural locality.
