= Shammetovo =

Shammetovo Шамметово
- Village
- Location within Bashkortostan Location within Russia
- Coordinates: 55°35′N 54°07′E
- Country: Russia
- Region: Bashkortostan
- District: Ilishevsky District
- Time zone: UTC+5:00

Shammetovo (Russian: Шамметово; Bashkir: Шәммәт, Şämmät) is a rural locality (a village) in Akkuzevsky Selsoviet, Ilishevsky District, Bashkortostan, Russia. The population was 236 as of 2010. There are 5 streets.

== Geography ==
Shammetovo is located 26 km northwest of Verkhneyarkeyevo (the district's administrative centre) by road. Kipchakovo is the nearest rural locality.
