= Novobashirovo =

Novobashirovo Новобаширово
- Village
- Location within Bashkortostan Location within Russia
- Coordinates: 55°05′N 55°01′E
- Country: Russia
- Region: Bashkortostan
- District: Chekmagushevsky District
- Time zone: UTC+5:00

Novobashirovo (Russian: Новобаширово; Bashkir: Яңы Бәшир, Yañı Bäşir) is a rural locality (a village) in Chekmagushevsky District, Bashkortostan, Russia. The population was 26 as of 2010. There is 1 street.

== Geography ==
Novobashirovo is located 29 km east of Chekmagush (the district's administrative centre) by road. Starobashirovo is the nearest rural locality.
