= Nizhniye Karyavdy =

Nizhniye Karyavdy Нижние Карьявды
- Selo
- Location within Bashkortostan Location within Russia
- Coordinates: 55°03′N 54°25′E
- Country: Russia
- Region: Bashkortostan
- District: Chekmagushevsky District
- Time zone: UTC+5:00

Nizhniye Karyavdy (Russian: Нижние Карьявды; Bashkir: Түбәнге Ҡаръяуҙы, Tübänge Qaryawźı) is a rural locality (a selo) in Chekmagushevsky District, Bashkortostan, Russia. The population was 141 as of 2010. There are 2 streets.

== Geography ==
Nizhniye Karyavdy is located 22 km southwest of Chekmagush (the district's administrative centre) by road. Verkhniye Karyavdy is the nearest rural locality.
