= Baza-Kuyanovo =

Baza-Kuyanovo База-Куяново
- Village
- Location within Bashkortostan Location within Russia
- Coordinates: 55°16′N 54°19′E
- Country: Russia
- Region: Bashkortostan
- District: Ilishevsky District
- Time zone: UTC+5:00

Baza-Kuyanovo (Russian: База-Куяново; Bashkir: Баҙы-Ҡуян, Baźı-Quyan) is a rural locality (a village) in Dyumeyevsky Selsoviet, Ilishevsky District, Bashkortostan, Russia. The population was 122 as of 2010. There is 1 street.

== Geography ==
Baza-Kuyanovo is located 27 km south of Verkhneyarkeyevo (the district's administrative centre) by road. Dyumeyevo is the nearest rural locality.
