= Novokuktovo =

Novokuktovo Новокуктово
- Village
- Location within Bashkortostan Location within Russia
- Coordinates: 55°24′N 54°13′E
- Country: Russia
- Region: Bashkortostan
- District: Ilishevsky District
- Time zone: UTC+5:00

Novokuktovo (Russian: Новокуктово; Bashkir: Яңы Күктау, Yañı Küktaw) is a rural locality (a village) in Karabashevsky Selsoviet, Ilishevsky District, Bashkortostan, Russia. The population was 316 as of 2010. There are 4 streets.

== Geography ==
Novokuktovo is located 8 km southwest of Verkhneyarkeyevo (the district's administrative centre) by road. Karabashevo is the nearest rural locality.
