= Kayenlyk =

Kayenlyk Каенлык
- Village
- Location within Bashkortostan Location within Russia
- Coordinates: 55°26′N 54°25′E
- Country: Russia
- Region: Bashkortostan
- District: Ilishevsky District
- Time zone: UTC+5:00

Kayenlyk (Russian: Каенлык; Bashkir: Ҡайынлыҡ, Qayınlıq) is a rural locality (a village) in Yunnovsky Selsoviet, Ilishevsky District, Bashkortostan, Russia. The population was 80 as of 2010. There are 3 streets.

== Geography ==
Kayenlyk is located 9 km east of Verkhneyarkeyevo (the district's administrative centre) by road. Irmashevo is the nearest rural locality.
