= Novoresmekeyevo =

Novoresmekeyevo Новоресмекеево
- Village
- Location within Bashkortostan Location within Russia
- Coordinates: 55°05′N 54°41′E
- Country: Russia
- Region: Bashkortostan
- District: Chekmagushevsky District
- Time zone: UTC+5:00

Novoresmekeyevo (Russian: Новоресмекеево; Bashkir: Яңы Рәсмәкәй, Yañı Räsmäkäy) is a rural locality (a village) in Chekmagushevsky District, Bashkortostan, Russia. The population was 4 as of 2010. There is only 1 street.

== Geography ==
Novoresmekeyevo is situated 8 km southeast of Chekmagush (the district's administrative centre) by road. Resmekeyevo is the nearest rural locality.
