= Tukayevo, Chekmagushevsky District, Republic of Bashkortostan =

Tukayevo Тукаево
- Village
- Location within Bashkortostan Location within Russia
- Coordinates: 55°08′N 54°29′E
- Country: Russia
- Region: Bashkortostan
- District: Chekmagushevsky District
- Time zone: UTC+5:00

Tukayevo (Russian: Тукаево; Bashkir: Туҡай, Tuqay) is a rural locality (a village) in Chekmagushevsky District, Bashkortostan, Russia. The population was 80 as of 2010. There are 2 streets.

== Geography ==
Tukayevo is located 11 km west of Chekmagush (the district's administrative centre) by road. Nikolayevka is the nearest rural locality.
