= Kyzyl-Yulduz, Ilishevsky District, Republic of Bashkortostan =

Kyzyl-Yulduz Кызыл-Юлдуз
- Village
- Location within Bashkortostan Location within Russia
- Coordinates: 55°38′N 54°35′E
- Country: Russia
- Region: Bashkortostan
- District: Ilishevsky District
- Time zone: UTC+5:00

Kyzyl-Yulduz (Russian: Кызыл-Юлдуз; Bashkir: Ҡыҙыл Йондоҙ, Qıźıl Yondoź) is a rural locality (a village) in Bazitamaksky Selsoviet, Ilishevsky District, Bashkortostan, Russia. The population was 85 as of 2010. There are 2 streets.

== Geography ==
Kyzyl-Yulduz is located 40 km northeast of Verkhneyarkeyevo (the district's administrative centre) by road. Vostok is the nearest rural locality.
