= Yash-Kuch =

Yash-Kuch Яш-Куч
- Village
- Location within Bashkortostan Location within Russia
- Coordinates: 55°00′N 54°48′E
- Country: Russia
- Region: Bashkortostan
- District: Chekmagushevsky District
- Time zone: UTC+5:00

Yash-Kuch (Russian: Яш-Куч; Bashkir: Йәш Көс, Yäş Kös) is a rural locality (a village) in Chekmagushevsky District, Bashkortostan, Russia. The population was 19 as of 2010. There is 1 street.

== Geography ==
Yash-Kuch is located 19 km southeast of Chekmagush (the district's administrative centre) by road. Urnyak is the nearest rural locality.
