= Mitro-Ayupovskoye =

Mitro-Ayupovskoye Митро-Аюповское
- Selo
- Location within Bashkortostan Location within Russia
- Coordinates: 55°00′N 54°27′E
- Country: Russia
- Region: Bashkortostan
- District: Chekmagushevsky District
- Time zone: UTC+5:00

Mitro-Ayupovskoye (Russian: Митро-Аюповское; Bashkir: Митрәй-Әйүп, Miträy-Äyüp) is a rural locality (a selo) in Chekmagushevsky District, Bashkortostan, Russia. The population was 457 as of 2010. There are 2 streets.

== Geography ==
Mitro-Ayupovskoye is located 29 km southwest of Chekmagush (the district's administrative centre) by road. Staropuchkakovo is the nearest rural locality.
