= Urnyak, Chekmagushevsky District, Republic of Bashkortostan =

Urnyak Урняк
- Selo
- Location within Bashkortostan Location within Russia
- Coordinates: 55°02′N 54°45′E
- Country: Russia
- Region: Bashkortostan
- District: Chekmagushevsky District
- Time zone: UTC+5:00

Urnyak (Russian: Урняк; Bashkir: Үрнәк, Ürnäk) is a rural locality (a selo) and the administrative centre of Urnyaksky Selsoviet, Chekmagushevsky District, Bashkortostan, Russia. The population was 665 as of 2010. There are 10 streets.

== Geography ==
Urnyak is located 15 km southeast of Chekmagush (the district's administrative centre) by road. Nur is the nearest rural locality.
