= Karan, Chekmagushevsky District, Republic of Bashkortostan =

Karan Каран
- Selo
- Location within Bashkortostan Location within Russia
- Coordinates: 55°07′N 54°22′E
- Country: Russia
- Region: Bashkortostan
- District: Chekmagushevsky District
- Time zone: UTC+5:00

Karan (Russian: Каран; Bashkir: Ҡаран, Qaran) is a rural locality (a selo) in Chekmagushevsky District, Bashkortostan, Russia. The population was 167 as of 2010. There is 1 street.

== Geography ==
Karan is located 21 km west of Chekmagush (the district's administrative centre) by road. Novobaltachevo is the nearest rural locality.
