= Rezyapovo =

Rezyapovo Резяпово
- Selo
- Location within Bashkortostan Location within Russia
- Coordinates: 55°05′N 54°17′E
- Country: Russia
- Region: Bashkortostan
- District: Chekmagushevsky District
- Time zone: UTC+5:00

Rezyapovo (Russian: Резяпово; Bashkir: Рәжәп, Räjäp) is a rural locality (a selo) in Chekmagushevsky District, Bashkortostan, Russia. The population was 532 as of 2010. There are 7 streets.

== Geography ==
Rezyapovo is located 26 km southwest of Chekmagush (the district's administrative centre) by road. Baybulatovo is the nearest rural locality.
