= Buraly =

Buraly Буралы
- Village
- Location within Bashkortostan Location within Russia
- Coordinates: 55°32′N 54°23′E
- Country: Russia
- Region: Bashkortostan
- District: Ilishevsky District
- Time zone: UTC+5:00

Buraly (Russian: Буралы; Bashkir: Буралы, Buralı) is a rural locality (a village) in Iteyevsky Selsoviet, Ilishevsky District, Bashkortostan, Russia. The population was 235 as of 2010. There are 2 streets.

== Geography ==
Buraly is located 12 km northeast of Verkhneyarkeyevo (the district's administrative centre) by road. Iteyevo is the nearest rural locality.
