= Ilishevo =

Ilishevo Илишево
- Village
- Location within Bashkortostan Location within Russia
- Coordinates: 55°37′N 54°11′E
- Country: Russia
- Region: Bashkortostan
- District: Ilishevsky District
- Time zone: UTC+5:00

Ilishevo (Russian: Илишево; Bashkir: Илеш, İleş) is a rural locality (a village) in Yabalakovsky Selsoviet, Ilishevsky District, Bashkortostan, Russia. The population was 409 as of 2010. There are 4 streets.

== Geography ==
Ilishevo is located 30 km northwest of Verkhneyarkeyevo (the district's administrative centre) by road. Yabalakovo is the nearest rural locality.
