= Rapatovo =

Rapatovo Рапатово
- Selo
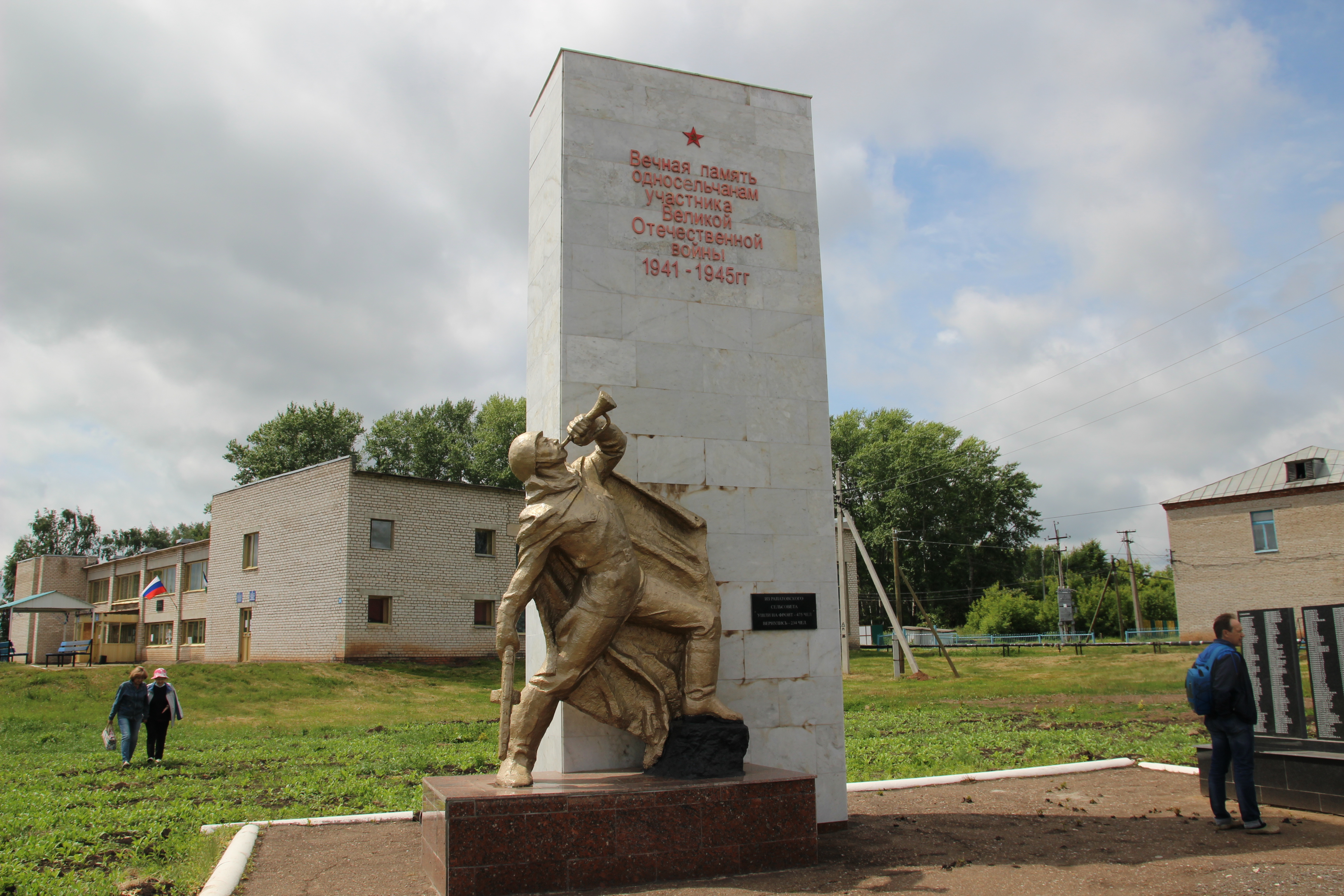
- WWII memorial in Rapatovo

- Location within Bashkortostan Location within Russia
- Coordinates: 55°03′N 54°36′E
- Country: Russia
- Region: Bashkortostan
- District: Chekmagushevsky District
- Time zone: UTC+5:00

Rapatovo (Russian: Рапатово; Bashkir: Рапат, romanized: Rapat) is a rural locality (a selo) and the administrative centre of Rapatovsky Selsoviet, Chekmagushevsky District, Bashkortostan, Russia. The population was 830 as of 2010. There are 8 streets.

== Geography ==
Rapatovo is located 11 km south of Chekmagush (the district's administrative centre) by road. Starobikkino is the nearest rural locality.
