= Kashakovo =

Kashakovo Кашаково
- Village
- Location within Bashkortostan Location within Russia
- Coordinates: 55°11′N 54°44′E
- Country: Russia
- Region: Bashkortostan
- District: Chekmagushevsky District
- Time zone: UTC+5:00

Kashakovo (Russian: Кашаково; Bashkir: Кәшәк, Käşäk) is a rural locality (a village) in Chekmagushevsky District, Bashkortostan, Russia. The population was 124 as of 2010. There are 2 streets.

== Geography ==
Kashakovo is located 10 km northeast of Chekmagush (the district's administrative centre) by road. Syryshbashevo is the nearest rural locality.
