= Kalinino, Ilishevsky District, Republic of Bashkortostan =

Kalinino Калинино
- Village
- Location within Bashkortostan Location within Russia
- Coordinates: 55°31′N 54°06′E
- Country: Russia
- Region: Bashkortostan
- District: Ilishevsky District
- Time zone: UTC+5:00

Kalinino (Russian: Калинино) is a rural locality (a village) in Akkuzevsky Selsoviet, Ilishevsky District, Bashkortostan, Russia. The population was 38 as of 2010. There is 1 street.

== Geography ==
Kalinino is located 28 km northwest of Verkhneyarkeyevo (the district's administrative centre) by road. Akkuzevo is the nearest rural locality.
