= Tyuliganovo =

Tyuliganovo Тюлиганово
- Village
- Location within Bashkortostan Location within Russia
- Coordinates: 55°18′N 54°34′E
- Country: Russia
- Region: Bashkortostan
- District: Ilishevsky District
- Time zone: UTC+5:00

Tyuliganovo (Russian: Тюлиганово; Bashkir: Түләгөн, Tülägön) is a rural locality (a village) in Bishkurayevsky Selsoviet, Ilishevsky District, Bashkortostan, Russia. The population was 178 as of 2010. There are 3 streets.

== Geography ==
Tyuliganovo is located 31 km southeast of Verkhneyarkeyevo (the district's administrative centre) by road. Malo-Bishkurayevo is the nearest rural locality.
