= Bulyakovo =

Bulyakovo Буляково
- Village
- Location within Bashkortostan Location within Russia
- Coordinates: 55°07′N 54°17′E
- Country: Russia
- Region: Bashkortostan
- District: Chekmagushevsky District
- Time zone: UTC+5:00

Bulyakovo (Russian: Буляково; Bashkir: Бүләк, Büläk) is a rural locality (a village) in Chekmagushevsky District, Bashkortostan, Russia. The population was 20 as of 2010. There is 1 street.

== Geography ==
Bulyakovo is located 29 km west of Chekmagush (the district's administrative centre) by road. Novobalakovo is the nearest rural locality.
