= Knyaz-Yelga =

Knyaz-Yelga Князь-Елга
- Village
- Location within Bashkortostan Location within Russia
- Coordinates: 55°36′N 54°09′E
- Country: Russia
- Region: Bashkortostan
- District: Ilishevsky District
- Time zone: UTC+5:00

Knyaz-Yelga (Russian: Князь-Елга; Bashkir: Кенәзйылға, Kenäzyılğa) is a rural locality (a village) in Akkuzevsky Selsoviet, Ilishevsky District, Bashkortostan, Russia. The population was 59 as of 2010. There are 3 streets.

== Geography ==
Knyaz-Yelga is located 28 km northwest of Verkhneyarkeyevo (the district's administrative centre) by road. Shammetovo is the nearest rural locality.
