= Imyanlikulevo =

Imyanlikulevo Имянликулево
- Selo
- Location within Bashkortostan Location within Russia
- Coordinates: 55°17′N 54°39′E
- Country: Russia
- Region: Bashkortostan
- District: Chekmagushevsky District
- Time zone: UTC+5:00

Imyanlikulevo (Russian: Имянликулево; Bashkir: Имәнлеҡул, İmänlequl) is a rural locality (a selo) in Chekmagushevsky District, Bashkortostan, Russia. The population was 761 as of 2010. There are 15 streets.

== Geography ==
Imyanlikulevo is located 20 km north of Chekmagush (the district's administrative centre) by road. Zemeyevo is the nearest rural locality.
