= Ishkarovo =

Ishkarovo Ишкарово
- Selo
- Location within Bashkortostan Location within Russia
- Coordinates: 55°28′N 54°31′E
- Country: Russia
- Region: Bashkortostan
- District: Ilishevsky District
- Time zone: UTC+5:00

Ishkarovo (Russian: Ишкарово; Bashkir: Ишҡар, İşqar) is a rural locality (a selo) and the administrative centre of Ishkarovsky Selsoviet, Ilishevsky District, Bashkortostan, Russia. The population was 576 as of 2010. There are 6 streets.

== Geography ==
Ishkarovo is located 17 km east of Verkhneyarkeyevo (the district's administrative centre) by road. Saitkulovo is the nearest rural locality.
