= Novokarazirikovo =

Novokarazirikovo Новокаразириково
- Village
- Location within Bashkortostan Location within Russia
- Coordinates: 55.32017°N 54.81617°E
- Country: Russia
- Region: Bashkortostan
- District: Chekmagushevsky District
- Time zone: UTC+5:00

Novokarazirikovo (Russian: Новокаразириково; Bashkir: Яңы Ҡарайерек, Yañı Qarayerek) is a rural locality (a village) in Chekmagushevsky District, Bashkortostan, Russia. The population was 1 as of 2010. There is 1 street.

== Geography ==
Novokarazirikovo is located 27 km north of Chekmagush (the district's administrative centre) by road. Karazirikovo is the nearest rural locality.
