= Starotatyshevo =

Starotatyshevo Старотатышево
- Selo
- Location within Bashkortostan Location within Russia
- Coordinates: 55°44′N 54°12′E
- Country: Russia
- Region: Bashkortostan
- District: Ilishevsky District
- Time zone: UTC+5:00

Starotatyshevo (Russian: Старотатышево; Bashkir: Иҫке Татыш, İśke Tatış) is a rural locality (a selo) in Yabalakovsky Selsoviet, Ilishevsky District, Bashkortostan, Russia. The population was 451 as of 2010. There are 5 streets.

== Geography ==
Starotatyshevo is located 44 km north of Verkhneyarkeyevo (the district's administrative centre) by road. Chuganak is the nearest rural locality.
