= Karazirikovo, Chekmagushevsky District, Republic of Bashkortostan =

Karazirikovo Каразириково
- Selo
- Location within Bashkortostan Location within Russia
- Coordinates: 55°17′N 54°48′E
- Country: Russia
- Region: Bashkortostan
- District: Chekmagushevsky District
- Time zone: UTC+5:00

Karazirikovo (Russian: Каразириково; Bashkir: Ҡарайерек, Qarayerek) is a rural locality (a selo) in Chekmagushevsky District, Bashkortostan, Russia. The population was 405 as of 2010. There are 6 streets.

== Geography ==
Karazirikovo is located 23 km northeast of Chekmagush (the district's administrative centre) by road. Kargaly is the nearest rural locality.
