= Tazeyevo =

Tazeyevo Тазеево
- Selo
- Location within Bashkortostan Location within Russia
- Coordinates: 55°36′N 54°33′E
- Country: Russia
- Region: Bashkortostan
- District: Ilishevsky District
- Time zone: UTC+5:00

Tazeyevo (Russian: Тазеево; Bashkir: Тәжәй, Täjäy) is a rural locality (a selo) and the administrative centre of Kuzhbakhtinsky Selsoviet, Ilishevsky District, Bashkortostan, Russia. The population was 518 as of 2010. There are 7 streets.

== Geography ==
Tazeyevo is located 32 km northeast of Verkhneyarkeyevo (the district's administrative centre) by road. Kuzhbakhty is the nearest rural locality.
