= Kinderkulevo =

Kinderkulevo Киндеркулево
- Village
- Location within Bashkortostan Location within Russia
- Coordinates: 55°04′N 54°52′E
- Country: Russia
- Region: Bashkortostan
- District: Chekmagushevsky District
- Time zone: UTC+5:00

Kinderkulevo (Russian: Киндеркулево; Bashkir: Киндеркүл, Kinderkül) is a rural locality (a village) in Chekmagushevsky District, Bashkortostan, Russia. The population was 245 as of 2010. There are 4 streets.

== Geography ==
Kinderkulevo is located 24 km southeast of Chekmagush (the district's administrative centre) by road. Novoikhsanovo is the nearest rural locality.
