= Layashty =

Layashty Лаяшты
- Selo
- Location within Bashkortostan Location within Russia
- Coordinates: 55°28′N 54°36′E
- Country: Russia
- Region: Bashkortostan
- District: Ilishevsky District
- Time zone: UTC+5:00

Layashty (Russian: Лаяшты; Bashkir: Лаяшты, Layaştı) is a rural locality (a selo) in Ishkarovsky Selsoviet, Ilishevsky District, Bashkortostan, Russia. The population was 460 as of 2010. There are 5 streets.

== Geography ==
Layashty is located 23 km east of Verkhneyarkeyevo (the district's administrative centre) by road. Ishkarovo is the nearest rural locality.
