= Narimanovo, Republic of Bashkortostan =

Narimanovo Нариманово
- Village
- Location within Bashkortostan Location within Russia
- Coordinates: 55°10′N 54°38′E
- Country: Russia
- Region: Bashkortostan
- District: Chekmagushevsky District
- Time zone: UTC+5:00

Narimanovo (Russian: Нариманово; Bashkir: Нариман, Nariman) is a rural locality (a village) in Chekmagushevsky District, Bashkortostan, Russia. The population was 315 as of 2010. There are 3 streets.

== Geography ==
Narimanovo is located 4 km north of Chekmagush (the district's administrative centre) by road. Chekmagush is the nearest rural locality.
