= Starokuktovo =

Starokuktovo Старокуктово
- Selo
- Location within Bashkortostan Location within Russia
- Coordinates: 55°27′N 54°14′E
- Country: Russia
- Region: Bashkortostan
- District: Ilishevsky District
- Time zone: UTC+5:00

Starokuktovo (Russian: Старокуктово; Bashkir: Иҫке Күктау, İśke Küktaw) is a rural locality (a selo) and the administrative centre of Starokuktovsky Selsoviet, Ilishevsky District, Bashkortostan, Russia. The population was 669 as of 2010. There are 20 streets.

== Geography ==
Starokuktovo is located 6 km northwest of Verkhneyarkeyevo (the district's administrative centre) by road. Verkhneyarkeyevo is the nearest rural locality.
