= Sary-Aygyr =

Sary-Aygyr Сары-Айгыр
- Village
- Location within Bashkortostan Location within Russia
- Coordinates: 55°11′N 54°19′E
- Country: Russia
- Region: Bashkortostan
- District: Chekmagushevsky District
- Time zone: UTC+5:00

Sary-Aygyr (Russian: Сары-Айгыр; Bashkir: Һары Айғыр, Harı Ayğır) is a rural locality (a village) in Chekmagushevsky District, Bashkortostan, Russia. The population was 16 as of 2010. There is 1 street.

== Geography ==
Sary-Aygyr is located 29 km northwest of Chekmagush (the district's administrative centre) by road. Starobalakovo is the nearest rural locality.
