= Yabalakovo =

Yabalakovo Ябалаково
- Selo
- Location within Bashkortostan Location within Russia
- Coordinates: 55°40′N 54°14′E
- Country: Russia
- Region: Bashkortostan
- District: Ilishevsky District
- Time zone: UTC+5:00

Yabalakovo (Russian: Ябалаково; Bashkir: Ябалаҡ, Yabalaq) is a rural locality (a selo) and the administrative centre of Yabalakovsky Selsoviet, Ilishevsky District, Bashkortostan, Russia. The population was 359 as of 2010. There are 5 streets.

== Geography ==
Yabalakovo is located 39 km north of Verkhneyarkeyevo (the district's administrative centre) by road. Verkhneye Yuldashevo is the nearest rural locality.
