= Chuy-Atasevo =

Chuy-Atasevo Чуй-Атасево
- Village
- Location within Bashkortostan Location within Russia
- Coordinates: 55°39′N 54°32′E
- Country: Russia
- Region: Bashkortostan
- District: Ilishevsky District
- Time zone: UTC+5:00

Chuy-Atasevo (Russian: Чуй-Атасево; Bashkir: Сейәле-Әтәс, Seyäle-Ätäs) is a rural locality (a village) in Bazitamaksky Selsoviet, Ilishevsky District, Bashkortostan, Russia. The population was 310 as of 2010. There are 4 streets.

== Geography ==
Chuy-Atasevo is located 40 km northeast of Verkhneyarkeyevo (the district's administrative centre) by road. Bazitamak is the nearest rural locality.
