= Mari-Meneuz =

Mari-Meneuz Мари-Менеуз
- Village
- Location within Bashkortostan Location within Russia
- Coordinates: 55°38′N 54°30′E
- Country: Russia
- Region: Bashkortostan
- District: Ilishevsky District
- Time zone: UTC+5:00

Mari-Meneuz (Russian: Мари-Менеуз; Bashkir: Мари-Мәнәүез, Mari-Mänäwez) is a rural locality (a village) in Bazitamaksky Selsoviet, Ilishevsky District, Bashkortostan, Russia. The population was 201 as of 2010. There is 1 street.

== Geography ==
Mari-Meneuz is located 37 km northeast of Verkhneyarkeyevo (the district's administrative centre) by road. Bazitamak is the nearest rural locality.
