= Verkhnecherekulevo =

Verkhnecherekulevo Верхнечерекулево
- Village
- Location within Bashkortostan Location within Russia
- Coordinates: 55°29′N 54°21′E
- Country: Russia
- Region: Bashkortostan
- District: Ilishevsky District
- Time zone: UTC+5:00

Verkhnecherekulevo (Russian: Верхнечерекулево; Bashkir: Үрге Сереккүл, Ürge Serekkül) is a rural locality (a village) in Cherekulevsky Selsoviet, Ilishevsky District, Bashkortostan, Russia. The population was 402 as of 2010. There are 29 streets.

== Geography ==
Verkhnecherekulevo is located 7 km northeast of Verkhneyarkeyevo (the district's administrative centre) by road. Nizhneyarkeyevo is the nearest rural locality.
