= Churtanbashevo =

Churtanbashevo Чуртанбашево
- Village
- Location within Bashkortostan Location within Russia
- Coordinates: 55°14′N 54°39′E
- Country: Russia
- Region: Bashkortostan
- District: Chekmagushevsky District
- Time zone: UTC+5:00

Churtanbashevo (Russian: Чуртанбашево; Bashkir: Суртанбаш, Surtanbaş) is a rural locality (a village) in Chekmagushevsky District, Bashkortostan, Russia. The population was 55 as of 2010. There are 2 streets.

== Geography ==
Churtanbashevo is located 21 km north of Chekmagush (the district's administrative centre) by road. Syryshbashevo is the nearest rural locality.
