= Saitkulovo, Ilishevsky District, Republic of Bashkortostan =

Saitkulovo Саиткулово
- Village
- Location within Bashkortostan Location within Russia
- Coordinates: 55°29′N 54°33′E
- Country: Russia
- Region: Bashkortostan
- District: Ilishevsky District
- Time zone: UTC+5:00

Saitkulovo (Russian: Саиткулово; Bashkir: Сәйетҡол, Säyetqol) is a rural locality (a village) in Ishkarovsky Selsoviet, Ilishevsky District, Bashkortostan, Russia. The population was 218 as of 2010. There are 2 streets.

== Geography ==
Saitkulovo is located 19 km east of Verkhneyarkeyevo (the district's administrative centre) by road. Ishkarovo is the nearest rural locality.
