= Novobalakovo =

Novobalakovo Новобалаково
- Selo
- Location within Bashkortostan Location within Russia
- Coordinates: 55°08′N 54°16′E
- Country: Russia
- Region: Bashkortostan
- District: Chekmagushevsky District
- Time zone: UTC+5:00

Novobalakovo (Russian: Новобалаково; Bashkir: Яңы Балаҡ, Yañı Balaq) is a rural locality (a selo) in Chekmagushevsky District, Bashkortostan, Russia. The population was 104 as of 2010. There are 2 streets.

== Geography ==
Novobalakovo is located 32 km west of Chekmagush (the district's administrative centre) by road. Bulyakovo is the nearest rural locality.
