= Anachevo =

Anachevo Аначево
- Village
- Location within Bashkortostan Location within Russia
- Coordinates: 55°42′N 54°24′E
- Country: Russia
- Region: Bashkortostan
- District: Ilishevsky District
- Time zone: UTC+5:00

Anachevo (Russian: Аначево; Bashkir: Әнәс, Änäs) is a rural locality (a village) in Andreyevsky Selsoviet, Ilishevsky District, Bashkortostan, Russia. The population was 324 as of 2010. There are 4 streets.

== Geography ==
Anachevo is located 32 km north of Verkhneyarkeyevo (the district's administrative centre) by road. Andreyevka is the nearest rural locality.
