= Kyzyl-Kuch =

Kyzyl-Kuch Кызыл-Куч
- Village
- Location within Bashkortostan Location within Russia
- Coordinates: 55°23′N 54°02′E
- Country: Russia
- Region: Bashkortostan
- District: Ilishevsky District
- Time zone: UTC+5:00

Kyzyl-Kuch (Russian: Кызыл-Куч; Bashkir: Ҡыҙыл Көс, Qıźıl Kös) is a rural locality (a village) in Kadyrovsky Selsoviet, Ilishevsky District, Bashkortostan, Russia. The population was 5 as of 2010. There is 1 streets.

== Geography ==
Kyzyl-Kuch is located 24 km southwest of Verkhneyarkeyevo (the district's administrative centre) by road. Kadyrovo is the nearest rural locality.
