= Tatarsky Meneuz =

Tatarsky Meneuz Татарский Менеуз
- Village
- Location within Bashkortostan Location within Russia
- Coordinates: 55°37′N 54°28′E
- Country: Russia
- Region: Bashkortostan
- District: Ilishevsky District
- Time zone: UTC+5:00

Tatarsky Meneuz (Russian: Татарский Менеуз; Bashkir: Татар Мөнәүезе, Tatar Mönäweze) is a rural locality (a village) in Bazitamaksky Selsoviet, Ilishevsky District, Bashkortostan, Russia. The population was 156 as of 2010. There are 3 streets.

== Geography ==
Tatarsky Meneuz is located 37 km northeast of Verkhneyarkeyevo (the district's administrative centre) by road. Tashkichi is the nearest rural locality.
