= Zemeyevo =

Zemeyevo Земеево
- Village
- Location within Bashkortostan Location within Russia
- Coordinates: 55°17′N 54°42′E
- Country: Russia
- Region: Bashkortostan
- District: Chekmagushevsky District
- Time zone: UTC+5:00

Zemeyevo (Russian: Земеево; Bashkir: Йәмәй, Yämäy) is a rural locality (a village) in Chekmagushevsky District, Bashkortostan, Russia. The population was 130 as of 2010. There is 1 street.

== Geography ==
Zemeyevo is located 23 km north of Chekmagush (the district's administrative centre) by road. Imyanlikulevo is the nearest rural locality.
