= Bishkurayevo =

Bishkurayevo Бишкураево
- Selo
- Location within Bashkortostan Location within Russia
- Coordinates: 55°18′N 54°32′E
- Country: Russia
- Region: Bashkortostan
- District: Ilishevsky District
- Time zone: UTC+5:00

Bishkurayevo (Russian: Бишкураево; Bashkir: Бишҡурай, Bişquray) is a rural locality (a selo) and the administrative centre of Bishkurayevsky Selsoviet, Ilishevsky District, Bashkortostan, Russia. The population was 433 as of 2010. There are 3 streets.

== Geography ==
Bishkurayevo is located 31 km southeast of Verkhneyarkeyevo (the district's administrative centre) by road. Malo-Bishkurayevo is the nearest rural locality.
