= Votsky Meneuz =

Votsky Meneuz Вотский Менеуз
- Village
- Location within Bashkortostan Location within Russia
- Coordinates: 55°38′N 54°26′E
- Country: Russia
- Region: Bashkortostan
- District: Ilishevsky District
- Time zone: UTC+5:00

Votsky Meneuz (Russian: Вотский Менеуз; Bashkir: Вотяк Мәнәүезе, Votyak Mänäweze) is a rural locality (a village) in Andreyevsky Selsoviet, Ilishevsky District, Bashkortostan, Russia. The population was 4 as of 2010. There are 2 streets.

== Geography ==
Votsky Meneuz is located 35 km north of Verkhneyarkeyevo (the district's administrative centre) by road. Mari-Meneuz is the nearest rural locality.
