= Chiyalikulevo =

Chiyalikulevo Чияликулево
- Village
- Location within Bashkortostan Location within Russia
- Coordinates: 55°04′N 54°23′E
- Country: Russia
- Region: Bashkortostan
- District: Chekmagushevsky District
- Time zone: UTC+5:00

Chiyalikulevo (Russian: Чияликулево; Bashkir: Сейәлеҡул, Seyälequl) is a rural locality (a village) in Chekmagushevsky District, Bashkortostan, Russia. The population was 27 as of 2010. There is 1 street.
