= Gremuchy Klyuch, Kuzhbakhtinsky Selsoviet, Ilishevsky District, Republic of Bashkortostan =

Gremuchy Klyuch Гремучий Ключ
- Village
- Location within Bashkortostan Location within Russia
- Coordinates: 55°37′N 54°38′E
- Country: Russia
- Region: Bashkortostan
- District: Ilishevsky District
- Time zone: UTC+5:00

Gremuchy Klyuch (Russian: Гремучий Ключ) is a rural locality (a village) in Kuzhbakhtinsky Selsoviet, Ilishevsky District, Bashkortostan, Russia. The population was 101 as of 2010.

== Geography ==
It is located 28 km from Verkhneyarkeyevo and 5 km from Tazeyevo.
