= Akhmetovo, Chekmagushevsky District, Republic of Bashkortostan =

Akhmetovo Ахметово
- Selo
- Location within Bashkortostan Location within Russia
- Coordinates: 55°13′N 54°24′E
- Country: Russia
- Region: Bashkortostan
- District: Chekmagushevsky District
- Time zone: UTC+5:00

Akhmetovo (Russian: Ахметово; Bashkir: Әхмәт, Äxmät) is a rural locality (a selo) in Chekmagushevsky District, Bashkortostan, Russia. The population was 326 as of 2010. There are 3 streets.

== Geography ==
Akhmetovo is located 29 km northwest of Chekmagush (the district's administrative centre) by road. Dyumeyevo is the nearest rural locality.
