= Akhmetovo, Aurgazinsky District, Republic of Bashkortostan =

Akhmetovo Ахметово
- Village
- Location within Bashkortostan Location within Russia
- Coordinates: 54°13′N 55°48′E
- Country: Russia
- Region: Bashkortostan
- District: Aurgazinsky District
- Time zone: UTC+5:00

Akhmetovo (Russian: Ахметово; Bashkir: Әхмәт, Äxmät) is a rural locality (a village) in Tukayevsky Selsoviet, Aurgazinsky District, Bashkortostan, Russia. The population was 38 as of 2010. There is 1 street.

== Geography ==
Akhmetovo is located 29 km north of Tolbazy (the district's administrative centre) by road. Staraya Ivanovka is the nearest rural locality.
