= Akhmetovo, Abzelilovsky District, Republic of Bashkortostan =

Akhmetovo Ахметово Әхмәт
- Village
- Location within Bashkortostan Location within Russia
- Coordinates: 53°13′N 58°10′E
- Country: Russia
- Region: Bashkortostan
- District: Abzelilovsky District
- Time zone: UTC+5:00

Akhmetovo (Russian: Ахметово, Bashkir: Әхмәт, Äxmät) is a rural locality (a village) in Kirdasovsky Selsoviet, Abzelilovsky District, Bashkortostan, Russia. The population was 145 as of 2010. There are 3 streets.

== Geography ==
Akhmetovo is located 31 km southwest of Askarovo (the district's administrative centre) by road. Kirdasovo is the nearest rural locality.
