= Akhmetovo, Blagovarsky District, Republic of Bashkortostan =

Akhmetovo Ахметово
- Village
- Location within Bashkortostan Location within Russia
- Coordinates: 54°54′N 54°54′E
- Country: Russia
- Region: Bashkortostan
- District: Blagovarsky District
- Time zone: UTC+5:00

Akhmetovo (Russian: Ахметово; Bashkir: Әхмәт, Äxmät) is a rural locality (a village) in Kucherbayevsky Selsoviet, Blagovarsky District, Bashkortostan, Russia. The population was 139 as of 2010. There are 3 streets.

== Geography ==
Akhmetovo is located 31 km north of Yazykovo (the district's administrative centre) by road. Tyurkeyevo is the nearest rural locality.
