= Akhmetovo, Kushnarenkovsky District, Republic of Bashkortostan =

Akhmetovo Ахметово
- Selo
- Location within Bashkortostan Location within Russia
- Coordinates: 55°05′N 55°30′E
- Country: Russia
- Region: Bashkortostan
- District: Kushnarenkovsky District
- Time zone: UTC+5:00

Akhmetovo (Russian: Ахметово; Bashkir: Әхмәт, Äxmät) is a rural locality (a selo) and the administrative centre of Akhmetovsky Selsoviet, Kushnarenkovsky District, Bashkortostan, Russia. The population was 886 as of 2010. There are 7 streets.

== Geography ==
Akhmetovo is located 16 km east of Kushnarenkovo (the district's administrative centre) by road. Kanly is the nearest rural locality.
