= Chekmagush =

Chekmagush Чекмагуш
- Selo

Other transcription(s)
  - Bashkir: Саҡмағош
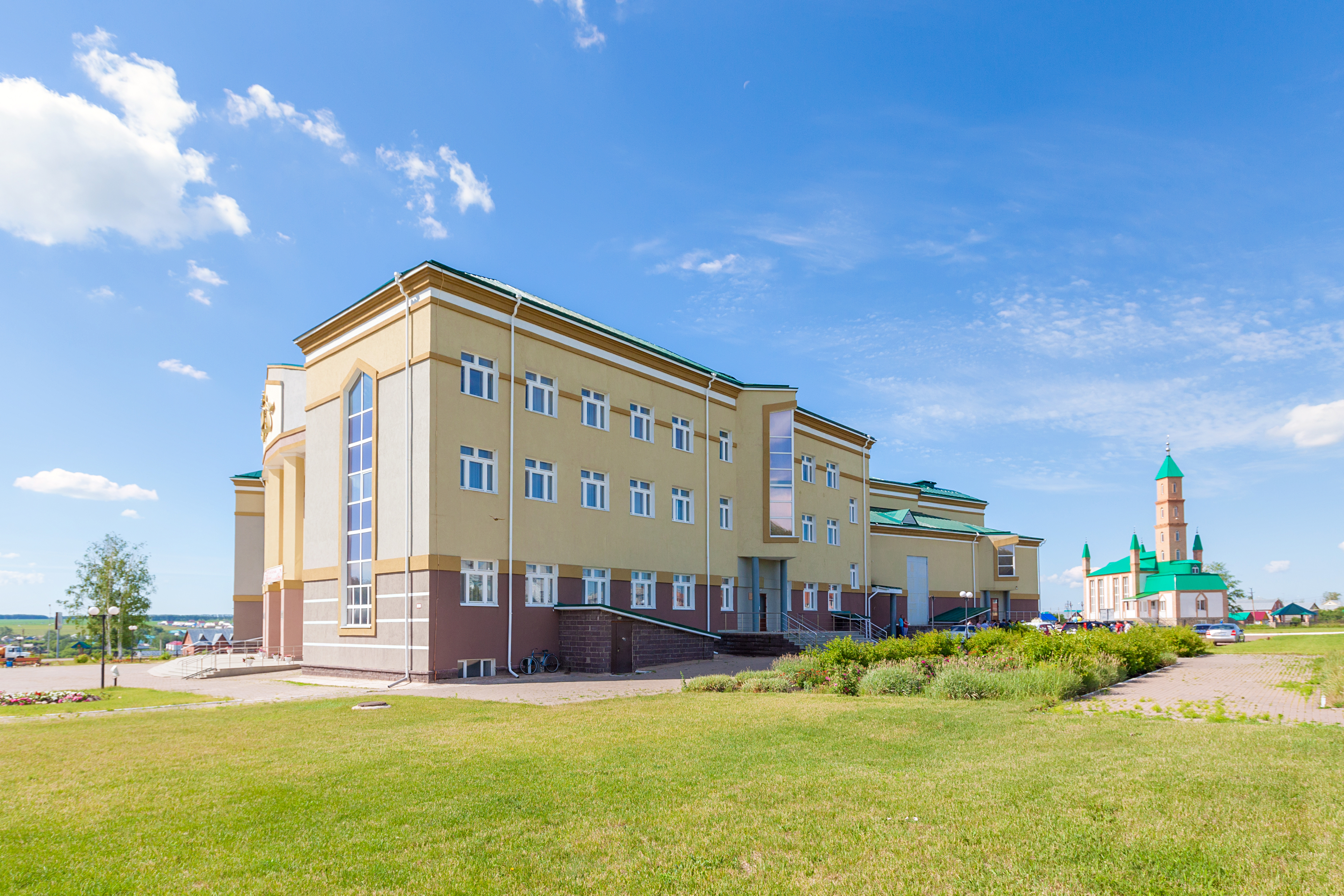
- Chekmagushevsky District Palace of Culture
- Interactive map of Chekmagush
- Location of Chekmagush Chekmagush (Bashkortostan)
- Coordinates: 55°08′N 54°40′E
- Country: Russia
- Federal subject: Bashkortostan
- Administrative district: Chekmagushevsky District
- SelsovietSelsoviet: Chekmagushevsky
- First attested: 1765

Population (2010 Census)
  - Total: 11,382
  - Estimate (2010): 11,382 (0%)

Administrative status
  - Capital of: Chekmagushevsky District, Chekmagushevsky Selsoviet

Municipal status
  - Municipal district: Chekmagushevsky Municipal District
  - Rural settlement: Chekmagushevsky Rural Settlement
  - Capital of: Chekmagushevsky Municipal District, Chekmagushevsky Rural Settlement
- Time zone: UTC+5 (MSK+2)
- Postal codes: 452200, 452201, 452229
- OKTMO ID: 80656470101

Chekmagush population
- 2010 Census: 11,382
- 2002 Census: 11,204
- 1989 Census: 10,164
- 1979 Census: 9,104

Chekmagush (Russian: Чекмагу́ш; Bashkir: Саҡмағош, Saqmağoş) is a rural locality (a selo) and the administrative center of Chekmagushevsky District in the Republic of Bashkortostan, Russia. As of the 2010 Census, its population was 11,382.

== History ==
It was first attested in 1765 and named after a hydronym.
