= Chekmagushevsky District =

Chekmagushevsky District Чекмагушевский район (Russian)
- District

Other transcription(s)
  - Bashkir: Саҡмағош районы
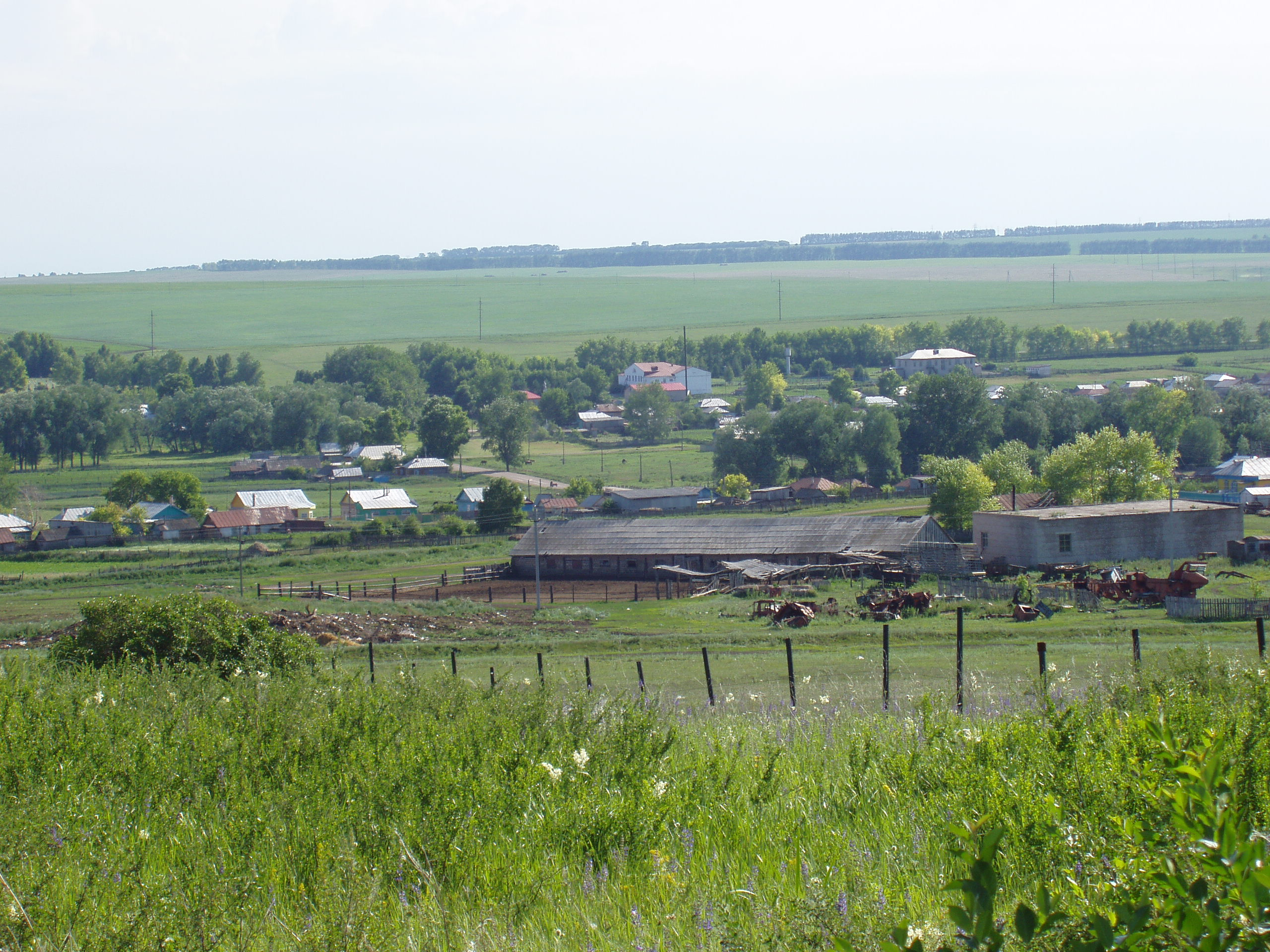
- View of Starokalmashevo, Chekmagushevsky District

- Flag Coat of arms
- Location of Chekmagushevsky District in the Republic of Bashkortostan
- Coordinates: 55°08′N 54°39′E
- Country: Russia
- Federal subject: Republic of Bashkortostan
- Established: 1930
- Administrative center: Chekmagush

Area
  - Total: 1,692 km^{2} (653 sq mi)

Population (2010 Census)
  - Total: 30,780
  - Estimate (2018): 28,403 (−7.7%)
  - Density: 18.19/km^{2} (47.12/sq mi)
  - Urban: 0%
  - Rural: 100%

Administrative structure
  - Administrative divisions: 13 Selsoviets
  - Inhabited localities: 78 rural localities

Municipal structure
  - Municipally incorporated as: Chekmagushevsky Municipal District
  - Municipal divisions: 0 urban settlements, 13 rural settlements
- Time zone: UTC+5 (MSK+2)
- OKTMO ID: 80656000
- Website: http://www.chekmagush.com

Population of Chekmagushevsky District
- 2010 Census: 30,780
- 2002 Census: 33,031
- 1989 Census: 32,738
- 1979 Census: 39,542

Chekmagushevsky District (Russian: Чекмагу́шевский райо́н; Bashkir: Саҡмағош районы, romanized: Saqmağoş rayonı) is an administrative and municipal district (raion), one of the fifty-four in the Republic of Bashkortostan, Russia. It is located in the west of the republic and borders with Dyurtyulinsky District in the north, Kushnarenkovsky District in the east, Blagovarsky District in the southeast, Buzdyaksky District in the south, Sharansky District in the southwest, Bakalinsky District in the west, and with Ilishevsky District in the northwest. The area of the district is 1,692 square kilometers (653 sq mi). Its administrative center is the rural locality (a selo) of Chekmagush. As of the 2010 Census, the total population of the district was 30,780, with the population of Chekmagush accounting for 37.0% of that number.

== History ==
The district was established in 1930.

== Administrative and municipal status ==
Within the framework of administrative divisions, Chekmagushevsky District is one of the fifty-four in the Republic of Bashkortostan. The district is divided into thirteen selsoviets, comprising seventy-eight rural localities. As a municipal division, the district is incorporated as Chekmagushevsky Municipal District. Its thirteen selsoviets are incorporated as thirteen rural settlements within the municipal district. The selo of Chekmagush serves as the administrative center of both the administrative and municipal district.
