= Verkhneyarkeyevo =

Verkhneyarkeyevo Верхнеяркеево
- Selo

Other transcription(s)
  - Bashkir: Үрге Йәркәй
- Interactive map of Verkhneyarkeyevo
- Location of Verkhneyarkeyevo Verkhneyarkeyevo (Bashkortostan)
- Coordinates: 55°26′45″N 54°19′00″E
- Country: Russia
- Federal subject: Bashkortostan
- Administrative district: Ilishevsky District
- SelsovietSelsoviet: Yarkeyevsky

Population (2010 Census)
  - Total: 9,710
  - Estimate (2017): 9,384 (−3.4%)

Administrative status
  - Capital of: Ilishevsky District, Yarkeyevsky Selsoviet

Municipal status
  - Municipal district: Ilishevsky Municipal District
  - Rural settlement: Yarkeyevsky Selsoviet Rural Settlement
  - Capital of: Ilishevsky Municipal District, Yarkeyevsky Selsoviet Rural Settlement
- Time zone: UTC+5 (MSK+2)
- Postal code: 452260
- OKTMO ID: 80630484101

Verkhneyarkeyevo (Russian: Верхнеяркеево; Bashkir: Үрге Йәркәй, Ürge Yärkäy) is a rural locality (a selo) and the administrative center of Ilishevsky District in the Republic of Bashkortostan, Russia. Population: 9,710 (2010 census); 9,339 (2002 census); 8,001 (1989 Soviet census).
