= Ilishevsky District =

Ilishevsky District Илишевский район (Russian)
- District

Other transcription(s)
  - Bashkir: Илеш районы
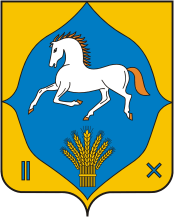
- Flag Coat of arms
- Location of Ilishevsky District in the Republic of Bashkortostan
- Coordinates: 55°27′N 54°19′E
- Country: Russia
- Federal subject: Republic of Bashkortostan
- Established: January 31, 1935
- Administrative center: Verkhneyarkeyevo

Area
  - Total: 1,980.53 km^{2} (764.69 sq mi)

Population (2010 Census)
  - Total: 34,654
  - Density: 17.497/km^{2} (45.318/sq mi)
  - Urban: 0%
  - Rural: 100%

Administrative structure
  - Administrative divisions: 22 Selsoviets
  - Inhabited localities: 87 rural localities

Municipal structure
  - Municipally incorporated as: Ilishevsky Municipal District
  - Municipal divisions: 0 urban settlements, 22 rural settlements
- Time zone: UTC+5 (MSK+2)
- OKTMO ID: 80630000
- Website: https://ilesh.bashkortostan.ru/

Population of Ilishevsky District
- 2010 Census: 34,654
- 2002 Census: 36,281
- 1989 Census: 36,046
- 1979 Census: 42,684

Ilishevsky District (Russian: Или́шевский райо́н; Bashkir: Илеш районы, İleş rayonı) is an administrative and municipal district (raion), one of the fifty-four in the Republic of Bashkortostan, Russia. It is located in the northwest of the republic and borders with Krasnokamsky District in the north, Dyurtyulinsky District in the east, Chekmagushevsky District in the southeast and south, Bakalinsky District in the southwest, and with the Republic of Tatarstan in the west. The area of the district is 1,980.53 square kilometers (764.69 sq mi). Its administrative center is the rural locality (a selo) of Verkhneyarkeyevo. As of the 2010 Census, the total population of the district was 34,654, with the population of Verkhneyarkeyevo accounting for 28.0% of that number.

== History ==
The district was established on January 31, 1935 from the parts of Bakalinsky, Chekmagushevsky, and Dyurtyulinsky Districts.

== Administrative and municipal status ==
Within the framework of administrative divisions, Ilishevsky District is one of the fifty-four in the Republic of Bashkortostan. The district is divided into twenty-two selsoviets, comprising eighty-seven rural localities. As a municipal division, the district is incorporated as Ilishevsky Municipal District. Its twenty-two selsoviets are incorporated as twenty-two rural settlements within the municipal district. The selo of Verkhneyarkeyevo serves as the administrative center of both the administrative and municipal district.
