= Yanaul (inhabited locality) =

Yanaul (Russian: Янаул) is the name of several inhabited localities in the Republic of Bashkortostan, Russia.

Urban localities

- Yanaul, a town; administratively incorporated as a town of republic significance

Rural localities

- Yanaul, Askinsky District, Republic of Bashkortostan, a village in Mutabashevsky Selsoviet of Askinsky District
- Yanaul, Novoyanzigitovsky Selsoviet, Krasnokamsky District, Republic of Bashkortostan, a village in Novoyanzigitovsky Selsoviet of Krasnokamsky District
- Yanaul, Shushnursky Selsoviet, Krasnokamsky District, Republic of Bashkortostan, a village in Shushnursky Selsoviet of Krasnokamsky District
- Yanaul, Kugarchinsky District, Republic of Bashkortostan, a selo in Isimovsky Selsoviet of Kugarchinsky District
