= Amirovo =

Village in Askinsky District, Bashkortostan, Russia

Amirovo Амирово
- Village
- Location within Bashkortostan Location within Russia
- Coordinates: 56°02′N 56°58′E
- Country: Russia
- Region: Bashkortostan
- District: Askinsky District
- Time zone: UTC+5:00

Amirovo (Russian: Амирово; Bashkir: Әмир, Ämir) is a rural locality (a village) in Kashkinsky Selsoviet, Askinsky District, Bashkortostan, Russia. The population was 304 as of 2010. There are six streets.

== Geography ==
Amirovo is located 37 km southeast of Askino (the district's administrative centre) by road. Kashkino is the nearest rural locality.
