= Avaday =

Village in Askinsky District, Bashkortostan, Russia

Avaday Авадай
- Village
- Location within Bashkortostan Location within Russia
- Coordinates: 56°07′N 56°41′E
- Country: Russia
- Region: Bashkortostan
- District: Askinsky District
- Time zone: UTC+5:00

Avaday (Russian: Авадай; Bashkir: Әүәҙәй, Äwäźäy) is a rural locality (a village) in Kubiyazovsky Selsoviet of Askinsky District, Bashkortostan, Russia. The population was 13 as of 2010. There are 2 streets.

== Geography ==
Avaday is located 20 km northeast of Askino (the district's administrative centre) by road. Novaya Burma is the nearest rural locality.

== Ethnicity ==
The village is inhabited by Bashkirs.
