= Alyagish =

Village in Askinsky District, Bashkortostan, Russia

Alyagish Альягиш
- Village
- Location within Bashkortostan Location within Russia
- Coordinates: 56°10′N 56°16′E
- Country: Russia
- Region: Bashkortostan
- District: Askinsky District
- Time zone: UTC+5:00

Alyagish (Russian: Альягиш; Bashkir: Алъяғыш, Alyağış) is a rural locality (a village) in Kazanchinsky Selsoviet, Askinsky District, Bashkortostan, Russia. The population was 94 as of 2010. There is 1 street.

== Geography ==
Alyagish is located 36 km northwest of Askino (the district's administrative centre) by road. Yankisyak is the nearest rural locality.
