= Arbashevo =

Selo in Askinsky District, Bashkortostan, Russia

Arbashevo Арбашево
- Selo
- Location within Bashkortostan Location within Russia
- Coordinates: 55°57′N 56°21′E
- Country: Russia
- Region: Bashkortostan
- District: Askinsky District
- Time zone: UTC+5:00

Arbashevo (Russian: Арбашево; Bashkir: Арбаш, Arbaş) is a rural locality (a selo) and the administrative center of Arbashevsky Selsoviet, Askinsky District, Bashkortostan, Russia. The population was 209 as of 2010. There are 9 streets.

== Geography ==
Arbashevo is located 32 km southwest of Askino (the district's administrative centre) by road. Kuchanovo is the nearest rural locality.
