= Davlyatovka =

Village in Askinsky District, Bashkortostan, Russia

Davlyatovka Давлятовка
- Village
- Location within Bashkortostan Location within Russia
- Coordinates: 56°05′N 56°24′E
- Country: Russia
- Region: Bashkortostan
- District: Askinsky District
- Time zone: UTC+5:00

Davlyatovka (Russian: Давлятовка; Bashkir: Дәүләт, Däwlät) is a rural locality (a village) in Petropavlovsky Selsoviet, Askinsky District, Bashkortostan, Russia. The population was 129 as of 2010. There are 3 streets.

== Geography ==
Davlyatovka is located 11 km west of Askino (the district's administrative centre) by road. Petropavlovka is the nearest rural locality.
