= Staraya Kara =

Village in Askinsky District, Bashkortostan, Russia

Staraya Kara Старая Кара
- Village
- Location within Bashkortostan Location within Russia
- Coordinates: 56°07′N 56°13′E
- Country: Russia
- Region: Bashkortostan
- District: Askinsky District
- Time zone: UTC+5:00

Staraya Kara (Russian: Старая Кара; Bashkir: Иҫке Ҡара, İśke Qara) is a rural locality (a village) in Kazanchinsky Selsoviet, Askinsky District, Bashkortostan, Russia. The population was 39 as of 2010. There is 1 street.

== Geography ==
Staraya Kara is located 43 km west of Askino (the district's administrative centre) by road. Novaya Kara is the nearest rural locality.
