= Yenaktayevo =

Yenaktayevo Енактаево
- Village
- Location within Bashkortostan Location within Russia
- Coordinates: 55°59′N 54°22′E
- Country: Russia
- Region: Bashkortostan
- District: Krasnokamsky District
- Time zone: UTC+5:00

Yenaktayevo (Russian: Енактаево; Bashkir: Янаҡтай, Yanaqtay; Meadow Mari: Чормак, Čormak) is a rural locality (a village) in Kariyevsky Selsoviet, Krasnokamsky District, Bashkortostan, Russia. The population was 96 as of 2010. There are 4 streets.

== Geography ==
Yenaktayevo is located 26 km southeast of Nikolo-Beryozovka (the district's administrative centre) by road. Kariyevo is the nearest rural locality.
