= Kadrekovo =

Kadrekovo Кадреково
- Village
- Location within Bashkortostan Location within Russia
- Coordinates: 56°08′N 54°23′E
- Country: Russia
- Region: Bashkortostan
- District: Krasnokamsky District
- Time zone: UTC+5:00

Kadrekovo (Russian: Кадреково; Bashkir: Кадрик, Kadrik) is a rural locality (a village) in Razdolyevsky Selsoviet, Krasnokamsky District, Bashkortostan, Russia. The population was 100 as of 2010. There are 2 streets.

== Geography ==
Kadrekovo is located 18 km east of Nikolo-Beryozovka (the district's administrative centre) by road. Razdolye is the nearest rural locality.
