= Urtaul =

Urtaul Уртаул
- Village
- Location within Bashkortostan Location within Russia
- Coordinates: 55°50′N 54°18′E
- Country: Russia
- Region: Bashkortostan
- District: Krasnokamsky District
- Time zone: UTC+5:00

Urtaul (Russian: Уртаул; Bashkir: Уртауыл, Urtawıl) is a rural locality (a village) in Novoyanzigitovsky Selsoviet, Krasnokamsky District, Bashkortostan, Russia. The population was 14 as of 2010. There are 2 streets.

== Geography ==
Urtaul is located 41 km south of Nikolo-Beryozovka (the district's administrative centre) by road. Staraya Mushta is the nearest rural locality.
