= Novokhazino =

Novokhazino Новохазино
- Village
- Location within Bashkortostan Location within Russia
- Coordinates: 55°50′N 54°38′E
- Country: Russia
- Region: Bashkortostan
- District: Krasnokamsky District
- Time zone: UTC+5:00

Novokhazino (Russian: Новохазино; Bashkir: Яңы Хажи, Yañı Xajı) is a rural locality (a village) in Kuyanovsky Selsoviet, Krasnokamsky District, Bashkortostan, Russia. The population was 339 as of 2010. There are 5 streets.

== Geography ==
Novokhazino is located 56 km southeast of Nikolo-Beryozovka (the district's administrative centre) by road. Taktalachuk is the nearest rural locality.
