= Kamashady =

Village in Askinsky District, Bashkortostan, Russia

Kamashady Камашады
- Village
- Location within Bashkortostan Location within Russia
- Coordinates: 56°05′N 57°09′E
- Country: Russia
- Region: Bashkortostan
- District: Askinsky District
- Time zone: UTC+5:00

Kamashady (Russian: Камашады; Bashkir: Ҡамашиҙе, Qamaşiźe) is a rural locality (a village) in Sultanbekovsky Selsoviet, Askinsky District, Bashkortostan, Russia. The population was 10 as of 2010. There are 2 streets.

== Geography ==
Kamashady is located 44 km east of Askino (the district's administrative centre) by road. Churashevo is the nearest rural locality.
