= Upkankul =

Village in Askinsky District, Bashkortostan, Russia

Upkankul Упканкуль
- Village
- Location within Bashkortostan Location within Russia
- Coordinates: 55°55′N 56°29′E
- Country: Russia
- Region: Bashkortostan
- District: Askinsky District
- Time zone: UTC+5:00

Upkankul (Russian: Упканкуль; Bashkir: Упҡанкүл, Upqankül) is a rural locality (a village) in Yevbulyaksky Selsoviet, Askinsky District, Bashkortostan, Russia. The population was 404 as of 2010. There are 10 streets.

== Geography ==
Upkankul is located 21 km south of Askino (the district's administrative centre) by road. Itkuli is the nearest rural locality.
