= Bilgish =

Village in Askinsky District, Bashkortostan, Russia

Bilgish Бильгиш
- Village
- Location within Bashkortostan Location within Russia
- Coordinates: 56°00′N 56°54′E
- Country: Russia
- Region: Bashkortostan
- District: Askinsky District
- Time zone: UTC+5:00

Bilgish (Russian: Бильгиш; Bashkir: Билгеш, Bilgeş) is a rural locality (a village) in Kashkinsky Selsoviet, Askinsky District, Bashkortostan, Russia. The population was 329 as of 2010. There are seven streets.

== Geography ==
Bilgish is located 31 km southeast of Askino (the district's administrative centre) by road. Kashkino is the nearest rural locality.
