= Ashit, Republic of Bashkortostan =

Ashit Ашит
- Village
- Location within Bashkortostan Location within Russia
- Coordinates: 55°57′N 54°08′E
- Country: Russia
- Region: Bashkortostan
- District: Krasnokamsky District
- Time zone: UTC+5:00

Ashit (Russian: Ашит; Bashkir: Әшит, Äşit) is a rural locality (a village) in Novonagayevsky Selsoviet, Krasnokamsky District, Bashkortostan, Russia. The population was 71 as of 2010. There are 3 streets.

== Geography ==
Ashit is located 33 km south of Nikolo-Beryozovka (the district's administrative centre) by road. Ivanovka is the nearest rural locality.
