= Saklovo =

Saklovo Саклово
- Selo
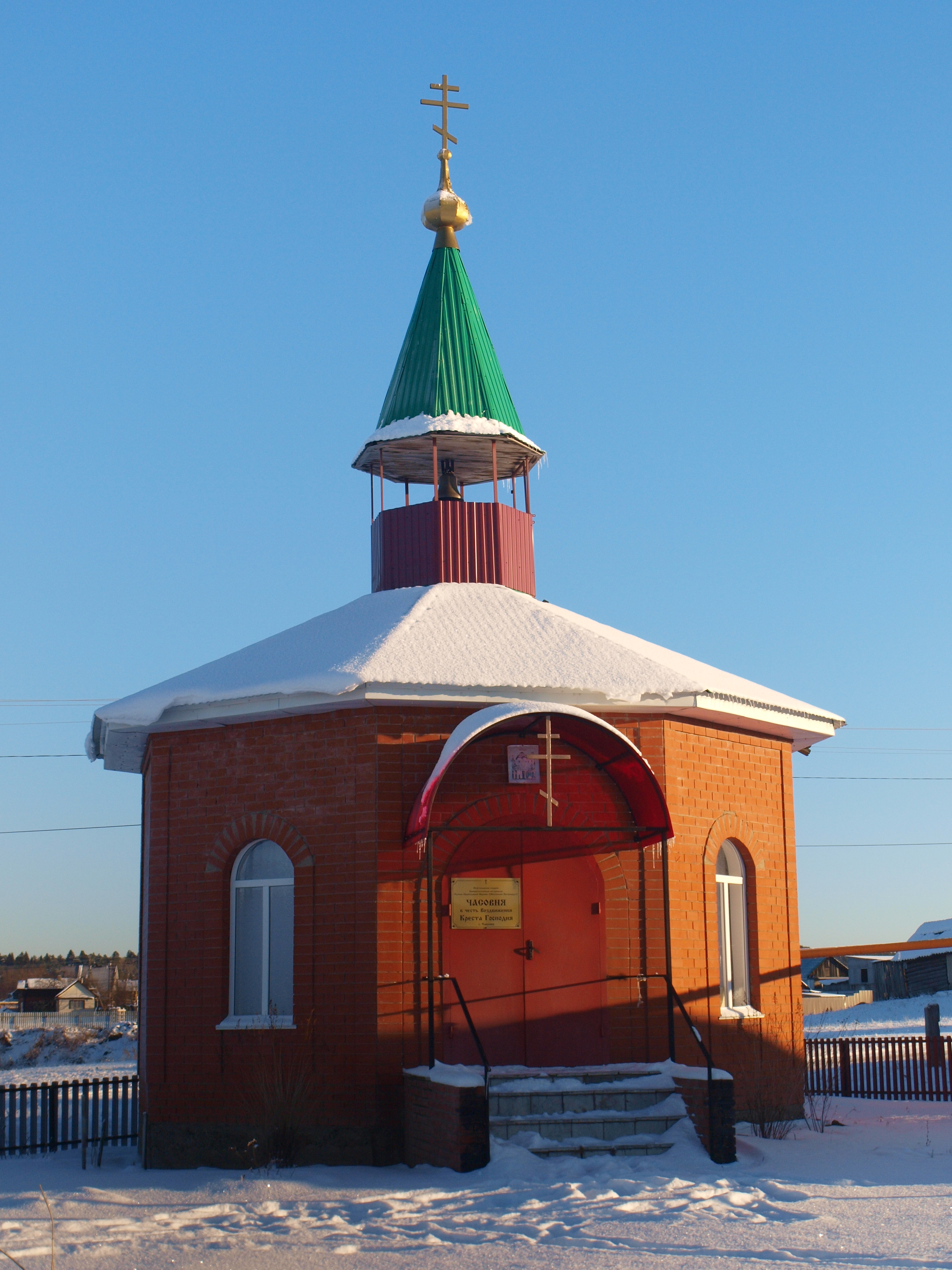

- Location within Bashkortostan Location within Russia
- Coordinates: 55°59′N 54°01′E
- Country: Russia
- Region: Bashkortostan
- District: Krasnokamsky District
- Time zone: UTC+5:00

Saklovo (Russian: Саклово; Bashkir: Һаҡлау, Haqlaw) is a rural locality (a selo) in Sauzbashevsky Selsoviet, Krasnokamsky District, Bashkortostan, Russia. The population was 388 as of 2010. There are 9 streets.

== Geography ==
Saklovo is located 40 km southwest of Nikolo-Beryozovka (the district's administrative centre) by road. Sauzbash is the nearest rural locality.
