= Shushnur =

Shushnur Шушнур
- Selo
- Location within Bashkortostan Location within Russia
- Coordinates: 55°53′N 54°21′E
- Country: Russia
- Region: Bashkortostan
- District: Krasnokamsky District
- Time zone: UTC+5:00

Shushnur (Russian: Шушнур; Bashkir: Шушнур, Şuşnur) is a rural locality (a selo) and the administrative centre of Shushnursky Selsoviet, Krasnokamsky District, Bashkortostan, Russia. The population was 471 as of 2010. There are 5 streets.

== Geography ==
Shushnur is located 36 km southeast of Nikolo-Beryozovka (the district's administrative centre) by road. Novaya Mushta is the nearest rural locality.
