= Novy Mutabash =

Village in Askinsky District, Bashkortostan, Russia

Novy Mutabash Новый Мутабаш
- Village
- Location within Bashkortostan Location within Russia
- Coordinates: 56°15′N 56°21′E
- Country: Russia
- Region: Bashkortostan
- District: Askinsky District
- Time zone: UTC+5:00

Novy Mutabash (Russian: Новый Мутабаш; Bashkir: Яңы Мутабаш, Yañı Mutabaş) is a rural locality (a village) in Mutabashevsky Selsoviet, Askinsky District, Bashkortostan, Russia. The population was 45 as of 2010. There are 3 streets.

== Geography ==
Novy Mutabash is located 39 km northwest of Askino (the district's administrative centre) by road. Kshlau-Yelga is the nearest rural locality.
