= Kungakbash =

Village in Askinsky District, Bashkortostan, Russia

Kungakbash Кунгакбаш
- Village
- Location within Bashkortostan Location within Russia
- Coordinates: 56°14′N 57°21′E
- Country: Russia
- Region: Bashkortostan
- District: Askinsky District
- Time zone: UTC+5:00

Kungakbash (Russian: Кунгакбаш; Bashkir: Көнгәкбаш, Köngäkbaş) is a rural locality (a village) in Kungakovsky Selsoviet, Askinsky District, Bashkortostan, Russia. The population was 1 as of 2010. There is 1 street.

== Geography ==
Kungakbash is located 61 km northeast of Askino (the district's administrative centre) by road. Kungak is the nearest rural locality.
