= Novaya Kara =

Village in Askinsky District, Bashkortostan, Russia

Novaya Kara Новая Кара
- Village
- Location within Bashkortostan Location within Russia
- Coordinates: 56°07′N 56°15′E
- Country: Russia
- Region: Bashkortostan
- District: Askinsky District
- Time zone: UTC+5:00

Novaya Kara (Russian: Новая Кара; Bashkir: Яңы Ҡара, Yañı Qara) is a rural locality (a village) in Kazanchinsky Selsoviet, Askinsky District, Bashkortostan, Russia. The population was 167 as of 2010. There are 5 streets.

== Geography ==
Novaya Kara is located 42 km northwest of Askino (the district's administrative centre) by road. Staraya Kara is the nearest rural locality.
