= Burnyush =

Burnyush Бурнюш
- Village
- Location within Bashkortostan Location within Russia
- Coordinates: 55°47′N 54°22′E
- Country: Russia
- Region: Bashkortostan
- District: Krasnokamsky District
- Time zone: UTC+5:00

Burnyush (Russian: Бурнюш; Bashkir: Бурныш, Burnış) is a rural locality (a village) in Novokainlykovsky Selsoviet, Krasnokamsky District, Bashkortostan, Russia. The population was 197 as of 2010. There are 2 streets.

== Geography ==
Burnyush is located 69 km south of Nikolo-Beryozovka (the district's administrative centre) by road. Kirgizovo is the nearest rural locality.
