= Apasevo =

Apasevo Апасево
- Village
- Location within Bashkortostan Location within Russia
- Coordinates: 56°10′N 54°34′E
- Country: Russia
- Region: Bashkortostan
- District: Krasnokamsky District
- Time zone: UTC+5:00

Apasevo (Russian: Апасево; Bashkir: Апас, Apas) is a rural locality (a village) in Nikolsky Selsoviet, Krasnokamsky District, Bashkortostan, Russia. The population was 111 as of 2010. There are 2 streets.

== Geography ==
Apasevo is located 32 km northeast of Nikolo-Beryozovka (the district's administrative centre) by road. Nikolskoye is the nearest rural locality.
