= Kuzgovo =

Kuzgovo Кузгово
- Village
- Location within Bashkortostan Location within Russia
- Coordinates: 55°53′N 54°03′E
- Country: Russia
- Region: Bashkortostan
- District: Krasnokamsky District
- Time zone: UTC+5:00

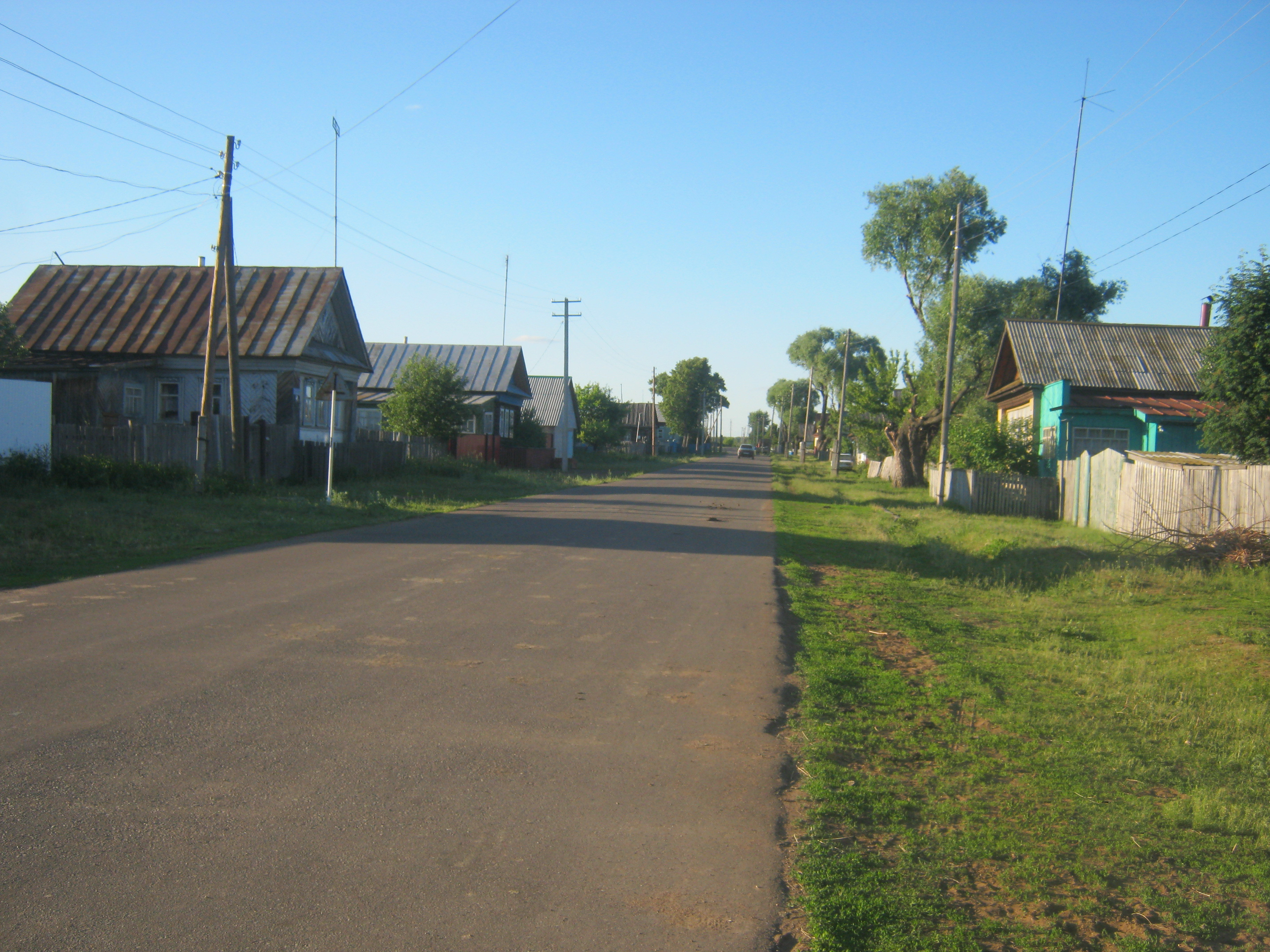
Street in Kuzgovo, Russia

Kuzgovo (Russian: Кузгово; Bashkir: Ҡыҙғау, Qıźğaw) is a rural locality (a village) in Novokabanovsky Selsoviet, Krasnokamsky District, Bashkortostan, Russia. The population was 238 as of 2010. There are 3 streets.

== Geography ==
Kuzgovo is located 41 km south of Nikolo-Beryozovka (the district's administrative centre) by road. Bachkitau is the nearest rural locality.
