= Olkhovy Klyuch =

Village in Askinsky District, Bashkortostan, Russia

Olkhovy Klyuch Ольховый Ключ
- Village
- Location within Bashkortostan Location within Russia
- Coordinates: 56°06′N 56°20′E
- Country: Russia
- Region: Bashkortostan
- District: Askinsky District
- Time zone: UTC+5:00

Olkhovy Klyuch (Russian: Ольховый Ключ; Bashkir: Ерекле Шишмә, Yerekle Şişmä) is a rural locality (a village) in Petropavlovsky Selsoviet, Askinsky District, Bashkortostan, Russia. The population was 42 as of 2010. There is 1 street.

== Geography ==
Olkhovy Klyuch is located 20 km west of Askino (the district's administrative centre) by road. Novaya Kara is the nearest rural locality.
