= Bolshaya Amzya =

Bolshaya Amzya Большая Амзя
- Village
- Location within Bashkortostan Location within Russia
- Coordinates: 56°07′N 54°23′E
- Country: Russia
- Region: Bashkortostan
- District: Krasnokamsky District
- Time zone: UTC+5:00

Bolshaya Amzya (Russian: Большая Амзя; Bashkir: Оло Әмзә, Olo Ämzä) is a rural locality (a village) in Razdolyevsky Selsoviet, Krasnokamsky District, Bashkortostan, Russia. The population was 141 as of 2010. There are 3 streets.

== Geography ==
Bolshaya Amzya is located 21 km east of Nikolo-Beryozovka (the district's administrative centre) by road. Razdolye is the nearest rural locality.
