= Kubiyazy =

Selo in Askinsky District, Bashkortostan, Russia

Kubiyazy Кубиязы
- Selo
- Location within Bashkortostan Location within Russia
- Coordinates: 56°06′N 56°44′E
- Country: Russia
- Region: Bashkortostan
- District: Askinsky District
- Time zone: UTC+5:00

Kubiyazy (Russian: Кубиязы; Bashkir: Ҡубыяҙ, Qubıyaź) is a rural locality (a selo) and the administrative center of Kubiyazovsky Selsoviet, Askinsky District, Bashkortostan, Russia. The population was 1,212 as of 2010. There are 20 streets.

== Geography ==
Kubiyazy is located 14 km east of Askino (the district's administrative centre) by road. Utyashino is the nearest rural locality.
