= Vedresevo =

Vedresevo Ведресево
- Village
- Location within Bashkortostan Location within Russia
- Coordinates: 56°09′N 54°36′E
- Country: Russia
- Region: Bashkortostan
- District: Krasnokamsky District
- Time zone: UTC+5:00

Vedresevo (Russian: Ведресево) is a rural locality (a village) in Nikolsky Selsoviet, Krasnokamsky District, Bashkortostan, Russia. The population was 97 as of 2010. There are 2 streets.

== Geography ==
Vedresevo is located 34 km east of Nikolo-Beryozovka (the district's administrative centre) by road. Kichikir is the nearest rural locality.
