= Starourazayevo =

Starourazayevo Староуразаево
- Village
- Location within Bashkortostan Location within Russia
- Coordinates: 56°01′N 54°11′E
- Country: Russia
- Region: Bashkortostan
- District: Krasnokamsky District
- Time zone: UTC+5:00

Starourazayevo (Russian: Староуразаево; Bashkir: Иҫке Уразай, İśke Urazay) is a rural locality (a village) in Arlansky Selsoviet, Krasnokamsky District, Bashkortostan, Russia. The population was 36 as of 2010. There are 3 streets.

== Geography ==
Starourazayevo is located 20 km south of Nikolo-Beryozovka (the district's administrative centre) by road. Novourazayevo is the nearest rural locality.
