= Utyashino =

Village in Askinsky District, Bashkortostan, Russia

Utyashino Утяшино
- Village
- Location within Bashkortostan Location within Russia
- Coordinates: 56°05′N 56°48′E
- Country: Russia
- Region: Bashkortostan
- District: Askinsky District
- Time zone: UTC+5:00

Utyashino (Russian: Утяшино; Bashkir: Үтәш, Ütäş) is a rural locality (a village) in Kubiyazovsky Selsoviet, Askinsky District, Bashkortostan, Russia. The population was 182 as of 2010. There are 5 streets.

== Geography ==
Utyashino is located 18 km east of Askino (the district's administrative centre) by road. Kubiyazy is the nearest rural locality.
