= Shorokhovo =

Village in Askinsky District, Bashkortostan, Russia

Shorokhovo Шорохово
- Village
- Location within Bashkortostan Location within Russia
- Coordinates: 56°04′N 56°28′E
- Country: Russia
- Region: Bashkortostan
- District: Askinsky District
- Time zone: UTC+5:00

Shorokhovo (Russian: Шорохово) is a rural locality (a village) in Petropavlovsky Selsoviet, Askinsky District, Bashkortostan, Russia. The population was 122 as of 2010. There are 2 streets.

== Geography ==
Shorokhovo is located 8 km west of Askino (the district's administrative centre) by road. Lyubimovka is the nearest rural locality.
