= Novonagayevo =

Novonagayevo Новонагаево
- Selo
- Location within Bashkortostan Location within Russia
- Coordinates: 55°55′N 54°14′E
- Country: Russia
- Region: Bashkortostan
- District: Krasnokamsky District
- Time zone: UTC+5:00

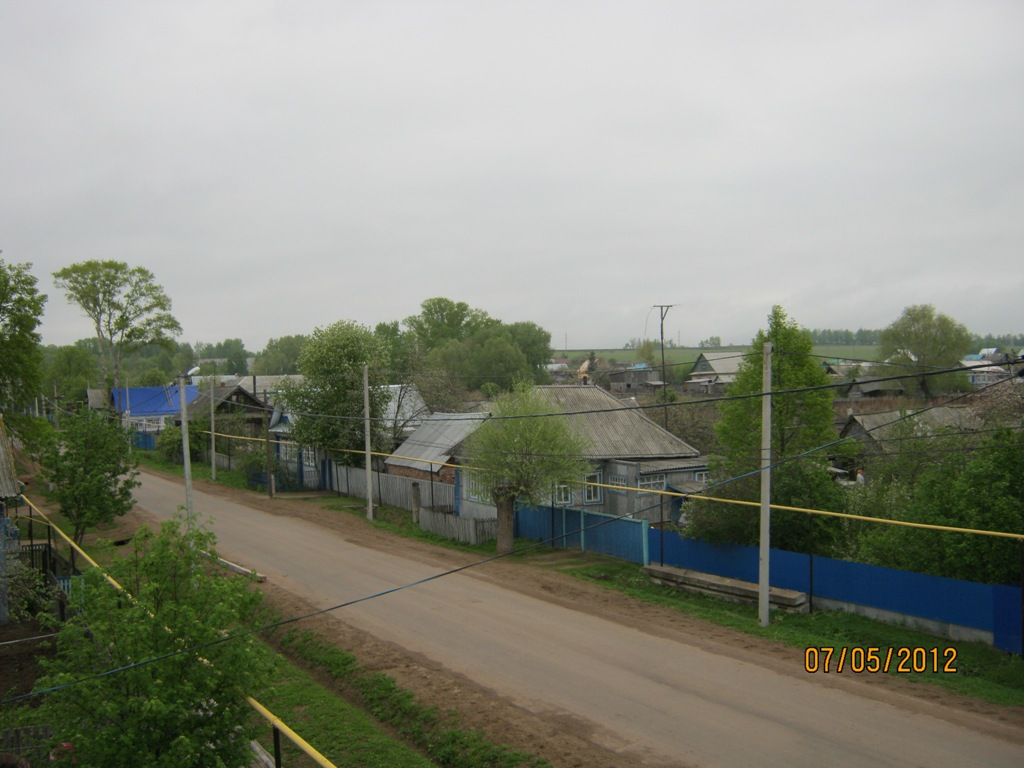

Novonagayevo (Russian: Новонагаево; Bashkir: Яңы Нуғай, Yañı Nuğay) is a rural locality (a selo) and the administrative centre of Novonagayevsky Selsoviet, Krasnokamsky District, Bashkortostan, Russia. The population was 1,093 as of 2010. There are 17 streets.

== Geography ==
Novonagayevo is located 28 km south of Nikolo-Beryozovka (the district's administrative centre) by road. Novy Aktanyshbash is the nearest rural locality.
