= Novy Burtyuk =

Novy Burtyuk Новый Буртюк
- Village
- Location within Bashkortostan Location within Russia
- Coordinates: 55°43′N 54°35′E
- Country: Russia
- Region: Bashkortostan
- District: Krasnokamsky District
- Time zone: UTC+5:00

Novy Burtyuk (Russian: Новый Буртюк; Bashkir: Яңы Бөртөк, Yañı Börtök) is a rural locality (a village) in Novoburinsky Selsoviet, Krasnokamsky District, Bashkortostan, Russia. The population was 527 as of 2010. There are 9 streets.

== Geography ==
Novy Burtyuk is located 60 km southeast of Nikolo-Beryozovka (the district's administrative centre) by road. Stary Burtyuk is the nearest rural locality.
