= Staryye Kazanchi =

Selo in Askinsky District, Bashkortostan, Russia

Staryye Kazanchi Старые Казанчи
- Selo
- Location within Bashkortostan Location within Russia
- Coordinates: 56°12′N 56°13′E
- Country: Russia
- Region: Bashkortostan
- District: Askinsky District
- Time zone: UTC+5:00

Staryye Kazanchi (Russian: Старые Казанчи; Bashkir: Иҫке Ҡаҙансы, İśke Qaźansı) is a rural locality (a selo) and the administrative center of Kazanchinsky Selsoviet, Askinsky District, Bashkortostan, Russia. The population was 631 as of 2010. There are 9 streets.

== Geography ==
Staryye Kazanchi is located 33 km northwest of Askino (the district's administrative centre) by road. Urmankül is the nearest rural locality.
