= Novy Suyush =

Village in Askinsky District, Bashkortostan, Russia

Novy Suyush Новый Суюш
- Village
- Location within Bashkortostan Location within Russia
- Coordinates: 56°00′N 56°59′E
- Country: Russia
- Region: Bashkortostan
- District: Askinsky District
- Time zone: UTC+5:00

Novy Suyush (Russian: Новый Суюш; Bashkir: Яңы Сөйөш, Yañı Söyöş) is a rural locality (a village) in Kashkinsky Selsoviet, Askinsky District, Bashkortostan, Russia. The population was 127 as of 2010. There are 6 streets.

== Geography ==
Novy Suyush is located 39 km southeast of Askino (the district's administrative centre) by road. Kashkino is the nearest rural locality.
