= Novaya Bura =

Novaya Bura Новая Бура
- Selo
- Location within Bashkortostan Location within Russia
- Coordinates: 55°46′N 54°35′E
- Country: Russia
- Region: Bashkortostan
- District: Krasnokamsky District
- Time zone: UTC+5:00

Novaya Bura (Russian: Новая Бура; Bashkir: Яңы Бура, Yañı Bura; Meadow Mari: Пура Ял, Pura Jal) is a rural locality (a selo) and the administrative centre of Novoburinsky Selsoviet, Krasnokamsky District, Bashkortostan, Russia. The population was 593 as of 2010. There are 7 streets.

== Geography ==
Novaya Bura is located 56 km southeast of Nikolo-Beryozovka (the district's administrative centre) by road. Staraya Bura and Kiremetevo are the nearest rural localities.
