= Kushkul =

Village in Askinsky District, Bashkortostan, Russia

Kushkul Кушкуль
- Village
- Location within Bashkortostan Location within Russia
- Coordinates: 56°01′N 56°25′E
- Country: Russia
- Region: Bashkortostan
- District: Askinsky District
- Time zone: UTC+5:00

Kushkul (Russian: Кушкуль; Bashkir: Ҡушкүл, Quşkül) is a rural locality (a village) in Yevbulyaksky Selsoviet, Askinsky District, Bashkortostan, Russia. The population was 20 as of 2010. There is 1 street.

== Geography ==
Kushkul is located 14 km southwest of Askino (the district's administrative centre) by road. Chyornoye Ozero is the nearest rural locality.
