= Chishma-Urakayevo =

Village in Askinsky District, Bashkortostan, Russia

Chishma-Urakayevo Чишма-Уракаево
- Village
- Location within Bashkortostan Location within Russia
- Coordinates: 55°54′N 56°23′E
- Country: Russia
- Region: Bashkortostan
- District: Askinsky District
- Time zone: UTC+5:00

Chishma-Urakayevo (Russian: Чишма-Уракаево; Bashkir: Шишмә-Ураҡай, Şişmä-Uraqay) is a rural locality (a village) in Arbashevsky Selsoviet, Askinsky District, Bashkortostan, Russia. The population was 245 as of 2010. There are 6 streets.

== Geography ==
Chishma-Urakayevo is located 28 km south of Askino (the district's administrative centre) by road. Arbashevo is the nearest rural locality.
