= Novy Yanzigit =

Novy Yanzigit Новый Янзигит
- Village
- Location within Bashkortostan Location within Russia
- Coordinates: 55°52′N 54°11′E
- Country: Russia
- Region: Bashkortostan
- District: Krasnokamsky District
- Time zone: UTC+5:00

Novy Yanzigit (Russian: Новый Янзигит; Bashkir: Яңы Йәнйегет, Yañı Yänyeget) is a rural locality (a village) and the administrative centre of Novoyanzigitovsky Selsoviet, Krasnokamsky District, Bashkortostan, Russia. The population was 316 as of 2010. There are 6 streets.

== Geography ==
Novy Yanzigit is located 41 km south of Nikolo-Beryozovka (the district's administrative centre) by road. Yanaul is the nearest rural locality.
