= Ulu-Yelga =

Village in Askinsky District, Bashkortostan, Russia

Ulu-Yelga Улу-Елга
- Village
- Location within Bashkortostan Location within Russia
- Coordinates: 56°21′N 56°21′E
- Country: Russia
- Region: Bashkortostan
- District: Askinsky District
- Time zone: UTC+5:00

Ulu-Yelga (Russian: Улу-Елга; Bashkir: Олойылға, Oloyılğa) is a rural locality (a village) in Askinsky District, Bashkortostan, Russia. The population was 136 as of 2010. There are three streets.

== Geography ==
Ulu-Yelga is located 51 km north of Askino (the district's administrative centre) by road. Bazanchatovo is the nearest rural locality.
