= Kshlau-Yelga =

Village in Askinsky District, Bashkortostan, Russia

Kshlau-Yelga Кшлау-Елга
- Village
- Location within Bashkortostan Location within Russia
- Coordinates: 56°17′N 56°20′E
- Country: Russia
- Region: Bashkortostan
- District: Askinsky District
- Time zone: UTC+5:00

Kshlau-Yelga (Russian: Кшлау-Елга; Bashkir: Ҡышлауйылға, Qışlawyılğa) is a rural locality (a village) in Askinsky District, Bashkortostan, Russia. The population was 345 as of 2010. There are 7 streets.

== Geography ==
Kshlau-Yelga is located 41 km northwest of Askino (the district's administrative centre) by road. Novye Kazanchi is the nearest rural locality.
