= Korolyovo =

Village in Askinsky District, Bashkortostan, Russia

Korolyovo Королёво
- Village
- Location within Bashkortostan Location within Russia
- Coordinates: 55°59′N 56°31′E
- Country: Russia
- Region: Bashkortostan
- District: Askinsky District
- Time zone: UTC+5:00

Korolyovo (Russian: Королёво) is a rural locality (a selo) in Yevbulyaksky Selsoviet, Askinsky District, Bashkortostan, Russia. The population was 54 as of 2010. There is 1 street.

== Geography ==
Korolyovo is located 15 km south of Askino (the district's administrative centre) by road. Yevbulyak is the nearest rural locality.
