= Dultsevka =

Village in Askinsky District, Bashkortostan, Russia

Dultsevka Дульцевка
- Village
- Location within Bashkortostan Location within Russia
- Coordinates: 56°05′N 57°00′E
- Country: Russia
- Region: Bashkortostan
- District: Askinsky District
- Time zone: UTC+5:00

Dultsevka (Russian: Дульцевка) is a rural locality (a village) in Urmiyazovsky Selsoviet, Askinsky District, Bashkortostan, Russia. The population was 26 as of 2010. There is 1 street.

== Geography ==
Dultsevka is located 35 km east of Askino (the district's administrative centre) by road. Urshady is the nearest rural locality.
