= Novyye Bagazy =

Village in Askinsky District, Bashkortostan, Russia

Novyye Bagazy Новые Багазы
- Village
- Location within Bashkortostan Location within Russia
- Coordinates: 56°00′N 56°42′E
- Country: Russia
- Region: Bashkortostan
- District: Askinsky District
- Time zone: UTC+5:00

Novyye Bagazy (Russian: Новые Багазы; Bashkir: Яңы Бағаҙы, Yañı Bağaźı) is a rural locality (a village) in Askinsky Selsoviet, Askinsky District, Bashkortostan, Russia. The population was 277 as of 2010. There are 6 streets.

== Geography ==
Novyye Bagazy is located 33 km southeast of Askino (the district's administrative centre) by road. Matala is the nearest rural locality.
