= Novy Tatysh =

Novy Tatysh Новый Татыш
- Village
- Location within Bashkortostan Location within Russia
- Coordinates: 55°47′N 54°19′E
- Country: Russia
- Region: Bashkortostan
- District: Krasnokamsky District
- Time zone: UTC+5:00

Novy Tatysh (Russian: Новый Татыш; Bashkir: Яңы Татыш, Yañı Tatış) is a rural locality (a village) in Novokainlykovsky Selsoviet, Krasnokamsky District, Bashkortostan, Russia. The population was 133 as of 2010. There are 2 streets.

== Geography ==
Novy Tatysh is located 70 km south of Nikolo-Beryozovka (the district's administrative centre) by road. Burnyush is the nearest rural locality.
