= Bazanchatovo =

Village in Askinsky District, Bashkortostan, Russia

Bazanchatovo Базанчатово
- Village
- Location within Bashkortostan Location within Russia
- Coordinates: 56°20′N 56°24′E
- Country: Russia
- Region: Bashkortostan
- District: Askinsky District
- Time zone: UTC+5:00

Bazanchatovo (Russian: Базанчатово; Bashkir: Баҙансат, Baźansat) is a rural locality (a village) in Askinsky District, Bashkortostan, Russia. The population was 245 as of 2010. There are 5 streets.

== Geography ==
Bazanchatovo is located 49 km north of Askino (the district's administrative centre) by road. Ulu-Yelga is the nearest rural locality.
