= Kuvakino =

Kuvakino Кувакино
- Village
- Location within Bashkortostan Location within Russia
- Coordinates: 56°10′N 54°30′E
- Country: Russia
- Region: Bashkortostan
- District: Krasnokamsky District
- Time zone: UTC+5:00

Kuvakino (Russian: Кувакино) is a rural locality (a village) in Nikolsky Selsoviet, Krasnokamsky District, Bashkortostan, Russia. The population was 202 as of 2010. There are 4 streets.

== Geography ==
Kuvakino is located 27 km northeast of Nikolo-Beryozovka (the district's administrative centre) by road. Nikolskoye is the nearest rural locality.
