= Novokabanovo =

Novokabanovo Новокабаново
- Selo
- Location within Bashkortostan Location within Russia
- Coordinates: 55°55′N 53°55′E
- Country: Russia
- Region: Bashkortostan
- District: Krasnokamsky District
- Time zone: UTC+5:00

Novokabanovo (Russian: Новокабаново; Bashkir: Яңы Ҡабан, Yañı Qaban) is a rural locality (a selo) and the administrative centre of Novokabanovsky Selsoviet, Krasnokamsky District, Bashkortostan, Russia. The population was 926 as of 2010. There are 17 streets.

== Geography ==
Novokabanovo is located 46 km southwest of Nikolo-Beryozovka (the district's administrative centre) by road. Agidel is the nearest rural locality.
