= Urmiyazy =

Selo in Askinsky District, Bashkortostan, Russia

Urmiyazy Урмиязы
- Selo
- Location within Bashkortostan Location within Russia
- Coordinates: 56°05′N 56°53′E
- Country: Russia
- Region: Bashkortostan
- District: Askinsky District
- Time zone: UTC+5:00

Urmiyazy (Russian: Урмиязы; Bashkir: Урмияҙ, Urmiyaź) is a rural locality (a selo) and the administrative center of Urmiyazovsky Selsoviet, Askinsky District, Bashkortostan, Russia. The population was 583 as of 2010. There are 6 streets.

== Geography ==
Urmiyazy is located 24 km east of Askino (the district's administrative centre) by road. Novokochkildino is the nearest rural locality.
