= Bolshoye Ozero =

Village in Askinsky District, Bashkortostan, Russia

Bolshoye Ozero Большое Озеро
- Village
- Location within Bashkortostan Location within Russia
- Coordinates: 56°13′N 56°25′E
- Country: Russia
- Region: Bashkortostan
- District: Askinsky District
- Time zone: UTC+5:00

Bolshoye Ozero (Russian: Большое Озеро; Bashkir: Олокүл, Olokül) is a rural locality (a village) in Askinsky Selsoviet, Askinsky District, Bashkortostan, Russia. The population was 15 as of 2010. There are only 2 streets in the village.

== Geography ==
Bolshoye Ozero is by road 24 km northwest of Askino (the district's administrative centre). Tulguzbash is the nearest rural locality.
