= Klyuchevoy Log =

Selo in Askinsky District, Bashkortostan, Russia

Klyuchevoy Log Ключевой Лог
- Selo
- Location within Bashkortostan Location within Russia
- Coordinates: 56°11′N 57°15′E
- Country: Russia
- Region: Bashkortostan
- District: Askinsky District
- Time zone: UTC+5:00

Klyuchevoy Log (Russian: Ключевой Лог; Bashkir: Шишмәлеҡул, Şişmälequl) is a rural locality (a selo) in Kungakovsky Selsoviet, Askinsky District, Bashkortostan, Russia. The population was 29 as of 2010. There is 1 street.

== Geography ==
Klyuchevoy Log is located 53 km northeast of Askino (the district's administrative centre) by road. Tashlykul is the nearest rural locality.
