= Kirgizovo =

Kirgizovo Киргизово
- Village
- Location within Bashkortostan Location within Russia
- Coordinates: 55°46′N 54°21′E
- Country: Russia
- Region: Bashkortostan
- District: Krasnokamsky District
- Time zone: UTC+5:00

Kirgizovo (Russian: Киргизово; Bashkir: Ҡырғыҙ, Qırğıź) is a rural locality (a village) in Novokainlykovsky Selsoviet, Krasnokamsky District, Bashkortostan, Russia. The population was 124 as of 2010. There is 1 street.

== Geography ==
Kirgizovo is located 67 km south of Nikolo-Beryozovka (the district's administrative centre) by road. Burnyush is the nearest rural locality.
