= Ust-Tabaska =

Village in Askinsky District, Bashkortostan, Russia

Ust-Tabaska Усть-Табаска
- Village
- Location within Bashkortostan Location within Russia
- Coordinates: 56°07′N 57°27′E
- Country: Russia
- Region: Bashkortostan
- District: Askinsky District
- Time zone: UTC+5:00

Ust-Tabaska (Russian: Усть-Табаска; Bashkir: Табаҫҡытамаҡ, Tabaśqıtamaq) is a rural locality (a village) in Askinsky District, Bashkortostan, Russia. The population was 462 as of 2010. There are 8 streets.

== Geography ==
Ust-Tabaska is located 69 km east of Askino (the district's administrative centre) by road. Zaimka is the nearest rural locality.
