= Urshady =

Village in Askinsky District, Bashkortostan, Russia

Urshady Уршады
- Village
- Location within Bashkortostan Location within Russia
- Coordinates: 56°08′N 57°04′E
- Country: Russia
- Region: Bashkortostan
- District: Askinsky District
- Time zone: UTC+5:00

Urshady (Russian: Уршады; Bashkir: Үршиҙе, Ürşiźe) is a rural locality (a village) in Urmiyazovsky Selsoviet, Askinsky District, Bashkortostan, Russia. The population was 276 as of 2010. There are 7 streets.

== Geography ==
Urshady is located 41 km east of Askino (the district's administrative centre) by road. Russky Sars is the nearest rural locality.
