= Manyak =

Manyak Маняк
- Village
- Location within Bashkortostan Location within Russia
- Coordinates: 55°44′N 54°40′E
- Country: Russia
- Region: Bashkortostan
- District: Krasnokamsky District
- Time zone: UTC+5:00

Manyak (Russian: Маняк; Bashkir: Мәнәк, Mänäk) is a rural locality (a village) in Novoburinsky Selsoviet, Krasnokamsky District, Bashkortostan, Russia. The population was 281 as of 2010. There are 5 streets.

== Geography ==
Manyak is located 64 km southeast of Nikolo-Beryozovka (the district's administrative centre) by road. Mryasovo is the nearest rural locality.
