= Ivanovka, Republic of Bashkortostan =

Ivanovka Ивановка
- Village
- Location within Bashkortostan Location within Russia
- Coordinates: 56°00′N 54°08′E
- Country: Russia
- Region: Bashkortostan
- District: Krasnokamsky District
- Time zone: UTC+5:00

Ivanovka (Russian: Ивановка) is a rural locality (a village) in Arlansky Selsoviet, Krasnokamsky District, Bashkortostan, Russia. The population was 13 as of 2010. There is 1 street.

== Geography ==
Ivanovka is located 26 km south of Nikolo-Beryozovka (the district's administrative centre) by road. Starourazayevo is the nearest rural locality.
