= Russkaya Kara =

Village in Askinsky District, Bashkortostan, Russia

Russkaya Kara Русская Кара
- Village
- Location within Bashkortostan Location within Russia
- Coordinates: 56°09′N 56°10′E
- Country: Russia
- Region: Bashkortostan
- District: Askinsky District
- Time zone: UTC+5:00

Russkaya Kara (Russian: Русская Кара; Bashkir: Урыҫ Ҡара, Urıś Qara) is a rural locality (a village) in Kazanchinsky Selsoviet, Askinsky District, Bashkortostan, Russia. The population was 3 as of 2010. There is 1 street.

== Geography ==
Russkaya Kara is located 42 km northwest of Askino (the district's administrative centre) by road. Mikhaylovka is the nearest rural locality.
