= Sauzovo =

Sauzovo Саузово
- Village
- Location within Bashkortostan Location within Russia
- Coordinates: 55°56′N 53°46′E
- Country: Russia
- Region: Bashkortostan
- District: Krasnokamsky District
- Time zone: UTC+5:00

Sauzovo (Russian: Саузово; Bashkir: Сауыҙ, Sawıź) is a rural locality (a village) in Sauzbashevsky Selsoviet, Krasnokamsky District, Bashkortostan, Russia. The population was 165 as of 2010. There are 10 streets.

== Geography ==
Sauzovo is located 60 km southwest of Nikolo-Beryozovka (the district's administrative centre) by road. Novokabanovo is the nearest rural locality.
