= Kungak =

Village in Askinsky District, Bashkortostan, Russia

Kungak Кунгак
- Village
- Location within Bashkortostan Location within Russia
- Coordinates: 56°12′N 57°18′E
- Country: Russia
- Region: Bashkortostan
- District: Askinsky District
- Time zone: UTC+5:00

Kungak (Russian: Кунгак; Bashkir: Көнгәк, Köngäk) is a rural locality (a village) and the administrative center of Kungakovsky Selsoviet, Askinsky District, Bashkortostan, Russia. The population was 602 as of 2010. There are 6 streets.

== Geography ==
Kungak is located 57 km northeast of Askino (the district's administrative centre) by road. Klyuchevoy Log is the nearest rural locality.
