= Kuperbash =

Kuperbash Купербаш
- Village
- Location within Bashkortostan Location within Russia
- Coordinates: 55°51′N 54°28′E
- Country: Russia
- Region: Bashkortostan
- District: Krasnokamsky District
- Time zone: UTC+5:00

Kuperbash (Russian: Купербаш; Bashkir: Күпербаш, Küperbaş) is a rural locality (a village) in Novokainlykovsky Selsoviet, Krasnokamsky District, Bashkortostan, Russia. The population was 95 as of 2010. There is 1 street.

== Geography ==
Kuperbash is located 44 km southeast of Nikolo-Beryozovka (the district's administrative centre) by road. Sharipovskogo uchastka is the nearest rural locality.
