= Kaltayevo =

Kaltayevo Калтаево
- Village
- Location within Bashkortostan Location within Russia
- Coordinates: 56°08′N 54°16′E
- Country: Russia
- Region: Bashkortostan
- District: Krasnokamsky District
- Time zone: UTC+5:00

Kaltayevo (Russian: Калтаево; Bashkir: Ҡалтай, Qaltay) is a rural locality (a village) in Muzyakovsky Selsoviet, Krasnokamsky District, Bashkortostan, Russia. The population was 124 as of 2010. There are 5 streets.

== Geography ==
Kaltayevo is located 24 km northeast of Nikolo-Beryozovka (the district's administrative centre) by road. Ishmetovo is the nearest rural locality.
