= Novy Chuganak =

Novy Chuganak Новый Чуганак
- Village
- Location within Bashkortostan Location within Russia
- Coordinates: 55°57′N 54°25′E
- Country: Russia
- Region: Bashkortostan
- District: Krasnokamsky District
- Time zone: UTC+5:00

Novy Chuganak (Russian: Новый Чуганак; Bashkir: Яңы Суғанаҡ, Yañı Suğanaq) is a rural locality (a village) in Kariyevsky Selsoviet, Krasnokamsky District, Bashkortostan, Russia. The population was 68 as of 2010. There are 4 streets.

== Geography ==
Novy Chuganak is located 32 km southeast of Nikolo-Beryozovka (the district's administrative centre) by road. Grafskoye is the nearest rural locality.
