= Gumbino =

Village in Askinsky District, Bashkortostan, Russia

Gumbino Гумбино
- Village
- Location within Bashkortostan Location within Russia
- Coordinates: 55°59′N 57°03′E
- Country: Russia
- Region: Bashkortostan
- District: Askinsky District

Population (2010)
  - Total: 141
- Time zone: UTC+5:00

Gumbino (Russian: Гумбино; Bashkir: Гөмбә, Gömbä) is a rural locality (a village) in Kashkinsky Selsoviet, Askinsky District, Bashkortostan, Russia. The population was 141 as of 2010. There are 5 streets.

== Geography ==
Gumbino is located 44 km southeast of Askino (the district's administrative centre) by road. Kashkino is the nearest rural locality.
