= Yevbulyak =

Village in Askinsky District, Bashkortostan, Russia

Yevbulyak Евбуляк
- Village
- Location within Bashkortostan Location within Russia
- Coordinates: 55°59′N 56°30′E
- Country: Russia
- Region: Bashkortostan
- District: Askinsky District
- Time zone: UTC+5:00

Yevbulyak (Russian: Евбуляк; Bashkir: Яубүләк, Yawbüläk) is a rural locality (a village) and the administrative center of Yevbulyaksky Selsoviet, Askinsky District, Bashkortostan, Russia. The population was 86 as of 2010. There are 2 streets.

== Geography ==
Yevbulyak is located 13 km southwest of Askino (the district's administrative centre) by road. Korolyovo is the nearest rural locality.
