= Kutlinka =

Kutlinka Кутлинка
- Village
- Location within Bashkortostan Location within Russia
- Coordinates: 56°03′N 54°21′E
- Country: Russia
- Region: Bashkortostan
- District: Krasnokamsky District
- Time zone: UTC+5:00

Kutlinka (Russian: Кутлинка; Bashkir: Ҡотло, Qotlo) is a rural locality (a village) in Kariyevsky Selsoviet, Krasnokamsky District, Bashkortostan, Russia. The population was 233 as of 2010. There are 11 streets.

== Geography ==
Kutlinka is located 15 km southeast of Nikolo-Beryozovka (the district's administrative centre) by road. Neftekamsk is the nearest rural locality.
