= Mozhary =

Mozhary Можары
- Selo
- Location within Bashkortostan Location within Russia
- Coordinates: 55°57′N 54°15′E
- Country: Russia
- Region: Bashkortostan
- District: Krasnokamsky District
- Time zone: UTC+5:00

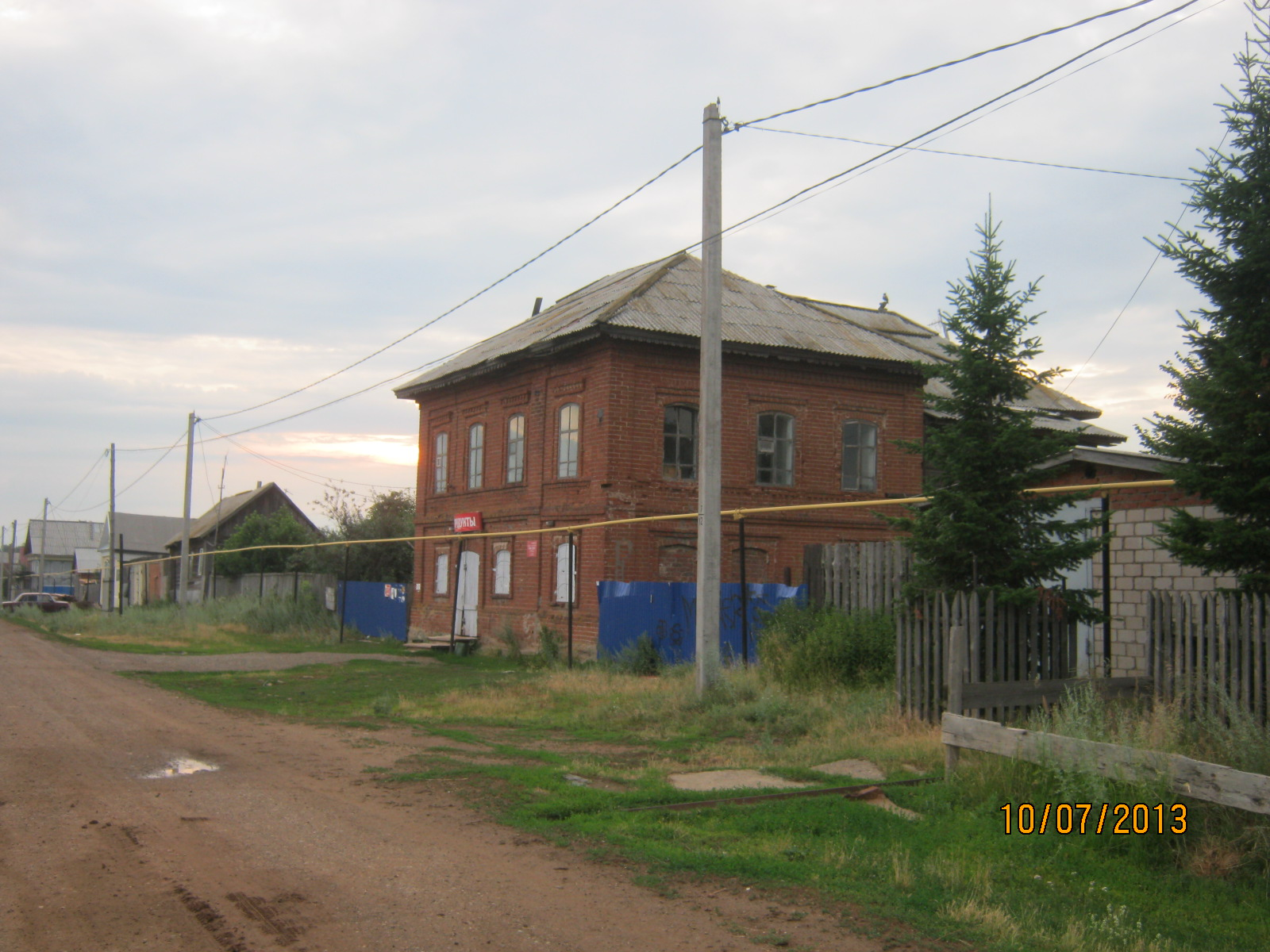
House in Mozhary

Mozhary (Russian: Можары; Bashkir: Можары, Mojarı) is a rural locality (a selo) in Arlansky Selsoviet, Krasnokamsky District, Bashkortostan, Russia. The population was 393 as of 2010. There are 6 streets.

== Geography ==
Mozhary is located 23 km south of Nikolo-Beryozovka (the district's administrative centre) by road. Arlan is the nearest rural locality.
