= Novy Kartkisyak =

Village in Askinsky District, Bashkortostan, Russia

Novy Kartkisyak Новый Карткисяк
- Village
- Location within Bashkortostan Location within Russia
- Coordinates: 55°58′N 56°31′E
- Country: Russia
- Region: Bashkortostan
- District: Askinsky District
- Time zone: UTC+5:00

Novy Kartkisyak (Russian: Новый Карткисяк; Bashkir: Яңы Ҡарткиҫәк, Yañı Qartkiśäk) is a rural locality (a village) in Yevbulyaksky Selsoviet, Askinsky District, Bashkortostan, Russia. The population was 58 as of 2010. There is 1 street.

== Geography ==
Novy Kartkisyak is located 17 km south of Askino (the district's administrative centre) by road. Yevbulyak is the nearest rural locality.
