= Chad, Askinsky District, Bashkortostan =

Village in Askinsky District, Bashkortostan, Russia

Chad Чад
- Village
- Location within Bashkortostan Location within Russia
- Coordinates: 56°13′N 56°19′E
- Country: Russia
- Region: Bashkortostan
- District: Askinsky District
- Time zone: UTC+5:00

Chad (Russian: Чад; Bashkir: Сат, Sat) is a rural locality (a village) in Mutabashevsky Selsoviet, Askinsky District, Bashkortostan, Russia. The population was 44 as of 2010. There is 1 street.

== Geography ==
Chad is located 30 km northwest of Askino (the district's administrative centre) by road. Muta-Yelga is the nearest rural locality.
