= Chabayevka =

Chabayevka Чабаевка
- Village
- Location within Bashkortostan Location within Russia
- Coordinates: 55°52′N 54°28′E
- Country: Russia
- Region: Bashkortostan
- District: Krasnokamsky District
- Time zone: UTC+5:00

Chabayevka (Russian: Чабаевка; Bashkir: Сабай, Sabay) is a rural locality (a village) in Shushnursky Selsoviet, Krasnokamsky District, Bashkortostan, Russia. The population was 17 as of 2010. There is 1 street.

== Geography ==
Chabayevka is located 45 km southeast of Nikolo-Beryozovka (the district's administrative centre) by road. Nizhnyaya Tatya is the nearest rural locality.
