= Bachkitau =

Bachkitau Бачкитау
- Village
- Location within Bashkortostan Location within Russia
- Coordinates: 55°50′N 54°03′E
- Country: Russia
- Region: Bashkortostan
- District: Krasnokamsky District
- Time zone: UTC+5:00

Bachkitau (Russian: Бачкитау; Bashkir: Баҫҡытау, Baśqıtaw) is a rural locality (a village) in Novoyanzigitovsky Selsoviet, Krasnokamsky District, Bashkortostan, Russia. The population was 270 as of 2010. There are 4 streets.

== Geography ==
Bachkitau is located 51 km south of Nikolo-Beryozovka (the district's administrative centre) by road. Staroyanzigitovo is the nearest rural locality.
