= Baryazibash =

Baryazibash Барьязибаш
- Village
- Location within Bashkortostan Location within Russia
- Coordinates: 55°50′N 54°32′E
- Country: Russia
- Region: Bashkortostan
- District: Krasnokamsky District
- Time zone: UTC+5:00

Baryazibash (Russian: Барьязибаш; Bashkir: Баръяҙыбаш, Baryaźıbaş) is a rural locality (a village) in Kuyanovsky Selsoviet, Krasnokamsky District, Bashkortostan, Russia. The population was 202 as of 2010. There are 3 streets.

== Geography ==
Baryazibash is located 52 km southeast of Nikolo-Beryozovka (the district's administrative centre) by road. Redkino is the nearest rural locality.
