= Tulguzbash =

Village in Askinsky District, Bashkortostan, Russia

Tulguzbash Тульгузбаш
- Village
- Location within Bashkortostan Location within Russia
- Coordinates: 56°14′N 56°29′E
- Country: Russia
- Region: Bashkortostan
- District: Askinsky District
- Time zone: UTC+5:00

Tulguzbash (Russian: Тульгузбаш; Bashkir: Төлгөҙбаш, Tölgöźbaş) is a rural locality (a village) in Askinsky Selsoviet, Askinsky District, Bashkortostan, Russia. The population was 265 as of 2010. There are 6 streets.

== Geography ==
Tulguzbash is located 19 km north of Askino (the district's administrative centre) by road. Bolshoye Ozero is the nearest rural locality.
