= Taktalachuk =

Taktalachuk Такталачук
- Village
- Location within Bashkortostan Location within Russia
- Coordinates: 55°52′N 54°40′E
- Country: Russia
- Region: Bashkortostan
- District: Krasnokamsky District
- Time zone: UTC+5:00

Taktalachuk (Russian: Такталачук; Bashkir: Таҡталасыҡ, Taqtalasıq) is a rural locality (a village) in Kuyanovsky Selsoviet, Krasnokamsky District, Bashkortostan, Russia. The population was 25 as of 2010. There are 2 streets.

== Geography ==
Taktalachuk is located 61 km southeast of Nikolo-Beryozovka (the district's administrative centre) by road. Stary Ashit is the nearest rural locality.
