= Kuyanovo, Krasnokamsky District, Republic of Bashkortostan =

Kuyanovo Куяново
- Selo
- Location within Bashkortostan Location within Russia
- Coordinates: 55°48′N 54°32′E
- Country: Russia
- Region: Bashkortostan
- District: Krasnokamsky District
- Time zone: UTC+5:00

Kuyanovo (Russian: Куяново; Bashkir: Ҡуян, Quyan) is a rural locality (a selo) and the administrative centre of Kuyanovsky Selsoviet, Krasnokamsky District, Bashkortostan, Russia. The population was 3,664 as of 2010. There are 23 streets.

== Geography ==
Kuyanovo is located 51 km southeast of Nikolo-Beryozovka (the district's administrative centre) by road. Redkino is the nearest rural locality.
