= Tashlykul =

Village in Askinsky District, Bashkortostan, Russia

Tashlykul Ташлыкуль
- Village
- Location within Bashkortostan Location within Russia
- Coordinates: 56°09′N 57°14′E
- Country: Russia
- Region: Bashkortostan
- District: Askinsky District
- Time zone: UTC+5:00

Tashlykul (Russian: Ташлыкуль; Bashkir: Ташлыкүл, Taşlıkül) is a rural locality (a village) in Kungakovsky Selsoviet, Askinsky District, Bashkortostan, Russia. The population was 26 as of 2010. There is 1 street.

== Geography ==
Tashlykul is located 51 km east of Askino (the district's administrative centre) by road. Klyuchevoy Log is the nearest rural locality.
