= Staraya Mushta =

Staraya Mushta Старая Мушта
- Selo
- Location within Bashkortostan Location within Russia
- Coordinates: 55°48′N 54°14′E
- Country: Russia
- Region: Bashkortostan
- District: Krasnokamsky District
- Time zone: UTC+5:00

Staraya Mushta (Russian: Старая Мушта; Bashkir: Иҫке Мошто, İśke Moşto) is a rural locality (a selo) in Novoyanzigitovsky Selsoviet, Krasnokamsky District, Bashkortostan, Russia. The population was 563 in 2010. There are seven streets.

== Geography ==
Staraya Mushta is located 50 kilometres (31 mi) south of Nikolo-Beryozovka (the district's administrative centre) by road. Novy Yanzigit is the nearest rural locality.
