= Novyye Kazanchi =

Village in Askinsky District, Bashkortostan, Russia

Novyye Kazanchi Новые Казанчи
- Village
- Location within Bashkortostan Location within Russia
- Coordinates: 56°16′N 56°16′E
- Country: Russia
- Region: Bashkortostan
- District: Askinsky District
- Time zone: UTC+5:00

Novyye Kazanchi (Russian: Новые Казанчи; Bashkir: Яңы Ҡаҙансы, Yañı Qaźansı) is a rural locality (a village) in Askinsky District, Bashkortostan, Russia. The population was 443 as of 2010. There are 8 streets.

== Geography ==
Novyye Kazanchi is located 46 km northwest of Askino (the district's administrative centre) by road. Kshlau-Yelga is the nearest rural locality.
