= Tyuysk =

Village in Askinsky District, Bashkortostan, Russia

Tyuysk Тюйск
- Village
- Location within Bashkortostan Location within Russia
- Coordinates: 56°15′N 56°37′E
- Country: Russia
- Region: Bashkortostan
- District: Askinsky District
- Time zone: UTC+5:00

Tyuysk (Russian: Тюйск; Bashkir: Төй, Töy) is a rural locality (a village) in Askinsky Selsoviet, Askinsky District, Bashkortostan, Russia. The population was 257 as of 2010. There are 8 streets.

== Geography ==
Tyuysk is located 26 km south of Askino (the district's administrative centre) by road. Talog is the nearest rural locality.
