= Nizhnyaya Tatya =

Nizhnyaya Tatya Нижняя Татья
- Selo
- Location within Bashkortostan Location within Russia
- Coordinates: 55°54′N 54°26′E
- Country: Russia
- Region: Bashkortostan
- District: Krasnokamsky District
- Time zone: UTC+5:00

Nizhnyaya Tatya (Russian: Нижняя Татья; Bashkir: Түбән Таҡыя, Tübän Taqıya) is a rural locality (a selo) in Shushnursky Selsoviet, Krasnokamsky District, Bashkortostan, Russia. The population was 235 as of 2010. There are 5 streets.

== Geography ==
Nizhnyaya Tatya is located 42 km southeast of Nikolo-Beryozovka (the district's administrative centre) by road. Grafskoye is the nearest rural locality.
