= Muta-Yelga =

Village in Askinsky District, Bashkortostan, Russia

Muta-Yelga Мута-Елга
- Village
- Location within Bashkortostan Location within Russia
- Coordinates: 56°12′N 56°20′E
- Country: Russia
- Region: Bashkortostan
- District: Askinsky District
- Time zone: UTC+5:00

Muta-Yelga (Russian: Мута-Елга; Bashkir: Мутайылға, Mutayılğa) is a rural locality (a village) in Mutabashevsky Selsoviet, Askinsky District, Bashkortostan, Russia. The population was 237 as of 2010. There are 5 streets.

== Geography ==
Muta-Yelga is located 27 km northwest of Askino (the district's administrative centre) by road. Chad is the nearest rural locality.
