= Urmankul =

Village in Askinsky District, Bashkortostan, Russia

Urmankul Урманкуль
- Village
- Location within Bashkortostan Location within Russia
- Coordinates: 56°13′N 56°11′E
- Country: Russia
- Region: Bashkortostan
- District: Askinsky District
- Time zone: UTC+5:00

Urmankul (Russian: Урманкуль; Bashkir: Урманкүл, Urmankül) is a rural locality (a village) in Kazanchinsky Selsoviet, Askinsky District, Bashkortostan, Russia. The population was 147 as of 2010. There are 3 streets.

== Geography ==
Urmankul is located 36 km northwest of Askino (the district's administrative centre) by road. Starye Kazanchi is the nearest rural locality.
