= Derevnya Sharipovskogo uchastka =

Derevnya Sharipovskogo uchastka Деревня Шариповского участка
- Village
- Location within Bashkortostan Location within Russia
- Coordinates: 55°50′N 54°27′E
- Country: Russia
- Region: Bashkortostan
- District: Krasnokamsky District
- Time zone: UTC+5:00

Derevnya Sharipovskogo uchastka (Russian: Деревня Шариповского участка; Bashkir: Шәрип участкаһы, Şärip uçastkahı) is a rural locality (a village) in Novokainlykovsky Selsoviet, Krasnokamsky District, Bashkortostan, Russia. The population was 117 as of 2010. There are 2 streets.

== Geography ==
The village is located 43 km southeast of Nikolo-Beryozovka (the district's administrative centre) by road. Kuperbash is the nearest rural locality.
