= Kuyashtyr =

Selo in Askinsky District, Bashkortostan, Russia

Kuyashtyr Куяштыр
- Selo
- Location within Bashkortostan Location within Russia
- Coordinates: 56°01′N 56°34′E
- Country: Russia
- Region: Bashkortostan
- District: Askinsky District
- Time zone: UTC+5:00

Kuyashtyr (Russian: Куяштыр; Bashkir: Ҡуяштыр, Quyaştır) is a rural locality (a selo) and the administrative center of Askinsky Selsoviet, Askinsky District, Bashkortostan, Russia. The population was 322 as of 2010. There are 9 streets.

== Geography ==
Kuyashtyr is located 8 km south of Askino (the district's administrative centre) by road. Korolyovo is the nearest rural locality.
