= Murzino, Krasnokamsky District, Republic of Bashkortostan =

Murzino Мурзино
- Village
- Location within Bashkortostan Location within Russia
- Coordinates: 56°09′N 54°22′E
- Country: Russia
- Region: Bashkortostan
- District: Krasnokamsky District
- Time zone: UTC+5:00

Murzino (Russian: Мурзино; Bashkir: Мырҙа, Mırźa) is a rural locality (a village) in Razdolyevsky Selsoviet, Krasnokamsky District, Bashkortostan, Russia. The population was 46 as of 2010. There are 6 streets.

== Geography ==
Murzino is located 19 km northeast of Nikolo-Beryozovka (the district's administrative centre) by road. Muzyak is the nearest rural locality.
