= Sabanchi, Krasnokamsky District, Republic of Bashkortostan =

Sabanchi Сабанчи
- Village
- Location within Bashkortostan Location within Russia
- Coordinates: 55°49′N 54°24′E
- Country: Russia
- Region: Bashkortostan
- District: Krasnokamsky District
- Time zone: UTC+5:00

Sabanchi (Russian: Сабанчи; Bashkir: Һабансы, Habansı) is a rural locality (a village) in Shushnursky Selsoviet, Krasnokamsky District, Bashkortostan, Russia. The population was 21 as of 2010. There is 1 street.

== Geography ==
Sabanchi is located 76 km southeast of Nikolo-Beryozovka (the district's administrative centre) by road. Yanaul is the nearest rural locality.
