= Novobaltachevo, Krasnokamsky District, Republic of Bashkortostan =

Novobaltachevo Новобалтачево
- Village
- Location within Bashkortostan Location within Russia
- Coordinates: 55°45′N 54°39′E
- Country: Russia
- Region: Bashkortostan
- District: Krasnokamsky District
- Time zone: UTC+5:00

Novobaltachevo (Russian: Новобалтачево; Bashkir: Яңы Балтас, Yañı Baltas) is a rural locality (a village) in Arlansky Selsoviet, Krasnokamsky District, Bashkortostan, Russia. The population was 30 as of 2010. There is 1 street.

== Geography ==
Novobaltachevo is located 25 m south of Nikolo-Beryozovka (the district's administrative centre) by road.
