= Stary Ashit =

Stary Ashit Старый Ашит
- Village
- Location within Bashkortostan Location within Russia
- Coordinates: 55°53′N 54°38′E
- Country: Russia
- Region: Bashkortostan
- District: Krasnokamsky District
- Time zone: UTC+5:00

Stary Ashit (Russian: Старый Ашит; Bashkir: Иҫке Әшит, İśke Äşit) is a rural locality (a village) in Kuyanovsky Selsoviet, Krasnokamsky District, Bashkortostan, Russia. The population was 16 as of 2010. There is 1 street.

== Geography ==
Stary Ashit is located 61 km southeast of Nikolo-Beryozovka (the district's administrative centre) by road. Taktalachuk is the nearest rural locality.
