= Ishmetovo =

Ishmetovo Ишметово
- Village
- Location within Bashkortostan Location within Russia
- Coordinates: 56°11′N 54°23′E
- Country: Russia
- Region: Bashkortostan
- District: Krasnokamsky District
- Time zone: UTC+5:00

Ishmetovo (Russian: Ишметово; Bashkir: Ишмәт, İşmät) is a rural locality (a village) in Muzyakovsky Selsoviet, Krasnokamsky District, Bashkortostan, Russia. The population was 106 as of 2010. There are 5 streets.

== Geography ==
Ishmetovo is located 24 km northeast of Nikolo-Beryozovka (the district's administrative centre) by road. Kaltayevo is the nearest rural locality.
