= Stepanovka, Askinsky District, Republic of Bashkortostan =

Village in Askinsky District, Bashkortostan, Russia

Stepanovka Степановка
- Village
- Location within Bashkortostan Location within Russia
- Coordinates: 55°59′N 56°17′E
- Country: Russia
- Region: Bashkortostan
- District: Askinsky District
- Time zone: UTC+5:00

Stepanovka (Russian: Степановка) is a rural locality (a village) in Klyuchevsky Selsoviet, Askinsky District, Bashkortostan, Russia. The population was 122 as of 2010. There is 1 street.

== Geography ==
Stepanovka is located 31 km southwest of Askino (the district's administrative centre) by road. Mishkino is the nearest rural locality.
