= Novourazayevo, Krasnokamsky District, Republic of Bashkortostan =

Novourazayevo Новоуразаево
- Village
- Location within Bashkortostan Location within Russia
- Coordinates: 56°00′N 54°12′E
- Country: Russia
- Region: Bashkortostan
- District: Krasnokamsky District
- Time zone: UTC+5:00

Novourazayevo (Russian: Новоуразаево; Bashkir: Яңы Уразай, Yañı Urazay) is a rural locality (a village) in Arlansky Selsoviet, Krasnokamsky District, Bashkortostan, Russia. The population was 184 as of 2010. There are 4 streets.

== Geography ==
Novourazayevo is located 32 km south of Nikolo-Beryozovka (the district's administrative centre) by road. Novobaltachevo is the nearest rural locality.
