= Kiremetovo =

Kiremetovo Киреметево
- Village
- Location within Bashkortostan Location within Russia
- Coordinates: 55°46′N 54°33′E
- Country: Russia
- Region: Bashkortostan
- District: Krasnokamsky District
- Time zone: UTC+5:00

Kiremetovo (Russian: Киреметево; Bashkir: Кирәмәт, Kirämät) is a rural locality (a village) in Novoburinsky Selsoviet, Krasnokamsky District, Bashkortostan, Russia. The population was 341 as of 2010. There are 5 streets.

== Geography ==
Kiremetovo is located 55 km southeast of Nikolo-Beryozovka (the district's administrative centre) by road. Kuyanovo is the nearest rural locality.
