= Vorobyovo, Republic of Bashkortostan =

Vorobyovo Воробьёво
- Village
- Location within Bashkortostan Location within Russia
- Coordinates: 56°08′N 54°16′E
- Country: Russia
- Region: Bashkortostan
- District: Krasnokamsky District
- Time zone: UTC+5:00

Vorobyovo (Russian: Воробьёво) is a rural locality (a village) in Muzyakovsky Selsoviet, Krasnokamsky District, Bashkortostan, Russia. The population was 214 as of 2010. There are 7 streets.

== Geography ==
Yenaktayevo is located 14 km east of Nikolo-Beryozovka (the district's administrative centre) by road. Neftekamsk is the nearest rural locality.
