= Yanguznarat =

Yanguznarat Янгузнарат
- Village
- Location within Bashkortostan Location within Russia
- Coordinates: 55°45′N 54°22′E
- Country: Russia
- Region: Bashkortostan
- District: Krasnokamsky District
- Time zone: UTC+5:00

Yanguznarat (Russian: Янгузнарат; Bashkir: Яңғыҙнарат, Yañğıźnarat) is a rural locality (a village) in Novokainlykovsky Selsoviet, Krasnokamsky District, Bashkortostan, Russia. The population was 136 as of 2010. There are 4 streets.

== Geography ==
Yanguznarat is located 61 km south of Nikolo-Beryozovka (the district's administrative centre) by road. Stary Kainlyk is the nearest rural locality.
