= Sultanbekovo =

Village in Askinsky District, Bashkortostan, Russia

Sultanbekovo Султанбеково
- Village
- Location within Bashkortostan Location within Russia
- Coordinates: 56°01′N 57°08′E
- Country: Russia
- Region: Bashkortostan
- District: Askinsky District
- Time zone: UTC+5:00

Sultanbekovo (Russian: Султанбеково; Bashkir: Солтанбәк, Soltanbäk) is a rural locality (a village) and the administrative center of Sultanbekovsky Selsoviet, Askinsky District, Bashkortostan, Russia. The population was 459 as of 2010. There are 10 streets.

== Geography ==
Sultanbekovo is located 54 km east of Askino (the district's administrative centre) by road. Churashevo is the nearest rural locality.
