= Stary Mutabash =

Selo in Askinsky District, Bashkortostan, Russia

Stary Mutabash Старый Мутабаш
- Selo
- Location within Bashkortostan Location within Russia
- Coordinates: 56°13′N 56°17′E
- Country: Russia
- Region: Bashkortostan
- District: Askinsky District
- Time zone: UTC+5:00

Stary Mutabash (Russian: Старый Мутабаш; Bashkir: Иҫке Мутабаш, İśke Mutabaş) is a rural locality (a selo) and the administrative center of Mutabashevsky Selsoviet, Askinsky District, Bashkortostan, Russia. The population was 218 as of 2010. There are 7 streets.

== Geography ==
Stary Mutabash is located 32 km northwest of Askino (the district's administrative centre) by road. Yanaul is the nearest rural locality.
