= Muzyak =

Muzyak Музяк
- Selo
- Location within Bashkortostan Location within Russia
- Coordinates: 56°10′N 54°22′E
- Country: Russia
- Region: Bashkortostan
- District: Krasnokamsky District
- Time zone: UTC+5:00

Muzyak (Russian: Музяк; Bashkir: Мүзәк, Müzäk) is a rural locality (a selo) and the administrative centre of Muzyakovsky Selsoviet, Krasnokamsky District, Bashkortostan, Russia. The population was 544 as of 2010. There are 6 streets.

== Geography ==
Muzyak is located 21 km northeast of Nikolo-Beryozovka (the district's administrative centre) by road. Murzino is the nearest rural locality.
