= Novy Kainlyk =

Novy Kainlyk Новый Каинлык
- Selo
- Location within Bashkortostan Location within Russia
- Coordinates: 55°47′N 54°29′E
- Country: Russia
- Region: Bashkortostan
- District: Krasnokamsky District
- Time zone: UTC+5:00

Novy Kainlyk (Russian: Новый Каинлык; Bashkir: Яңы Ҡайынлыҡ, Yañı Qayınlıq) is a rural locality (a selo) and the administrative centre of Novokainlykovsky Selsoviet, Krasnokamsky District, Bashkortostan, Russia. The population was 615 as of 2010. There are 5 streets.

== Geography ==
Novy Kainlyk is located 52 km southeast of Nikolo-Beryozovka (the district's administrative centre) by road. Redkino is the nearest rural locality.
