= Stary Kainlyk =

Stary Kainlyk Старый Каинлык
- Village
- Location within Bashkortostan Location within Russia
- Coordinates: 55°46′N 54°26′E
- Country: Russia
- Region: Bashkortostan
- District: Krasnokamsky District
- Time zone: UTC+5:00

Stary Kainlyk (Russian: Старый Каинлык; Bashkir: Иҫке Ҡайынлыҡ, İśke Qayınlıq) is a village located in Novokainlykovsky Selsoviet, Krasnokamsky District, Bashkortostan, Russia. The population was 128 as of 2010.

The village has 3 streets.

== Geography ==
Stary Kainlyk is located 58 km southeast of Nikolo-Beryozovka (the district's administrative centre) by road. Yanguznarat is the nearest rural locality.
