= Klyuchi, Askinsky District, Republic of Bashkortostan =

Selo in Askinsky District, Bashkortostan, Russia

Klyuchi Ключи
- Selo
- Location within Bashkortostan Location within Russia
- Coordinates: 55°59′N 56°22′E
- Country: Russia
- Region: Bashkortostan
- District: Askinsky District
- Time zone: UTC+5:00

Klyuchi (Russian: Ключи) is a rural locality (a selo) and the administrative center of Klyuchevsky Selsoviet, Askinsky District, Bashkortostan, Russia. The population was 170 as of 2010. There are six streets.

== Geography ==
Klyuchi is located 24 km southwest of Askino (the district's administrative centre) by road. Kuchanovo is the nearest rural locality.
