= Matala, Askinsky District, Republic of Bashkortostan =

Village in Askinsky District, Bashkortostan, Russia

Matala Матала
- Village
- Location within Bashkortostan Location within Russia
- Coordinates: 56°03′N 56°46′E
- Country: Russia
- Region: Bashkortostan
- District: Askinsky District
- Time zone: UTC+5:00

Matala (Russian: Матала; Bashkir: Мәтәле, Mätäle) is a rural locality (a village) in Kubiyazovsky Selsoviet, Askinsky District, Bashkortostan, Russia. The population was 56 as of 2010. There are 2 streets.

== Geography ==
Matala is located 22 km southeast of Askino (the district's administrative centre) by road. Utyashino is the nearest rural locality.
