= Tupraly =

Village in Askinsky District, Bashkortostan, Russia

Tupraly Тупралы
- Village
- Location within Bashkortostan Location within Russia
- Coordinates: 56°14′N 56°18′E
- Country: Russia
- Region: Bashkortostan
- District: Askinsky District
- Time zone: UTC+5:00

Tupraly (Russian: Тупралы; Bashkir: Төпрәле, Töpräle) is a rural locality (a village) in Mutabashevsky Selsoviet, Askinsky District, Bashkortostan, Russia. The population was 41 as of 2010. There is 1 street.

== Geography ==
Tupraly is located 35 km northwest of Askino (the district's administrative centre) by road. Stary Mutabash is the nearest rural locality.
