= Kigazy =

Selo in Askinsky District, Bashkortostan, Russia

Kigazy Кигазы
- Selo
- Location within Bashkortostan Location within Russia
- Coordinates: 56°03′N 56°20′E
- Country: Russia
- Region: Bashkortostan
- District: Askinsky District
- Time zone: UTC+5:00

Kigazy (Russian: Кигазы; Bashkir: Ҡыйғаҙы, Qıyğaźı) is a rural locality (a selo) in Petropavlovsky Selsoviet, Askinsky District, Bashkortostan, Russia. The population was 468 as of 2010. There are 11 streets.

== Geography ==
Kigazy is located 17 km southwest of Askino (the district's administrative centre) by road. Davlyatovka is the nearest rural locality.
