= Mryasovo =

Mryasovo Мрясово
- Village
- Location within Bashkortostan Location within Russia
- Coordinates: 55°45′N 54°39′E
- Country: Russia
- Region: Bashkortostan
- District: Krasnokamsky District
- Time zone: UTC+5:00

Mryasovo (Russian: Мрясово; Bashkir: Мерәҫ, Meräś) is a rural locality (a village) in Novoburinsky Selsoviet, Krasnokamsky District, Bashkortostan, Russia. The population was 81 as of 2010. There are 3 streets.

== Geography ==
Mryasovo is located 60 km southeast of Nikolo-Beryozovka (the district's administrative centre) by road. Manyak is the nearest rural locality.
