= Novokochkildino =

Village in Askinsky District, Bashkortostan, Russia

Novokochkildino Новокочкильдино
- Village
- Location within Bashkortostan Location within Russia
- Coordinates: 56°07′N 56°15′E
- Country: Russia
- Region: Bashkortostan
- District: Askinsky District
- Time zone: UTC+5:00

Novokochkildino (Russian: Новокочкильдино; Bashkir: Яңы Күскилде, Yañı Küskilde) is a rural locality (a village) in Urmiyazovsky Selsoviet, Askinsky District, Bashkortostan, Russia. The population was 330 as of 2010. There are 4 streets.

== Geography ==
Novokochkildino is located 22 km east of Askino (the district's administrative centre) by road. Urmiyazy is the nearest rural locality.
