= Sultanay =

Village in Askinsky District, Bashkortostan, Russia

Sultanay Султанай
- Village
- Location within Bashkortostan Location within Russia
- Coordinates: 56°01′N 56°29′E
- Country: Russia
- Region: Bashkortostan
- District: Askinsky District
- Time zone: UTC+5:00

Sultanay (Russian: Султанай; Bashkir: Солтанай, Soltanay) is a rural locality (a village) in Yevbulyaksky Selsoviet, Askinsky District, Bashkortostan, Russia. The population was 243 as of 2010. There are 3 streets.

== Geography ==
Sultanay is located 10 km southwest of Askino (the district's administrative centre) by road. Kushkul is the nearest rural locality.
