= Starokochkildino =

Village in Askinsky District, Bashkortostan, Russia

Starokochkildino Старокочкильдино
- Village
- Location within Bashkortostan Location within Russia
- Coordinates: 56°05′N 56°51′E
- Country: Russia
- Region: Bashkortostan
- District: Askinsky District
- Time zone: UTC+5:00

Starokochkildino (Russian: Старокочкильдино; Bashkir: Иҫке Күскилде, İśke Küskilde) is a rural locality (a village) in Urmiyazovsky Selsoviet, Askinsky District, Bashkortostan, Russia. The population was 274 as of 2010. There are 2 streets.

== Geography ==
Starokochkildino is located 22 km east of Askino (the district's administrative centre) by road. Novokochkildino is the nearest rural locality.
