= Barakhayevka =

Village in Askinsky District, Bashkortostan, Russia

Barakhayevka Барахаевка
- Village
- Location within Bashkortostan Location within Russia
- Coordinates: 56°08′N 56°33′E
- Country: Russia
- Region: Bashkortostan
- District: Askinsky District
- Time zone: UTC+5:00

Barakhayevka (Russian: Барахаевка) is a rural locality (a village) in Askinsky Selsoviet, Askinsky District, Bashkortostan, Russia. The population was 124 as of 2010. There are 3 streets.

== Geography ==
Barakhayevka is located 7 km north of Askino (the district's administrative centre) by road. Askino is the nearest rural locality.
