= Verkhnenikolskoye =

Village in Askinsky District, Bashkortostan, Russia

Verkhnenikolskoye Верхненикольское
- Village
- Location within Bashkortostan Location within Russia
- Coordinates: 56°15′N 56°38′E
- Country: Russia
- Region: Bashkortostan
- District: Askinsky District
- Time zone: UTC+5:00

Verkhnenikolskoye (Russian: Верхненикольское) is a rural locality (a village) in Askinsky Selsoviet, Askinsky District, Bashkortostan, Russia. The population was 9 as of 2010. There is 1 street.

== Geography ==
Verkhnenikolskoye is located 29 km north of Askino (the district's administrative centre) by road. Tyuysk is the nearest rural locality.
