= Yerma-Yelan =

Village in Askinsky District, Bashkortostan, Russia

Yerma-Yelan Ерма-Елань
- Village
- Location within Bashkortostan Location within Russia
- Coordinates: 56°08′N 56°24′E
- Country: Russia
- Region: Bashkortostan
- District: Askinsky District
- Time zone: UTC+5:00

Yerma-Yelan (Russian: Ерма-Елань; Bashkir: Йырмаялан, Yırmayalan) is a rural locality (a village) in Petropavlovsky Selsoviet, Askinsky District, Bashkortostan, Russia. The population was 85 as of 2010. There are 2 streets.

== Geography ==
Yerma-Yelan is located 18 km northwest of Askino (the district's administrative centre) by road. Novy Kubiyaz is the nearest rural locality.
