= Churashevo =

Village in Askinsky District, Bashkortostan, Russia

Churashevo Чурашево
- Village
- Location within Bashkortostan Location within Russia
- Coordinates: 56°04′N 57°10′E
- Country: Russia
- Region: Bashkortostan
- District: Askinsky District
- Time zone: UTC+5:00

Churashevo (Russian: Чурашево; Bashkir: Сураш, Suraş) is a rural locality (a village) in Sultanbekovsky Selsoviet, Askinsky District, Bashkortostan, Russia. The population was 233 as of 2010. There are 4 streets.

== Geography ==
Churashevo is located 47 km east of Askino (the district's administrative centre) by road. Kamashady is the nearest rural locality.
