= Vash-Yazy =

Village in Askinsky District, Bashkortostan, Russia

Vash-Yazy Ваш-Язы
- Village
- Location within Bashkortostan Location within Russia
- Coordinates: 56°18′N 56°27′E
- Country: Russia
- Region: Bashkortostan
- District: Askinsky District
- Time zone: UTC+5:00

Vash-Yazy (Russian: Ваш-Язы; Bashkir: Вашъяҙы, Waşyaźı) is a rural locality (a village) in Askinsky District, Bashkortostan, Russia. The population was 16 as of 2010. There is 1 street.

== Geography ==
Vash-Yazy is located 49 km north of Askino (the district's administrative centre) by road. Kshlau-Yelga is the nearest rural locality.
