= Karyakino =

Karyakino Карякино
- Village
- Location within Bashkortostan Location within Russia
- Coordinates: 56°09′N 54°17′E
- Country: Russia
- Region: Bashkortostan
- District: Krasnokamsky District
- Time zone: UTC+5:00

Karyakino (Russian: Карякино) is a rural locality (a village) in Muzyakovsky Selsoviet, Krasnokamsky District, Bashkortostan, Russia. The population was 130 as of 2010. There are 6 streets.

== Geography ==
Karyakino is located 17 km northeast of Nikolo-Beryozovka (the district's administrative centre) by road. Vorobyovo is the nearest rural locality.
