= Sauzbash =

Sauzbash Саузбаш
- Village
- Location within Bashkortostan Location within Russia
- Coordinates: 55°59′N 53°55′E
- Country: Russia
- Region: Bashkortostan
- District: Krasnokamsky District
- Time zone: UTC+5:00

Sauzbash (Russian: Саузбаш; Bashkir: Сауыҙбаш, Sawıźbaş) is a rural locality (a village) and the administrative centre of Sauzbashevsky Selsoviet, Krasnokamsky District, Bashkortostan, Russia. The population was 454 as of 2010. There are 9 streets.

== Geography ==
Sauzbash is located 46 km southwest of Nikolo-Beryozovka (the district's administrative centre) by road. Saklovo is the nearest rural locality.
