= Staraya Bura =

Staraya Bura Старая Бура
- Village
- Location within Bashkortostan Location within Russia
- Coordinates: 55°45′N 54°34′E
- Country: Russia
- Region: Bashkortostan
- District: Krasnokamsky District
- Time zone: UTC+5:00

Staraya Bura (Russian: Старая Бура; Bashkir: Иҫке Бура, İśke Bura) is a rural locality (a village) in Novoburinsky Selsoviet, Krasnokamsky District, Bashkortostan, Russia. The population was 251 as of 2010. There are 3 streets.

== Geography ==
Staraya Bura is located 58 km southeast of Nikolo-Beryozovka (the district's administrative centre) by road. Novaya Bura is the nearest rural locality.
