= Biktimirovo =

Biktimirovo Биктимирово
- Village
- Location within Bashkortostan Location within Russia
- Coordinates: 56°11′N 54°34′E
- Country: Russia
- Region: Bashkortostan
- District: Krasnokamsky District
- Time zone: UTC+5:00

Biktimirovo (Russian: Биктимирово; Bashkir: Биктимер, Biktimer) is a rural locality (a village) in Nikolsky Selsoviet, Krasnokamsky District, Bashkortostan, Russia. The population was 6 as of 2010. There is 1 street.

== Geography ==
Biktimirovo is located 30 km northeast of Nikolo-Beryozovka (the district's administrative centre) by road. Nikolskoye is the nearest rural locality.
