= Razdolye, Krasnokamsky District, Republic of Bashkortostan =

Razdolye Раздолье
- Village
- Location within Bashkortostan Location within Russia
- Coordinates: 56°08′N 54°24′E
- Country: Russia
- Region: Bashkortostan
- District: Krasnokamsky District
- Time zone: UTC+5:00

Razdolye (Russian: Раздолье) is a rural locality (a village) and the administrative centre of Razdolyevsky Selsoviet, Krasnokamsky District, Bashkortostan, Russia. The population was 1,084 as of 2010. There are 20 streets.

== Geography ==
Razdolye is located 19 km east of Nikolo-Beryozovka (the district's administrative centre) by road. Kadrekovo is the nearest rural locality.
