= Kashkino =

Selo in Askinsky District, Bashkortostan, Russia

Kashkino Кашкино
- Selo
- Location within Bashkortostan Location within Russia
- Coordinates: 56°01′N 56°59′E
- Country: Russia
- Region: Bashkortostan
- District: Askinsky District
- Time zone: UTC+5:00

Kashkino (Russian: Кашкино; Bashkir: Ҡашҡа, Qaşqa) is a rural locality (a selo) and the administrative center of Kashkinsky Selsoviet, Askinsky District, Bashkortostan, Russia. The population was 843 as of 2010. There are 12 streets.

== Geography ==
Kashkino is located 37 km southeast of Askino (the district's administrative centre) by road. Novy Suyush is the nearest rural locality.
