= Yanaul, Askinsky District, Republic of Bashkortostan =

Village in Askinsky District, Bashkortostan, Russia

Yanaul Янаул
- Village
- Location within Bashkortostan Location within Russia
- Coordinates: 56°12′N 56°16′E
- Country: Russia
- Region: Bashkortostan
- District: Askinsky District
- Time zone: UTC+5:00

Yanaul (Russian: Янаул; Bashkir: Яңауыл, Yañawıl) is a rural locality (a village) in Mutabashevsky Selsoviet, Askinsky District, Bashkortostan, Russia. The population was 53 as of 2010. There is 1 street.

== Geography ==
Yanaul is located 32 km northwest of Askino (the district's administrative centre) by road. Stary Mutabash is the nearest rural locality.
