= Novaya Burma =

Selo in Askinsky District, Bashkortostan, Russia

Novaya Burma Новая Бурма
- Selo
- Location within Bashkortostan Location within Russia
- Coordinates: 56°09′N 56°40′E
- Country: Russia
- Region: Bashkortostan
- District: Askinsky District
- Time zone: UTC+5:00

Novaya Burma (Russian: Новая Бурма; Bashkir: Яңы Борма, Yañı Borma) is a rural locality (a selo) in Askinsky Selsoviet, Askinsky District, Bashkortostan, Russia. The population was 189 as of 2010. There are 5 streets.

== Geography ==
Novaya Burma is located 10 km northeast of Askino (the district's administrative centre) by road. Avaday is the nearest rural locality.
