= Yankisyak =

Village in Askinsky District, Bashkortostan, Russia

Yankisyak Янкисяк
- Village
- Location within Bashkortostan Location within Russia
- Coordinates: 56°10′N 56°19′E
- Country: Russia
- Region: Bashkortostan
- District: Askinsky District
- Time zone: UTC+5:00

Yankisyak (Russian: Янкисяк; Bashkir: Йәнкиҫәк, Yänkiśäk) is a rural locality (a village) in Mutabashevsky Selsoviet, Askinsky District, Bashkortostan, Russia. The population was 47 as of 2010. There is 1 street.

== Geography ==
Yankisyak is located 26 km northwest of Askino (the district's administrative centre) by road. Muta-Yelga is the nearest rural locality.
