= Talog =

Talog may refer to:

== Places ==
- Talog, Russia, a rural locality in Askinsky District, Bashkortostan, Russia
- Talog, Carmarthenshire, a community in Carmarthenshire, Wales
- Talog Gewog, a gewog (village block) in Punakha District, Bhutan

== People with the name ==
- Myfanwy Talog (1944-1995), Welsh actress
