= Kuchanovo =

Village in Askinsky District, Bashkortostan, Russia

Kuchanovo Кучаново
- Village
- Location within Bashkortostan Location within Russia
- Coordinates: 55°57′N 56°25′E
- Country: Russia
- Region: Bashkortostan
- District: Askinsky District
- Time zone: UTC+5:00

Kuchanovo (Russian: Кучаново; Bashkir: Күсән, Küsän) is a rural locality (a village) in Klyuchevsky Selsoviet, Askinsky District, Bashkortostan, Russia. The population was 127 as of 2010. There are 3 streets.

== Geography ==
Kuchanovo is located 22 km southwest of Askino (the district's administrative centre) by road. Klyuchi is the nearest rural locality.
