= Novy Aktanyshbash =

Novy Aktanyshbash Новый Актанышбаш
- Selo
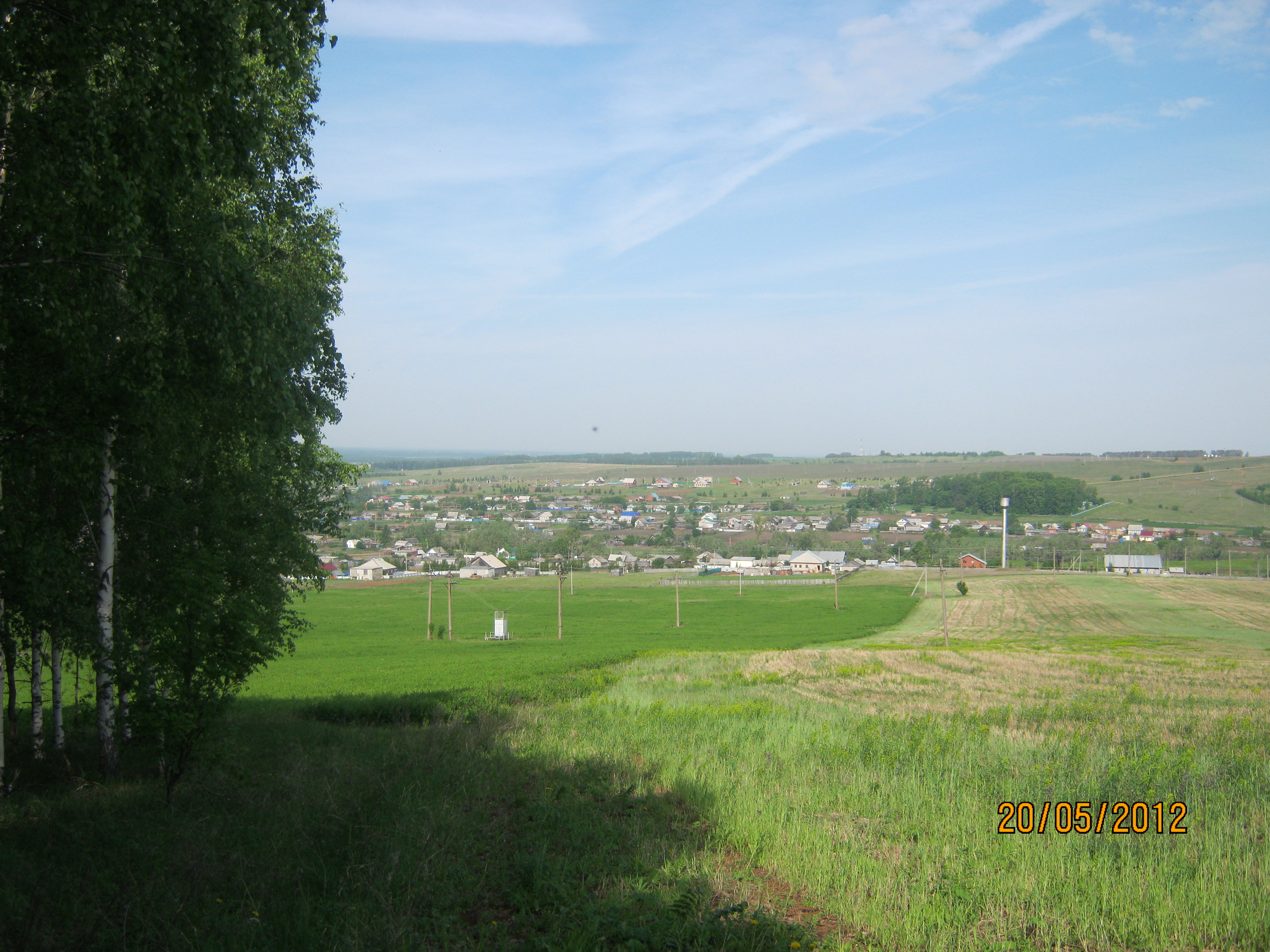

- Location within Bashkortostan Location within Russia
- Coordinates: 55°55′N 54°18′E
- Country: Russia
- Region: Bashkortostan
- District: Krasnokamsky District
- Time zone: UTC+5:00

Novy Aktanyshbash (Russian: Новый Актанышбаш; Bashkir: Яңы Аҡтанышбаш, Yañı Aqtanışbaş) is a rural locality (a selo) in Shushnursky Selsoviet, Krasnokamsky District, Bashkortostan, Russia. The population was 735 as of 2010. There are 9 streets.

== Geography ==
Novy Aktanyshbash is located 31 km south of Nikolo-Beryozovka (the district's administrative centre) by road. Novonagayevo is the nearest rural locality.
