= Talog, Russia =

Village in Askinsky District, Bashkortostan, Russia

Talog Талог
- Village
- Location within Bashkortostan Location within Russia
- Coordinates: 56°15′N 56°37′E
- Country: Russia
- Region: Bashkortostan
- District: Askinsky District
- Time zone: UTC+5:00

Talog (Russian: Талог) is a rural locality (a village) in Askinsky Selsoviet, Askinsky District, Bashkortostan, Russia. The population was 26 as of 2010. There are 4 streets.

== Geography ==
Talog is located 27 km north of Askino (the district's administrative centre) by road. Verkhnenikolskoye is the nearest rural locality.
