= Yanaul, Novoyanzigitovsky Selsoviet, Krasnokamsky District, Republic of Bashkortostan =

Yanaul Янаул
- Village
- Location within Bashkortostan Location within Russia
- Coordinates: 55°53′N 54°09′E
- Country: Russia
- Region: Bashkortostan
- District: Krasnokamsky District
- Time zone: UTC+5:00

Yanaul (Russian: Янаул; Bashkir: Яңауыл, Yañawıl) is a rural locality (a village) in Novoyanzigitovsky Selsoviet, Krasnokamsky District, Bashkortostan, Russia. The population was 51 as of 2010.

== Geography ==
It is located 46 km from Nikolo-Beryozovka and 3 km from Novy Yanzigit.
