= Yanaul, Shushnursky Selsoviet, Krasnokamsky District, Republic of Bashkortostan =

Yanaul Янаул
- Village
- Location within Bashkortostan Location within Russia
- Coordinates: 55°48′N 54°23′E
- Country: Russia
- Region: Bashkortostan
- District: Krasnokamsky District
- Time zone: UTC+5:00

Yanaul (Russian: Янаул; Bashkir: Яңауыл, Yañawıl) is a rural locality (a village) in Shushnursky Selsoviet, Krasnokamsky District, Bashkortostan, Russia. The population was 7 as of 2010.
