= Yanaul, Kugarchinsky District, Republic of Bashkortostan =

Yanaul Янаул
- Selo
- Location within Bashkortostan Location within Russia
- Coordinates: 52°34′N 56°27′E
- Country: Russia
- Region: Bashkortostan
- District: Kugarchinsky District
- Time zone: UTC+5:00

Yanaul (Russian: Янаул; Bashkir: Яңауыл, Yañawıl) is a rural locality (a selo) in Isimovsky Selsoviet, Kugarchinsky District, Bashkortostan, Russia. The population was 241 as of 2010. There is 1 street.

== Geography ==
Yanaul is located 28 km southwest of Mrakovo (the district's administrative centre) by road. Saratovsky is the nearest rural locality.
