= Nikolo-Beryozovka =

Nikolo-Beryozovka Николо-Берёзовка
- Selo

Other transcription(s)
  - Bashkir: Николо-Берёзовка
- Interactive map of Nikolo-Beryozovka
- Location of Nikolo-Beryozovka Nikolo-Beryozovka (Bashkortostan)
- Coordinates: 56°08′N 54°09′E
- Country: Russia
- Federal subject: Bashkortostan
- Administrative district: Krasnokamsky District
- SelsovietSelsoviet: Nikolo-Beryozovsky
- Founded: 1550

Population (2010 Census)
  - Total: 6,099
  - Estimate (2017): 6,202 (+1.7%)

Administrative status
  - Capital of: Krasnokamsky District, Nikolo-Beryozovsky Selsoviet

Municipal status
  - Municipal district: Krasnokamsky Municipal District
  - Rural settlement: Nikolo-Beryozovsky Selsoviet Rural Settlement
  - Capital of: Krasnokamsky Municipal District, Nikolo-Beryozovsky Selsoviet Rural Settlement
- Time zone: UTC+5 (MSK+2)
- Postal code: 452930
- OKTMO ID: 80637421101

Nikolo-Beryozovka (Russian: Нико́ло-Берёзовка; Bashkir: Николо-Берёзовка) is a rural locality (a selo) and the administrative center of Krasnokamsky District in the Republic of Bashkortostan, Russia, located on the Kama River, 6 kilometres (3.7 mi) from Neftekamsk. Population: 6,099 (2010 census); 5,981 (2002 census); 5,270 (1989 Soviet census).
