= Krasnokamsky District =

Krasnokamsky District Краснокамский район (Russian)
- District

Other transcription(s)
  - Bashkir: Краснокама районы
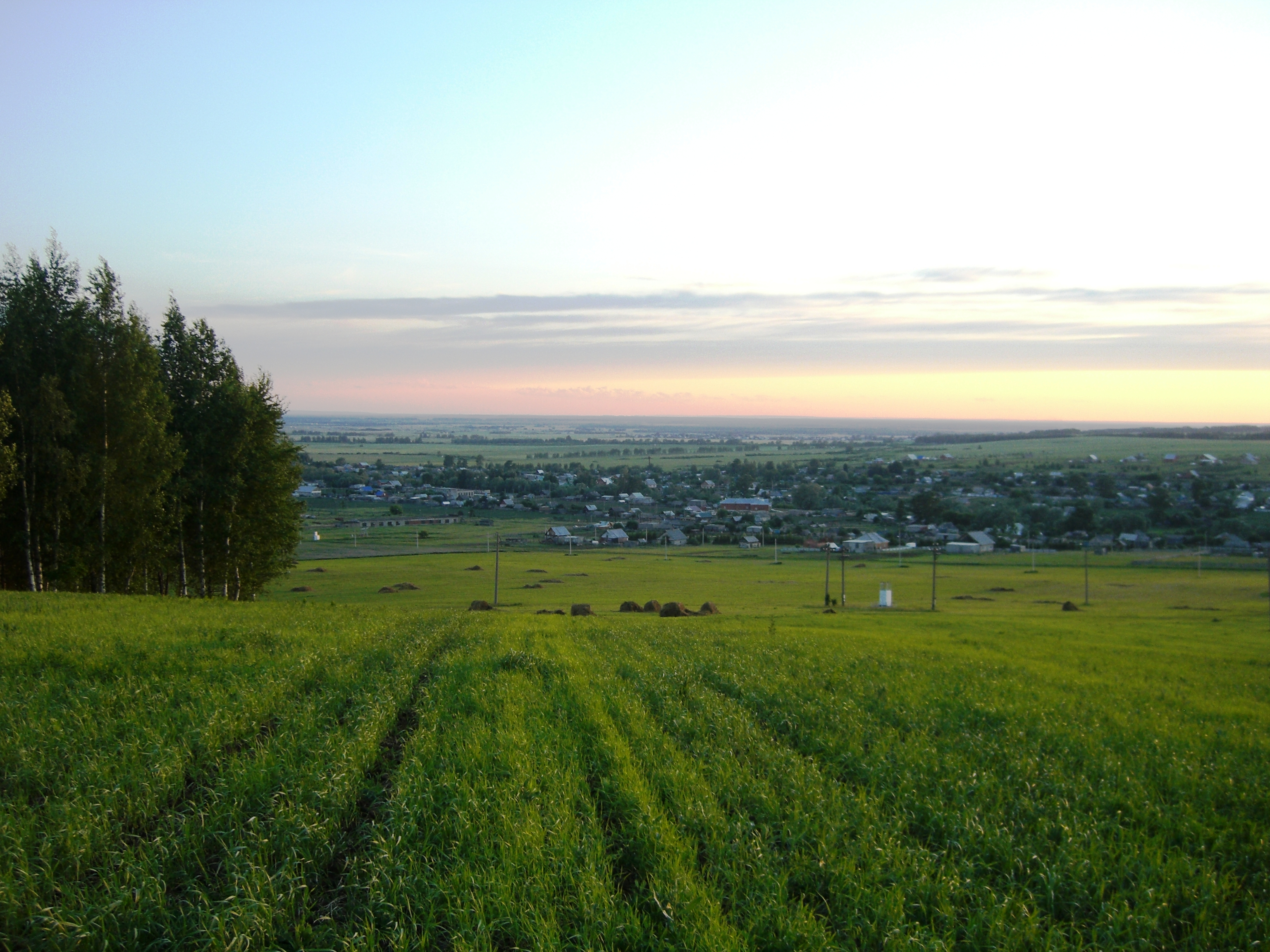
- View of the selo of Novy Aktanyshbash in Krasnokamsky District

- Flag Coat of arms
- Location of Krasnokamsky District in the Republic of Bashkortostan
- Coordinates: 56°08′N 54°10′E
- Country: Russia
- Federal subject: Republic of Bashkortostan
- Established: January 31, 1935
- Administrative center: Nikolo-Beryozovka

Area
  - Total: 1,594.92 km^{2} (615.80 sq mi)

Population (2010 Census)
  - Total: 27,986
  - Estimate (2018): 27,213 (−2.8%)
  - Density: 17.547/km^{2} (45.446/sq mi)
  - Urban: 0%
  - Rural: 100%

Administrative structure
  - Administrative divisions: 14 Selsoviets
  - Inhabited localities: 68 rural localities

Municipal structure
  - Municipally incorporated as: Krasnokamsky Municipal District
  - Municipal divisions: 0 urban settlements, 14 rural settlements
- Time zone: UTC+5 (MSK+2)
- OKTMO ID: 80637000
- Website: http://www.krasnokama.ru

Population of Krasnokamsky District
- 2010 Census: 27,986
- 2002 Census: 27,552
- 1989 Census: 42,535
- 1979 Census: 34,280

Krasnokamsky District (Russian: Краснока́мский райо́н; Bashkir: Краснокама районы, Krasnokama rayonı; Tatar: Кызыл Кама районы, Qızıl Qama rayonı) is an administrative and municipal district (raion), one of the fifty-four in the Republic of Bashkortostan, Russia. It is located in the northwest of the republic and borders with the territory of the city of republic significance of Neftekamsk in the north, Yanaulsky District in the northeast, Kaltasinsky District in the east, Ilishevsky District in the south, the Republic of Tatarstan in the south and southwest, and with the Udmurt Republic in the west and northwest. The area of the district is 1,594.92 square kilometers (615.80 sq mi). Its administrative center is the rural locality (a selo) of Nikolo-Beryozovka. As of the 2010 Census, the total population of the district was 27,986, with the population of Nikolo-Beryozovka accounting for 21.8% of that number.

== History ==
The district was established on January 31, 1935.

== Administrative and municipal status ==
Within the framework of administrative divisions, Krasnokamsky District is one of the fifty-four in the Republic of Bashkortostan. The district is divided into fourteen selsoviets, comprising sixty-eight rural localities. As a municipal division, the district is incorporated as Krasnokamsky Municipal District. Its fourteen selsoviets are incorporated as fourteen rural settlements within the municipal district. The selo of Nikolo-Beryozovka serves as the administrative center of both the administrative and municipal district.
