= Askino, Askinsky District, Republic of Bashkortostan =

Selo in Askinaky District, Bashkortostan, Russia

Askino Аскино
- Selo

Other transcription(s)
  - Bashkir: Асҡын
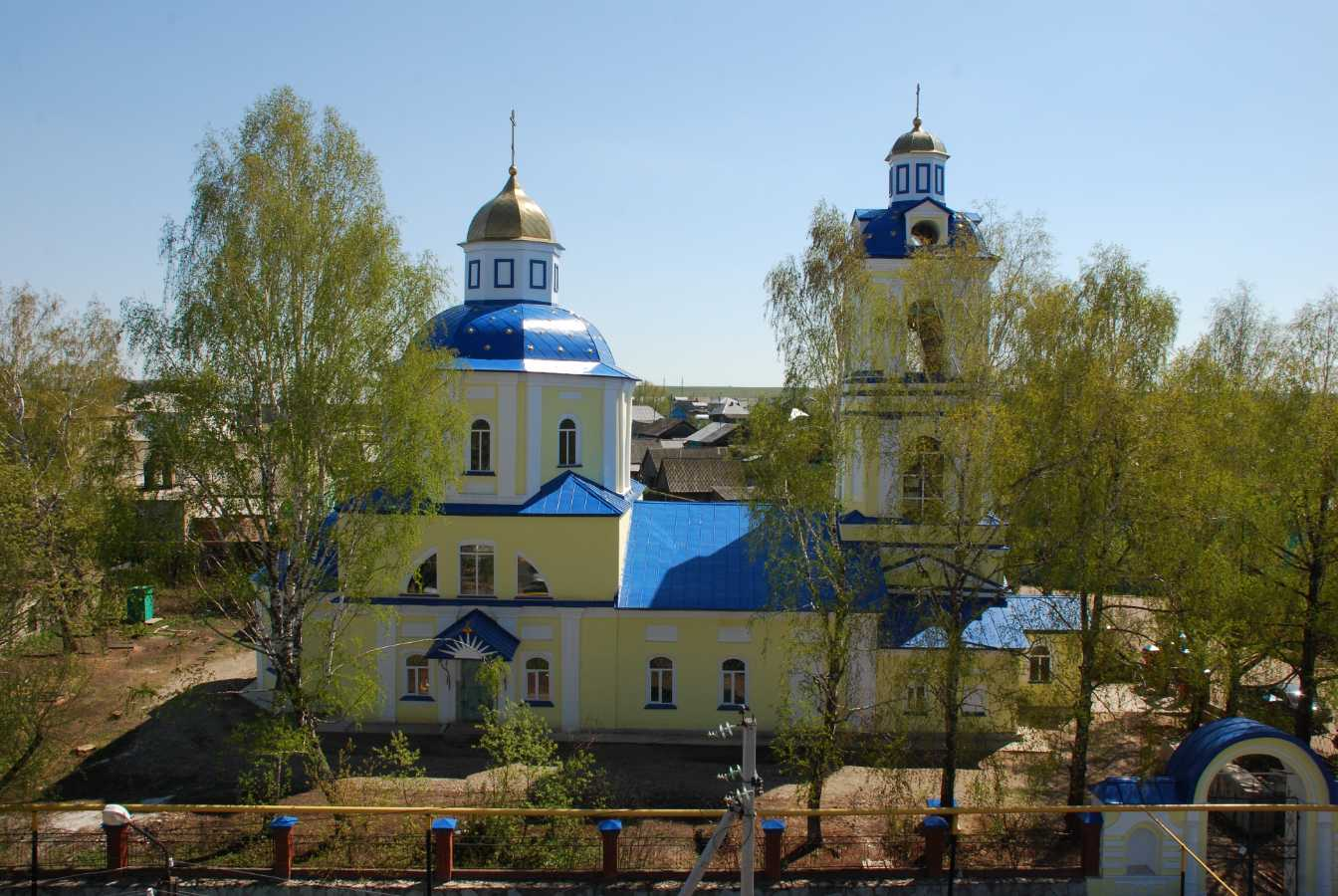
- Church of St. Nicholas the Wonderworker in Askino
- Interactive map of Askino
- Location of Askino Askino (Bashkortostan)
- Coordinates: 54°15′02″N 56°52′22″E
- Country: Russia
- Federal subject: Bashkortostan
- Administrative district: Askinsky District
- SelsovietSelsoviet: Askinsky Selsoviet
- Elevation: 208 m (682 ft)

Population (2010 Census)
  - Total: 6,918
  - Estimate (2021): 7,704 (+11.4%)

Administrative status
  - Capital of: Askinsky District, Askinsky Selsoviet

Municipal status
  - Municipal district: Askinsky Municipal District
  - Rural settlement: Askinsky Selsoviet Rural Settlement
  - Capital of: Askinsky Municipal District, Askinsky Selsoviet Rural Settlement
- Time zone: UTC+5 (MSK+2)
- Postal code: 452880
- OKTMO ID: 80604404101

Askino (Russian: Аскино, Bashkir: Асҡын, Asqın) is a rural locality (a selo) and the administrative center of Askinsky District of the Republic of Bashkortostan, Russia. Population: 6,918 (2010 census); 6,853 (2002 census); 5,800 (1989 Soviet census).
