= Askinsky District =

Askinsky District Аскинский район (Russian)
- District

Other transcription(s)
  - Bashkir: Асҡын районы
- Flag Coat of arms
- Location of Askinsky District in the Republic of Bashkortostan
- Coordinates: 56°08′N 57°21′E
- Country: Russia
- Federal subject: Republic of Bashkortostan
- Established: August 1930
- Administrative center: Askino

Area
  - Total: 2,542 km^{2} (981 sq mi)

Population (2010 Census)
  - Total: 21,272
  - Density: 8.368/km^{2} (21.67/sq mi)
  - Urban: 0%
  - Rural: 100%

Administrative structure
  - Administrative divisions: 15 Selsoviets
  - Inhabited localities: 74 rural localities

Municipal structure
  - Municipally incorporated as: Askinsky Municipal District
  - Municipal divisions: 0 urban settlements, 15 rural settlements
- Time zone: UTC+5 (MSK+2)
- OKTMO ID: 80604000
- Website: http://www.askino.ru/

Population of Askinsky District
- 2010 Census: 21,272
- 2002 Census: 23,928
- 1989 Census: 23,505
- 1979 Census: 28,261

Askinsky District (Russian: А́скинский райо́н; Bashkir: Асҡын районы, Asqın rayonı) is an administrative and municipal district (raion), one of the fifty-four in the Republic of Bashkortostan, Russia. It is located in the north of the republic. The area of the district is 2,542 square kilometers (981 sq mi). Its administrative center is the rural locality (a selo) of Askino. As of the 2010 Census, the total population of the district was 21,272, with the population of Askino accounting for 32.5% of that number. By 2021, the population had fallen to 18,235.

== History ==
The district was established in August 1930.

== Administrative and municipal status ==
Within the framework of administrative divisions, Askinsky District is one of the fifty-four in the Republic of Bashkortostan. The district is divided into fifteen selsoviets, comprising seventy-four rural localities. As a municipal division, the district is incorporated as Askinsky Municipal District. Its fifteen selsoviets are incorporated as fifteen rural settlements within the municipal district. The selo of Askino serves as the administrative center of both the administrative and municipal district.

== Economy ==
Agricultural and forestry areas dominate in the district. Agricultural lands occupy 92,800 hectares (229,000 acres), or 36.7% of the total area. The main crops are rye, wheat, potatoes, and beef; there are many livestock farms. Logging is conducted in the district.
