= Verkhneyanaktayevo =

Verkhneyanaktayevo Верхнеянактаево
- Village
- Location within Bashkortostan Location within Russia
- Coordinates: 55°57′N 55°56′E
- Country: Russia
- Region: Bashkortostan
- District: Baltachevsky District
- Time zone: UTC+5:00

Verkhneyanaktayevo (Russian: Верхнеянактаево; Bashkir: Үрге Янаҡтай, Ürge Yanaqtay) is a rural locality (a village) in Verkhneyanaktayevsky Selsoviet, Baltachevsky District, Bashkortostan, Russia. The population was 171 as of 2010. There are 6 streets.

== Geography ==
Verkhneyanaktayevo is located 8 km southeast of Starobaltachevo (the district's administrative centre) by road. Nizhneyanaktayevo is the nearest rural locality.
