= Novoyanbayevo =

Novoyanbayevo Новоянбаево
- Village
- Location within Bashkortostan Location within Russia
- Coordinates: 55°59′N 56°12′E
- Country: Russia
- Region: Bashkortostan
- District: Baltachevsky District
- Time zone: UTC+5:00

Novoyanbayevo (Russian: Новоянбаево; Bashkir: Яңы Янбай, Yañı Yanbay) is a rural locality (a village) in Staroyanbayevsky Selsoviet, Baltachevsky District, Bashkortostan, Russia. The population was 2 as of 2010. There are 3 streets.

== Geography ==
Novoyanbayevo is located 36 km southeast of Starobaltachevo (the district's administrative centre) by road. Mishkino is the nearest rural locality.
