= Novotoshkurovo =

Novotoshkurovo Новотошкурово
- Village
- Location within Bashkortostan Location within Russia
- Coordinates: 56°02′N 56°07′E
- Country: Russia
- Region: Bashkortostan
- District: Baltachevsky District
- Time zone: UTC+5:00

Novotoshkurovo (Russian: Новотошкурово; Bashkir: Яңы Тушҡыр, Yañı Tuşqır) is a rural locality (a village) in Shtandinsky Selsoviet, Baltachevsky District, Bashkortostan, Russia. The population was 2 as of 2010. There is 1 street.

== Geography ==
Novotoshkurovo is located 25 km northeast of Starobaltachevo (the district's administrative centre) by road. Shtandy is the nearest rural locality.
