= Ishtiryakovo =

Ishtiryakovo Иштиряково
- Village
- Location within Bashkortostan Location within Russia
- Coordinates: 55°52′N 55°57′E
- Country: Russia
- Region: Bashkortostan
- District: Baltachevsky District
- Time zone: UTC+5:00

Ishtiryakovo (Russian: Иштиряково; Bashkir: Иштирәк, İştiräk) is a rural locality (a village) in Verkhneyanaktayevsky Selsoviet, Baltachevsky District, Bashkortostan, Russia. The population was 201 as of 2010. There are 4 streets.

== Geography ==
Ishtiryakovo is located 17 km south of Starobaltachevo (the district's administrative centre) by road. Chishma is the nearest rural locality.
