= Chiyatau =

Chiyatau Чиятау
- Village
- Location within Bashkortostan Location within Russia
- Coordinates: 55°59′N 55°34′E
- Country: Russia
- Region: Bashkortostan
- District: Baltachevsky District
- Time zone: UTC+5:00

Chiyatau (Russian: Чиятау; Bashkir: Сейәтау, Seyätaw) is a rural locality (a village) in Tuchubayevsky Selsoviet, Baltachevsky District, Bashkortostan, Russia. The population was 5 as of 2010. There is 1 street.

== Geography ==
Chiyatau is located 67 km west of Starobaltachevo (the district's administrative centre) by road.
