= Kundashly =

Kundashly Кундашлы
- Village
- Location within Bashkortostan Location within Russia
- Coordinates: 55°50′N 56°12′E
- Country: Russia
- Region: Bashkortostan
- District: Baltachevsky District
- Time zone: UTC+5:00

Kundashly (Russian: Кундашлы; Bashkir: Көндәшле, Köndäşle) is a rural locality (a village) and the administrative centre of Kundashlinsky Selsoviet, Baltachevsky District, Bashkortostan, Russia. The population was 597 as of 2010. There are 12 streets.

== Geography ==
Kundashly is located 30 km southeast of Starobaltachevo (the district's administrative centre) by road. Chukaly is the nearest rural locality.
