= Kazanka, Baltachevsky District, Republic of Bashkortostan =

Kazanka Казанка
- Village
- Location within Bashkortostan Location within Russia
- Coordinates: 55°49′N 56°19′E
- Country: Russia
- Region: Bashkortostan
- District: Baltachevsky District
- Time zone: UTC+5:00

Kazanka (Russian: Казанка) is a rural locality (a village) in Kundashlinsky Selsoviet, Baltachevsky District, Bashkortostan, Russia. The population was 201 as of 2010. There is 1 street.

== Geography ==
Kazanka is located 91 km southeast of Starobaltachevo (the district's administrative centre) by road. Taykash is the nearest rural locality.
