= Starodyurtyukeyevo =

Starodyurtyukeyevo Стародюртюкеево
- Village
- Location within Bashkortostan Location within Russia
- Coordinates: 55°56′N 55°42′E
- Country: Russia
- Region: Bashkortostan
- District: Baltachevsky District
- Time zone: UTC+5:00

Starodyurtyukeyevo (Russian: Стародюртюкеево; Bashkir: Иҫке Дүртекәй, İśke Dürtekäy) is a rural locality (a village) in Seytyakovsky Selsoviet, Baltachevsky District, Bashkortostan, Russia. The population was 83 as of 2010. There are 2 streets.

== Geography ==
Starodyurtyukeyevo is located 25 km southwest of Starobaltachevo (the district's administrative centre) by road. Novodyurtyukeyevo and Starokizganovo are the nearest rural localities.
