= Ardagysh =

Ardagysh Ардагыш
- Village
- Location within Bashkortostan Location within Russia
- Coordinates: 56°06′N 56°09′E
- Country: Russia
- Region: Bashkortostan
- District: Baltachevsky District
- Time zone: UTC+5:00

Ardagysh (Russian: Ардагыш; Bashkir: Әрҙәгеш, Ärźägeş) is a rural locality (a village) in Shtandinsky Selsoviet, Baltachevsky District, Bashkortostan, Russia. The population was 37 as of 2010. There is 1 street.

== Geography ==
Ardagysh is located 21 km northeast of Starobaltachevo (the district's administrative centre) by road. Shtandy is the nearest rural locality.
