= Novourazayevo =

Novourazayevo Новоуразаево
- Village
- Location within Bashkortostan Location within Russia
- Coordinates: 55°57′N 56°06′E
- Country: Russia
- Region: Bashkortostan
- District: Baltachevsky District
- Time zone: UTC+5:00

Novourazayevo (Russian: Новоуразаево; Bashkir: Яңы Уразай, Yañı Urazay) is a rural locality (a village) in Kuntugushevsky Selsoviet, Baltachevsky District, Bashkortostan, Russia. The population was 44 as of 2010. There are 2 streets.

== Geography ==
Novourazayevo is located 17 km southeast of Starobaltachevo (the district's administrative centre) by road. Yantimirovo is the nearest rural locality.
