= Yantimirovo =

Yantimirovo Янтимирово
- Village
- Location within Bashkortostan Location within Russia
- Coordinates: 55°58′N 56°08′E
- Country: Russia
- Region: Bashkortostan
- District: Baltachevsky District

Population (2010)
  - Total: 205
- Time zone: UTC+5:00

Yantimirovo (Russian: Янтимирово; Bashkir: Йәнтимер, Yäntimer) is a rural locality (a village) in Kuntugushevsky Selsoviet, Baltachevsky District, Bashkortostan, Russia. The population was 205 as of 2010. There are 6 streets.

== Geography ==
Yantimirovo is located 19 km southeast of Starobaltachevo (the district's administrative centre) by road. Novourazayevo is the nearest rural locality.
