= Usmanovo, Baltachevsky District, Republic of Bashkortostan =

Usmanovo Усманово
- Village
- Location within Bashkortostan Location within Russia
- Coordinates: 55°55′N 55°47′E
- Country: Russia
- Region: Bashkortostan
- District: Baltachevsky District
- Time zone: UTC+5:00

Usmanovo (Russian: Усманово; Bashkir: Уҫман, Uśman) is a rural locality (a village) in Norkinsky Selsoviet, Baltachevsky District, Bashkortostan, Russia. The population was 151 as of 2010. There are 5 streets.

== Geography ==
Usmanovo is located 15 km southwest of Starobaltachevo (the district's administrative centre) by road. Norkino is the nearest rural locality.
