= Sandugach =

Sandugach Сандугач
- Village
- Location within Bashkortostan Location within Russia
- Coordinates: 56°02′N 56°17′E
- Country: Russia
- Region: Bashkortostan
- District: Baltachevsky District
- Time zone: UTC+5:00

Sandugach (Russian: Сандугач; Bashkir: Һандуғас, Handuğas) is a rural locality (a village) in Shtandinsky Selsoviet, Baltachevsky District, Bashkortostan, Russia. The population was 431 as of 2010. There are 9 streets.

== Geography ==
Sandugach is located 29 km east of Starobaltachevo (the district's administrative centre) by road. Kigazy is the nearest rural locality.
