= Norkino =

Norkino Норкино
- Village
- Location within Bashkortostan Location within Russia
- Coordinates: 55°54′N 55°49′E
- Country: Russia
- Region: Bashkortostan
- District: Baltachevsky District
- Time zone: UTC+5:00

Norkino (Russian: Норкино; Bashkir: Нөркә, Nörkä) is a rural locality (a village) and the administrative centre of Norkinsky Selsoviet, Baltachevsky District, Bashkortostan, Russia. The population was 406 as of 2010. There are 9 streets.

== Geography ==
Norkino is located 14 km southwest of Starobaltachevo (the district's administrative centre) by road. Usmanovo is the nearest rural locality.
