= Nizhnesikiyazovo =

Nizhnesikiyazovo Нижнесикиязово
- Selo
- Location within Bashkortostan Location within Russia
- Coordinates: 56°07′N 55°54′E
- Country: Russia
- Region: Bashkortostan
- District: Baltachevsky District
- Time zone: UTC+5:00

Nizhnesikiyazovo (Russian: Нижнесикиязово; Bashkir: Түбәнге Һикеяҙ, Tübänge Hikeyaź) is a rural locality (a selo) and the administrative centre of Nizhnesikiyazovsky Selsoviet, Baltachevsky District, Bashkortostan, Russia. The population was 459 as of a country-wide census in 2010. There are 8 streets.

== Geography ==
Nizhnesikiyazovo is located 16 km north of Starobaltachevo (the district's administrative centre) by road. Tashly-Yelga is the nearest rural locality.
