= Yalangachevo =

Yalangachevo Ялангачево
- Village
- Location within Bashkortostan Location within Russia
- Coordinates: 55°57′N 56°16′E
- Country: Russia
- Region: Bashkortostan
- District: Baltachevsky District
- Time zone: UTC+5:00

Yalangachevo (Russian: Ялангачево; Bashkir: Яланғас, Yalanğas) is a rural locality (a village) and the administrative centre of Yalangachevsky Selsoviet, Baltachevsky District, Bashkortostan, Russia. The population was 211 as of 2010. There are 3 streets.

== Geography ==
Yalangachevo is located 35 km southeast of Starobaltachevo (the district's administrative centre) by road. Mishkino is the nearest rural locality.
