= Novoyaksheyevo =

Novoyaksheyevo Новоякшеево
- Village
- Location within Bashkortostan Location within Russia
- Coordinates: 56°07′N 55°51′E
- Country: Russia
- Region: Bashkortostan
- District: Baltachevsky District
- Time zone: UTC+5:00

Novoyaksheyevo (Russian: Новоякшеево; Bashkir: Яңы Яҡшый, Yañı Yaqşıy) is a rural locality (a village) in Nizhnesikiyazovsky Selsoviet, Baltachevsky District, Bashkortostan, Russia. The population was 40 as of 2010. The village has three streets.

== Geography ==
Novoyaksheyevo is located 20 km north of Starobaltachevo (the district's administrative centre) by road. Nizhnesikiyazovo is the nearest rural locality.
