= Urta-Yelga =

Urta-Yelga Урта-Елга
- Village
- Location within Bashkortostan Location within Russia
- Coordinates: 56°07′N 55°57′E
- Country: Russia
- Region: Bashkortostan
- District: Baltachevsky District
- Time zone: UTC+5:00

Urta-Yelga (Russian: Урта-Елга; Bashkir: Уртайылға, Urtayılğa) is a rural locality (a village) in Nizhnesikiyazovsky Selsoviet, Baltachevsky District, Bashkortostan, Russia. The population was 46 as of 2010. There are 2 streets.

== Geography ==
Urta-Yelga is located 15 km north of Starobaltachevo (the district's administrative centre) by road. Tashly-Yelga is the nearest rural locality.
