= Tuktayevo =

Tuktayevo Туктаево
- Village
- Location within Bashkortostan Location within Russia
- Coordinates: 56°01′N 56°02′E
- Country: Russia
- Region: Bashkortostan
- District: Baltachevsky District
- Time zone: UTC+5:00

Tuktayevo (Russian: Туктаево; Bashkir: Туҡтай, Tuqtay) is a rural locality (a village) in Starobaltachevsky Selsoviet, Baltachevsky District, Bashkortostan, Russia. The population was 115 as of 2010. There are 5 streets.

== Geography ==
Tuktayevo is located 10 km northeast of Starobaltachevo (the district's administrative centre) by road. Novobaltachevo is the nearest rural locality.
