= Imyanovo =

Imyanovo Имяново
- Village
- Location within Bashkortostan Location within Russia
- Coordinates: 55°51′N 55°48′E
- Country: Russia
- Region: Bashkortostan
- District: Baltachevsky District
- Time zone: UTC+5:00

Imyanovo (Russian: Имяново; Bashkir: Имән, İmän) is a rural locality (a village) in Norkinsky Selsoviet, Baltachevsky District, Bashkortostan, Russia. The population was 169 as of 2010. There are 5 streets.

== Geography ==
Imyanovo is located 20 km south of Starobaltachevo (the district's administrative centre) by road. Nacharovo is the nearest rural locality.
