= Nacharovo =

Nacharovo Начарово
- Village
- Location within Bashkortostan Location within Russia
- Coordinates: 55°48′N 55°54′E
- Country: Russia
- Region: Bashkortostan
- District: Baltachevsky District
- Time zone: UTC+5:00

Nacharovo (Russian: Начарово; Bashkir: Нажар, Najar) is a rural locality (a village) in Nizhnekaryshevsky Selsoviet, Baltachevsky District, Bashkortostan, Russia. The population was 268 as of 2010. There are 7 streets.

== Geography ==
Nacharovo is located 30 km south of Starobaltachevo (the district's administrative centre) by road. Zilyazekulevo is the nearest rural locality.
