= Tashly-Yelga =

Tashly-Yelga Ташлы-Елга
- Village
- Location within Bashkortostan Location within Russia
- Coordinates: 56°07′N 55°56′E
- Country: Russia
- Region: Bashkortostan
- District: Baltachevsky District
- Time zone: UTC+5:00

Tashly-Yelga (Russian: Ташлы-Елга; Bashkir: Ташлыйылға, Taşlıyılğa) is a rural locality (a village) in Nizhnesikiyazovsky Selsoviet, Baltachevsky District, Bashkortostan, Russia. The population was 105 as of 2010. There are 2 streets.

== Geography ==
Tashly-Yelga is located 14 km north of Starobaltachevo (the district's administrative centre) by road. Urta-Yelga is the nearest rural locality.
