= Verkhnekansiyarovo =

Verkhnekansiyarovo Верхнекансиярово
- Village
- Location within Bashkortostan Location within Russia
- Coordinates: 56°00′N 55°43′E
- Country: Russia
- Region: Bashkortostan
- District: Baltachevsky District
- Time zone: UTC+5:00

Verkhnekansiyarovo (Russian: Верхнекансиярово; Bashkir: Үрге Ҡанһөйәр, Ürge Qanhöyär) is a rural locality (a village) in Tuchubayevsky Selsoviet, Baltachevsky District, Bashkortostan, Russia. The population was 211 as of 2010. There are 7 streets.

== Geography ==
Verkhnekansiyarovo is located 21 km west of Starobaltachevo (the district's administrative centre) by road. Nizhnekansiyarovo is the nearest rural locality.
