= Tuchubayevo =

Tuchubayevo Тучубаево
- Selo
- Location within Bashkortostan Location within Russia
- Coordinates: 55°59′N 55°42′E
- Country: Russia
- Region: Bashkortostan
- District: Baltachevsky District
- Time zone: UTC+5:00

Tuchubayevo (Russian: Тучубаево; Bashkir: Тусыбай, Tusıbay) is a rural locality (a selo) and the administrative centre of Tuchubayevsky Selsoviet, Baltachevsky District, Bashkortostan, Russia. The population was 381 as of 2010. There are 2 streets.

== Geography ==
Tuchubayevo is located 21 km west of Starobaltachevo (the district's administrative centre) by road. Verkhnekansiyarovo is the nearest rural locality.
