= Staroyamurzino =

Staroyamurzino Староямурзино
- Village
- Location within Bashkortostan Location within Russia
- Coordinates: 55°56′N 55°50′E
- Country: Russia
- Region: Bashkortostan
- District: Baltachevsky District
- Time zone: UTC+5:00

Staroyamurzino (Russian: Староямурзино; Bashkir: Иҫке Ямурҙа, İśke Yamurźa) is a rural locality (a village) in Seytyakovsky Selsoviet, Baltachevsky District, Bashkortostan, Russia. The population was 162 as of 2010. There are 2 streets.

== Geography ==
Staroyamurzino is located 10 km southwest of Starobaltachevo (the district's administrative centre) by road. Usmanovo is the nearest rural locality.
