= Kumyazy =

Kumyazy Кумьязы
- Village
- Location within Bashkortostan Location within Russia
- Coordinates: 56°00′N 56°00′E
- Country: Russia
- Region: Bashkortostan
- District: Baltachevsky District
- Time zone: UTC+5:00

Kumyazy (Russian: Кумьязы; Bashkir: Ҡомъяҙы, Qomyaźı) is a rural locality (a village) in Starobaltachevsky Selsoviet, Baltachevsky District, Bashkortostan, Russia. The population was 532 as of 2010. There are 7 streets.

== Geography ==
Kumyazy is located 6 km east of Starobaltachevo (the district's administrative centre) by road. Starobaltachevo is the nearest rural locality.
