= Nizhneivanayevo =

Nizhneivanayevo Нижнеиванаево
- Village
- Location within Bashkortostan Location within Russia
- Coordinates: 55°57′N 55°59′E
- Country: Russia
- Region: Bashkortostan
- District: Baltachevsky District
- Time zone: UTC+5:00

Nizhneivanayevo (Russian: Нижнеиванаево; Bashkir: Түбәнге Иванай, Tübänge İvanay) is a rural locality (a village) and the administrative centre of Kuntugushevsky Selsoviet, Baltachevsky District, Bashkortostan, Russia. The population was 314 as of 2010. There are 5 streets.

== Geography ==
Nizhneivanayevo is located 9 km southeast of Starobaltachevo (the district's administrative centre) by road. Verkhneivanayevo is the nearest rural locality.
