= Kyzyl-Kul =

Kyzyl-Kul Кызыл-Куль
- Village
- Location within Bashkortostan Location within Russia
- Coordinates: 55°45′N 56°01′E
- Country: Russia
- Region: Bashkortostan
- District: Baltachevsky District
- Time zone: UTC+5:00

Kyzyl-Kul (Russian: Кызыл-Куль; Bashkir: Ҡыҙылкүл, Qıźılkül) is a rural locality (a village) in Nizhnekaryshevsky Selsoviet, Baltachevsky District, Bashkortostan, Russia. The population was 22 as of 2010. There is 1 street.

== Geography ==
Kyzyl-Kul is located 34 km south of Starobaltachevo (the district's administrative centre) by road. Kyzyl Vostok is the nearest rural locality.
