= Kuntugushevo =

Kuntugushevo Кунтугушево
- Village
- Location within Bashkortostan Location within Russia
- Coordinates: 55°57′N 56°04′E
- Country: Russia
- Region: Bashkortostan
- District: Baltachevsky District
- Time zone: UTC+5:00

Kuntugushevo (Russian: Кунтугушево; Bashkir: Көнтүгеш, Köntügeş) is a rural locality (a village) in Kuntugushevsky Selsoviet, Baltachevsky District, Bashkortostan, Russia. The population was 247 as of 2010. There are 11 streets.

== Geography ==
Kuntugushevo is located 14 km southeast of Starobaltachevo (the district's administrative centre) by road. Novourazayevo is the nearest rural locality.
