= Nizhnekansiyarovo =

Nizhnekansiyarovo Нижнекансиярово
- Village
- Location within Bashkortostan Location within Russia
- Coordinates: 56°00′N 55°45′E
- Country: Russia
- Region: Bashkortostan
- District: Baltachevsky District
- Time zone: UTC+5:00

Nizhnekansiyarovo (Russian: Нижнекансиярово; Bashkir: Түбәнге Ҡанһөйәр, Tübänge Qanhöyär) is a rural locality (a village) in Tuchubayevsky Selsoviet, Baltachevsky District, Bashkortostan, Russia. The population was 155 as of 2010. There are 3 streets.

== Geography ==
Nizhnekansiyarovo is located 23 km (14 mi) west of Starobaltachevo (the district's administrative centre) by road. Verkhnekansiyarovo is the nearest rural locality.
