= Managazovo =

Managazovo Манагазово
- Village
- Location within Bashkortostan Location within Russia
- Coordinates: 56°05′N 56°02′E
- Country: Russia
- Region: Bashkortostan
- District: Baltachevsky District
- Time zone: UTC+5:00

Managazovo (Russian: Манагазово; Bashkir: Мәнәгәҙ, Mänägäź) is a rural locality (a village) in Toshkurovsky Selsoviet, Baltachevsky District, Bashkortostan, Russia. The population was 87 as of 2010. There are 2 streets.

== Geography ==
Managazovo is located 14 km northeast of Starobaltachevo (the district's administrative centre) by road. Toshkurovo is the nearest rural locality.
