= Starosultangulovo =

Starosultangulovo Старосултангулово
- Village
- Location within Bashkortostan Location within Russia
- Coordinates: 55°53′N 56°11′E
- Country: Russia
- Region: Bashkortostan
- District: Baltachevsky District
- Time zone: UTC+5:00

Starosultangulovo (Russian: Старосултангулово; Bashkir: Иҫке Солтанғол, İśke Soltanğol) is a rural locality (a village) in Staroyanbayevsky Selsoviet, Baltachevsky District, Bashkortostan, Russia. The population was 25 as of 2010. There is 1 street.

== Geography ==
Starosultangulovo is located 25 km southeast of Starobaltachevo (the district's administrative centre) by road. Chukaly is the nearest rural locality.
