= Novoyamurzino =

Novoyamurzino Новоямурзино
- Village
- Location within Bashkortostan Location within Russia
- Coordinates: 55°55′N 55°56′E
- Country: Russia
- Region: Bashkortostan
- District: Baltachevsky District
- Time zone: UTC+5:00

Novoyamurzino (Russian: Новоямурзино; Bashkir: Яңы Ямурҙа, Yañı Yamurźa) is a rural locality (a village) and the administrative centre of Verkhneyanaktayevsky Selsoviet, Baltachevsky District, Bashkortostan, Russia. The population was 297 as of 2010. There are 9 streets.

== Geography ==
Novoyamurzino is located 12 km south of Starobaltachevo (the district's administrative centre) by road. Verkhneyanaktayevo is the nearest rural locality.
