= Starotimkino =

Starotimkino Старотимкино
- Village
- Location within Bashkortostan Location within Russia
- Coordinates: 55°51′N 56°05′E
- Country: Russia
- Region: Bashkortostan
- District: Baltachevsky District
- Time zone: UTC+5:00

Starotimkino (Russian: Старотимкино; Bashkir: Иҫке Тимкә, İśke Timkä) is a rural locality (a village) and the administrative centre of Bogdanovsky Selsoviet, Baltachevsky District, Bashkortostan, Russia. The population was 505 as of 2010. There are 12 streets.

== Geography ==
Starotimkino is located 23 km southeast of Starobaltachevo (the district's administrative centre) by road. Bogdanovo is the nearest rural locality.
