= Zilyazekulevo =

Zilyazekulevo Зилязекулево
- Village
- Location within Bashkortostan Location within Russia
- Coordinates: 55°46′N 55°54′E
- Country: Russia
- Region: Bashkortostan
- District: Baltachevsky District
- Time zone: UTC+5:00

Zilyazekulevo (Russian: Зилязекулево; Bashkir: Еләҙекүл, Yeläźekül) is a rural locality (a village) in Nizhnekaryshevsky Selsoviet, Baltachevsky District, Bashkortostan, Russia. The population was 146 as of 2010. There are 4 streets.

== Geography ==
Zilyazekulevo is located 33 km south of Starobaltachevo (the district's administrative centre) by road. Nacharovo is the nearest rural locality.
