= Kyzyl Vostok =

Kyzyl Vostok Кызыл Восток
- Village
- Location within Bashkortostan Location within Russia
- Coordinates: 55°45′N 56°00′E
- Country: Russia
- Region: Bashkortostan
- District: Baltachevsky District
- Time zone: UTC+5:00

Kyzyl Vostok (Russian: Кызыл Восток; Bashkir: Ҡыҙыл Восток, Qıźıl Vostok) is a rural locality (a village) in Nizhnekaryshevsky Selsoviet, Baltachevsky District, Bashkortostan, Russia. The population was 43 as of 2010. There is 1 street.

== Geography ==
Kyzyl Vostok is located 32 km south of Starobaltachevo (the district's administrative centre) by road. Kyzyl-Kul is the nearest rural locality.
