= Staroyanbayevo =

Staroyanbayevo Староянбаево
- Village
- Location within Bashkortostan Location within Russia
- Coordinates: 55°54′N 56°09′E
- Country: Russia
- Region: Bashkortostan
- District: Baltachevsky District
- Time zone: UTC+5:00

Staroyanbayevo (Russian: Староянбаево; Bashkir: Иҫке Янбай, İśke Yanbay) is a rural locality (a village) and the administrative centre of Staroyanbayevsky Selsoviet, Baltachevsky District, Bashkortostan, Russia. The population was 325 as of 2010. There are 12 streets.

== Geography ==
Staroyanbayevo is located 22 km southeast of Starobaltachevo (the district's administrative centre) by road. Bigildino is the nearest rural locality.
