= Gareyka =

Gareyka Гарейка
- Village
- Location within Bashkortostan Location within Russia
- Coordinates: 56°09′N 55°59′E
- Country: Russia
- Region: Bashkortostan
- District: Baltachevsky District
- Time zone: UTC+5:00

Gareyka (Russian: Гарейка; Bashkir: Гәрәй, Gäräy) is a rural locality (a village) in Nizhnesikiyazovsky Selsoviet, Baltachevsky District, Bashkortostan, Russia. The population was 39 as of 2010. There is 1 street.

== Geography ==
Gareyka is located 19 km north of Starobaltachevo (the district's administrative centre) by road. Starokalmiyarovo is the nearest rural locality.
