= Tutagachevo =

Tutagachevo Тутагачево
- Village
- Location within Bashkortostan Location within Russia
- Coordinates: 56°05′N 55°57′E
- Country: Russia
- Region: Bashkortostan
- District: Baltachevsky District
- Time zone: UTC+5:00

Tutagachevo (Russian: Тутагачево; Bashkir: Тутағас, Tutağas) is a rural locality (a village) in Nizhnesikiyazovsky Selsoviet, Baltachevsky District, Bashkortostan, Russia. The population was 308 as of 2010. There are 7 streets.

== Geography ==
Tutagachevo is located 12 km north of Starobaltachevo (the district's administrative centre) by road. Mishcherovo is the nearest rural locality.
