= Bigildino =

Bigildino Бигильдино
- Village
- Location within Bashkortostan Location within Russia
- Coordinates: 55°54′N 56°11′E
- Country: Russia
- Region: Bashkortostan
- District: Baltachevsky District
- Time zone: UTC+5:00

Bigildino (Russian: Бигильдино; Bashkir: Бейгилде, Beygilde) is a rural locality (a village) in Staroyanbayevsky Selsoviet, Baltachevsky District, Bashkortostan, Russia. The population was 232 as of 2010. There are 6 streets.

== Geography ==
Bigildino is located 24 km southeast of Starobaltachevo (the district's administrative centre) by road. Starosultangulovo is the nearest rural locality.
