= Magashly-Almantayevo =

Magashly-Almantayevo Магашлы-Алмантаево
- Village
- Location within Bashkortostan Location within Russia
- Coordinates: 56°07′N 55°59′E
- Country: Russia
- Region: Bashkortostan
- District: Baltachevsky District
- Time zone: UTC+5:00

Magashly-Almantayevo (Russian: Магашлы-Алмантаево; Bashkir: Мағашлы-Алмантай, Mağaşlı-Almantay) is a rural locality (a village) in Nizhnesikiyazovsky Selsoviet, Baltachevsky District, Bashkortostan, Russia. The population was 248 as of 2010. There are 4 streets.

== Geography ==
Magashly-Almantayevo is located 19 km north of Starobaltachevo (the district's administrative centre) by road. Urta-Yelga is the nearest rural locality.
