= Kizganbashevo =

Kizganbashevo Кизганбашево
- Village
- Location within Bashkortostan Location within Russia
- Coordinates: 55°45′N 55°50′E
- Country: Russia
- Region: Bashkortostan
- District: Baltachevsky District
- Time zone: UTC+5:00

Kizganbashevo (Russian: Кизганбашево; Bashkir: Киҙгәнбаш, Kiźgänbaş) is a rural locality (a village) in Nizhnekaryshevsky Selsoviet, Baltachevsky District, Bashkortostan, Russia. The population was 158 as of 2010. There are 7 streets.

== Geography ==
Kizganbashevo is located 39 km south of Starobaltachevo (the district's administrative centre) by road. Starokaragushevo is the nearest rural locality.
