= Chipchikovo =

Chipchikovo Чипчиково
- Village
- Location within Bashkortostan Location within Russia
- Coordinates: 56°04′N 55°59′E
- Country: Russia
- Region: Bashkortostan
- District: Baltachevsky District
- Time zone: UTC+5:00

Chipchikovo (Russian: Чипчиково; Bashkir: Сыпсыҡ, Sıpsıq) is a rural locality (a village) in Toshkurovsky Selsoviet, Baltachevsky District, Bashkortostan, Russia. The population was 16 as of 2010. There is 1 street.

== Geography ==
Chipchikovo is located 10 km northeast of Starobaltachevo (the district's administrative centre) by road. Mishcherovo is the nearest rural locality.
