= Mishcherovo =

Mishcherovo Мищерово
- Village
- Location within Bashkortostan Location within Russia
- Coordinates: 56°03′N 55°58′E
- Country: Russia
- Region: Bashkortostan
- District: Baltachevsky District
- Time zone: UTC+5:00

Mishcherovo (Russian: Мищерово; Bashkir: Мишәр, Mişär) is a rural locality (a village) in Toshkurovsky Selsoviet, Baltachevsky District, Bashkortostan, Russia. The population was 164 as of 2010. There are 5 streets.

== Geography ==
Mishcherovo is located 9 km north of Starobaltachevo (the district's administrative centre) by road. Chipchikovo is the nearest rural locality.
