= Toshkurovo =

Toshkurovo Тошкурово
- Village
- Location within Bashkortostan Location within Russia
- Coordinates: 56°06′N 56°04′E
- Country: Russia
- Region: Bashkortostan
- District: Baltachevsky District
- Time zone: UTC+5:00

Toshkurovo (Russian: Тошкурово; Bashkir: Тушҡыр, Tuşqır) is a rural locality (a village) and the administrative centre of Toshkurovsky Selsoviet, Baltachevsky District, Bashkortostan, Russia. The population was 436 as of 2010. There are 12 streets.

== Geography ==
Toshkurovo is located 18 km northeast of Starobaltachevo (the district's administrative centre) by road. Shtandy and Asavka are the nearest rural localities.
