= Bulyak =

Bulyak Буляк
- Village
- Location within Bashkortostan Location within Russia
- Coordinates: 56°03′N 55°42′E
- Country: Russia
- Region: Bashkortostan
- District: Baltachevsky District
- Time zone: UTC+5:00

Bulyak (Russian: Буляк; Bashkir: Бүләк, Büläk) is a rural locality (a village) in Tuchubayevsky Selsoviet, Baltachevsky District, Bashkortostan, Russia. The population was 20 as of 2010. There is 1 street.

== Geography ==
Bulyak is located 26 km northwest of Starobaltachevo (the district's administrative centre) by road. Tykanovo is the nearest rural locality.
