= Urazayevo =

Urazayevo Уразаево
- Village
- Location within Bashkortostan Location within Russia
- Coordinates: 55°54′N 56°06′E
- Country: Russia
- Region: Bashkortostan
- District: Baltachevsky District
- Time zone: UTC+5:00

Urazayevo (Russian: Уразаево; Bashkir: Уразай, Urazay) is a rural locality (a village) in Staroyanbayevsky Selsoviet, Baltachevsky District, Bashkortostan, Russia. The population was 420 as of 2010. There are 8 streets. Urazayevo is located 18 km southeast of Starobaltachevo (the district's administrative centre) by road. Staroyanbayevo is the nearest rural locality.
