= Rakhimkulovo =

Rakhimkulovo Рахимкулово
- Village
- Location within Bashkortostan Location within Russia
- Coordinates: 55°48′N 56°11′E
- Country: Russia
- Region: Bashkortostan
- District: Baltachevsky District
- Time zone: UTC+5:00

Rakhimkulovo (Russian: Рахимкулово; Bashkir: Рәхимҡол, Räximqol) is a rural locality (a village) in Kundashlinsky Selsoviet, Baltachevsky District, Bashkortostan, Russia. There is 1 street.

== Census ==
The population was 45 as of 2010.

== Geography ==
Rakhimkulovo is located 34 km southeast of Starobaltachevo (the district's administrative centre) by road. Kundashly is the nearest rural locality.
