= Tibelevo =

Tibelevo Тибелево
- Village
- Location within Bashkortostan Location within Russia
- Coordinates: 56°04′N 55°52′E
- Country: Russia
- Region: Bashkortostan
- District: Baltachevsky District
- Time zone: UTC+5:00

Tibelevo (Russian: Тибелево; Bashkir: Тибел, Tibel) is a rural locality (a village) in Shavyadinsky Selsoviet, Baltachevsky District, Bashkortostan, Russia. The population was 189 as of 2010. There are 3 streets.

== Geography ==
Tibelevo is located 14 km north of Starobaltachevo (the district's administrative centre) by road. Shavyady is the nearest rural locality.
