= Staroyaksheyevo =

Staroyaksheyevo Староякшеево
- Village
- Location within Bashkortostan Location within Russia
- Coordinates: 56°00′N 55°52′E
- Country: Russia
- Region: Bashkortostan
- District: Baltachevsky District
- Time zone: UTC+5:00

Staroyaksheyevo (Russian: Староякшеево; Bashkir: Иҫке Яҡшый, İśke Yaqşıy) is a rural locality (a village) in Starobaltachevsky Selsoviet, Baltachevsky District, Bashkortostan, Russia. The population was 528 as of 2010. There are 18 streets.

== Geography ==
Staroyaksheyevo is located 3 km west of Starobaltachevo (the district's administrative centre) by road. Starobaltachevo is the nearest rural locality.
