= Kurachevo =

Kurachevo Курачево
- Village
- Location within Bashkortostan Location within Russia
- Coordinates: 55°54′N 56°17′E
- Country: Russia
- Region: Bashkortostan
- District: Baltachevsky District
- Time zone: UTC+5:00

Kurachevo (Russian: Курачево; Bashkir: Ҡурас, Quras) is a rural locality (a village) in Kundashlinsky Selsoviet, Baltachevsky District, Bashkortostan, Russia. The population was 226 as of 2010. There are 6 streets.

== Geography ==
Kurachevo is located 31 km southeast of Starobaltachevo (the district's administrative centre) by road. Novosultangulovo is the nearest rural locality.
