= Novobaltachevo =

Novobaltachevo Новобалтачево
- Village
- Location within Bashkortostan Location within Russia
- Coordinates: 56°02′N 56°01′E
- Country: Russia
- Region: Bashkortostan
- District: Baltachevsky District
- Time zone: UTC+5:00

Novobaltachevo (Russian: Новобалтачево; Bashkir: Яңы Балтас, Yañı Baltas) is a rural locality (a village) in Toshkurovsky Selsoviet, Baltachevsky District, Bashkortostan, Russia. The population was 337 as of 2010. There are 7 streets.

== Geography ==
Novobaltachevo is located 10 km northeast of Starobaltachevo (the district's administrative centre) by road. Tuktayevo is the nearest rural locality.
