= Mata, Baltachevsky District, Republic of Bashkortostan =

Mata Мата
- Village
- Location within Bashkortostan Location within Russia
- Coordinates: 56°04′N 56°12′E
- Country: Russia
- Region: Bashkortostan
- District: Baltachevsky District
- Time zone: UTC+5:00

Mata (Russian: Мата; Bashkir: Маты, Matı) is a rural locality (a village) in Shtandinsky Selsoviet, Baltachevsky District, Bashkortostan, Russia. The population was 407 as of 2010. There are 7 streets.

== Geography ==
Mata is located 23 km northeast of Starobaltachevo (the district's administrative centre) by road. Shtandy is the nearest rural locality.
