= Chukaly =

Chukaly Чукалы
- Village
- Location within Bashkortostan Location within Russia
- Coordinates: 55°53′N 56°12′E
- Country: Russia
- Region: Bashkortostan
- District: Baltachevsky District
- Time zone: UTC+5:00

Chukaly (Russian: Чукалы; Bashkir: Сокалы, Sokalı) is a rural locality (a village) in Staroyanbayevsky Selsoviet, Baltachevsky District, Bashkortostan, Russia. The population was 119 as of 2010. There are 6 streets.

== Geography ==
Chukaly is located 25 km southeast of Starobaltachevo (the district's administrative centre) by road. Starosultangulovo is the nearest rural locality.
