= Asavka =

Asavka Асавка
- Village
- Location within Bashkortostan Location within Russia
- Coordinates: 56°08′N 56°06′E
- Country: Russia
- Region: Bashkortostan
- District: Baltachevsky District
- Time zone: UTC+5:00

Asavka (Russian: Асавка; Bashkir: Аҫау, Aśaw) is a rural locality (a village) in Toshkurovsky Selsoviet, Baltachevsky District, Bashkortostan, Russia. The population was 416 as of 2010. There are 3 streets.

== Geography ==
Asavka is located 23 km northeast of Starobaltachevo (the district's administrative centre) by road. Mikhaylovka is the nearest rural locality.
