= Churtanlykul =

Churtanlykul Чуртанлыкуль
- Village
- Location within Bashkortostan Location within Russia
- Coordinates: 55°47′N 55°58′E
- Country: Russia
- Region: Bashkortostan
- District: Baltachevsky District
- Time zone: UTC+5:00

Churtanlykul (Russian: Чуртанлыкуль; Bashkir: Суртанлыкүл, Surtanlıkül) is a rural locality (a village) in Nizhnekaryshevsky Selsoviet, Baltachevsky District, Bashkortostan, Russia. The population was 129 as of 2010. There are 4 streets.

== Geography ==
Churtanlykul is located 29 km south of Starobaltachevo (the district's administrative centre) by road. Verkhnekaryshevo is the nearest rural locality.
