= Verkhnekaryshevo =

Verkhnekaryshevo Верхнекарышево
- Village
- Location within Bashkortostan Location within Russia
- Coordinates: 55°48′N 55°58′E
- Country: Russia
- Region: Bashkortostan
- District: Baltachevsky District
- Time zone: UTC+5:00

Verkhnekaryshevo (Russian: Верхнекарышево; Bashkir: Үрге Ҡарыш, Ürge Qarış) is a rural locality (a village) and the administrative centre of Nizhnekaryshevsky Selsoviet, Baltachevsky District, Bashkortostan, Russia. The population was 439 as of 2010. There are 12 streets.

== Geography ==
Verkhnekaryshevo is located 26 km south of Starobaltachevo (the district's administrative centre) by road. Churtanlykul is the nearest rural locality.
