= Seytyakovo =

Seytyakovo Сейтяково
- Selo
- Location within Bashkortostan Location within Russia
- Coordinates: 55°58′N 55°47′E
- Country: Russia
- Region: Bashkortostan
- District: Baltachevsky District
- Time zone: UTC+5:00

Seytyakovo (Russian: Сейтя́ково; Bashkir: Һәйтәк, Häytäk) is a rural locality (a selo) and the administrative centre of Seytyakovsky Selsoviet, Baltachevsky District, Bashkortostan, Russia. The population was 746 as of 2010. There are 19 streets.

== Geography ==
Seytyakovo is located 14 km southwest of Starobaltachevo (the district's administrative centre) by road. Churapanovo is the nearest rural locality.
