= Verkhneivanayevo =

Verkhneivanayevo Верхнеиванаево
- Village
- Location within Bashkortostan Location within Russia
- Coordinates: 55°56′N 56°01′E
- Country: Russia
- Region: Bashkortostan
- District: Baltachevsky District
- Time zone: UTC+5:00

Verkhneivanayevo (Russian: Верхнеиванаево; Bashkir: Үрге Иванай, Ürge İvanay) is a rural locality (a village) in Kuntugushevsky Selsoviet, Baltachevsky District, Bashkortostan, Russia. The population was 296 as of 2010. There are 5 streets.

== Geography ==
Verkhneivanayevo is located 10 km southeast of Starobaltachevo (the district's administrative centre) by road. Nizhneivanayevo is the nearest rural locality.
