= Tykanovo =

Tykanovo Тыканово
- Village
- Location within Bashkortostan Location within Russia
- Coordinates: 56°04′N 55°42′E
- Country: Russia
- Region: Bashkortostan
- District: Baltachevsky District
- Time zone: UTC+5:00

Tykanovo (Russian: Тыканово; Bashkir: Текән, Tekän) is a rural locality (a village) in Shavyadinsky Selsoviet, Baltachevsky District, Bashkortostan, Russia. The population was 96 as of 2010. There are 3 streets.

== Geography ==
Tykanovo is located 26 km northwest of Starobaltachevo (the district's administrative centre) by road. Bulyak is the nearest rural locality.
