= Staryye Kargaly =

Starye Kargaly Старые Каргалы
- Village
- Location within Bashkortostan Location within Russia
- Coordinates: 55°57′N 55°39′E
- Country: Russia
- Region: Bashkortostan
- District: Baltachevsky District
- Time zone: UTC+5:00

Starye Kargaly (Russian: Старые Каргалы; Bashkir: Иҫке Ҡарғалы, İśke Qarğalı) is a rural locality (a village) in Baltachevsky District, Bashkortostan, Russia. The population was 202 as of 2010. There are 6 streets.

== Geography ==
Staryye Kargaly is located 25 km southwest of Starobaltachevo (the district's administrative centre) by road. Tuchubayevo is the nearest rural locality.
