= Tuzlubino =

Tuzlubino Тузлубино
- Village
- Location within Bashkortostan Location within Russia
- Coordinates: 55°59′N 55°57′E
- Country: Russia
- Region: Bashkortostan
- District: Baltachevsky District
- Time zone: UTC+5:00

Tuzlubino (Russian: Тузлубино; Bashkir: Тоҙлоуба, Toźlowba) is a rural locality (a village) in Kuntugushevsky Selsoviet, Baltachevsky District, Bashkortostan, Russia. The population was 245 as of 2010. There are 4 streets.

== Geography ==
Tuzlubino is located 4 km southeast of Starobaltachevo (the district's administrative centre) by road. Starobaltachevo is the nearest rural locality.
