= Shtandy =

Shtandy Штанды
- Village
- Location within Bashkortostan Location within Russia
- Coordinates: 56°04′N 56°08′E
- Country: Russia
- Region: Bashkortostan
- District: Baltachevsky District
- Time zone: UTC+5:00

Shtandy (Russian: Штанды; Bashkir: Штәнде, Ştände) is a rural locality (a village) and the administrative centre of Shtandinsky Selsoviet, Baltachevsky District, Bashkortostan, Russia. The population was 568 as of 2010. There are 10 streets.

== Geography ==
Shtandy is located 19 km northeast of Starobaltachevo (the district's administrative centre) by road. Ardagysh is the nearest rural locality.
