= Shavyady =

Shavyady Шавьяды
- Village
- Location within Bashkortostan Location within Russia
- Coordinates: 56°04′N 55°49′E
- Country: Russia
- Region: Bashkortostan
- District: Baltachevsky District
- Time zone: UTC+5:00

Shavyady (Russian: Шавьяды; Bashkir: Шауъяҙы, Şawyaźı) is a rural locality (a village) and the administrative centre of Shavyadinsky Selsoviet, Baltachevsky District, Bashkortostan, Russia. The population was 269 as of 2010. There are 4 streets.

== Geography ==
Shavyady is located 18 km northwest of Starobaltachevo (the district's administrative centre) by road. Tibelevo is the nearest rural locality.
