= Nizhnekaryshevo =

Nizhnekaryshevo Нижнекарышево
- Selo
- Location within Bashkortostan Location within Russia
- Coordinates: 55°50′N 55°58′E
- Country: Russia
- Region: Bashkortostan
- District: Baltachevsky District
- Time zone: UTC+5:00

Nizhnekaryshevo (Russian: Нижнекарышево; Bashkir: Түбәнге Ҡарыш, Tübänge Qarış) is a rural locality (a selo) in Nizhnekaryshevsky Selsoviet, Baltachevsky District, Bashkortostan, Russia. The population was 387 as of 2010. There are 13 streets.

== Geography ==
Nizhnekaryshevo is located 22 km south of Starobaltachevo (the district's administrative centre) by road. Verkhnekaryshevo is the nearest rural locality.
