= Novodyurtyukeyevo =

Novodyurtyukeyevo Новодюртюкеево
- Village
- Location within Bashkortostan Location within Russia
- Coordinates: 55°56′N 55°45′E
- Country: Russia
- Region: Bashkortostan
- District: Baltachevsky District
- Time zone: UTC+5:00

Novodyurtyukeyevo (Russian: Новодюртюкеево; Bashkir: Яңы Дүртекәй, Yañı Dürtekäy) is a rural locality (a village) in Seytyakovsky Selsoviet, Baltachevsky District, Bashkortostan, Russia. The population was 57 as of 2010. There is 1 street.

== Geography ==
Novodyurtyukeyevo is located 17 km southwest of Starobaltachevo (the district's administrative centre) by road. Seytyakovo is the nearest rural locality.
