= Staroilikeyevo =

Staroilikeyevo Староиликеево
- Village
- Location within Bashkortostan Location within Russia
- Coordinates: 56°02′N 55°57′E
- Country: Russia
- Region: Bashkortostan
- District: Baltachevsky District
- Time zone: UTC+5:00

Staroilikeyevo (Russian: Староиликеево; Bashkir: Иҫке Илекәй, İśke İlekäy) is a rural locality (a village) in Starobaltachevsky Selsoviet, Baltachevsky District, Bashkortostan, Russia. The population was 169 as of 2010. There are 4 streets.

== Geography ==
Staroilikeyevo is located 6 km north of Starobaltachevo (the district's administrative centre) by road. Starobaltachevo is the nearest rural locality.
