= Churapanovo =

Churapanovo Чурапаново
- Village
- Location within Bashkortostan Location within Russia
- Coordinates: 55°59′N 55°49′E
- Country: Russia
- Region: Bashkortostan
- District: Baltachevsky District
- Time zone: UTC+5:00

Churapanovo (Russian: Чурапаново; Bashkir: Сурапан, Surapan) is a rural locality (a village) in Seytyakovsky Selsoviet, Baltachevsky District, Bashkortostan, Russia. The population was 44 as of 2010. There are 4 streets.

== Geography ==
Churapanovo is located 7 km west of Starobaltachevo (the district's administrative centre) by road. Seytakovo is the nearest rural locality.
