= Yakunino =

Yakunino Якунино
- Village
- Location within Bashkortostan Location within Russia
- Coordinates: 55°56′N 56°19′E
- Country: Russia
- Region: Bashkortostan
- District: Baltachevsky District
- Time zone: UTC+5:00

Yakunino (Russian: Якунино) is a rural locality (a village) in Yalangachevsky Selsoviet, Baltachevsky District, Bashkortostan, Russia. The population was 70 as of 2010. There are 2 streets.

== Geography ==
Yakunino is located 38 km southeast of Starobaltachevo (the district's administrative centre) by road. Yalangachevo is the nearest rural locality.
