= Nizhneyanaktayevo =

Nizhneyanaktayevo Нижнеянактаево
- Village
- Location within Bashkortostan Location within Russia
- Coordinates: 55°57′N 55°56′E
- Country: Russia
- Region: Bashkortostan
- District: Baltachevsky District
- Time zone: UTC+5:00

Nizhneyanaktayevo (Russian: Нижнеянактаево; Bashkir: Түбәнге Янаҡтай, Tübänge Yanaqtay) is a rural locality (a village) in Verkhneyanaktayevsky Selsoviet, Baltachevsky District, Bashkortostan, Russia. The population was 89 as of 2010. There are 4 streets.

== Geography ==
Nizhneyanaktayevo is located 7 km south of Starobaltachevo (the district's administrative centre) by road. Verkhneyanaktayevo is the nearest rural locality.
