= Baltachevsky District =

Baltachevsky District Балтачевский район (Russian)
- District

Other transcription(s)
  - Bashkir: Балтаc районы
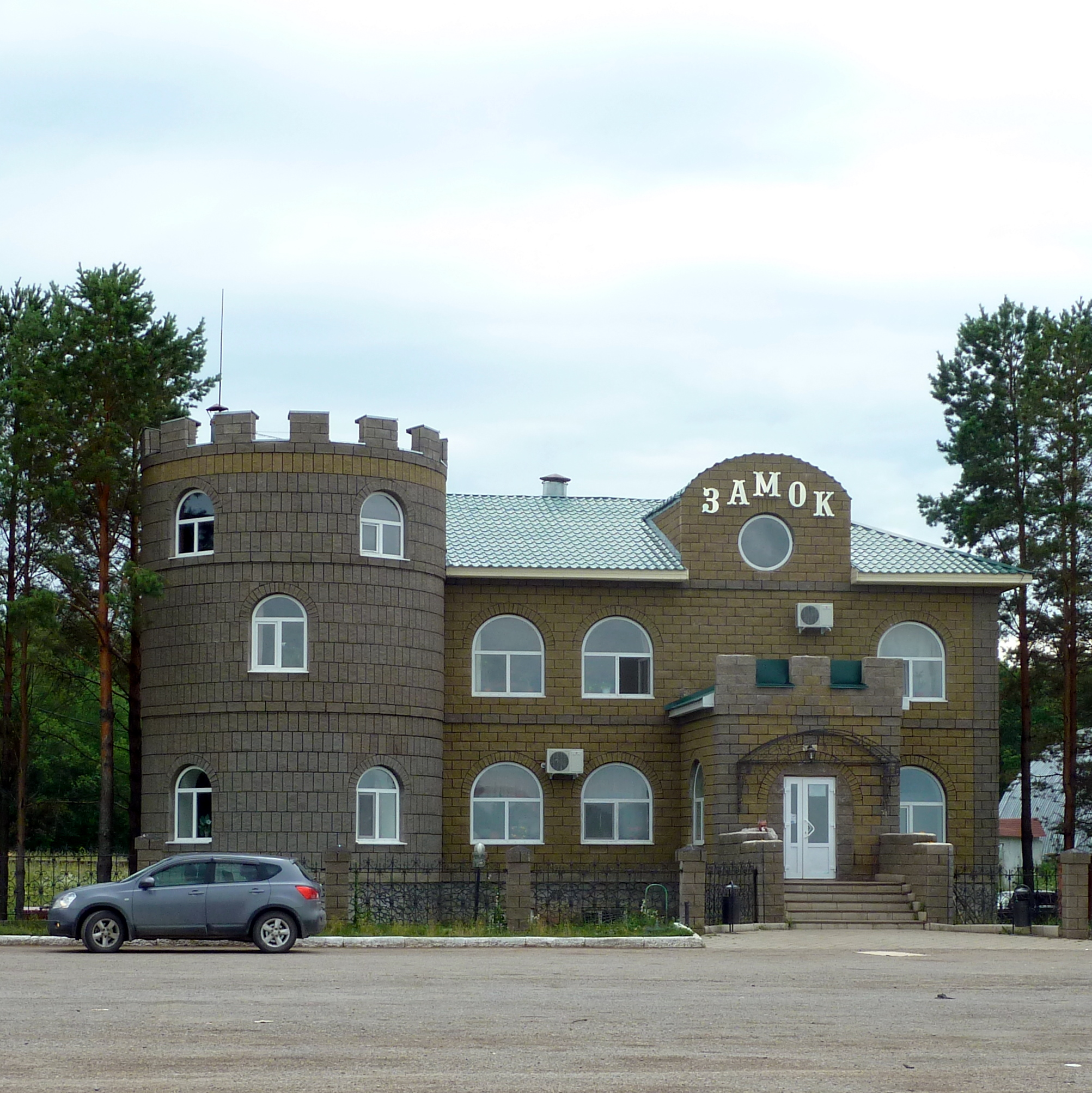
- Cafe "Castle" in Baltachevsky District

- Flag Coat of arms
- Location of Baltachevsky District in the Republic of Bashkortostan
- Coordinates: 56°01′N 55°56′E
- Country: Russia
- Federal subject: Republic of Bashkortostan
- Established: 1930
- Administrative center: Starobaltachevo

Area
  - Total: 1,598 km^{2} (617 sq mi)

Population (2010 Census)
  - Total: 21,623
  - Density: 13.53/km^{2} (35.05/sq mi)
  - Urban: 0%
  - Rural: 100%

Administrative structure
  - Administrative divisions: 15 Selsoviets
  - Inhabited localities: 79 rural localities

Municipal structure
  - Municipally incorporated as: Baltachevsky Municipal District
  - Municipal divisions: 0 urban settlements, 15 rural settlements
- Time zone: UTC+5 (MSK+2)
- OKTMO ID: 80608000
- Website: http://www.baltachmr.ru

Population of Baltachevsky District
- 2010 Census: 21,623
- 2002 Census: 24,695
- 1989 Census: 24,995
- 1979 Census: 32,323

Baltachevsky District (Russian: Балта́чевский райо́н; Bashkir: Балтаc районы, Baltas rayonı; Tatar: Балтач районы, Baltaç rayonı) is an administrative and municipal district (raion), one of the fifty-four in the Republic of Bashkortostan, Russia. It is located in the north of the republic and borders with Tatyshlinsky District in the north, Askinsky and Karaidelsky Districts in the east, Mishkinsky District in the south, and with Burayevsky District in the west. The area of the district is 1,598 square kilometers (617 sq mi). Its administrative center is the rural locality (a selo) of Starobaltachevo. As of the 2010 Census, the total population of the district was 21,623, with the population of Starobaltachevo accounting for 25.9% of that number.

== History ==
The district was established in 1930.

== Administrative and municipal status ==
Within the framework of administrative divisions, Baltachevsky District is one of the fifty-four in the Republic of Bashkortostan. The district is divided into fifteen selsoviets, comprising seventy-nine rural localities. As a municipal division, the district is incorporated as Baltachevsky Municipal District. Its fifteen selsoviets are incorporated as fifteen rural settlements within the municipal district. The selo of Starobaltachevo serves as the administrative center of both the administrative and municipal district.
