= Starobaltachevo, Baltachevsky District, Republic of Bashkortostan =

Rural locality in the Republic of Bashkortostan, Russia

Starobaltachevo Старобалтачево
- Selo

Other transcription(s)
  - Bashkir: Иҫке Балтас
- Interactive map of Starobaltachevo
- Location of Starobaltachevo Starobaltachevo (Bashkortostan)
- Coordinates: 56°00′11″N 55°55′23″E
- Country: Russia
- Federal subject: Bashkortostan
- Administrative district: Baltachevsky District
- SelsovietSelsoviet: Starobaltachevsky Selsoviet

Population (2010 Census)
  - Total: 5,598
  - Estimate (2010): 5,598 (0%)

Administrative status
  - Capital of: Baltachevsky District, Starobaltachevsky Selsoviet

Municipal status
  - Municipal district: Baltachevsky Municipal District
  - Rural settlement: Starobaltachevsky Selsoviet Rural Settlement
  - Capital of: Baltachevsky Municipal District, Starobaltachevsky Selsoviet Rural Settlement
- Time zone: UTC+5 (MSK+2)
- Postal code: 452980
- OKTMO ID: 80608431101

Starobaltachevo (Russian: Старобалтачево, Bashkir: Иҫке Балтас, İśke Baltas) is a rural locality (a selo) and the administrative center of Baltachevsky District of the Republic of Bashkortostan, Russia. Population: 5,598 (2010 census); 5,601 (2002 census); 4,171 (1989 Soviet census).
