= Kildigulovo =

Village in Burzyansky District, Bashkortostan, Russia

Kildigulovo Кильдигулово
- Village
- Location within Bashkortostan Location within Russia
- Coordinates: 53°16′N 57°51′E
- Country: Russia
- Region: Bashkortostan
- District: Burzyansky District
- Time zone: UTC+5:00

Kildigulovo (Russian: Кильдигулово; Bashkir: Килдеғол, Kildeğol) is a rural locality (a village) in Kipchaksky Selsoviet, Burzyansky District, Bashkortostan, Russia. The population was 428 as of 2010. There are 3 streets.

== Geography ==
Kildigulovo is located 54 km northeast of Starosubkhangulovo (the district's administrative centre) by road. Maly Kipchak is the nearest rural locality.
