= Atikovo =

Village in Burzyansky District, Bashkortostan, Russia

Atikovo Атиково
- Village
- Location within Bashkortostan Location within Russia
- Coordinates: 53°00′N 57°21′E
- Country: Russia
- Region: Bashkortostan
- District: Burzyansky District
- Time zone: UTC+5:00

Atikovo (Russian: Атиково; Bashkir: Әтек, Ätäk) is a rural locality (a village) and the administrative centre of Atikovsky Selsoviet, Burzyansky District, Bashkortostan, Russia. The population was 455 as of 2010. There are 4 streets.

== Geography ==
Atikovo is located 24 km southwest of Starosubkhangulovo (the district's administrative centre) by road. Mindigulovo is the nearest rural locality.
