= Bretyak =

Village in Burzyansky District, Bashkortostan, Russia

Bretyak Бретяк
- Village
- Location within Bashkortostan Location within Russia
- Coordinates: 53°32′N 57°12′E
- Country: Russia
- Region: Bashkortostan
- District: Burzyansky District
- Time zone: UTC+5:00

Bretyak (Russian: Бретяк; Bashkir: Берәтәк, Berätäk) is a rural locality (a village) in Askarovsky Selsoviet, Burzyansky District, Bashkortostan, Russia. The population was 424 as of 2010. There are 7 streets.

== Geography ==
Bretyak is located 94 km north of Starosubkhangulovo (the district's administrative centre) by road. Novosaitovo is the nearest rural locality.
