= Novomusyatovo =

Village in Burzyansky District, Bashkortostan, Russia

Novomusyatovo Новомусятово
- Village
- Location within Bashkortostan Location within Russia
- Coordinates: 53°12′N 57°22′E
- Country: Russia
- Region: Bashkortostan
- District: Burzyansky District
- Time zone: UTC+5:00

Novomusyatovo (Russian: Новомусятово; Bashkir: Яңы Мөсәт, Yañı Mösät) is a rural locality (a village) in Starosubkhangulovsky Selsoviet, Burzyansky District, Bashkortostan, Russia. The population was 421 as of 2010. There are 7 streets.

== Geography ==
Novomusyatovo is located 13 km north of Starosubkhangulovo (the district's administrative centre) by road. Staromusyatovo is the nearest rural locality.
