= Timirovo =

Village in Burzyansky District, Bashkortostan, Russia

Timirovo Тимирово
- Village
- Location within Bashkortostan Location within Russia
- Coordinates: 53°10′N 57°32′E
- Country: Russia
- Region: Bashkortostan
- District: Burzyansky District
- Time zone: UTC+5:00

Timirovo (Russian: Тимирово; Bashkir: Тимер, Timer) is a rural locality (a village) in Timirovsky Selsoviet, Burzyansky District, Bashkortostan, Russia. The population was 462 as of 2010. There are 3 streets.

== Geography ==
Timirovo is located 25 km northeast of Starosubkhangulovo (the district's administrative centre) by road. Staromunasipovo is the nearest rural locality.
