= Akbulatovo =

Village in Burzyansky District, Bashkortostan, Russia

Akbulatovo Акбулатово
- Village
- Location within Bashkortostan Location within Russia
- Coordinates: 53°01′N 57°07′E
- Country: Russia
- Region: Bashkortostan
- District: Burzyansky District
- Time zone: UTC+5:00

Akbulatovo (Russian: Акбулатово; Bashkir: Аҡбулат, Aqbulat) is a rural locality (a village) in Kiyekbayevsky Selsoviet, Burzyansky District, Bashkortostan, Russia. The population was 5 as of 2010. There is 1 street.

== Geography ==
Akbulatovo is located 33 km southwest of Starosubkhangulovo (the district's administrative centre) by road. Gadelgareyevo is the nearest rural locality.
