= Muradymovo, Burzyansky District, Republic of Bashkortostan =

Village in Burzyansky District, Bashkortostan, Russia

Muradymovo Мурадымово
- Village
- Location within Bashkortostan Location within Russia
- Coordinates: 53°20′N 57°31′E
- Country: Russia
- Region: Bashkortostan
- District: Burzyansky District
- Time zone: UTC+5:00

Muradymovo (Russian: Мурадымово; Bashkir: Мораҙым, Moraźım) is a rural locality (a village) in Baynazarovsky Selsoviet, Burzyansky District, Bashkortostan, Russia. The population was 374 as of 2010. There are 3 streets.

== Geography ==
Muradymovo is located 35 km north of Starosubkhangulovo (the district's administrative centre) by road. Baynazarovo is the nearest rural locality.
