= Magadeyevo =

Village in Burzyansky District, Bashkortostan, Russia

Magadeyevo Магадеево
- Village
- Location within Bashkortostan Location within Russia
- Coordinates: 53°23′N 57°17′E
- Country: Russia
- Region: Bashkortostan
- District: Burzyansky District
- Time zone: UTC+5:00

Magadeyevo (Russian: Магадеево; Bashkir: Мәһәҙей, Mähäźey) is a rural locality (a village) in Baynazarovsky Selsoviet, Burzyansky District, Bashkortostan, Russia. The population was 319 as of 2010. There are 3 streets.

== Geography ==
Magadeyevo is located 43 km north of Starosubkhangulovo (the district's administrative centre) by road. Yaumbayevo is the nearest rural locality.
