= Kulganino =

Village in Burzyansky District, Bashkortostan, Russia

Kulganino Кулганино
- Village
- Location within Bashkortostan Location within Russia
- Coordinates: 53°21′N 57°56′E
- Country: Russia
- Region: Bashkortostan
- District: Burzyansky District
- Time zone: UTC+5:00

Kulganino (Russian: Кулганино; Bashkir: Ҡолғана, Qolğana) is a rural locality (a village) and the administrative centre of Kulganinsky Selsoviet, Burzyansky District, Bashkortostan, Russia. The population was 288 as of 2010. There are 8 streets.

== Geography ==
Kulganino is located 71 km northeast of Starosubkhangulovo (the district's administrative centre) by road. Sargaya is the nearest rural locality.
