= Maxyutovo =

Village in Burzyansky District, Bashkortostan, Russia

Maxyutovo Максютово
- Village
- Location within Bashkortostan Location within Russia
- Coordinates: 53°00′N 56°57′E
- Country: Russia
- Region: Bashkortostan
- District: Burzyansky District
- Time zone: UTC+5:00

Maxyutovo (Russian: Максютово; Bashkir: Мәҡсүт, Mäqsüt) is a rural locality (a village) in Irgizlinsky Selsoviet, Burzyansky District, Bashkortostan, Russia. The population was 111 as of 2010. There is 1 street.

== Geography ==
Maxyutovo is located 50 km southwest of Starosubkhangulovo (the district's administrative centre) by road. Kutanovo is the nearest rural locality.
