= Nabiyevo =

Village in Burzyansky District, Bashkortostan, Russia

Nabiyevo Набиево
- Village
- Location within Bashkortostan Location within Russia
- Coordinates: 53°15′N 57°32′E
- Country: Russia
- Region: Bashkortostan
- District: Burzyansky District
- Time zone: UTC+5:00

Nabiyevo (Russian: Набиево; Bashkir: Нәби, Näbi) is a rural locality (a village) in Staromunasipovsky Selsoviet, Burzyansky District, Bashkortostan, Russia. The population was 472 as of 2010. There are 8 streets.

== Geography ==
Nabiyevo is located 28 km northeast of Starosubkhangulovo (the district's administrative centre) by road. Kurgashly is the nearest rural locality.
