= Baygazino =

Village in Burzyansky District, Bashkortostan, Russia

Baygazino Байгазино
- Village
- Location within Bashkortostan Location within Russia
- Coordinates: 53°09′N 57°43′E
- Country: Russia
- Region: Bashkortostan
- District: Burzyansky District
- Time zone: UTC+5:00

Baygazino (Russian: Байгазино; Bashkir: Байғаҙы, Bayğaźı) is a rural locality (a village) and the administrative centre of Baygazinsky Selsoviet, Burzyansky District, Bashkortostan, Russia. The population was 360 as of 2010. There are 6 streets.

== Geography ==
Baygazino is located 30 km northeast of Starosubkhangulovo (the district's administrative centre) by road. Novousmanovo is the nearest rural locality.
