= Ishdavletovo =

Village in Burzyansky District, Bashkortostan, Russia

Ishdavletovo Ишдавлетово
- Village
- Location within Bashkortostan Location within Russia
- Coordinates: 53°04′N 57°25′E
- Country: Russia
- Region: Bashkortostan
- District: Burzyansky District
- Time zone: UTC+5:00

Ishdavletovo (Russian: Ишдавлетово; Bashkir: Ишдәүләт, İşdäwlät) is a rural locality (a village) in Starosubkhangulovsky Selsoviet, Burzyansky District, Bashkortostan, Russia. The population was 29 as of 2010. There are 4 streets.

== Geography ==
Ishdavletovo is located 7 km south of Starosubkhangulovo (the district's administrative centre) by road. Starosubkhangulovo is the nearest rural locality.
