= Irgizly =

Village in Burzyansky District, Bashkortostan, Russia

Irgizly Иргизлы
- Village
- Location within Bashkortostan Location within Russia
- Coordinates: 52°57′31″N 57°01′37″E
- Country: Russia
- Region: Bashkortostan
- District: Burzyansky District
- Time zone: UTC+5:00

Irgizly (Russian: Иргизлы; Bashkir: Ырғыҙлы, Irğıźlı) is a rural locality (a village) and the administrative centre of Irgizlinsky Selsoviet, Burzyansky District, Bashkortostan, Russia. The population was 366 as of 2010. There are 9 streets.

== Geography ==
Irgizly is located 51 km northwest of Starosubkhangulovo (the district's administrative centre) by road. Kutanovo is the nearest rural locality.
