= Novomunasipovo =

Village in Burzyansky District, Bashkortostan, Russia

Novomunasipovo Новомунасипово
- Village
- Location within Bashkortostan Location within Russia
- Coordinates: 53°14′N 57°32′E
- Country: Russia
- Region: Bashkortostan
- District: Burzyansky District
- Time zone: UTC+5:00

Novomunasipovo (Russian: Новомунасипово; Bashkir: Яңы Монасип, Yañı Monasip) is a rural locality (a village) in Staromunasipovsky Selsoviet, Burzyansky District, Bashkortostan, Russia. The population was 327 as of 2010. There are 4 streets.

== Geography ==
Novomunasipovo is located 25 km northeast of Starosubkhangulovo (the district's administrative centre) by road. Staromunasipovo is the nearest rural locality.
