= Verkhny Nugush =

Village in Burzyansky District, Bashkortostan, Russia

Verkhny Nugush Верхний Нугуш
- Village
- Location within Bashkortostan Location within Russia
- Coordinates: 53°12′N 56°57′E
- Country: Russia
- Region: Bashkortostan
- District: Burzyansky District
- Time zone: UTC+5:00

Verkhny Nugush (Russian: Верхний Нугуш; Bashkir: Үрге Нөгөш, Ürge Nögöş) is a rural locality (a village) in Galiakberovsky Selsoviet, Burzyansky District, Bashkortostan, Russia. The population was 56 as of 2010. There is 1 street.

== Geography ==
Verkhny Nugush is located 52 km northwest of Starosubkhangulovo (the district's administrative centre) by road. Galiakberovo is the nearest rural locality.
