= Galiakberovo =

Village in Burzyansky District, Bashkortostan, Russia

Galiakberovo Галиакберово
- Village
- Location within Bashkortostan Location within Russia
- Coordinates: 53°15′N 57°03′E
- Country: Russia
- Region: Bashkortostan
- District: Burzyansky District
- Time zone: UTC+5:00

Galiakberovo (Russian: Галиакберово; Bashkir: Ғәлиәкбәр, Ğäliäkbär) is a rural locality (a village) and the administrative centre of Galiakberovsky Selsoviet, Burzyansky District, Bashkortostan, Russia. The population was 483 as of 2010. There are 7 streets.

== Geography ==
Galiakberovo is located 41 km northwest of Starosubkhangulovo (the district's administrative centre) by road. Verkhny Nugush is the nearest rural locality.
