= Abdulmambetovo, Burzyansky District, Bashkortostan =

Village in Burzyansky District, Bashkortostan, Russia

Abdulmambetovo Абдулмамбетово Әбделмәмбәт Äbdelmämbät
- Village
- Location within Bashkortostan Location within Russia
- Coordinates: 53°16′N 57°43′E
- Country: Russia
- Region: Bashkortostan
- District: Burzyansky District
- Time zone: [[UTC+5:00]]

Abdulmambetovo (Russian: Абдулмамбетово; Bashkir: Әбделмәмбәт, Äbdelmämbät) is a rural locality (a village) and the administrative centre of Kipchaksky Selsoviet of Burzyansky District, Bashkortostan, Russia. The population was 629 as of 2010. There are 12 streets.

== Geography ==
Abdulmambetovo is located 44 km northeast of Starosubkhangulovo (the district's administrative centre) by road. Maly Kipchak is the nearest rural locality.
