= Novosubkhangulovo =

Village in Burzyansky District, Bashkortostan, Russia

Novosubkhangulovo Новосубхангулово
- Village
- Location within Bashkortostan Location within Russia
- Coordinates: 53°08′N 57°26′E
- Country: Russia
- Region: Bashkortostan
- District: Burzyansky District
- Time zone: UTC+5:00

Novosubkhangulovo (Russian: Новосубхангулово; Bashkir: Яңы Собханғол, Yañı Sobxanğol) is a rural locality (a village) in Starosubkhangulovsky Selsoviet, Burzyansky District, Bashkortostan, Russia. The population was 525 as of 2010. There are 18 streets.

== Geography ==
Novosubkhangulovo is located 7 km north of Starosubkhangulovo (the district's administrative centre) by road. Staromusyatovo is the nearest rural locality.
