= Novousmanovo =

Village in Burzyansky District, Bashkortostan, Russia

Novousmanovo Новоусманово
- Village
- Location within Bashkortostan Location within Russia
- Coordinates: 53°04′N 57°39′E
- Country: Russia
- Region: Bashkortostan
- District: Burzyansky District
- Time zone: UTC+5:00

Novousmanovo (Russian: Новоусманово; Bashkir: Яңы Уҫман, Yañı Uśman) is a rural locality (a village) in Baygazinsky Selsoviet, Burzyansky District, Bashkortostan, Russia. The population was 414 as of 2010. There are 7 streets.

== Geography ==
Novousmanovo is located 38 km east of Starosubkhangulovo (the district's administrative centre) by road. Baygazino is the nearest rural locality.
