= Kiyekbayevo =

Village in Burzyansky District, Bashkortostan, Russia

Kiyekbayevo Киекбаево
- Village
- Location within Bashkortostan Location within Russia
- Coordinates: 53°02′N 57°15′E
- Country: Russia
- Region: Bashkortostan
- District: Burzyansky District
- Time zone: UTC+5:00

Kiyekbayevo (Russian: Киекбаево; Bashkir: Кейекбай, Keyekbay) is a rural locality (a village) and the administrative centre of Kiyekbayevsky Selsoviet, Burzyansky District, Bashkortostan, Russia. The population was 296 as of 2010. There are 4 streets.

== Geography ==
Kiyekbayevo is located 18 km southwest of Starosubkhangulovo (the district's administrative centre) by road. Mindigulovo is the nearest rural locality.
