= Sargaya, Republic of Bashkortostan =

Village in Burzyansky District, Bashkortostan, Russia

Sargaya Саргая
- Village
- Location within Bashkortostan Location within Russia
- Coordinates: 53°20′N 57°47′E
- Country: Russia
- Region: Bashkortostan
- District: Burzyansky District
- Time zone: UTC+5:00

Sargaya (Russian: Саргая; Bashkir: Һарғая, Harğaya) is a rural locality (a village) in Kulganinsky Selsoviet, Burzyansky District, Bashkortostan, Russia. The population was 146 as of 2010.

== Geography ==
Sargaya is located 50 km northeast of Starosubkhangulovo (the district's administrative centre) by road. Yaumbayevo is the nearest rural locality.
