= Askarovo =

Askarovo (Russian: Аскарово) is the name of several rural localities in Russia:

- Askarovo, Abzelilovsky District, Republic of Bashkortostan, a selo in Abzelilovsky District of the Republic of Bashkortostan
- Askarovo, Burzyansky District, Republic of Bashkortostan, a village in Burzyansky District of the Republic of Bashkortostan
- Askarovo, Kurgan Oblast, a village in Kurgan Oblast
- Askarovo, Orenburg Oblast, a village in Orenburg Oblast
