= Islambayevo =

Village in Burzyansky District, Bashkortostan, Russia

Islambayevo Исламбаево
- Village
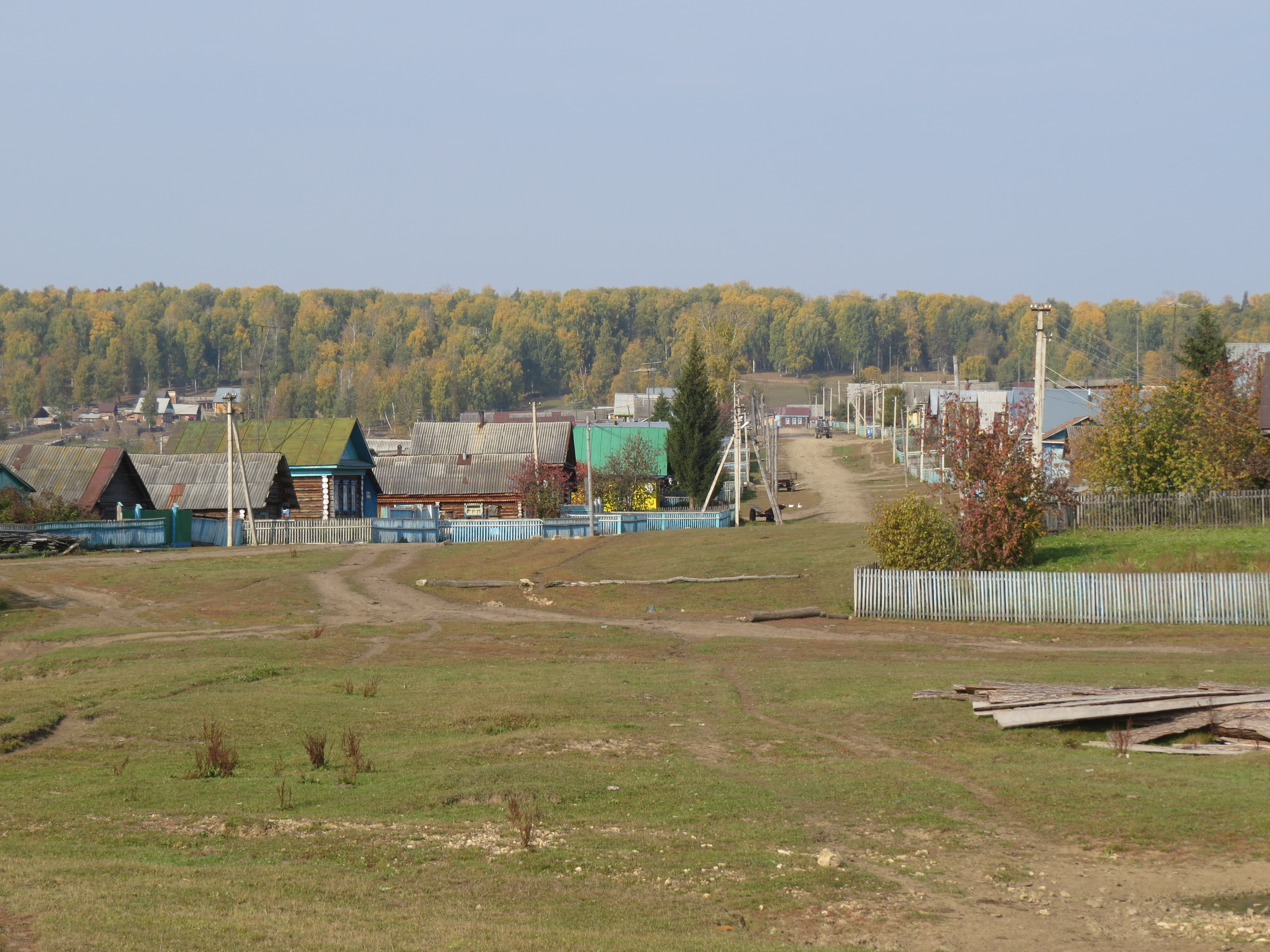

- Location within Bashkortostan Location within Russia
- Coordinates: 53°24′N 57°17′E
- Country: Russia
- Region: Bashkortostan
- District: Burzyansky District
- Time zone: UTC+5:00

Islambayevo (Russian: Исламбаево; Bashkir: Исламбай, İslambay) is a rural locality (a village) in Askarovsky Selsoviet, Burzyansky District, Bashkortostan, Russia. The population was 359 as of 2010. There are 5 streets.

== Geography ==
Islambayevo is located 42 km north of Starosubkhangulovo (the district's administrative centre) by road. Askarovo is the nearest rural locality.
