= Gadelgareyevo =

Village in Burzyansky District, Bashkortostan, Russia

Gadelgareyevo Гадельгареево
- Village
- Location within Bashkortostan Location within Russia
- Coordinates: 53°04′N 57°02′E
- Country: Russia
- Region: Bashkortostan
- District: Burzyansky District
- Time zone: UTC+5:00

Gadelgareyevo (Russian: Гадельгареево; Bashkir: Ғәҙелгәрәй, Ğäźelgäräy) is a rural locality (a village) in Kiyekbayevsky Selsoviet, Burzyansky District, Bashkortostan, Russia. The population was 435 as of 2010. There are 4 streets.

== Geography ==
Gadelgareyevo is located 34 km west of Starosubkhangulovo (the district's administrative centre) by road. Kutanovo is the nearest rural locality.
