= Kurgashly =

Village in Burzyansky District, Bashkortostan, Russia

Kurgashly Кургашлы
- Village
- Location within Bashkortostan Location within Russia
- Coordinates: 53°16′N 57°32′E
- Country: Russia
- Region: Bashkortostan
- District: Burzyansky District
- Time zone: UTC+5:00

Kurgashly (Russian: Кургашлы; Bashkir: Ҡурғашлы, Qurğaşlı) is a rural locality (a village) in Baynazarovsky Selsoviet, Burzyansky District, Bashkortostan, Russia. The population was 307 as of 2010. There are 7 streets.

== Geography ==
Kurgashly is located 26 km north of Starosubkhangulovo (the district's administrative centre) by road. Baynazarovo is the nearest rural locality.
