= Staromunasipovo =

Village in Burzyansky District, Bashkortostan, Russia

Staromunasipovo Старомунасипово
- Village
- Location within Bashkortostan Location within Russia
- Coordinates: 53°13′N 57°34′E
- Country: Russia
- Region: Bashkortostan
- District: Burzyansky District
- Time zone: UTC+5:00

Staromunasipovo (Russian: Старомунасипово; Bashkir: Иҫке Монасип, İśke Monasip) is a rural locality (a village) in Staromunasipovsky Selsoviet, Burzyansky District, Bashkortostan, Russia. The population was 635 as of 2010. There are 12 streets.

== Geography ==
Staromunasipovo is located 25 km northeast of Starosubkhangulovo (the district's administrative centre) by road. Novomunasipovo is the nearest rural locality.
