= Yaumbayevo =

Village in Burzyansky District, Bashkortostan, Russia

Yaumbayevo Яумбаево
- Village
- Location within Bashkortostan Location within Russia
- Coordinates: 53°19′N 57°38′E
- Country: Russia
- Region: Bashkortostan
- District: Burzyansky District
- Time zone: UTC+5:00

Yaumbayevo (Russian: Яумбаево; Bashkir: Яуымбай, Yawımbay) is a rural locality (a village) in Baynazarovsky Selsoviet, Burzyansky District, Bashkortostan, Russia. The population was 436 as of 2010. There are 8 streets.

== Geography ==
Yaumbayevo is located 35 km northeast of Starosubkhangulovo (the district's administrative centre) by road. Baynazarovo is the nearest rural locality.
