= Staromusyatovo =

Village in Burzyansky District, Bashkortostan, Russia

Staromusyatovo Старомусятово
- Village
- Location within Bashkortostan Location within Russia
- Coordinates: 53°09′N 57°25′E
- Country: Russia
- Region: Bashkortostan
- District: Burzyansky District
- Time zone: UTC+5:00

Staromusyatovo (Russian: Старомусятово; Bashkir: Иҫке Мөсәт, İśke Mösät) is a rural locality (a village) in Starosubkhangulovsky Selsoviet, Burzyansky District, Bashkortostan, Russia. The population was 268 as of 2010. There are 12 streets.

== Geography ==
Staromusyatovo is located 8 km (5.0 mi) north of Starosubkhangulovo (the district's administrative centre) by road. Novosubkhangulovo is the nearest rural locality.
