= Bashkiriya Nature Reserve =

Nature reserve in Bashkortostan, Russia

Bashkirsky Nature Reserve
- Russian: Башкирский заповедник
- IUCN category Ia (strict nature reserve)
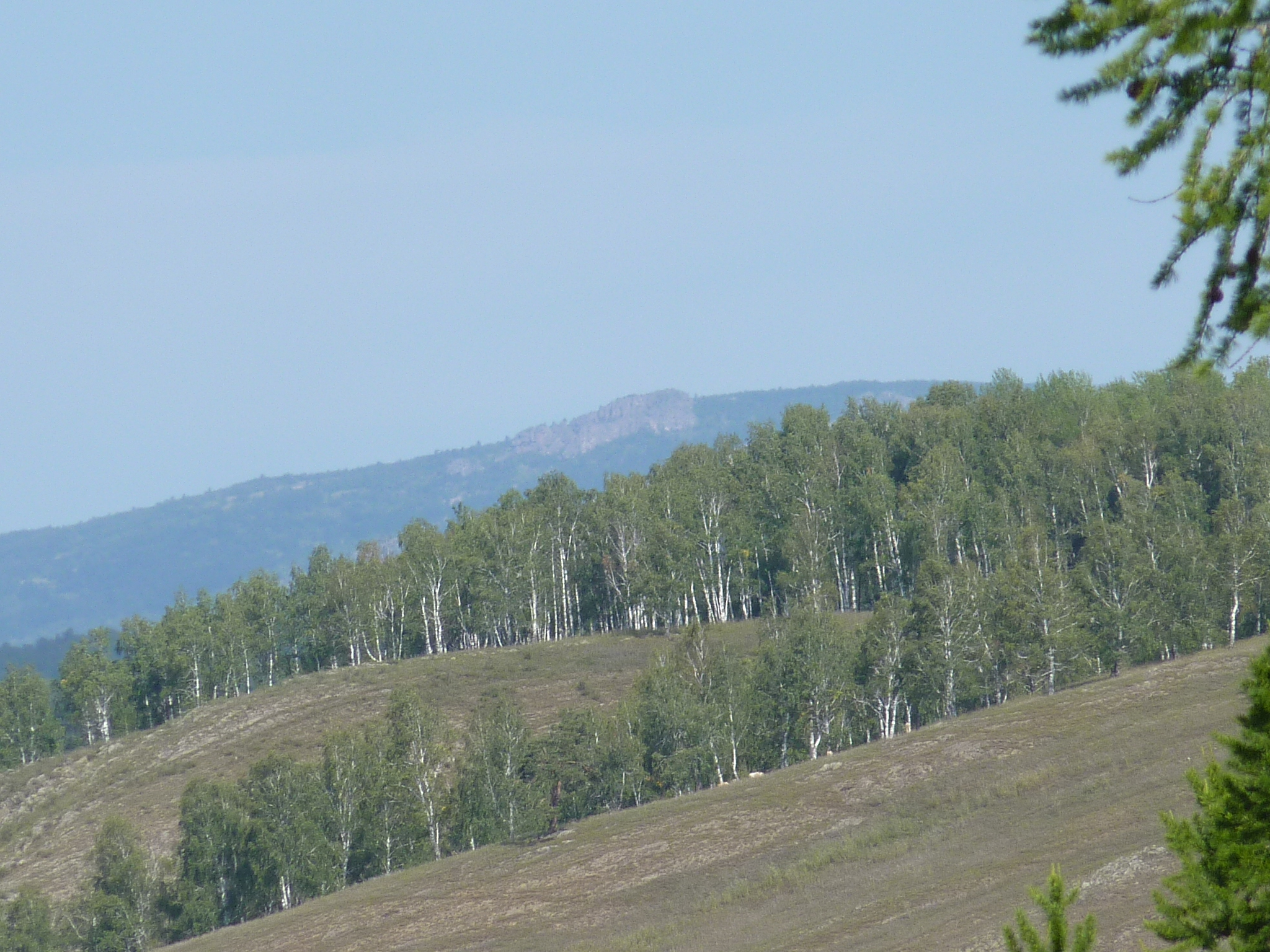
- Bashkirsky Zapovednik

- Location within Russia
- Location: Bashkortostan
- Nearest city: Starosubkhangulovo
- Coordinates: 53°20′44″N 57°46′40″E
- Area: 49,609 hectares (122,587 acres; 192 sq mi)
- Established: 1930
- Governing body: Ministry of Natural Resources and Environment (Russia)
- Website: http://www.bashzapovednik.ru/

Bashkirsky Nature Reserve (Zapovednik) (Russian: Башкирский) (Bashkir: Башҡортостан дәүләт ҡурсаулығы) is located in the central part of the Bashkir (Southern) Urals. It features forested mountain slopes from the western slopes of the southern Ural Mountains to the Kaga River, and a displays the transition from mountain forest to steppe-forest. The reserved is situated in the Burzyansky District of Bashkortostan.

== Topography ==
The reserve is bounded to the north by the Kaga River, to the east by the southern spur of the southern Urals, the Uzyan River to the south, and the Kraków mountains to the west. The tops of many ridges are smoothed and covered with forest. The forest stands on the slopes of the mountains in the east of the reserve transition to steppes and meadows in the lower ground.

== Climate and Ecoregion ==
Bashkirski is located at the southern end of the Ural montane forests and tundra ecoregion, which is a meeting zone between European and Asian vegetation zones (across the Urals) (WWF ID #610).

The climate of Bashkirski is Humid continental climate, cool summer (Köppen climate classification Subarctic climate (Dfc)). This climate is characterized by mild summers (only 1-3 months above 10 °C (50.0 °F)) and cold, snowy winters (coldest month below −3 °C (26.6 °F)).

== Flora and fauna ==
Because of its location at the meeting point of several ecoregions, the reserve has high levels of biodiversity. Vegetation include Siberian and European, Central Asian and arctic types. Forests cover 80% of the reserve, mostly with boreal forest forms of pine, and larch, with some sections of the reserve having large stands of birch. Along the lower rivers are strips of alder/willow forest. The reserve records 812 species of vascular plants, 95 species algae, 42 of fungi (macromycetes), 322 of lichens, and 124 of mosses. The animals of the reserve are those typical of the southern Ural forests - brown bear, squirrel, lynx, red squirrel, and grouse. the park has recorded 275 species of vertebrates, including 17 species of fish, 3 of amphibians, 6 of reptiles, and the 196 species of birds and 53 species of mammals. The fast, cold streams support trout.

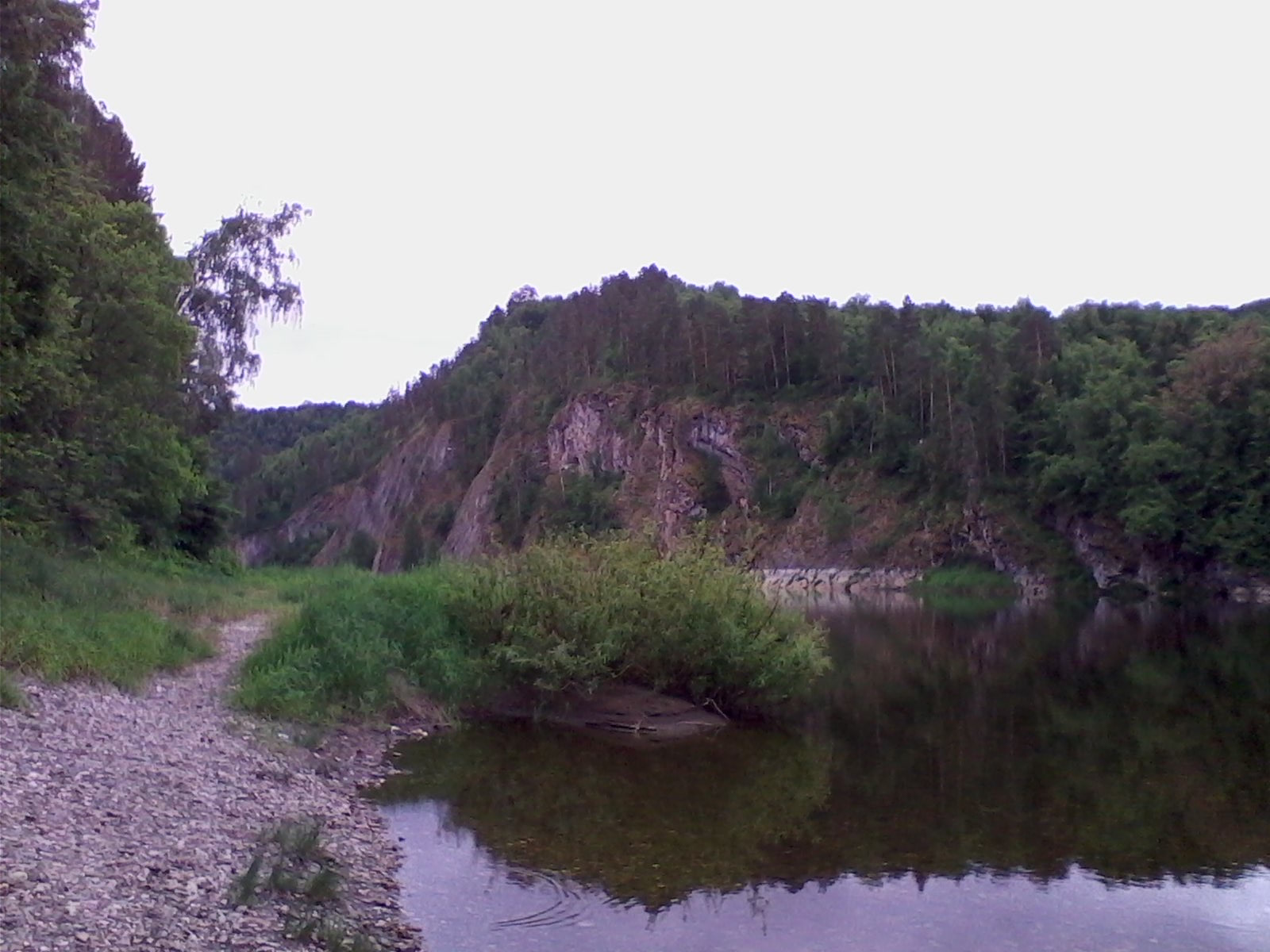
Bashkirsky Nature Reserve

== Management ==
There is a nature museum at the reserve, but visits to the territory itself requires permission from reserve management, and only a limited number of ecological tour routes are allowed to be used with guides.
