= Askarovo, Burzyansky District, Republic of Bashkortostan =

Village in Burzyansky District, Bashkortostan, Russia

Askarovo Аскарово
- Village
- Location within Bashkortostan Location within Russia
- Coordinates: 53°27′N 57°20′E
- Country: Russia
- Region: Bashkortostan
- District: Burzyansky District
- Time zone: UTC+5:00

Askarovo (Russian: Аскарово; Bashkir: Аҫҡар, Aśqar) is a rural locality (a village) and the administrative centre of Askarovsky Selsoviet, Burzyansky District, Bashkortostan, Russia. The population was 487 as of 2010. There are 6 streets.

== Geography ==
Askarovo is located 49 km north of Starosubkhangulovo (the district's administrative centre) by road. Islambayevo is the nearest rural locality.
