= Maly Kipchak =

Village in Burzyansky District, Bashkortostan, Russia

Maly Kipchak Малый Кипчак
- Village
- Location within Bashkortostan Location within Russia
- Coordinates: 53°17′N 57°47′E
- Country: Russia
- Region: Bashkortostan
- District: Burzyansky District
- Time zone: UTC+5:00

Maly Kipchak (Russian: Малый Кипчак; Bashkir: Бәләкәй Ҡыпсаҡ, Bäläkäy Qıpsaq) is a rural locality (a village) in Kipchaksky Selsoviet, Burzyansky District, Bashkortostan, Russia. The population was 57 as of 2010. There are 2 streets.

== Geography ==
Maly Kipchak is located 49 km northeast of Starosubkhangulovo (the district's administrative centre) by road. Abdulmambetovo is the nearest rural locality.
