= Mindigulovo =

Village in Burzyansky District, Bashkortostan, Russia

Mindigulovo Миндигулово
- Village
- Location within Bashkortostan Location within Russia
- Coordinates: 53°03′N 57°20′E
- Country: Russia
- Region: Bashkortostan
- District: Burzyansky District
- Time zone: UTC+5:00

Mindigulovo (Russian: Миндигулово; Bashkir: Мәндәғол, Mändäğol) is a rural locality (a village) in Kiyekbayevsky Selsoviet, Burzyansky District, Bashkortostan, Russia. The population was 85 as of 2010. There are 3 streets.

== Geography ==
Mindigulovo is located 11 km southwest of Starosubkhangulovo (the district's administrative centre) by road. Kiyekbayevo is the nearest rural locality.
