= Kutanovo =

Village in Burzyansky District, Bashkortostan, Russia

Kutanovo Кутаново
- Village
- Location within Bashkortostan Location within Russia
- Coordinates: 52°58′N 57°01′E
- Country: Russia
- Region: Bashkortostan
- District: Burzyansky District
- Time zone: UTC+5:00

Kutanovo (Russian: Кутаново; Bashkir: Ҡотан, Qotan) is a rural locality (a village) in Irgizlinsky Selsoviet, Burzyansky District, Bashkortostan, Russia. The population was 317 as of 2010. There are 6 streets.

== Geography ==
Kutanovo is located 48 km southwest of Starosubkhangulovo (the district's administrative centre) by road. Irgizly is the nearest rural locality.
