= Baynazarovo =

Village in Burzyansky District, Bashkortostan, Russia

Baynazarovo Байназарово
- Village
- Location within Bashkortostan Location within Russia
- Coordinates: 53°17′N 57°32′E
- Country: Russia
- Region: Bashkortostan
- District: Burzyansky District
- Time zone: UTC+5:00

Baynazarovo (Russian: Байназарово; Bashkir: Байназар, Baynazar) is a rural locality (a village) and the administrative centre of Baynazarovsky Selsoviet, Burzyansky District, Bashkortostan, Russia. The population was 1,313 as of 2010. There are 12 streets.

== Geography ==
Baynazarovo is located 29 km north of Starosubkhangulovo (the district's administrative centre) by road. Kurgashly is the nearest rural locality.
