= Novosaitovo =

Novosaitovo Новосаитово
- Village
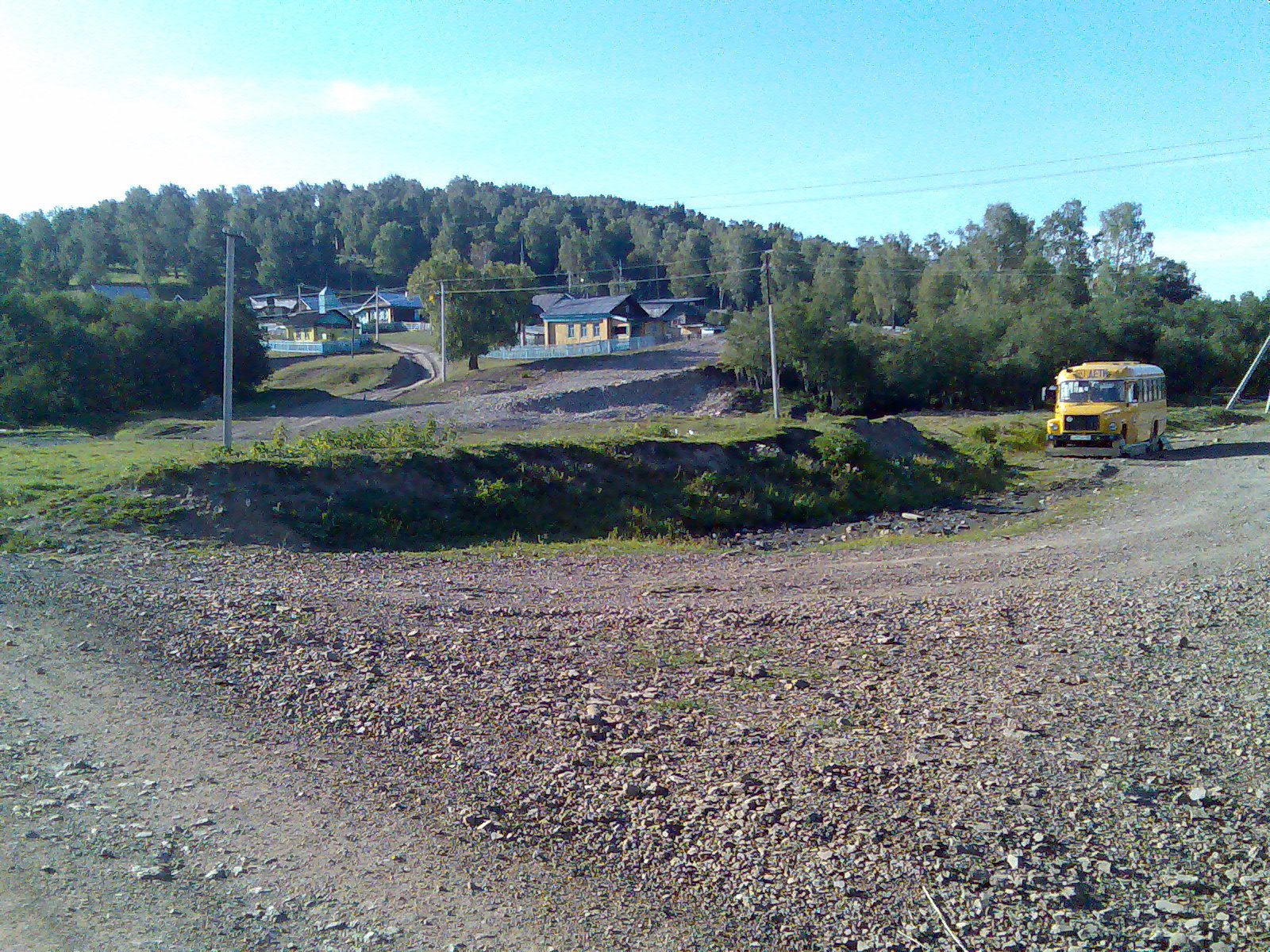

- Location within Bashkortostan Location within Russia
- Coordinates: 53°32′N 57°09′E
- Country: Russia
- Region: Bashkortostan
- District: Ishimbaysky District
- Time zone: UTC+5:00

Novosaitovo (Russian: Новосаитово; Bashkir: Яңы Сәйет, Yañı Säyet) is a rural locality (a village) in Kulguninsky Selsoviet, Ishimbaysky District, Bashkortostan, Russia. The population was 111 as of 2010. There are 2 streets.

== Geography ==
Novosaitovo is located 101 km east of Ishimbay (the district's administrative centre) by road. Bretyak is the nearest rural locality.
