= Starosubkhangulovo =

Selo in Burzyansky District, Bashkortostan, Russia

Starosubkhangulovo Старосубхангулово
- Selo

Other transcription(s)
  - Bashkir: Иҫке Собханғол
- Interactive map of Starosubkhangulovo
- Location of Starosubkhangulovo Starosubkhangulovo (Bashkortostan)
- Coordinates: 53°06′N 57°27′E
- Country: Russia
- Federal subject: Bashkortostan
- Administrative district: Burzyansky District
- SelsovietSelsoviet: Starosubkhangulovsky Selsoviet

Population (2010 Census)
  - Total: 4,609
  - Estimate (2021): 5,245 (+13.8%)

Administrative status
  - Capital of: Burzyansky District, Starosubkhangulovsky Selsoviet

Municipal status
  - Municipal district: Burzyansky Municipal District
  - Rural settlement: Starosubkhangulovsky Selsoviet Rural Settlement
  - Capital of: Burzyansky Municipal District, Starosubkhangulovsky Selsoviet Rural Settlement
- Time zone: UTC+5 (MSK+2)
- Postal code: 453580
- OKTMO ID: 80619425101

Starosubkhangulovo (Russian: Старосубхангулово; Bashkir: Иҫке Собханғол, İśke Sobxanğol) is a rural locality (a selo) and the administrative center of Burzyansky District in the Republic of Bashkortostan, Russia. It is located on the Belaya River. Population: 4,609 (2010 census); 4,343 (2002 census); 3,655 (1989 Soviet census).
