= Burzyansky District =

Burzyansky District Бурзянский район (Russian)
- District

Other transcription(s)
  - Bashkir: Бөрйән районы
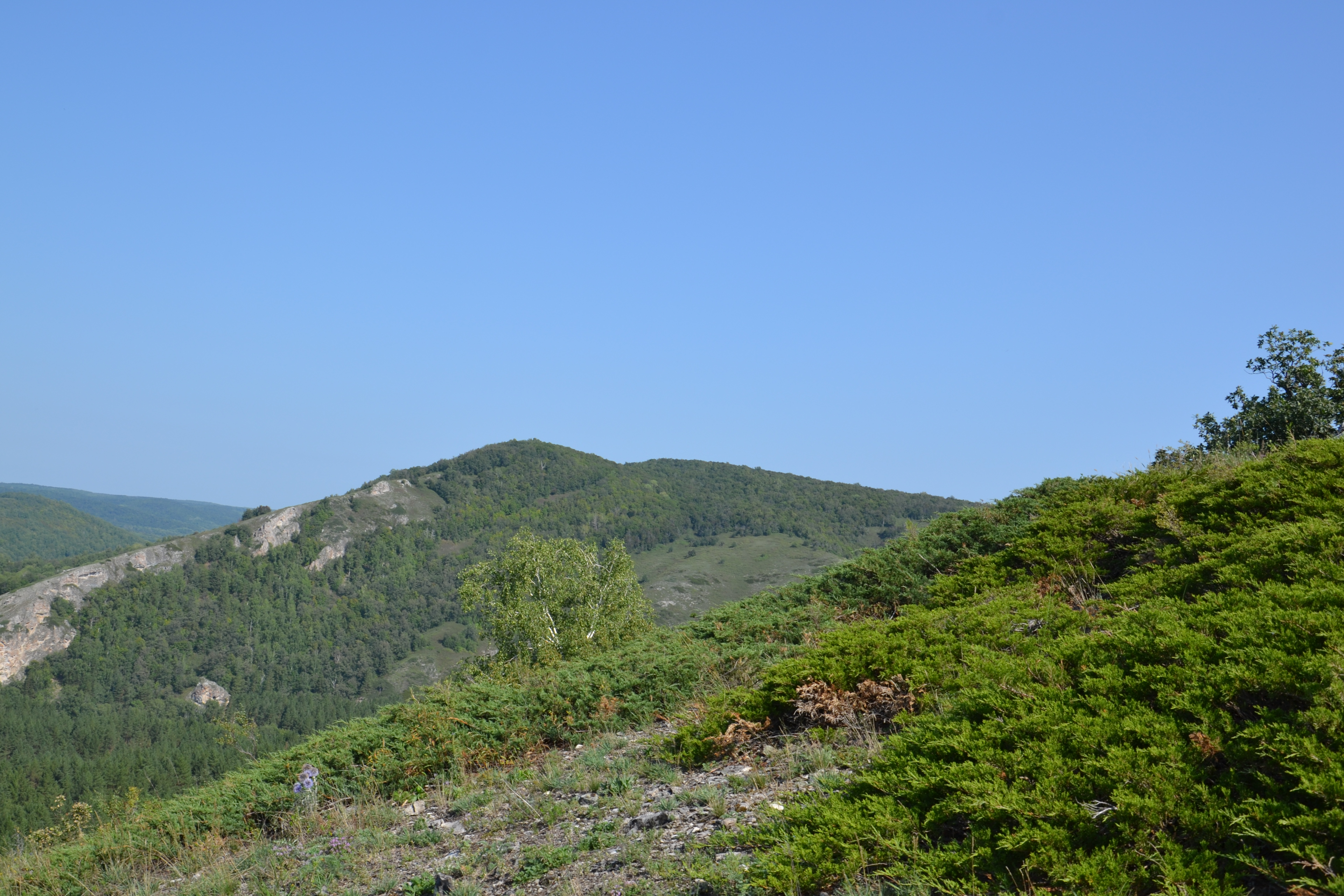
- Muradymovskoe gorge, Burzyansky District

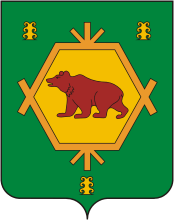
- Flag Coat of arms
- Location of Burzyansky District in the Republic of Bashkortostan
- Coordinates: 53°06′N 57°26′E
- Country: Russia
- Federal subject: Republic of Bashkortostan
- Established: August 20, 1930 (first); November 4, 1965 (second)
- Administrative center: Starosubkhangulovo

Area
  - Total: 4,444 km^{2} (1,716 sq mi)

Population (2010 Census)
  - Total: 16,698
  - Density: 3.757/km^{2} (9.732/sq mi)
  - Urban: 0%
  - Rural: 100%

Administrative structure
  - Administrative divisions: 12 Selsoviets
  - Inhabited localities: 34 rural localities

Municipal structure
  - Municipally incorporated as: Burzyansky Municipal District
  - Municipal divisions: 0 urban settlements, 12 rural settlements
- Time zone: UTC+5 (MSK+2)
- OKTMO ID: 80619000
- Website: http://www.burzyan.ru

Population of Burzyansky District
- 2010 Census: 16,698
- 2002 Census: 16,839
- 1989 Census: 14,072
- 1979 Census: 13,955

Burzyansky District (Russian: Бурзя́нский райо́н; Bashkir: Бөрйән районы, Böryän rayonı) is an administrative and municipal district (raion), one of the fifty-four in the Republic of Bashkortostan, Russia. It is located in the south of the republic and borders with Beloretsky District in the north, Abzelilovsky District in the east, Baymaksky District in the southeast, Zilairsky District in the south, Kugarchinsky District in the southwest, Meleuzovsky District in the west, and with Ishimbaysky District in the west and northwest. The area of the district is 4,444 square kilometers (1,716 sq mi). Its administrative center is the rural locality (a selo) of Starosubkhangulovo. As of the 2010 Census, the total population of the district was 16,698, with the population of Starosubkhangulovo accounting for 27.6% of that number.

== History ==
The district was first established on August 20, 1930. It was merged into Beloretsky Rural District on February 1, 1963, but was restored on November 4, 1965.

The Bashkirsky Nature Reserve (a 'zapovednik' strict nature reserve) is located in District, covering mountainous territory of the Kaga River.

== Administrative and municipal status ==
Within the framework of administrative divisions, Burzyansky District is one of the fifty-four in the Republic of Bashkortostan. The district is divided into twelve selsoviets, comprising thirty-four rural localities. As a municipal division, the district is incorporated as Burzyansky Municipal District. Its twelve selsoviets are incorporated as twelve rural settlements within the municipal district. The selo of Starosubkhangulovo serves as the administrative center of both the administrative and municipal district.
