= Sargayazovo =

Sargayazovo Саргаязово
- Village
- Location within Bashkortostan Location within Russia
- Coordinates: 54°57′N 56°36′E
- Country: Russia
- Region: Bashkortostan
- District: Nurimanovsky District
- Time zone: UTC+5:00

Sargayazovo (Russian: Саргаязово; Bashkir: Һарғаяҙ, Harğayaź) is a rural locality (a village) in Baygildinsky Selsoviet, Nurimanovsky District, Bashkortostan, Russia. The population was 47 as of 2010. There is 1 street.

== Geography ==
Satlyk is located 38 km south of Krasnaya Gorka (the district's administrative centre) by road. Kushkulevo is the nearest rural locality.
