= Ishmuratovo =

Ishmuratovo Ишмуратово
- Village
- Location within Bashkortostan Location within Russia
- Coordinates: 55°04′N 56°48′E
- Country: Russia
- Region: Bashkortostan
- District: Nurimanovsky District
- Time zone: UTC+5:00

Ishmuratovo (Russian: Ишмуратово; Bashkir: Ишморат, İşmorat) is a rural locality (a village) in Staroisayevsky Selsoviet, Nurimanovsky District, Bashkortostan, Russia. The population was 223 as of 2010. There are 3 streets.

== Geography ==
Ishmuratovo is located 21 km southeast of Krasnaya Gorka (the district's administrative centre) by road. Staroisayevo is the nearest rural locality.
