= Bolshetenkashevo =

Bolshetenkashevo Большетенькашево
- Village
- Location within Bashkortostan Location within Russia
- Coordinates: 55°00′N 56°30′E
- Country: Russia
- Region: Bashkortostan
- District: Nurimanovsky District
- Time zone: UTC+5:00

Bolshetenkashevo (Russian: Большетенькашево; Bashkir: Оло Теңкәш, Olo Teñkäş) is a rural locality (a village) in Baygildinsky Selsoviet, Nurimanovsky District, Bashkortostan, Russia. The population was 320 as of 2010. There are 7 streets.

== Geography ==
Bolshetenkashevo is located 27 km southwest of Krasnaya Gorka (the district's administrative centre) by road. Malotenkashevo is the nearest rural locality.
