= Malotenkashevo =

Malotenkashevo Малотенькашево
- Village
- Location within Bashkortostan Location within Russia
- Coordinates: 54°59′N 56°30′E
- Country: Russia
- Region: Bashkortostan
- District: Nurimanovsky District
- Time zone: UTC+5:00

Malotenkashevo (Russian: Малотенькашево; Bashkir: Бәләкәй Теңкәш, Bäläkäy Teñkäş) is a rural locality (a village) in Baygildinsky Selsoviet, Nurimanovsky District, Bashkortostan, Russia. The population was 172 as of 2010. There are 3 streets located within the village.

== Geography ==
Malotenkashevo is located 29 km southwest of Krasnaya Gorka (the district's administrative centre) by road. Bolshetenkashevo is the nearest rural locality.
