= Novoisayevo =

Novoisayevo Новоисаево
- Village
- Location within Bashkortostan Location within Russia
- Coordinates: 55°04′N 56°56′E
- Country: Russia
- Region: Bashkortostan
- District: Nurimanovsky District
- Time zone: UTC+5:00

Novoisayevo (Russian: Новоисаево; Bashkir: Яңы Исай, Yañı İsay) is a rural locality (a village) in Novosubayevsky Selsoviet, Nurimanovsky District, Bashkortostan, Russia. The population was 9 as of 2010. There is 1 street.

== Geography ==
Novoisayevo is located 30 km southeast of Krasnaya Gorka (the district's administrative centre) by road. Ryatush is the nearest rural locality.
