= Verkhnekirovsky =

Verkhnekirovsky Верхнекировский
- Village
- Location within Bashkortostan Location within Russia
- Coordinates: 55°25′N 56°34′E
- Country: Russia
- Region: Bashkortostan
- District: Nurimanovsky District
- Time zone: UTC+5:00

Verkhnekirovsky (Russian: Верхнекировский) is a rural locality (a village) in Pavlovsky Selsoviet, Nurimanovsky District, Bashkortostan, Russia. The population was 32 as of 2010. There is 1 street.

== Geography ==
Verkhnekirovsky is located 41 km north of Krasnaya Gorka (the district's administrative centre) by road. Pavlovka is the nearest rural locality.
