= Yurmash, Nurimanovsky District, Republic of Bashkortostan =

Yurmash Юрмаш
- Village
- Location within Bashkortostan Location within Russia
- Coordinates: 55°10′N 56°45′E
- Country: Russia
- Region: Bashkortostan
- District: Nurimanovsky District
- Time zone: UTC+5:00

Yurmash (Russian: Юрмаш; Bashkir: Юрмаш, Yurmaş) is a rural locality (a village) in Nikolsky Selsoviet, Nurimanovsky District, Bashkortostan, Russia. The population was 82 as of 2010. There is 1 street.

== Geography ==
Yurmash is located 8 km east of Krasnaya Gorka (the district's administrative centre) by road. Baykal is the nearest rural locality.
