= Sarva, Republic of Bashkortostan =

Sarva Сарва
- Village
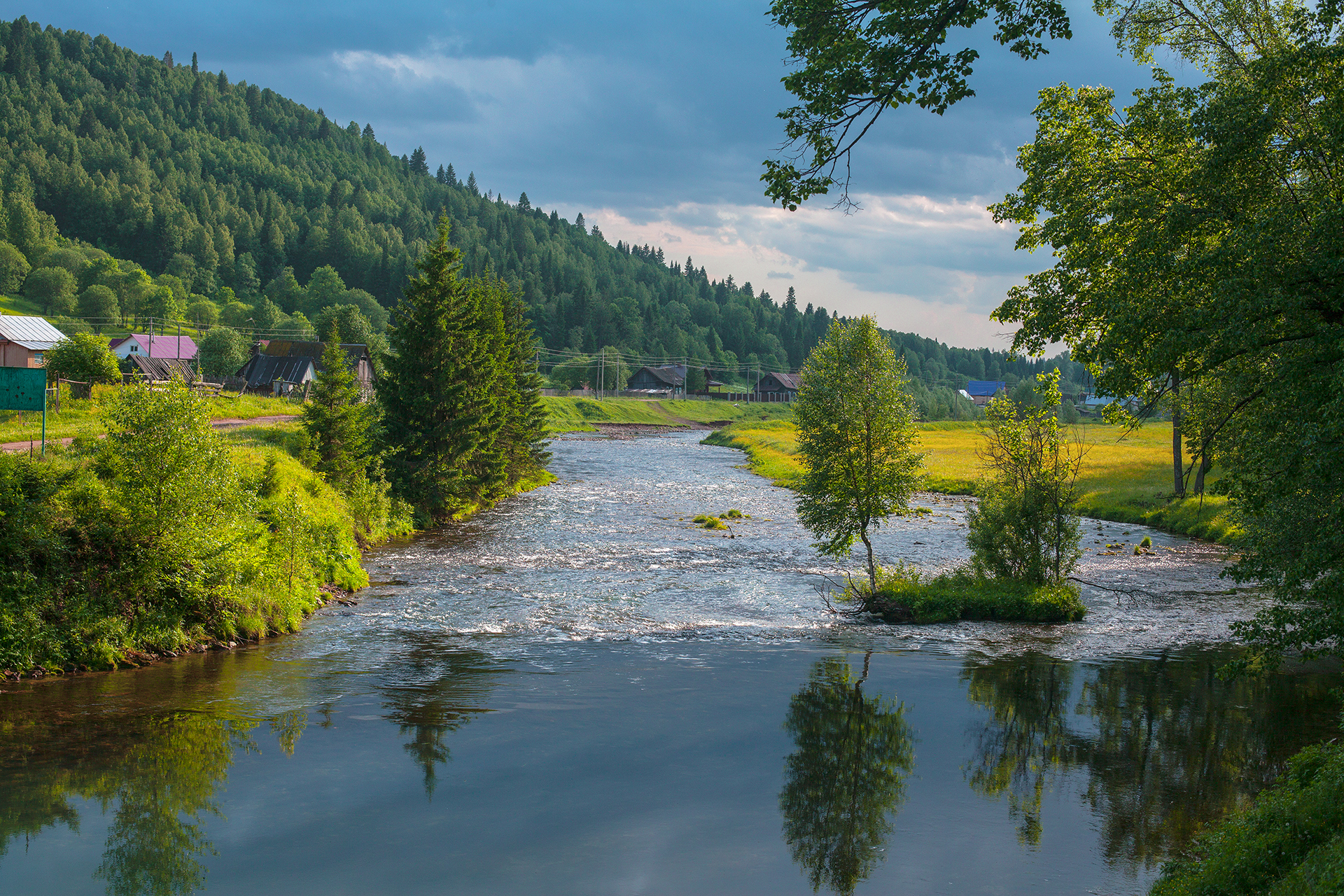
- Sarva River, Nurimanovsky District, Bashkortostan

- Location within Bashkortostan Location within Russia
- Coordinates: 55°14′N 57°02′E
- Country: Russia
- Region: Bashkortostan
- District: Nurimanovsky District
- Time zone: UTC+5:00

Sarva (Russian: Сарва; Bashkir: Саруа, Sarwa) is a rural locality (a village) and the administrative centre of Sarvinsky Selsoviet, Nurimanovsky District, Bashkortostan, Russia. The population was 271 as of 2010. There are 6 streets.

== Geography ==
Sarva is located 27 km east of Krasnaya Gorka (the district's administrative centre) by road. Tiryakle is the nearest rural locality.
