= Kushkulevo =

Kushkulevo Кушкулево
- Village
- Location within Bashkortostan Location within Russia
- Coordinates: 54°58′N 56°36′E
- Country: Russia
- Region: Bashkortostan
- District: Nurimanovsky District
- Time zone: UTC+5:00

Kushkulevo (Russian: Кушкулево; Bashkir: Ҡушкүл, Quşkül) is a rural locality (a village) in Baygildinsky Selsoviet, Nurimanovsky District, Bashkortostan, Russia. The population was 62 as of 2010. There are two streets.

== Geography ==
Kushkulevo is located 37 km south of Krasnaya Gorka (the district's administrative centre) by road. Sargayazovo is the nearest rural locality.
