= Krasny Klyuch, Nurimanovsky District, Republic of Bashkortostan =

Krasny Klyuch Красный Ключ
- Selo
- Location within Bashkortostan Location within Russia
- Coordinates: 55°23′N 56°39′E
- Country: Russia
- Region: Bashkortostan
- District: Nurimanovsky District
- Time zone: UTC+5:00

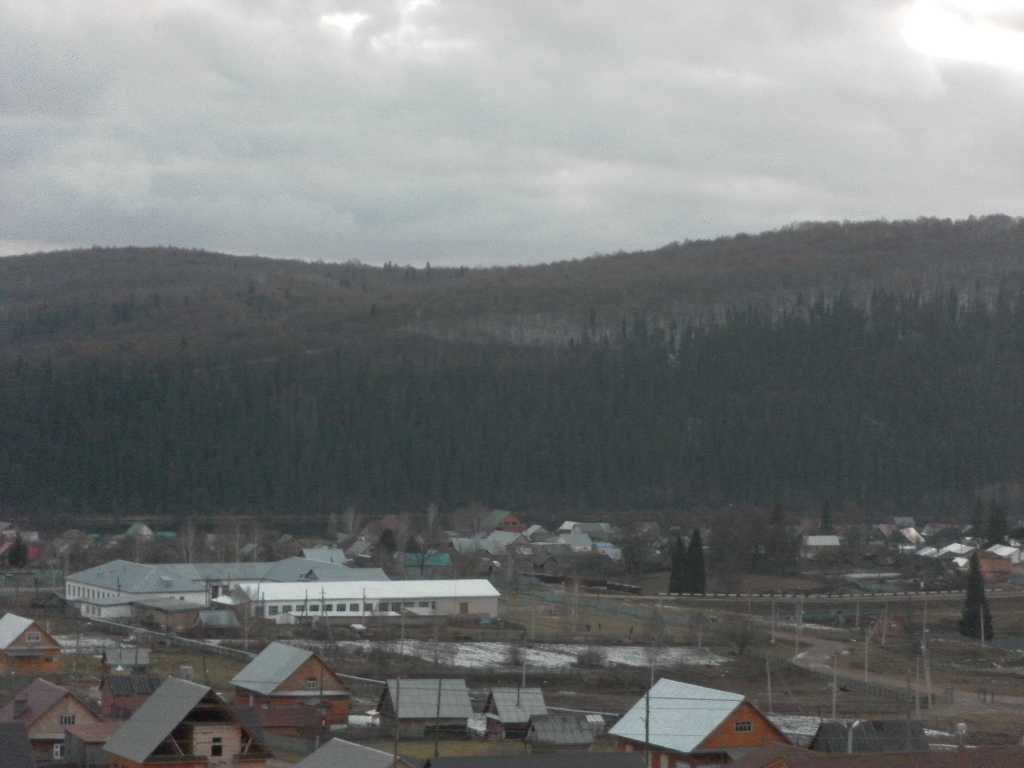

Krasny Klyuch (Russian: Красный Ключ; Bashkir: Ҡыҙыл Шишмә, Qıźıl Şişmä) is a rural locality (a selo) and the administrative centre of Krasnoklyuchevsky Selsoviet, Nurimanovsky District, Bashkortostan, Russia. The population was 2,274 as of 2010. There are 30 streets.

== Geography ==
Krasny Klyuch is located 28 km north of Krasnaya Gorka (the district's administrative centre) by road. Yaman-Port is the nearest rural locality.
