= Gizyatovo =

Gizyatovo Гизятово
- Village
- Location within Bashkortostan Location within Russia
- Coordinates: 55°00′N 56°34′E
- Country: Russia
- Region: Bashkortostan
- District: Nurimanovsky District
- Time zone: UTC+5:00

Gizyatovo (Russian: Гизятово; Bashkir: Ғиззәт, Ğizzät) is a rural locality (a village) in Novokulevsky Selsoviet, Nurimanovsky District, Bashkortostan, Russia. The population was 30 as of 2010. There is 1 street.

== Geography ==
Gizyatovo is located 25 km south of Krasnaya Gorka (the district's administrative centre) by road. Kyzyl-Barzhau is the nearest rural locality.
