= Starokulevo =

Starokulevo Старокулево
- Selo
- Location within Bashkortostan Location within Russia
- Coordinates: 55°07′N 56°38′E
- Country: Russia
- Region: Bashkortostan
- District: Nurimanovsky District
- Time zone: UTC+5:00

Starokulevo (Russian: Старокулево; Bashkir: Иҫке Күл, İśke Kül) is a rural locality (a selo) and the administrative centre of Staroisayevsky Selsoviet, Nurimanovsky District, Bashkortostan, Russia. The population was 721 as of 2010. There are 8 streets.

== Geography ==
Starokulevo is located 9 km south of Krasnaya Gorka (the district's administrative centre) by road. Staroisayevo is the nearest rural locality.
