= Satlyk =

Satlyk Сатлык
- Village
- Location within Bashkortostan Location within Russia
- Coordinates: 55°01′N 56°43′E
- Country: Russia
- Region: Bashkortostan
- District: Nurimanovsky District
- Time zone: UTC+5:00

Satlyk (Russian: Сатлык; Bashkir: Сатлыҡ, Satlıq) is a rural locality (a village) in Novokulevsky Selsoviet, Nurimanovsky District, Bashkortostan, Russia. As of 2010, the population was 80. The village has 1 street.

== Geography ==
Satlyk is located 24 km south of Krasnaya Gorka (the district's administrative centre) by road. Uyankul is the nearest rural locality.
