= Yaman-Port =

Yaman-Port Яман-Порт
- Village
- Location within Bashkortostan Location within Russia
- Coordinates: 55°24′N 56°37′E
- Country: Russia
- Region: Bashkortostan
- District: Nurimanovsky District
- Time zone: UTC+5:00

Yaman-Port (Russian: Яман-Порт; Bashkir: Яманпорт, Yamanport) is a rural locality (a village) in Krasnoklyuchevsky Selsoviet, Nurimanovsky District, Bashkortostan, Russia. The population was 164 as of 2010. There is 1 street.

== Geography ==
Yaman-Port is located 32 km north of Krasnaya Gorka (the district's administrative centre) by road. Ustye Yaman-Yelgi is the nearest rural locality.
