= Kaznatash =

Kaznatash Казнаташ
- Village
- Location within Bashkortostan Location within Russia
- Coordinates: 55°09′N 57°02′E
- Country: Russia
- Region: Bashkortostan
- District: Nurimanovsky District
- Time zone: UTC+5:00

Kaznatash (Russian: Казнаташ; Bashkir: Ҡаҙнаташ, Qaźnataş) is a rural locality (a village) in Novosubayevsky Selsoviet, Nurimanovsky District, Bashkortostan, Russia. The population was 13 as of 2010. There is 1 street.

== Geography ==
Kaznatash is located 27 km east of Krasnaya Gorka (the district's administrative centre) by road. Novy Subay is the nearest rural locality.
