= Chandar, Republic of Bashkortostan =

Chandar Чандар
- Village
- Location within Bashkortostan Location within Russia
- Coordinates: 55°18′N 56°42′E
- Country: Russia
- Region: Bashkortostan
- District: Nurimanovsky District
- Time zone: UTC+5:00

Chandar (Russian: Чандар; Bashkir: Сандар, Sandar) is a rural locality (a village) in Krasnoklyuchevsky Selsoviet, Nurimanovsky District, Bashkortostan, Russia. The population was 220 as of 2010. There are 6 streets.

== Geography ==
Chandar is located 16 km north of Krasnaya Gorka (the district's administrative centre) by road. Emanino is the nearest rural locality.
