= Kargino, Nurimanovsky District, Republic of Bashkortostan =

Kargino Каргино
- Village
- Location within Bashkortostan Location within Russia
- Coordinates: 55°00′N 56°26′E
- Country: Russia
- Region: Bashkortostan
- District: Nurimanovsky District
- Time zone: UTC+5:00

Kargino (Russian: Каргино; Bashkir: Ҡарға, Qarğa) is a rural locality (a village) in Baygildinsky Selsoviet, Nurimanovsky District, Bashkortostan, Russia. The population was 51 as of 2010. There are 5 streets.

== Geography ==
Kargino is located 35 km southwest of Krasnaya Gorka (the district's administrative centre) by road. Bikmurzino is the nearest rural locality.
