= Novokulevo =

Novokulevo Новокулево
- Selo
- Location within Bashkortostan Location within Russia
- Coordinates: 55°04′N 56°37′E
- Country: Russia
- Region: Bashkortostan
- District: Nurimanovsky District
- Time zone: UTC+5:00

Novokulevo (Russian: Новокулево; Bashkir: Яңы Күл, Yañı Kül) is a rural locality (a selo) and the administrative centre of Novokulevsky Selsoviet, Nurimanovsky District, Bashkortostan, Russia. The population was 1,465 as of 2010. There are 28 streets.

== Geography ==
Novokulevo is located 14 km south of Krasnaya Gorka (the district's administrative centre) by road. Nimislyarovo is the nearest rural locality.
