= Novobedeyevo =

Novobedeyevo Новобедеево
- Village
- Location within Bashkortostan Location within Russia
- Coordinates: 55°13′N 56°38′E
- Country: Russia
- Region: Bashkortostan
- District: Nurimanovsky District
- Time zone: UTC+5:00

Novobedeyevo (Russian: Новобедеево; Bashkir: Яңы Бәҙәй, Yañı Bäźäy) is a rural locality (a village) in Krasnogorsky Selsoviet, Nurimanovsky District, Bashkortostan, Russia. The population was 73 as of 2010. The village has three streets.

== Geography ==
Novobedeyevo is located 9 km north of Krasnaya Gorka, the district's administrative centre, by road. Novobiryuchevo is the nearest rural locality.
