= Churashevo, Nurimanovsky District, Republic of Bashkortostan =

Churashevo Чурашево
- Village
- Location within Bashkortostan Location within Russia
- Coordinates: 55°01′N 56°27′E
- Country: Russia
- Region: Bashkortostan
- District: Nurimanovsky District
- Time zone: UTC+5:00

Churashevo (Russian: Чурашево; Bashkir: Сураш, Suraş) is a rural locality (a village) in Baygildinsky Selsoviet, Nurimanovsky District, Bashkortostan, Russia. The population was 168 as of 2010. There are 3 streets.

== Geography ==
Churashevo is located 27 km southwest of Krasnaya Gorka (the district's administrative centre) by road. Ukarlino is the nearest rural locality.
