= Baygildino =

Baygildino Байгильдино
- Selo
- Location within Bashkortostan Location within Russia
- Coordinates: 54°58′N 56°30′E
- Country: Russia
- Region: Bashkortostan
- District: Nurimanovsky District
- Time zone: UTC+5:00

Baygildino (Russian: Байгильдино; Bashkir: Байгилде, Baygilde) is a rural locality (a selo) and the administrative centre of Baygildinsky Selsoviet, Nurimanovsky District, Bashkortostan, Russia. The population was 432 as of 2010. There are 12 streets.

== Geography ==
Baygildino is located 30 km southwest of Krasnaya Gorka (the district's administrative centre) by road. Malotenkashevo is the nearest rural locality.
