= Istrikovo =

Istrikovo Истриково
- Village
- Location within Bashkortostan Location within Russia
- Coordinates: 55°03′N 56°29′E
- Country: Russia
- Region: Bashkortostan
- District: Nurimanovsky District
- Time zone: UTC+5:00

Istrikovo (Russian: Истриково; Bashkir: Иҫтерек, İśterek) is a rural locality (a village) in Baygildinsky Selsoviet, Nurimanovsky District, Bashkortostan, Russia. The population was 222 as of 2010. There are 5 streets.

== Geography ==
Istrikovo is located 24 km southwest of Krasnaya Gorka (the district's administrative centre) by road. Ukarlino is the nearest rural locality.
