= Staroisayevo =

Staroisayevo Староисаево
- Village
- Location within Bashkortostan Location within Russia
- Coordinates: 55°06′N 56°40′E
- Country: Russia
- Region: Bashkortostan
- District: Nurimanovsky District
- Time zone: UTC+5:00

Staroisayevo (Russian: Староисаево; Bashkir: Иҫке Исай, İśke İsay) is a rural locality (a village) in Staroisayevsky Selsoviet, Nurimanovsky District, Bashkortostan, Russia. The population was 537 as of 2010. There are 5 streets.

== Geography ==
Staroisayevo is located 12 km south of Krasnaya Gorka (the district's administrative centre) by road. Starokulevo is the nearest rural locality.
