= Nimislyarovo =

Nimislyarovo Нимислярово
- Selo
- Location within Bashkortostan Location within Russia
- Coordinates: 55°03′N 56°34′E
- Country: Russia
- Region: Bashkortostan
- District: Nurimanovsky District
- Time zone: UTC+5:00

Nimislyarovo (Russian: Нимислярово; Bashkir: Нимесләр, Nimeslär) is a rural locality (a selo) in Novokulevsky Selsoviet, Nurimanovsky District, Bashkortostan, Russia. The population was 691 as of 2010. There are 11 streets.

== Geography ==
Nimislyarovo is located 18 km southwest of Krasnaya Gorka (the district's administrative centre) by road. Novokulevo is the nearest rural locality.
