= Malyye Shidy =

Malyye Shidy Малые Шиды
- Village
- Location within Bashkortostan Location within Russia
- Coordinates: 55°09′N 56°42′E
- Country: Russia
- Region: Bashkortostan
- District: Nurimanovsky District
- Time zone: UTC+5:00

Malyye Shidy (Russian: Малые Шиды; Bashkir: Бәләкәй Шиҙе, Bäläkäy Şiźe) is a rural locality (a village) in Bashshidinsky Selsoviet, Nurimanovsky District, Bashkortostan, Russia. The population was 202 as of 2010. There are 2 streets.

== Geography ==
Malyye Shidy is located 6 km southeast of Krasnaya Gorka (the district's administrative centre) by road. Bash-Shidy is the nearest rural locality.
