= Starobedeyevo =

Starobedeyevo Старобедеево
- Village
- Location within Bashkortostan Location within Russia
- Coordinates: 55°11′N 56°35′E
- Country: Russia
- Region: Bashkortostan
- District: Nurimanovsky District
- Time zone: UTC+5:00

Starobedeyevo (Russian: Старобедеево; Bashkir: Иҫке Бәҙәй, İśke Bäźäy) is a rural locality (a village) and the administrative centre of Starobedeyevsky Selsoviet, Nurimanovsky District, Bashkortostan, Russia. The population was 493 as of 2010. There are 5 streets.

== Geography ==
Starobedeyevo is located 86 km west of Krasnaya Gorka (the district's administrative centre) by road. Ustyugovsky is the nearest rural locality.
