= Bash-Shidy =

Bash-Shidy Баш-Шиды
- Selo
- Location within Bashkortostan Location within Russia
- Coordinates: 55°08′N 56°43′E
- Country: Russia
- Region: Bashkortostan
- District: Nurimanovsky District
- Time zone: UTC+5:00

Bash-Shidy (Russian: Баш-Шиды; Bashkir: Баш-Шиҙе, Baş-Şiźe) is a rural locality (a selo) and the administrative centre of Bashshidinsky Selsoviet, Nurimanovsky District, Bashkortostan, Russia. The population was 228 as of 2010. There are 4 streets.

== Geography ==
Bash-Shidy is located 8 km southeast of Krasnaya Gorka (the district's administrative centre) by road. Malye Shidy is the nearest rural locality.
