= Bikmurzino =

Bikmurzino Бикмурзино
- Village
- Location within Bashkortostan Location within Russia
- Coordinates: 54°59′N 56°26′E
- Country: Russia
- Region: Bashkortostan
- District: Nurimanovsky District
- Time zone: UTC+5:00

Bikmurzino (Russian: Бикмурзино; Bashkir: Бикмырҙа, Bikmırźa) is a rural locality (a village) in Baygildinsky Selsoviet, Nurimanovsky District, Bashkortostan, Russia. The population was 150 as of 2010. There are 6 streets.

== Geography ==
Bikmurzino is located 33 km southwest of Krasnaya Gorka (the district's administrative centre) by road. Kargino is the nearest rural locality.
