= Novy Subay =

Novy Subay Новый Субай
- Selo
- Location within Bashkortostan Location within Russia
- Coordinates: 55°08′N 57°00′E
- Country: Russia
- Region: Bashkortostan
- District: Nurimanovsky District
- Time zone: UTC+5:00

Novy Subay (Russian: Новый Субай; Bashkir: Яңы Субай, Yañı Subay) is a rural locality (a selo) and the administrative centre of Novosubayevsky Selsoviet, Nurimanovsky District, Bashkortostan, Russia. The population was 346 as of 2010. There are 4 streets.

== Geography ==
Novy Subay is located 23 km east of Krasnaya Gorka (the district's administrative centre) by road. Kaznatash is the nearest rural locality.
