= Klyuch Bedeyevo =

Klyuch Bedeyevo Ключ Бедеево
- Village
- Location within Bashkortostan Location within Russia
- Coordinates: 55°15′N 56°40′E
- Country: Russia
- Region: Bashkortostan
- District: Nurimanovsky District
- Time zone: UTC+5:00

Klyuch Bedeyevo (Russian: Ключ Бедеево; Bashkir: Бәҙәйшишмә, Bäźäyşişmä) is a rural locality (a village) in Krasnogorsky Selsoviet, Nurimanovsky District, Bashkortostan, Russia. The population was 100 as of 2010. There are 2 streets.

== Geography ==
Klyuch Bedeyevo is located 9 km north of Krasnaya Gorka (the district's administrative centre) by road. Novobiryuchevo is the nearest rural locality.
