= Ryatush =

Ryatush Рятуш
- Village
- Location within Bashkortostan Location within Russia
- Coordinates: 55°05′N 56°54′E
- Country: Russia
- Region: Bashkortostan
- District: Nurimanovsky District
- Time zone: UTC+5:00

Ryatush (Russian: Рятуш; Bashkir: Рәтүш, Rätüş) is a rural locality (a village) in Novosubayevsky Selsoviet, Nurimanovsky District, Bashkortostan, Russia. The population was 7 as of 2010. There is 1 street.

== Geography ==
Ryatush is located 28 km southeast of Krasnaya Gorka (the district's administrative centre) by road. Novoisayevo is the nearest rural locality.
