= Novobiryuchevo =

Novobiryuchevo Новобирючево
- Village
- Location within Bashkortostan Location within Russia
- Coordinates: 55°14′N 56°37′E
- Country: Russia
- Region: Bashkortostan
- District: Nurimanovsky District
- Time zone: UTC+5:00

Novobiryuchevo (Russian: Новобирючево; Bashkir: Яңы Бүрес, Yañı Büres) is a rural locality (a village) in Krasnogorsky Selsoviet, Nurimanovsky District, Bashkortostan, Russia. The population was 242 as of 2010. There are 5 streets.

== Geography ==
Novobiryuchevo is located 9 km north of Krasnaya Gorka (the district's administrative centre) by road. Novobedeyevo is the nearest rural locality.
