= Ustye Yaman-Yelgi =

Ustye Yaman-Yelgi Устье Яман-Елги
- Village
- Location within Bashkortostan Location within Russia
- Coordinates: 55°25′N 56°36′E
- Country: Russia
- Region: Bashkortostan
- District: Nurimanovsky District
- Time zone: UTC+5:00

Ustye Yaman-Yelgi (Russian: Устье Яман-Елги; Bashkir: Яманйылға тамағы, Yamanyılğa tamağı) is a rural locality (a village) in Krasnoklyuchevsky Selsoviet, Nurimanovsky District, Bashkortostan, Russia. The population was 12 as of 2010. There is 1 street.

== Geography ==
Ustye Yaman-Yelgi is located 34 km north of Krasnaya Gorka (the district's administrative centre) by road. Yaman-Port is the nearest rural locality.
