= Starobiryuchevo =

Starobiryuchevo Старобирючево
- Village
- Location within Bashkortostan Location within Russia
- Coordinates: 55°15′N 56°35′E
- Country: Russia
- Region: Bashkortostan
- District: Nurimanovsky District
- Time zone: UTC+5:00

Starobiryuchevo (Russian: Старобирючево; Bashkir: Иҫке Бүрес, İśke Büres) is a rural locality (a village) in Starobedeyevsky Selsoviet, Nurimanovsky District, Bashkortostan, Russia. The population was 193 as of 2010. There are 4 streets.

== Geography ==
Starobiryuchevo is located 82 km northwest of Krasnaya Gorka (the district's administrative centre) by road. Novobiryuchevo is the nearest rural locality.
