= Uyankul =

Uyankul Уянкуль
- Village
- Location within Bashkortostan Location within Russia
- Coordinates: 54°59′N 56°42′E
- Country: Russia
- Region: Bashkortostan
- District: Nurimanovsky District
- Time zone: UTC+5:00

Uyankul (Russian: Уянкуль; Bashkir: Өйәңкеле, Öyäñkele) is a rural locality (a village) in Novokulevsky Selsoviet, Nurimanovsky District, Bashkortostan, Russia. The population was 19 as of 2010. There is 1 street.

== Geography ==
Uyankul is located 27 km south of Krasnaya Gorka (the district's administrative centre) by road. Satlyk is the nearest rural locality.
