= Bolshiye Shidy =

Bolshiye Shidy Большие Шиды
- Village
- Location within Bashkortostan Location within Russia
- Coordinates: 55°09′N 56°45′E
- Country: Russia
- Region: Bashkortostan
- District: Nurimanovsky District
- Time zone: UTC+5:00

Bolshiye Shidy (Russian: Большие Шиды; Bashkir: Оло Шиҙе, Olo Şiźe) is a rural locality (a village) in Bashshidinsky Selsoviet, Nurimanovsky District, Bashkortostan, Russia. The population was 456 as of 2010. There are 11 streets.

== Geography ==
Bolshiye Shidy is located 9 km southeast of Krasnaya Gorka (the district's administrative centre) by road. Bash-Shidy is the nearest rural locality.
