= Nur, Nurimanovsky District, Republic of Bashkortostan =

Nur Нур
- Village
- Location within Bashkortostan Location within Russia
- Coordinates: 55°00′N 56°56′E
- Country: Russia
- Region: Bashkortostan
- District: Nurimanovsky District
- Time zone: UTC+5:00

Nur (Bashkir and Russian: Нур) is a rural locality (a village) in Novosubayevsky Selsoviet, Nurimanovsky District, Bashkortostan, Russia. The population was 96 as of 2010. There is 1 street.

== Geography ==
Nur is located 20 km east of Krasnaya Gorka (the district's administrative centre) by road. Stary Biyaz is the nearest rural locality.
