= Uraklino =

Uraklino Укарлино
- Village
- Location within Bashkortostan Location within Russia
- Coordinates: 55°01′N 56°29′E
- Country: Russia
- Region: Bashkortostan
- District: Nurimanovsky District
- Time zone: UTC+5:00

Uraklino (Russian: Укарлино; Bashkir: Үкәрле, Ükärle) is a rural locality (a village) in Baygildinsky Selsoviet, Nurimanovsky District, Bashkortostan, Russia. The population was 165 as of 2010. There are 4 streets.

== Geography ==
Uraklino is located 25 km southwest of Krasnaya Gorka (the district's administrative centre) by road. Churashevo is the nearest rural locality.
