= Ust-Saldybash =

Ust-Saldybash Усть-Салдыбаш
- Village
- Location within Bashkortostan Location within Russia
- Coordinates: 55°09′N 56°36′E
- Country: Russia
- Region: Bashkortostan
- District: Nurimanovsky District
- Time zone: UTC+5:00

Ust-Saldybash (Russian: Усть-Салдыбаш; Bashkir: Салдыбаштамаҡ, Saldıbaştamaq) is a rural locality (a village) in Krasnogorsky Selsoviet, Nurimanovsky District, Bashkortostan, Russia. The population was 35 as of 2010. There are 2 streets.

== Geography ==
Ust-Saldybash is located 16 km southwest of Krasnaya Gorka (the district's administrative centre) by road. Starobedeyevo is the nearest rural locality.
