= Stary Biyaz =

Stary Biyaz Старый Бияз
- Village
- Location within Bashkortostan Location within Russia
- Coordinates: 55°07′N 56°55′E
- Country: Russia
- Region: Bashkortostan
- District: Nurimanovsky District
- Time zone: UTC+5:00

Stary Biyaz (Russian: Старый Бияз; Bashkir: Иҫке Биәз, İśke Biäz) is a rural locality (a village) in Novosubayevsky Selsoviet, Nurimanovsky District, Bashkortostan, Russia. The population was 82 as of 2010. There is 1 street.

== Geography ==
Stary Biyaz is located 24 km southeast of Krasnaya Gorka (the district's administrative centre) by road. Nur is the nearest rural locality.
