= Kyzyl-Barzhau =

Kyzyl-Barzhau Кызыл-Баржау
- Village
- Location within Bashkortostan Location within Russia
- Coordinates: 55°00′N 56°34′E
- Country: Russia
- Region: Bashkortostan
- District: Nurimanovsky District
- Time zone: UTC+5:00

Kyzyl-Barzhau (Russian: Кызыл-Баржау; Bashkir: Ҡыҙыл Бәрйәү, Qıźıl Bäryäw) is a rural locality (a village) in Novokulevsky Selsoviet, Nurimanovsky District, Bashkortostan, Russia. The population was 55 as of 2010. There is 1 street.

== Geography ==
Kyzyl-Barzhau is located 24 km south of Krasnaya Gorka (the district's administrative centre) by road. Gizyatovo is the nearest rural locality.
