= Nurimanovsky District =

Nurimanovsky District Нуримановский район (Russian)
- District

Other transcription(s)
  - Bashkir: Нуриман районы
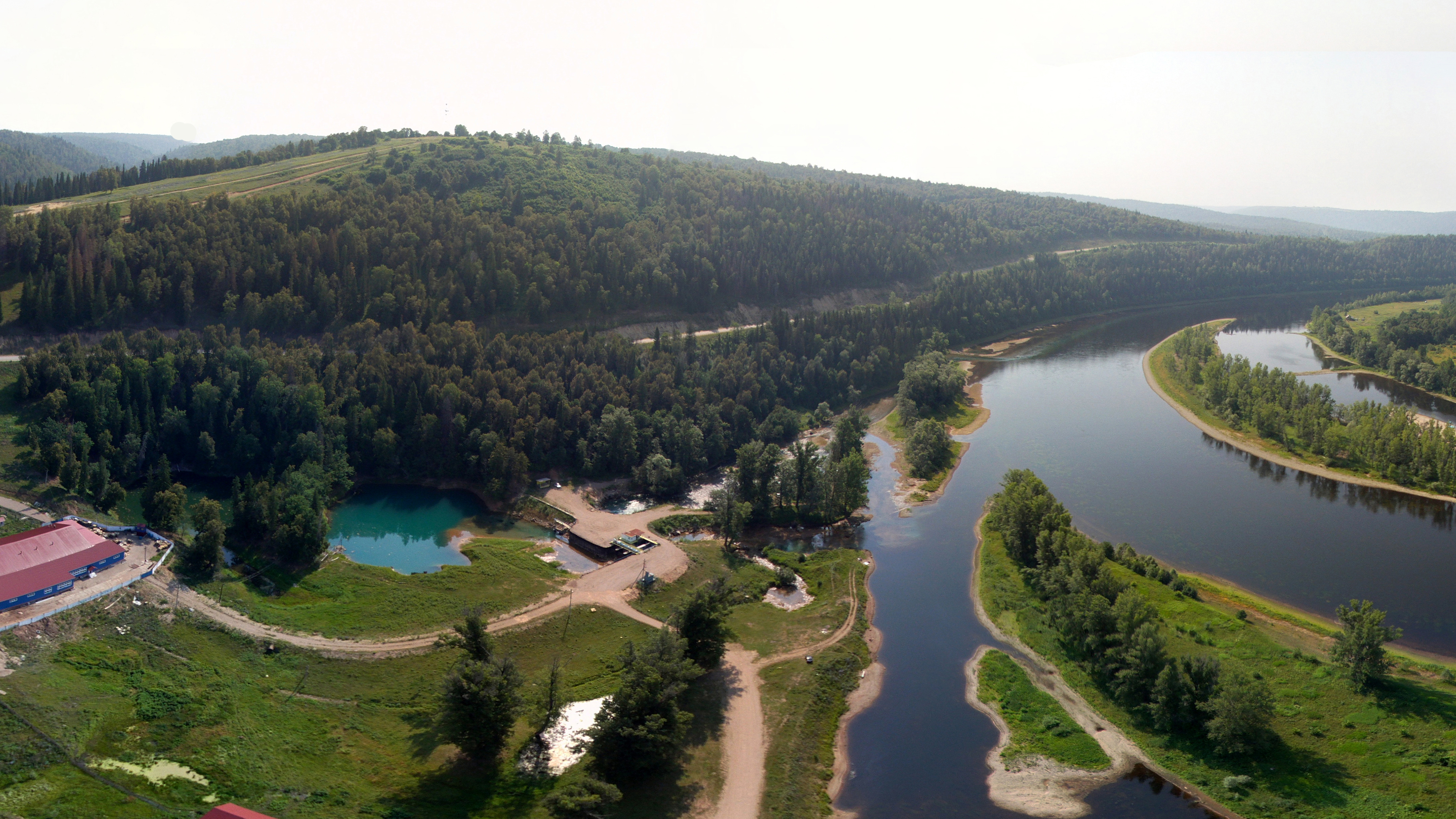
- "Red Key" Spring, Nurimanovsky District

- Flag Coat of arms
- Location of Nurimanovsky District in the Republic of Bashkortostan
- Coordinates: 55°12′N 56°40′E
- Country: Russia
- Federal subject: Republic of Bashkortostan
- Established: 1930
- Administrative center: Krasnaya Gorka

Area
  - Total: 2,634 km^{2} (1,017 sq mi)

Population (2010 Census)
  - Total: 20,824
  - Estimate (2018): 20,120 (−3.4%)
  - Density: 7.906/km^{2} (20.48/sq mi)
  - Urban: 0%
  - Rural: 100%

Administrative structure
  - Administrative divisions: 12 Selsoviets
  - Inhabited localities: 51 rural localities

Municipal structure
  - Municipally incorporated as: Nurimanovsky Municipal District
  - Municipal divisions: 0 urban settlements, 12 rural settlements
- Time zone: UTC+5 (MSK+2)
- OKTMO ID: 80645000
- Website: http://www.mr-nuriman.ru

Population of Nurimanovsky District
- 2010 Census: 20,824
- 2002 Census: 21,932
- 1989 Census: 23,371
- 1979 Census: 28,196

Nurimanovsky District (Russian: Нурима́новский райо́н; Bashkir: Нуриман районы, Nuriman rayonı) is an administrative and municipal district (raion), one of the fifty-four in the Republic of Bashkortostan, Russia. It is located in the northeast of the republic and borders with Karaidelsky District in the north, Chelyabinsk Oblast in the east, Iglinsky District in the south, and with Blagoveshchensky District in the west. The area of the district is 2,634 square kilometers (1,017 sq mi). Its administrative center is the rural locality (a selo) of Krasnaya Gorka. As of the 2010 Census, the total population of the district was 20,824, with the population of Krasnaya Gorka accounting for 20.6% of that number.

== History ==
The district was established in 1930.

== Administrative and municipal status ==
Within the framework of administrative divisions, Nurimanovsky District is one of the fifty-four in the Republic of Bashkortostan. The district is divided into twelve selsoviets, comprising fifty-one rural localities. As a municipal division, the district is incorporated as Nurimanovsky Municipal District. Its twelve selsoviets are incorporated as twelve rural settlements within the municipal district. The selo of Krasnaya Gorka serves as the administrative center of both the administrative and municipal district.
