= Krasnaya Gorka, Nurimanovsky District, Republic of Bashkortostan =

Krasnaya Gorka Красная Горка
- Selo

Other transcription(s)
  - Bashkir: Ҡыҙылъяр
- Interactive map of Krasnaya Gorka
- Location of Krasnaya Gorka Krasnaya Gorka (Bashkortostan)
- Coordinates: 55°11′50″N 56°40′10″E
- Country: Russia
- Federal subject: Bashkortostan
- Administrative district: Nurimanovsky District
- Elevation: 130 m (430 ft)

Population (2010 Census)
  - Total: 4,280
- Time zone: UTC+5 (MSK+2)
- Postal code: 452440
- OKTMO ID: 80645415101

Krasnaya Gorka (Russian: Кра́сная Го́рка, Bashkir: Ҡыҙылъяр, Qıźılyar) is a rural locality (a selo) and the administrative center of Nurimanovsky District of the Republic of Bashkortostan, Russia, located on the Ufa River. Population: 4,280 (2010 census); 4,071 (2002 census); 3,805 (1989 Soviet census).
