= Tirlyan (river) =

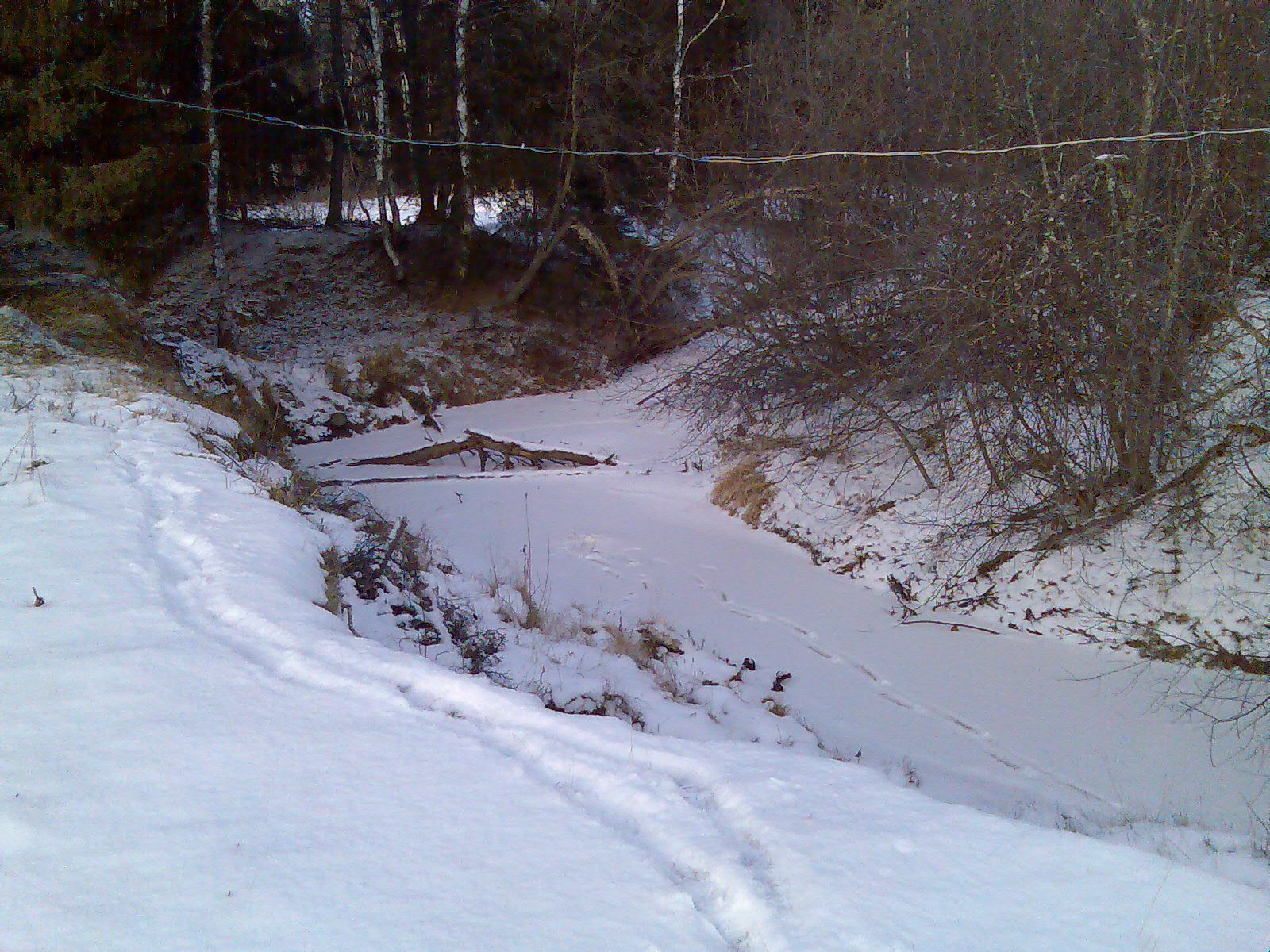
- Native name: Тирлян (Bashkir)

Location
- Country: Russia

Physical characteristics
- Mouth: Belaya
  - coordinates: 54°12′04″N 58°35′50″E
- Length: 46 km (29 mi)
- Basin size: 529 km^{2} (204 sq mi)

Basin features
- Progression: Belaya→ Kama→ Volga→ Caspian Sea

The Tirlyan (Bashkir: Тирлән, Tirlän) is a river in Russia, and a tributary of the Belaya; the Tirlyan flows in Beloretsk district of Bashkortostan. The mouth of the river is located in 1,363 km along the right bank of the Belaya. The length of the river is 46 km, the catchment area is 529 km².

== Geography and hydrology ==
In the estuary area on the river there is a single settlement, the village of Tirlyansky. At 3 km from the estuary, in the area of the reservoir, the left bank tributary of Arsh flows into the river. In 20 km from the estuary, along the left bank another large tributary of Misel flows into. Other tributaries are the Stone Key, the Big Key, the Black Klyuch, the Bezymyanka.

The river takes its source in the Zhuravlin Marsh located under the Yalangas ridge (1297.9 m), between the Ustinskaya mountains (Устинская) (865.9 m) and the Tikhaya (Тихая) (774.4 m).

According to the state water register of Russia the river belongs to the Kamsky basin district, the water sector of the river is attached to the Belaya district from the source to the Arsky Rock gauging station, and the river sub-basin of the Belaya.

== Tyrlyansk Reservoir ==
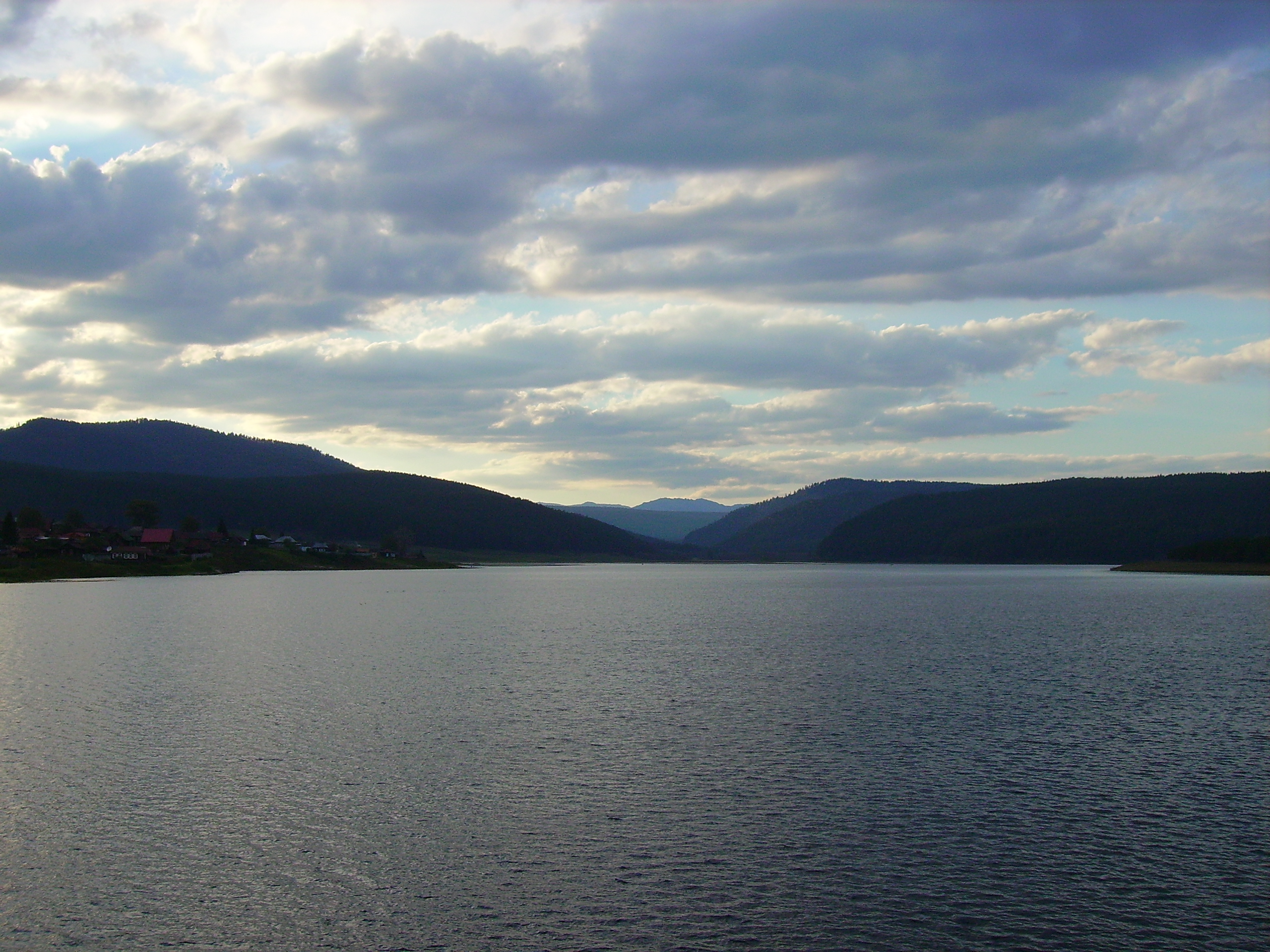
Tyrlyansk Reservoir

On the river there is the Tyrlyansk Reservoir, best known for its flooding on August 7, 1994, which led to devastating consequences.

The Tyrlyansk Reservoir is located at 54°13′40″N 58°35′00″E and was formed on the Tirlyan River as a result of the construction of a dam for the needs of recreation, fish farming, flood mitigation, and power generation. The area of the lake is 129.3 ha. The height above sea level is 195 m.

Despite the modest catchment areas of the river, this reservoir is known for its disastrous breakthrough on August 7, 1994. This abnormal discharge of 8,600,000 m³ of water is still considered one of the most damaging consequences of the Russian Federation. In a heavy rain, which lasted from 5 to 8 August, the dam was flooded and washed away. As a result of this accident, 4 settlements (Tirlyansky, Shushpa, Katayka and Beloretsk) were flooded, 85 houses were completely destroyed, 200 houses damaged, 29 people were killed, 786 people were left homeless. The break occurred because locks did not work and therefore could not be opened.
