= Tirlyan =

Village in Beloretsky District, Russia

Coordinates: 54°14′N 58°40′E

Tirlyansky (Russian: Тирлянский; Bashkir: Тирлән, Tirlän), also known as Tirlyan, Tirlian and Bashkir Tirlan, is a village in the Beloretsky District of Bashkortostan, the center and the only settlement of the Tirlyansk soviet. It is located at the confluence of the Tirlian River and the Belaya River 33 km from Beloretsk. The nearest railway station is 41km away.

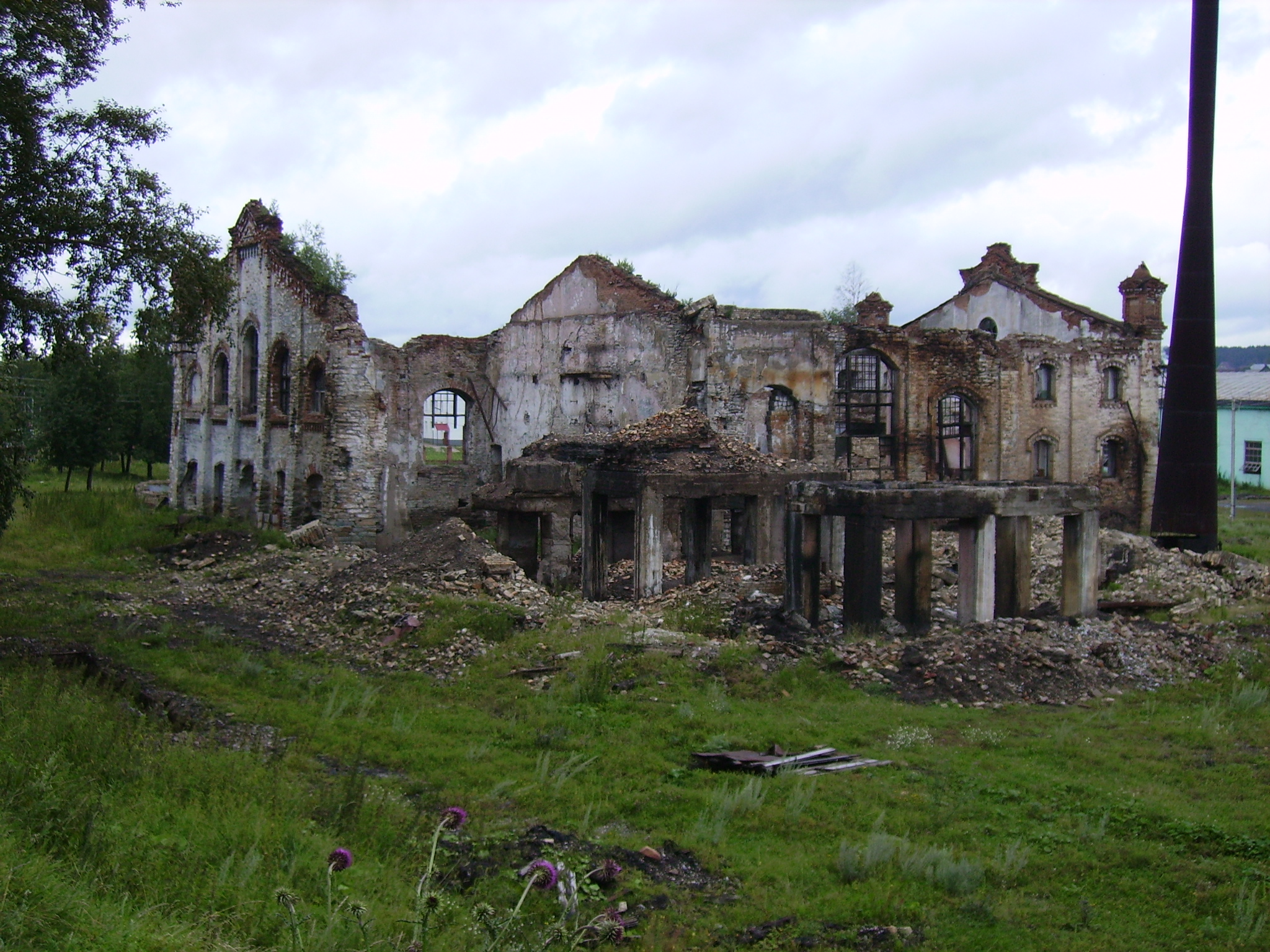
Ruins left from the Tirlyansk iron plant, washed away by the flood in 1994.

Plans began in 1759 for an iron works in the village but it was not till 1803 that the plant began operations. A full road was only constructed to the town in 1913, built by Chinese workers. The railway was built soon after.

After the construction of an asphalt road in 2001 between Tirlyan and Beloretsk, the movement of passenger trains Beloretsk-Tirlian-Beloretsk was closed since 20 May 2002. By autumn 2003, a section of a narrow-gauge railway between Tirlyan and Verkhnearshinsky was dismantled. As of the end of 2003, the narrow-gauge line from Beloretsk to Tirlyan remained alive. On it was an irregular movement - mainly the export of rolling stock from Tirlyan to scrap metal. Periodically, from Beloretsk to Tirlian, fuel oil for the boiler room was also delivered. These last 34 kilometers were once the most important section of the Beloretsk railway, where hundreds of passengers drove daily. The last section of the Beloretsk narrow-gauge railway (from Beloretsk to Katayki) was dismantled in the spring and summer of 2007.

In 1994 the village was affected by terrible floods.

== Landmarks ==
The ruins of the Tirlyansky iron plant is one of the major landmarks in the village. It was closed after the 1994 flood.

Near the ruins of the plant is a huge iron wheel with spokes. This is one of two drivers for the rolling mills. There is still a hollow in the rocks, where the Beloretskaya narrow-gauge railway line (BUW) ran, through which there is a view of the reservoir.

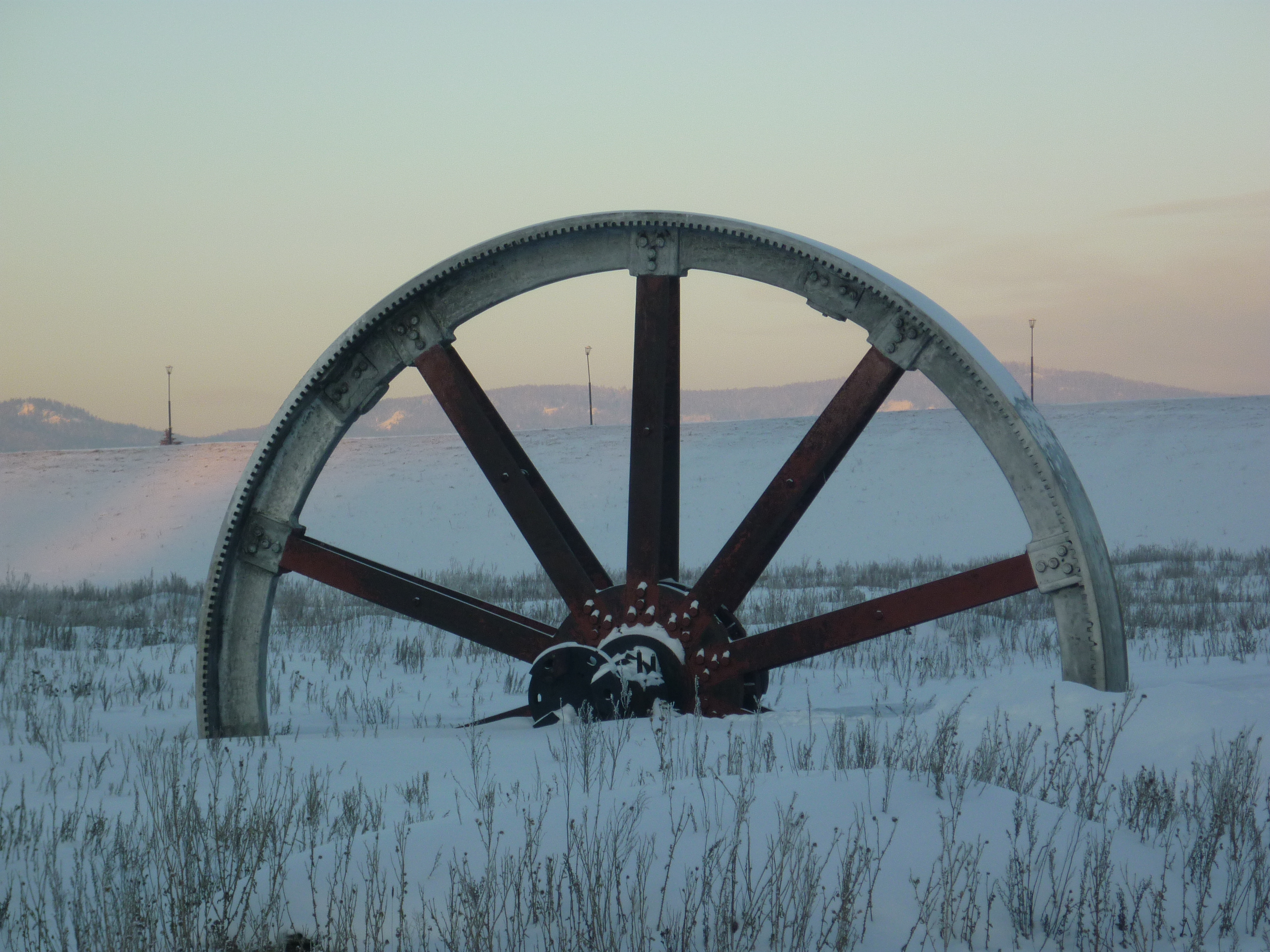
Old Driving wheel for the iron plant

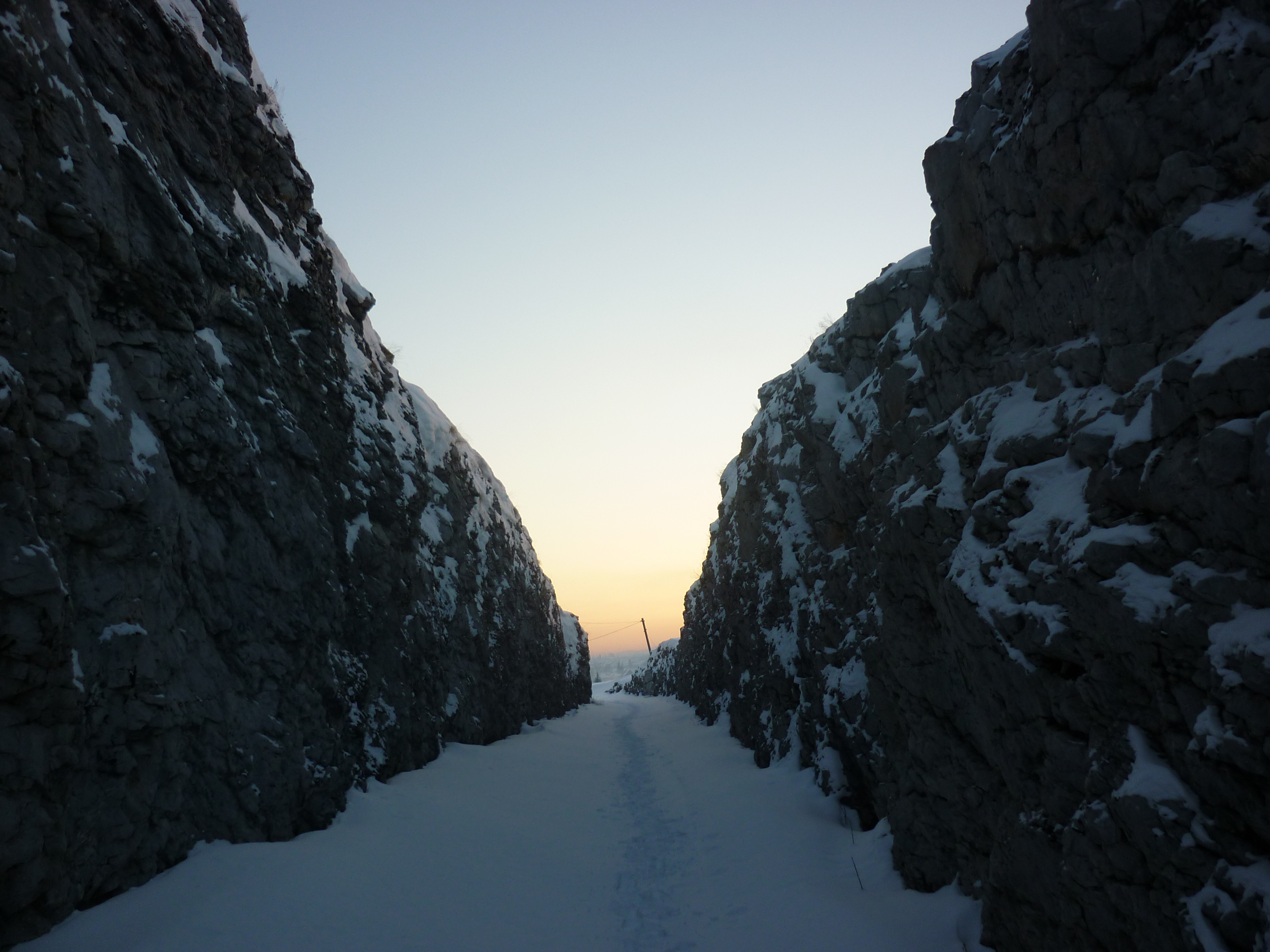
Railway cutting.

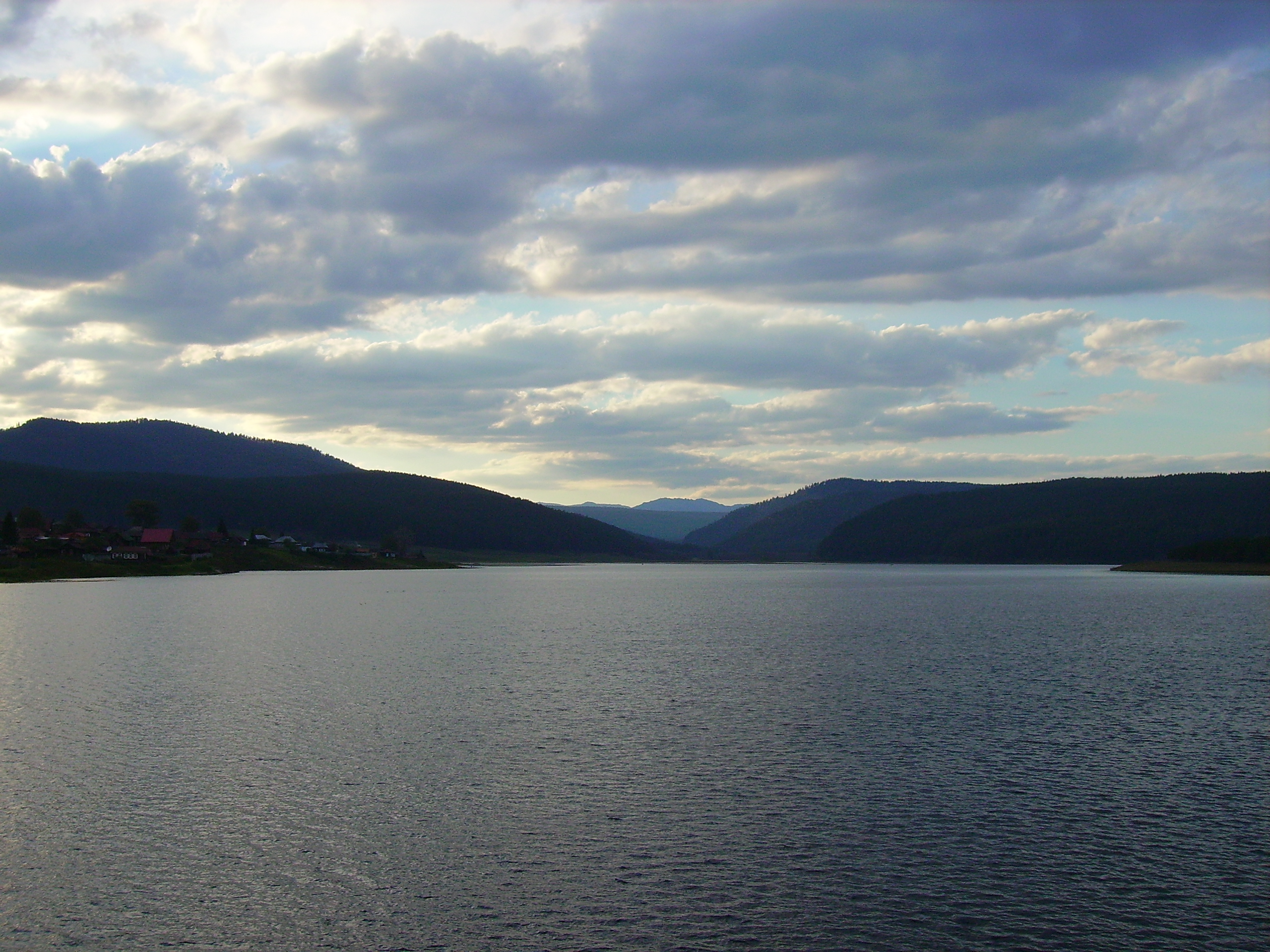
View of the reservoir

== Population ==
Year	Population	Source(s)
1866	3555	
1959	14034	
1979	9849	
1989	8066	
1970	12017	
2002	5747	
2009	5257	
2010	4427	
2012	4357	
2013	4296	
2014	4218	
2015	4142	
