= Katayka =

Katayka Катайка
- Village
- Location within Bashkortostan Location within Russia
- Coordinates: 54°02′N 58°25′E
- Country: Russia
- Region: Bashkortostan
- District: Beloretsky District
- Time zone: UTC+5:00

Katayka (Russian: Катайка; Bashkir: Ҡатай, Qatay) is a rural locality (a village) in Nursky Selsoviet, Beloretsky District, Bashkortostan, Russia. The population was 23 as of 2010. There are 12 streets.

== Geography ==
Katayka is located 12 km north of Beloretsk (the district's administrative centre) by road. Shushpa is the nearest rural locality.
