= Verkhnearshinsky =

Verkhnearshinsky Верхнеаршинский
- Selo
- Location within Bashkortostan Location within Russia
- Coordinates: 54°21′N 58°31′E
- Country: Russia
- Region: Bashkortostan
- District: Beloretsky District
- Time zone: UTC+5:00

Verkhnearshinsky (Russian: Верхнеаршинский; Bashkir: Үрге Арша, Ürge Arşa) is a rural locality (a selo) in Nikolayevsky Selsoviet, Beloretsky District, Bashkortostan, Russia. The population was 119 as of 2010. There are 17 streets.

== Geography ==
Verkhnearshinsky is located 74 km north of Beloretsk (the district's administrative centre) by road. Nikolayevka is the nearest rural locality.
