= Shushpa =

Shushpa Шушпа
- Village
- Location within Bashkortostan Location within Russia
- Coordinates: 54°04′N 58°28′E
- Country: Russia
- Region: Bashkortostan
- District: Beloretsky District
- Time zone: UTC+5:00

Shushpa (Russian: Шушпа; Bashkir: Шушпа, Şuşpa) is a rural locality (a village) in Nursky Selsoviet, Beloretsky District, Bashkortostan, Russia. The population was 43 as of 2010. There are 9 streets.

== Geography ==
Shushpa is located 16 km north of Beloretsk (the district's administrative centre) by road. Katayka is the nearest rural locality.
