= Nizhnesyuryubayevo =

Nizhnesyuryubayevo Нижнесюрюбаево
- Village
- Location within Bashkortostan Location within Russia
- Coordinates: 52°24′N 56°28′E
- Country: Russia
- Region: Bashkortostan
- District: Kugarchinsky District
- Time zone: UTC+5:00

Nizhnesyuryubayevo (Russian: Нижнесюрюбаево; Bashkir: Түбәнге Сирбай, Tübänge Sirbay) is a rural locality (a village) in Maxyutovsky Selsoviet, Kugarchinsky District, Bashkortostan, Russia. The population was 1 as of 2010. There is one street.

== Geography ==
Nizhnesyuryubayevo is located 43 kilometres (27 mi) south of Mrakovo (the district's administrative centre) by road. Verkhnemursalyayevo is the nearest rural locality.
