= Verkhnemursalyayevo =

Verkhnemursalyayevo Верхнемурсаляево
- Village
- Location within Bashkortostan Location within Russia
- Coordinates: 52°25′N 56°29′E
- Country: Russia
- Region: Bashkortostan
- District: Kugarchinsky District
- Time zone: UTC+5:00

Verkhnemursalyayevo (Russian: Верхнемурсаляево; Bashkir: Үрге Мөрсәләй, Ürge Mörsäläy) is a rural locality (a village) in Kugarchinsky Selsoviet, Kugarchinsky District, Bashkortostan, Russia. The population was 126 as of 2010. There is 1 street.

== Geography ==
Verkhnemursalyayevo is located 41 km south of Mrakovo (the district's administrative centre) by road. Verkhnesyuryubayevo is the nearest rural locality.
