= List of Heroes of the Russian Federation =

This is a list of people who have been awarded the title Hero of the Russian Federation.

The title was established in 1992, and was awarded more than 970 times since then, including more than 440 times posthumously.

Due to the list's size, it is divided into subsections.

== Alphabetical ==
- List of Heroes of the Russian Federation (A)
- List of Heroes of the Russian Federation (B)
- List of Heroes of the Russian Federation (C)
- List of Heroes of the Russian Federation (D)
- List of Heroes of the Russian Federation (E)
- List of Heroes of the Russian Federation (F)
- List of Heroes of the Russian Federation (G)
- List of Heroes of the Russian Federation (I)
- List of Heroes of the Russian Federation (K)
- List of Heroes of the Russian Federation (L)
- List of Heroes of the Russian Federation (M)
- List of Heroes of the Russian Federation (N)
- List of Heroes of the Russian Federation (O)
- List of Heroes of the Russian Federation (P)
- List of Heroes of the Russian Federation (R)
- List of Heroes of the Russian Federation (S)
- List of Heroes of the Russian Federation (T)
- List of Heroes of the Russian Federation (U)
- List of Heroes of the Russian Federation (V)
- List of Heroes of the Russian Federation (Y)
- List of Heroes of the Russian Federation (Z)
- List of female Heroes of the Russian Federation
