= List of Heroes of the Russian Federation (T) =

This is a list of people who have been awarded the title Hero of the Russian Federation.

It has been awarded more than 970 times, of which more than 440 were posthumously.

== List of Heroes of the Russian Federation ==
- Vitaly Talabaev (ru)
- Andrey Talalakin (ru)
- Vladimir Tamgin (ru)
- Sergey Taranets (ru)
- Vasily Tarasov (ru)
- Yevgeny Tarelkin
- Igor Tarelkin (ru)
- Azamet Tasimov (ru)
- Roman Taskaev (ru)
- Vladimir Tatashvili (ru)
- Magomed Tashukhadzhiev (ru)
- Suren Tashchiev (ru)
- Andrey Teperik (ru)
- Mikhail Teplinsky
- Beslan Tepsaev (ru)
- Vladimir Terekhov (ru)
- Oleg Tereshkin (ru)
- Oleg Tibekin (ru)
- Konstantin Timerman (ru)
- Andrey Timoshenko (ru)
- Valery Tinkov (ru)
- Anatoly Titov (ru)
- Aleksandr Tikhonov (ru)
- Igor Tkachenko
- Valery Tokarev
- Vyacheslav Tokarev (ru)
- Magomed Tolboev
- Taygib Tolboev
- Dmitry Tormakhov (ru)
- Yuri Tregubenkov (ru)
- Sergey Treshchov
- Viktor Trofimenko (ru)
- Andrei Troshev
- Gennady Troshev
- Vladimir Trubanov (ru)
- Vyacheslav Trubnikov
- Yevgeny Trundaev (ru)
- Gennady Tsatsorin (ru)
- Sergey Tsvetov (ru)
- Vladimir Tsvetov (ru)
- Yuri Tsvetov (ru)
- Ivan Tsevun (ru)
- Eduard Tseyev (ru)
- Vasily Tsibliyev
- Oleg Tsokov
- Oleg Tsoy (ru)
- Aldar Tsydenzhapov
- Baldan Tsydypov (ru)
- Vitaly Tsymanovsky (ru)
- Sergey Tulin (ru)
- Leonty Tupitsyn (ru)
- Andrey Turkin (ru)
- Aleksey Tuchin (ru)
- Andrey Tyunin (ru)
- Viktor Tyurikov (ru)
- Mikhail Tyurin
- Aleksey Tyagachyov (ru)

== See also ==
- Awards and decorations of the Russian Federation
- Awards and Emblems of the Ministry of Defense of the Russian Federation
- Awards of the Ministry of Internal Affairs of Russia
- Awards of the Federal Security Service of the Russian Federation
- Awards of the Federal Protective Service of the Russian Federation
- Awards of the Ministry for Emergency Situations of Russia
- Honorary titles of Russia
