= List of Heroes of the Russian Federation (C) =

This is a list of people who have been awarded the title Hero of the Russian Federation.

It has been awarded more than 970 times, of which more than 440 were posthumously.

== List of Heroes of the Russian Federation ==
- Vladimir Chabanov (ru)
- Aleksey Chagin (ru)
- Zamid Chalaev
- Aleksandr Chaiko
- Aleksandr Chekalin
- Sergey Chemezov
- Anatoly Chepiga
- Vladimir Cheprakov (ru)
- Aleksandr Cherepanov (ru)
- Aleksandr Chernov (ru)
- Vyacheslav Chernukha (ru)
- Aleksandr Chernyshyov (ru)
- Yevgeny Chernyshyov (ru)
- Sergey Chernyavsky (ru)
- Yevgeny Chernayev (ru)
- Yan Chernyak
- Viktor Chechy (ru)
- Igor Chilikanov (ru)
- Artur Chilingarov
- Albert Chirikov (ru)
- Viktor Chirkin (ru)
- Kharun Chochuev (ru)
- Vasily Chubenko (ru)
- Yuri Chumak (ru)
- Mikhail Churkin (ru)
- Valery Chukhvantsev (ru)
- Lona Cohen
- Morris Cohen

== See also ==
- Awards and decorations of the Russian Federation
- Awards and Emblems of the Ministry of Defense of the Russian Federation
- Awards of the Ministry of Internal Affairs of Russia
- Awards of the Federal Security Service of the Russian Federation
- Awards of the Federal Protective Service of the Russian Federation
- Awards of the Ministry for Emergency Situations of Russia
- Honorary titles of Russia
