= List of Heroes of the Russian Federation (F) =

This is a list of people who have been awarded the title Hero of the Russian Federation.

It has been awarded more than 970 times, of which more than 440 were posthumously.

== List of Heroes of the Russian Federation ==
- Aleksey Fabry (ru)
- Valery Fadeev (ru)
- Aleksandr Fadin (ru)
- Anton Farelyuk (ru)
- Dmitry Farshinyov (ru)
- Roman Fyodorov
- Viktor Fedosov (ru)
- Yevgeny Fedotov (ru)
- Ivan Fedyayev
- Aleksandr Feklisov
- Nikolai Filin (ru)
- Roman Filipov
- Igor Filkin (ru)
- Sergey Firsov (ru)
- Ivan Flyorov
- Gennady Fomenko (ru)
- Aleksandr Fomin (ru)
- Aleksey Fomin (ru)
- Andrey Frolenkov (ru)
- Vladimir Frolov
- Yevgeny Frolov (ru)

== See also ==
- Awards and decorations of the Russian Federation
- Awards and Emblems of the Ministry of Defense of the Russian Federation
- Awards of the Ministry of Internal Affairs of Russia
- Awards of the Federal Security Service of the Russian Federation
- Awards of the Federal Protective Service of the Russian Federation
- Awards of the Ministry for Emergency Situations of Russia
- Honorary titles of Russia
