= List of Heroes of the Russian Federation (O) =

This is a list of people who have been awarded the title Hero of the Russian Federation.

It has been awarded more than 970 times, of which more than 440 were posthumously.

== List of Heroes of the Russian Federation ==
- Aleksey Ovchinin
- Sergey Ozhegov (ru)
- Murad Ozdoev
- Valery Olovarenko (ru)
- Magomed Omarov
- Viktor Omelkov (ru)
- Aleksandr Omelyanenko (ru)
- Yuri Onufriyenko
- Aleksandr Oparin (ru)
- Denis Oparin (ru)
- Andrey Orlov (ru)
- Sergey Orlov (lieutenant) (ru)
- Sergey Orlov (captain) (ru)
- Sulom-Bek Oskanov
- Magomed Osmanov (ru)
- Yevgeny Osokin (ru)
- Pavel Ostanin (ru)
- Eduard Ostrovsky (ru)
- Yevgeny Ostroukhov (ru)
- Nikolai Osykovy (ru)
- Viktor Oskin (ru)
- Aleksandr Otrakovsky (ru)
- Aleksey Otcheskikh (ru)
- Oleg Okhrimenko (ru)
- Valery Ocheretny (ru)

== See also ==
- Awards and decorations of the Russian Federation
- Awards and Emblems of the Ministry of Defense of the Russian Federation
- Awards of the Ministry of Internal Affairs of Russia
- Awards of the Federal Security Service of the Russian Federation
- Awards of the Federal Protective Service of the Russian Federation
- Awards of the Ministry for Emergency Situations of Russia
- Honorary titles of Russia
