= List of Heroes of the Russian Federation (D) =

This is a list of people who have been awarded the title Hero of the Russian Federation.

It has been awarded more than 970 times, of which more than 440 were posthumously.

== List of Heroes of the Russian Federation ==
- Mikhail Dangiriev (ru)
- Yuri Danilin (ru)
- Aleksandr Darkovich (ru)
- Ilyas Daudi
- Zakir Daudov (ru)
- Magomed Daudov
- Sultan Dautmerzaev (ru)
- Aleksandr Dvornikov
- Vladimir Dezhurov
- Pyotr Deynekin
- Yuri Deyneko (ru)
- Alibek Delimkhanov
- Aleksey Dergunov (ru)
- Nikolai Dzhardzhadze (ru)
- Zaur Dzhibilov (ru)
- Aleksandr Dzyuba (ru)
- Nikolai Dioritsa (ru)
- Yuri Dmitriev (ru)
- Aleksey Dmitrov (ru)
- Andrey Dneprovsky (ru)
- Oleg Dolgov (ru)
- Vladislav Dolonin (ru)
- Denis Dolonsky (ru)
- Anatoly Dorofeev (ru)
- Dmitry Dorofeev (ru)
- Fyodor Dorofeev (ru)
- Aleksandr Dostavalov (ru)
- Vladimir Dronov (ru)
- Viktor Dubovoy (ru)
- Viktor Dubynin
- Viktor Dudkin (ru)
- Oleg Dukanov (ru)
- Aleksandr Dumchikov (ru)
- Vladislav Dukhin (ru)
- Andrey Dyachenko (ru)
- Yuri Dyudya (ru)
- Aleksey Dyumin

== See also ==
- Awards and decorations of the Russian Federation
- Awards and Emblems of the Ministry of Defense of the Russian Federation
- Awards of the Ministry of Internal Affairs of Russia
- Awards of the Federal Security Service of the Russian Federation
- Awards of the Federal Protective Service of the Russian Federation
- Awards of the Ministry for Emergency Situations of Russia
- Honorary titles of Russia
