= List of Heroes of the Russian Federation (K) =

This is a list of people who have been awarded the title Hero of the Russian Federation.

It has been awarded more than 970 times, of which more than 440 were posthumously.

== List of Heroes of the Russian Federation ==
- Vladimir Kaganov (ru)
- Rafik Kadyrbulatov (ru)
- Akhmad Kadyrov
- Ramzan Kadyrov
- Murtazali Kazanalipov (ru)
- Viktor Kazantsev
- Pyotr Kazmin (ru)
- Zulkaid Kaidov (ru)
- Said-Magomed Kakiev
- Viktor Kalashnikov (ru)
- Mikhail Kalashnikov
- Aleksandr Kaleri
- Alikhan Kalimatov (ru)
- Aleksandr Kalinin (ru)
- Andrey Kalyapin (ru)
- Ivan Kamenskikh (ru)
- Valery Kanakin (ru)
- Yevgeny Kapustin (ru)
- Yunus Karaketov (ru)
- Boris Karasyov (ru)
- Okhid Kardanov (ru)
- Aleksandr Karelin
- Andrey Karlov
- Vladimir Karpushenko (ru)
- Oleg Kaskov (ru)
- Dmitry Kasperovich (ru)
- Ilya Kasyanov (ru)
- Artyom Katunkin (ru)
- Sergey Kachovsky (ru)
- Natalya Kachuevskaya
- Olga Kachura
- Leonid Kvasnikov
- Nikolai Kvasha (ru)
- Anatoly Kvashnin
- Anatoly Kvochur
- Sergey Kirienko
- Aleksey Kirillin (ru)
- Grigory Kirichenko (ru)
- Aleksandr Kiryanov (ru)
- Yevgeny Kiryushin (ru)
- Sergey Kislov (ru)
- Konstantin Kisten (ru)
- Roman Kitanin (ru)
- Gennady Kichkaylo (ru)
- Aleksandr Kishinsky (ru)
- Aleksandr Klimov (ru)
- Dmitry Klimov (ru)
- Yuri Klimov (ru)
- Yevgeny Klochkov (ru)
- Rustem Klupov (ru)
- Viktor Klykov (ru)
- Oleg Klyuchnikov (ru)
- Anatoly Knyshov (ru)
- Aleksandr Kobin (ru)
- Sergey Kobylash (ru)
- Aleksandr Kovalyov (ru)
- George Koval
- Vladimir Kovtun (ru)
- Dmitry Kozhemyakin (ru)
- Igor Kozhin (ru)
- Konstantin Kozeev
- Aleksey Kozin (ru)
- Aleksey Kozlov
- Ilya Kozlov (ru)
- Oleg Kozlov (general)
- Oleg Kozlov (sniper) (ru)
- Shamil Kokinaev (ru)
- Ruslan Kokshin
- Aleksandr Kolgatin (ru)
- Yevgeny Kolesnikov (ru)
- Yuri Kolesnikov (ru)
- Ivan Kolos (ru)
- Nikolai Kolpakov (ru)
- Vladimir Kolybabinsky (ru)
- Aleksandr Komarov (ru)
- Aleksandr Komyagin (ru)
- Yelena Kondakova
- Dmitry Kondratyev
- Aleksandr Konovalov (ru)
- Yuri Konovalov (ru)
- Oleg Kononenko (cosmonaut)
- Oleg Kononenko (pilot) (ru)
- Aleksandr Kononov (ru)
- Yevgeny Konopelkin (ru)
- Leonid Konstantinov (ru)
- Ivan Konyukhov (ru)
- Anatoly Kopyrkin (ru)
- Nikolai Kopytov (ru)
- Valentin Korabelnikov
- Aleksey Korablyov (ru)
- Vladimir Korgutov (ru)
- Valery Korzun
- Igor Kornienko (ru)
- Mikhail Kornienko
- Anatoly Korobenkov (ru)
- Igor Korobov
- Roman Korovushkin (ru)
- Arkady Korolkov (ru)
- Sergey Korolkov (ru)
- Viktor Korostiev (ru)
- Anatoly Korochensky (ru)
- Ivan Korchagin (ru)
- Sergey Korshunov (ru)
- Sergey Kosachyov (ru)
- Nikolai Kostechko (ru)
- Viktor Kostin (ru)
- Sergey Kostin (ru)
- Abubakar Kostoev (major) (ru)
- Abubakar Kostoev (colonel) (ru)
- Shirvani Kostoev
- Valentin Kostyukov (ru)
- Igor Kostyukov
- Akhmed Kotiev (ru)
- Oleg Kotov
- Yevgeny Kocheshkov (ru)
- Stanislav Kravtsov (ru)
- Valentina Kravchenko
- Aleksandr Krasikov (ru)
- Aleksandr Krasnikov (ru)
- Konstantin Krasnikov (ru)
- Andrey Krasov
- Andrey Krestyaninov (ru)
- Pavel Kretov (ru)
- Sergey Krikalyov
- Vyacheslav Kritsky (ru)
- Ivan Kropochev (ru)
- Vyacheslav Krotevich (ru)
- Aleksandr Kruzhalin (ru)
- Anatoly Krupinov (ru)
- Aleksandr Krutov (ru)
- Oleg Kryukov (ru)
- Oleg Kublin (ru)
- Artyom Kuzin (ru)
- Aleksandr Kuznetsov (sergeant) (ru)
- Aleksandr Kuznetsov (major) (ru)
- Sergey Kuzmin (ru)
- Fyodor Kuzmin (ru)
- Mikhail Kuzmichyov (ru)
- Nikolai Kuimov (ru)
- Yevgeny Kukarin (ru)
- Valery Kukov (ru)
- Roman Kulakov (ru)
- Nikita Kulkov (ru)
- Andrey Kumov (ru)
- Khadzhimurat Kurakhmaev (ru)
- Artur Kurbangaleev (ru)
- Abdulkhalik Kurbanov (ru)
- Ivan Kurbatov (ru)
- Yuri Kurganov (ru)
- Sergey Kurnosenko (ru)
- Aleksey Kuroedov (ru)
- Yuri Kuryagin (ru)
- Sergey Kustov (ru)
- Roman Kutuzov
- Boris Kuchin (ru)
- Oleg Kuyanov (ru)
- Anatoly Kyarov
- Ryafagat Khabibullin (ru)
- Kachibatyr Khairkizov (ru)
- Gazinur Khayrullin (ru)
- Radim Khalikov (ru)
- Aleksandr Khamitov (ru)
- Umarpasha Khanaliev (ru)
- Stanislav Kharin (ru)
- Nikolai Kharkov (ru)
- Moldi Khatuev (ru)
- Sergey Khikhin (ru)
- Oleg Khmelyov (ru)
- Andrey Khmelevskoy (ru)
- Vsevolod Khmyrov (ru)
- Igor Khomenko (ru)
- Grigory Khoperskov (ru)
- Aleksandr Khokhlachyov (ru)
- Anatoly Khramov (ru)
- Sergey Khraptsov (ru)

== See also ==
- Awards and decorations of the Russian Federation
- Awards and Emblems of the Ministry of Defense of the Russian Federation
- Awards of the Ministry of Internal Affairs of Russia
- Awards of the Federal Security Service of the Russian Federation
- Awards of the Federal Protective Service of the Russian Federation
- Awards of the Ministry for Emergency Situations of Russia
- Honorary titles of Russia
