= List of Heroes of the Russian Federation (U) =

This is a list of people who have been awarded the title Hero of the Russian Federation.

It has been awarded more than 970 times, of which more than 440 were posthumously.

== List of Heroes of the Russian Federation ==
- German Ugryumov
- Sergey Uzhentsev (ru)
- Dugerby Uzdenov (ru)
- Magomed Uzuev (ru)
- Vladimir Ulyanov (ru)
- Movldi Umarov
- Igor Urazaev (ru)
- Nurdin Usamov (ru)
- Vladimir Usachyov (ru)
- Yuri Usachyov
- Vakhit Usmaev (ru)
- Vladimir Ustinov
- Aleksey Ukhvatov (ru)
- Anton Ushakov (ru)
