= Movldi Umarov =

Movldi Abdul-Vakhabovich Umarov
- Мовлди Абдул-Вахабович Умаров
- Born: 29 January 1921; Novye Atagi, Mountain Republic
- Died: 11 January 1943 (aged 21); Skugorevo, Smolensk oblast, USSR
- Military career
- Allegiance: Soviet Union
- Branch: Red Army
- Service years: 1939 – 1943
- Rank: Senior lieutenant
- Conflicts: World War II; Winter War; Eastern Front
- Awards: Hero of the Russian Federation; Order of the Red Banner

Movldi Abdul-Vakhabovich Umarov (Russian: Мовлди Абдул-Вахабович Умаров; 29 January 1921 – 11 January 1943) was a Chechen lieutenant in the Red Army during World War II who was posthumously awarded the title Hero of the Russian Federation in 1996.

== Early life ==
Umarov was born on 29 January 1921 to a Chechen peasant family in Novye Atagi. After attending a rural school he went on to study at a trade school in Grozny before entering the Sernovodsky Pedagogical College, which he graduated from in 1939. In November that year he was drafted into the Red Army, and was initially assigned to a rifle regiment in Arkhangelsk. He first saw combat during the Winter War with Finland, during which he realized he wanted to become an officer. For his courage in the war he was allowed to enter the S.M.Kirov Leningrad Infantry Command School.

== World War II and death ==
As an active duty officer, Umarov first saw combat in World War II on 8 July 1941, not long after the start of Operation Barbarossa. He and other cadets at the military school were placed in a battalion in which they took part in the defense of Leningrad. Just eight days later he was promoted to lieutenant, but was badly wounded on 23 July. After recovering he became the deputy political commander of a rifle company. He was soon promoted to senior lieutenant and made commander of the 2nd Rifle Company within the 112th Separate Rifle Brigade. In that position he was killed in action on 11 January 1943 while he led his company in the defense of Skugorevo village. During the ensuing conflict he engaged in hand-to-hand combat in trenches, and continued fighting to the death even after suffering a broken arm. After his death he was awarded the Order of the Red Banner on 12 January for actions before the battle in Skugorevo, and on 16 May 1996 he was awarded the title Hero of the Russian Federation for his last stand. The medal was given to his brother Sultan.

== See also ==
- List of Heroes of the Russian Federation
