= List of Heroes of the Russian Federation (V) =

This is a list of people who have been awarded the title Hero of the Russian Federation.

It has been awarded more than 970 times, of which more than 440 were posthumously.

== List of Heroes of the Russian Federation ==
- Aleksandr Vaganov (ru)
- Leonid Valov (ru)
- Sergey Valsky (ru)
- Sergey Vandyshev (ru)
- Oleg Varlakov (ru)
- Valery Varfolomeev
- Viktor Vasenkov (ru)
- Sergey Vasilyov (ru)
- Vladimir Vasilyev (ru)
- Oleg Vasyuta (ru)
- Mikhail Vasyanin (ru)
- Ruslan Vakhitov (ru)
- Yuri Vashchuk (ru)
- Viktor Vdovkin (ru)
- Viktor Velichko (ru)
- Denis Vetchinov
- Oleg Viznyuk (ru)
- Nikolai Vinogradov (ru)
- Pavel Vinogradov
- Vladimir Vlasov (ru)
- Pavel Vlasov
- Sergey Vlasov (lieutenant colonel) (ru)
- Sergey Vlasov (major) (ru)
- Vasily Vodolazhsky (ru)
- Aleksandr Volkov (ru)
- Sergey Volkov
- Andrey Volovikov (ru)
- Nikolai Volodin (ru)
- Vladimir Volodkin (ru)
- Artur Voloshin (ru)
- Vera Voloshina
- Vitaly Volf (ru)
- Yuri Vornovsky (ru)
- Aleksey Vorobyov (ru)
- Boris Vorobyov (ru)
- Vyacheslav Vorobyov (ru)
- Dmitry Vorobyov (ru)
- Yuri Vorobyov
- Oleg Vorozhanin (ru)
- Sergey Voronin (ru)
- Andrey Voskresensky (ru)
- Igor Votintsev (ru)
- Sergey Vcherashnev (ru)
