= Ministerial awards of the Russian Federation =

== Ministry of Justice ==
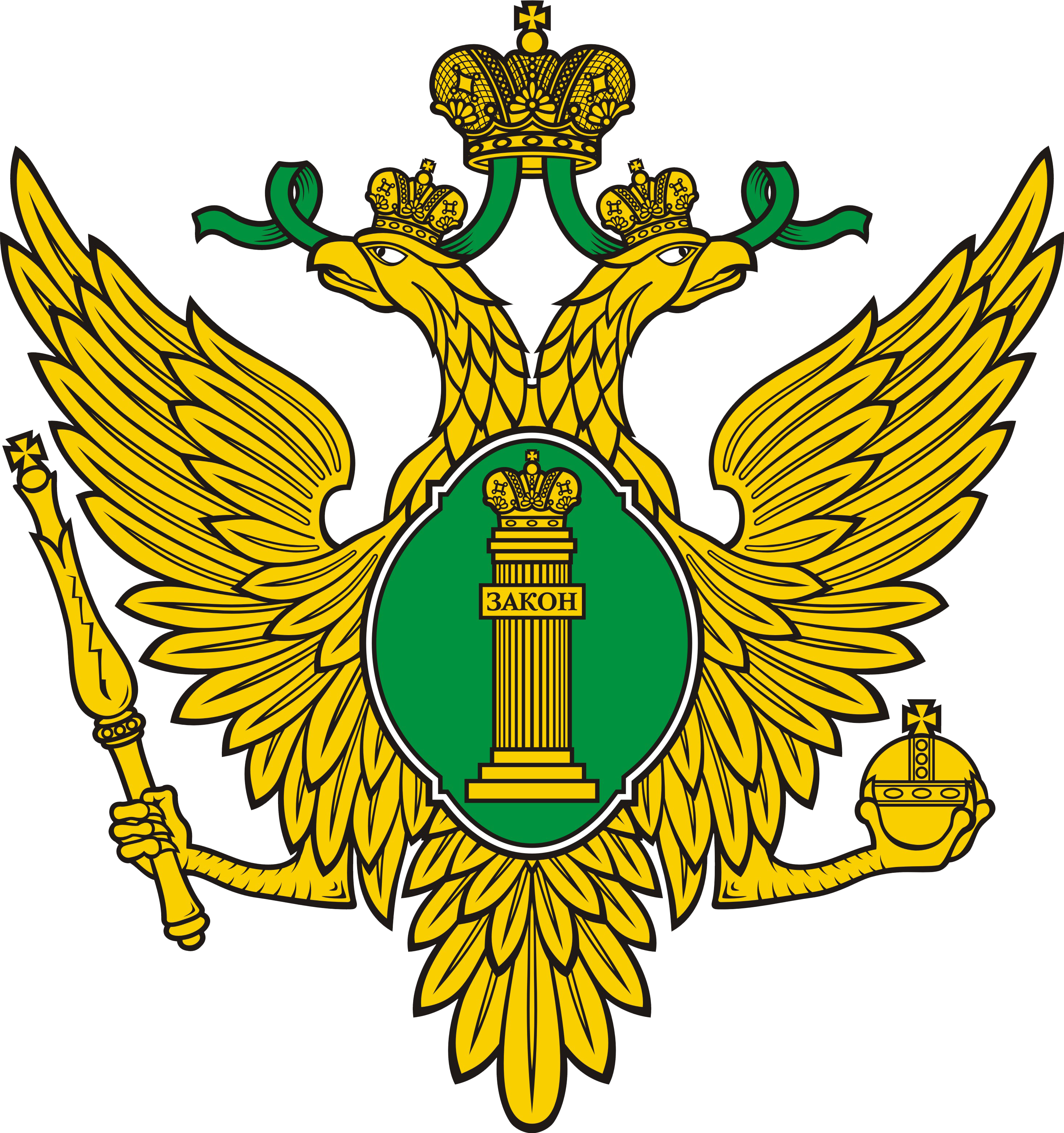

Award	Name (English/Russian)	Order	Inception Date	Award Criteria
	Medal of Anatoly Koni; Медаль Анатолия Кони		2000-02-25	Awarded to employees of the Ministry of Justice of the Russian Federation, to employees of the penal correction system of the Ministry of Justice of the Russian Federation and to persons who were referred from other federal executive authorities to the Ministry of Justice of the Russian Federation, with a length of service of more than 10 years in the Ministry of Justice of the Russian Federation.
	Medal "For Valour"; Silver Class; Медаль «За доблесть» серебрянная		2000-03-07	Awarded to members of the penal correction system of the Ministry of Justice of the Russian Federation and to other citizens of the Russian Federation for direct involvement in anti-terrorist operations, to restore constitutional order and the legitimate rights of the citizens of the Russian Federation; for active assistance to agencies and bodies of the penal system in the anti-terrorist operations to restore constitutional order and the legitimate rights of the citizens of the Russian Federation.
	Medal "For Valour"; Bronze Class; Медаль «За доблесть» бронзовая		2000-03-07	Awarded to members of the penal correction system of the Ministry of Justice of the Russian Federation and to other citizens of the Russian Federation for direct involvement in special events to fight crime, strengthen the rule of law, hostage rescue, search and arrest of dangerous criminals; for active assistance to agencies and bodies of the penal system in special events to fight crime, strengthen the rule of law, the release of hostages, search and arrest of dangerous criminals.
	Medal "For Diligence"; 1st Class; Медаль «За усердие» I степени		2000-04-27	Awarded after at least 10 years of service for skilful organisation of the bodies, institutions and organisations of the Ministry of Justice of the Russian Federation; for achieving high performance in office, operational, industrial-economic and educational activities; for strides in improving the professional and pedagogical skill; for personal contribution to training for the authorities and institutions of the justice and penal systems. Must hold the Medal for Zeal 2nd class<
	Medal "For Diligence"; 2nd Class; Медаль «За усердие» II степени		2000-04-27	Awarded after at least 5 years of service for skilful organisation of the bodies, institutions and organisations of the Ministry of Justice of the Russian Federation; for achieving high performance in office, operational, industrial-economic and educational activities; for strides in improving the professional and pedagogical skill; for personal contribution to training for the authorities and institutions of the justice and penal systems.
	Medal "For strengthening the prison system" 1st Class (Gold); Медаль «За укрепление уголовно-исполнительной системы» I степени (золотая)		2000-03-07	Awarded after at least 10 years of service to employees of the penal correction system of the Ministry of Justice of the Russian Federation or Ministry of Internal Affairs of the Russian Federation for special merit in strengthening and reforming the prison system of the Ministry of Justice of the Russian Federation.
	Medal "For strengthening the prison system" 2nd Class (Silver); Медаль «За укрепление уголовно-исполнительной системы» II степени (серебряная)		2000-03-07	Awarded after at least 5 years of service to employees of the penal correction system of the Ministry of Justice of the Russian Federation or Ministry of Internal Affairs of the Russian Federation for special merit in strengthening and reforming the prison system of the Ministry of Justice of the Russian Federation.
	Medal "In Memory Of The 125th Anniversary of the Prison System of Russia"; Медаль «В память 125-летия уголовно-исполнительной системы России»		2003-11-20	Awarded to institutions and organisations of the Ministry of Justice of the Russian Federation; Employees of federal bodies, the citizens of the Russian Federation and foreign nationals for achieving high performance ratings and making significant personal contributions to the development of institutions and organisations of the Ministry of Justice of the Russian Federation.
	Medal "In Memory of the 200th Anniversary of the Ministry Of Justice of Russia MOJ"; Медаль «В память 200-летия Минюста России»		2002-05-29	Awarded to institutions and organisations of the Ministry of Justice of the Russian Federation; Employees of federal bodies, the citizens of the Russian Federation and foreign nationals for achieving high performance ratings and making significant personal contributions to the development of institutions and organisations of the Ministry of Justice of the Russian Federation.
	Medal "Veteran of the Prison System"; Медаль «Ветеран уголовно-исполнительной системы»		2000-03-07; Abolished; 2007-10-16	Awarded to members of the penal correction system of the Ministry of Justice of the Russian Federation who faultlessly served for 25 or more years and were awarded the medals for long service I, II and III degrees; persons who were referred from other federal executive authorities and other bodies in the criminal-executive system of the Ministry of Justice of the Russian Federation, have experience of military service or service in the federal executive authorities of other bodies for a total of 25 years or more and were awarded the medals for long service I, II and III degrees and served in the prison system for at least 5 years.
	Medal "Veteran of the Penal System"; Медаль «Ветеран уголовно-исполнительной системы»		2005-11-10	Awarded to members of the penal correction system of the Ministry of Justice of the Russian Federation who faultlessly served for 25 or more years and were awarded the medals for long service I, II and III degrees; persons who were referred from other federal executive authorities and other bodies in the criminal-executive system of the Ministry of Justice of the Russian Federation, have experience of military service or service in the federal executive authorities of other bodies for a total of 25 years or more and were awarded the medals for long service I, II and III degrees and served in the prison system for at least 5 years. Replaces the previous medal for veteran of the prison system that was established in 2000.
	Medal "For Service"; 1st Class; Медаль «За службу» I степени		2000-02-25	Awarded to members of the penal correction system of the Ministry of Justice of the Russian Federation after 20 years of impeccable service; also to persons who served for and were referred from other federal executive authorities and other bodies in the criminal-executive system of the Ministry of Justice of the Russian Federation that have the required cumulative seniority.
	Medal "For Service"; 2nd Class; Медаль «За службу» II степени		2000-02-25	Awarded to members of the penal correction system of the Ministry of Justice of the Russian Federation after 15 years of impeccable service; also to persons who served for and were referred from other federal executive authorities and other bodies in the criminal-executive system of the Ministry of Justice of the Russian Federation that have the required cumulative seniority.
	Medal "For Service"; 3rd Class; Медаль «За службу» III степени		2000-02-25	Awarded to members of the penal correction system of the Ministry of Justice of the Russian Federation after 10 years of impeccable service; also to persons who served for and were referred from other federal executive authorities and other bodies in the criminal-executive system of the Ministry of Justice of the Russian Federation that have the required cumulative seniority.

=== Federal Registration Service ===
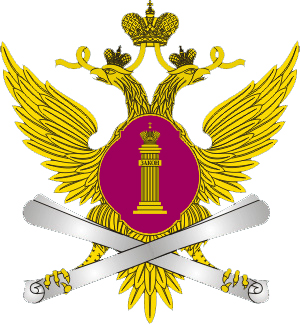

Award	Name (English/Russian)	Order	Inception Date	Award Criteria
	Medal "For Merits"; Federal Registration Service; Медаль «За заслуги» Федеральной регистрационной службы		2007-04-28	Awarded to employees of the structural subdivisions of the central apparatus of the Federal Registration Service, employees of territorial bodies of the Federal Registration Service, and other persons for outstanding personal merits in the development of the Federal Registration Service; for strengthening the rule of law, active participation and assistance in creating the rule of law; for actively protecting the rights and lawful interests of citizens.
	Title "Honoured Worker of the Federal Registration Service"; Звание «Почетный работник Федеральной регистрационной службы»		2007-04-28	Awarded to employees of structural units of the central apparatus of the Federal Registration Service, the employees of territorial bodies of the Federal Registration Service, and others for merit in the development of the Federal Registration Service; for management of a high professional standard; for active participation in carrying out economic reforms; for personal contribution in strengthening the rule of law to protect the rights and lawful interests of citizens.
	Chest Badge "For Impeccable Work"; Federal Registration Service; Нагрудный знак «За безупречный труд» Федеральной регистрационной службы		2007-04-28	Awarded to employees of the structural subdivisions of the central apparatus of the Federal Registration Service, employees of territorial bodies of the Federal Registration Service, and other persons for contribution in the development of the Federal Registration Service; for active work in planning and in training; for achieving high work standards and carrying out multiple tasks in connection with festive and memorable anniversaries; for the development and introduction of new forms and approaches to the execution of duties. Must have been with the department for a minimum of 3 years and have received previous recognition for work.

== Ministry of Transport ==

=== Medals ===
Award	Name (English/Russian)	Order	Inception Date	Award Criteria
	Medal "For Merit in the Development of the Transport Complex of Russia"; Медаль «За заслуги в развитии транспортного комплекса России»	No. 130	2005-10-18	Awarded to managers and organisations working on road, inland waterway, air, urban power, rail, sea and industrial transport systems, road management, geodesy and cartography, the staff of the Ministry, the central apparatus of the federal services and federal agencies under the supervision of the Ministry, its regional bodies and other persons for achievements in the implementation of government policies on transport, roads, Geodesy and Cartography, for significant contributions to the development of a modern transport system in the Russian Federation. To employees with at least 20 years experience, at least 3 of those in the Ministry and who were previously decorated as "Honoured Transport Worker".
	Medal "Pavel Melnikov"; Медаль «Павла Мельникова»	No. 130	2005-10-18	Awarded to managers and organisations working on road, inland waterway, air, urban power, rail, sea and industrial transport systems, road management, geodesy and cartography, the staff of the Ministry, the central apparatus of the federal services and federal agencies under the supervision of the Ministry, its regional bodies and other persons for achievement in high performance, improving the efficiency and quality of transport services, support and personal contribution to the development of transport and roads in municipalities and regions of the Russian Federation. To employees with at least 15 years experience, at least 2 of those in the Ministry and who were previously decorated.

=== Badges ===
Award	Name (English/Russian)	Order	Inception Date	Award Criteria
	Decoration "For Work and Progress"; Знак отличия «За труд и пользу»	No. 130	2005-10-18	Awarded for major personal achievements in public, scientific, industrial or other activities related to the implementation of specific and useful improvements to the transport sector of Russia.
	Decoration "Honoured Worker of Transport of Russia"; Нагрудный знак «Почетный работник транспорта России»	No. 130	2005-10-18	Awarded to managers and specialists of organisations of road, inland waterway, air, city electrical (including underground), rail, sea (including offshore trade, and specialised fishing ports, fishing ports except collectivised) and industrial transport, road facilities, the staff of the Ministry, the central apparatus of the federal services and federal agencies, under the supervision of the Ministry, its regional bodies and other persons for merit in the development of transport and freight forwarding activities, the construction and operation of highways, reconstruction and maintenance of navigable waterways and hydraulic equipment repair and maintenance of vehicles; for active economic reforms in the transport sector; for the development or introduction of new technology and techniques, advanced work methods, providing a significant economic impact; for successful and effective scientific activity; for efficient work in the control and supervision of transport and road services; for the development of draft legislation and regulations of the transport complex of Russia, improving health and safety, ensuring traffic safety and safety of goods, development of the social sphere; for merit in the field of training highly skilled workers for the transport sector.
	Title "Honoured Surveyor"; Звание «Почетный геодезист»	No. 130	2005-10-18	Assigned to employees of organisations of Geodesy and Cartography, Ministerial staff, central office of the Federal Agency of Geodesy and Cartography under the Ministry, its regional bodies and other persons for the great contributions in cartography and geodesy to ensure the economy and defence; for the development of draft legislative and normative acts on the geodetic and cartographic activities; for significant advances in the creation of map-based development of critical geo-economic systems, for the development of research on topical issues of the geodetic and cartographic science; for achievements in the training of qualified geodetic and cartographic specialists.
	Decoration "Honoured Motor Transport Worker"; Нагрудный знак «Почетный автотранспортник»	No. 130	2005-10-18	Awarded to employees and drivers of vehicles of Class 1 road transport organisations, officials of the Ministry, the central apparatus of Federal Road Agency under the Ministry, and other persons for merit in the development of road transport, improving work efficiency and the culture of public service; for the advancement of road transport technology, industrial production and transportation and freight services; for the development of draft legislation and regulations on the activities of road transport; for achieving high performance in the use of machinery, for road safety and accident prevention; for successful and effective scientific activity in the field of road transport and industry; for merit in the training of specialists and skilled workers for road transport.
	Decoration "Excellent in Air Transport"; Нагрудный знак «Отличник воздушного транспорта»	No. 130	2005-10-18	Awarded to employees of organisations of civil aviation, air transport aircraft of not lower than grade 1 and PANH (the use of aviation in the national economy) of not less than 2 class, the staff of the Ministry, the central apparatus of the Federal Agency of Air Transport under the Ministry, its regional bodies and other persons: for merit in the development of civil aviation, improving work efficiency and the culture of public service; for the development of draft legislation and regulations on air transport; for ensuring the safety of air traffic; for the development and implementation of science, technology and advanced technologies in air transport; for merit in the field of training skilled workers for air transport.
	Decoration of the Civil Aviation "For Accident-Free Flying Hours"; 3 classes – 1st, 2nd, 3rd class Нагрудный знак гражданской авиации «За безаварийный налет часов» трёх степеней — I, II, III степени	No. 130	2005-10-18	Awarded to members of civilian aircrews for thousands of accident free flying hours.
	Chest Badge "Excellence in Geodesy and Cartography"; Нагрудный знак «Отличник геодезии и картографии»	No. 130	2005-10-18	Awarded to employees of organisations of Geodesy and Cartography, Ministerial staff, central office of the Federal Agency of Geodesy and Cartography under the Ministry, its regional bodies and other persons for contributions in cartography and geodesy to assist the economy and defence sectors; the establishment of a geodetic map-base for the development of critical business systems; for the development of draft legislative and normative acts in the field of geodesy and cartography; for merit in the development of geodetic and cartographic science; for scientific and technical developments in geodesy and cartography; for merit in the preparation of highly qualified experts in the field of geodesy and cartography.
	Decoration "Honoured Worker of Electrical Transport"; Нагрудный знак «Почетный работник горэлектротранспорта»	No. 130	2005-10-18	Awarded to employees of organisations of urban electric transport and metro, the staff of the Ministry and other persons for merit in the development of urban electric transport and metro systems, enhancing work effectiveness and the culture of public service; for the development of legislative and normative acts on the electrical activity of urban transport and the metro; for the maintenance of effective science, innovation and rationalisation of work; for ensuring safe and reliable operation of rolling stock, equipment and devices that affect the safe working of urban electric transport and the metro.
	Decoration "Honoured Road Worker of Russia"; Нагрудный знак «Почетный дорожник России»	No. 130	2005-10-18	Awarded to employees of the organisation of road management, the staff of the Ministry and the Federal Road Agency under the Ministry, and other persons for success in the construction, repair and maintenance of roads and civil engineering works, ensuring safe and smooth traffic flow; for improving the technological infrastructure and production facilities; for achieving noteworthy results in the use of road technology, exemplary and accident-free work in the use of this technology; for the development of draft legislation and regulations on activities in the road sector; for the creation and development of new environmentally friendly types of road vehicles, machinery and equipment; for the maintenance of effective science, innovation and rationalisation of work in the highway sector; for developing and implementing innovative projects and new construction technologies, repair and maintenance of roads; for effective work to improve the economic, financial and legal activities in the road sector; for the development and introduction of modern methods of production in the highway sector; for merit in the field of education, training and retraining in the road sector.
	Decoration "Honoured Rail Worker of Russia"; Нагрудный знак «Почетный железнодорожник России»	No. 130	2005-10-18	Awarded to employees of the organisations of railway transportation, the staff of the Ministry, the central apparatus of the Federal Agency of Railway Transport, the Ministry and its territorial bodies and other persons: for merit in the development of rail transport, improving work efficiency and the culture of public service; for the development of draft legislative and normative acts on the work of railway transport; for the development and implementation of science, technology and advanced technology in rail transport; for merit in the field of training skilled railway workers.
	Decoration "Honoured Worker of Maritime Transport"; Нагрудный знак «Почетный работник морского флота»	No. 130	2005-10-18	Awarded to employees of organisations of maritime transport (including maritime trade and specialised fishing ports, fishing ports other than the collective farms), the staff of the Ministry, the Federal Agency of Maritime and River Transport, the Ministry, territorial authorities and other persons for merit in the development of maritime transport, work efficiency and the culture of public service; for great contribution to the development and implementation of measures aimed at improving the efficiency of the fleet, improving the organisation of work in industry and ports, faster growth in labour productivity; for the development of draft legislation and regulations on the activities of maritime transport; for the maintenance of effective science, innovation and rationalisation of work, achievements in the field of training of skilled workers for maritime transport; for participation in the development and improvement of legal acts regulating the activities of maritime transport; for improving safety conditions and services for accident-free navigation of vessels in difficult circumstances.
	Decoration "Honoured Polar Explorer"; Нагрудный знак «Почетный полярник»	No. 130	2005-10-18	Awarded to employees of organisations of maritime transport (including maritime trade and specialised fishing ports, fishing ports other than the collective farms), the staff of the Ministry, the central apparatus of the Federal Agency of Maritime and River Transport, the Ministry, territorial authorities and other persons for the performance of critical activities and tasks aimed at strengthening and developing maritime transport in the Arctic and Antarctic; for achievements in the development of the Northern Sea Route and the exemplary performance of specific tasks; for the development of draft legislation and regulations on the activities of maritime transport in the Arctic and Antarctic; for accident-free navigation and routing of ships in the Arctic and Antarctic ice in difficult conditions; for success in organising and conducting scientific research in the Arctic and Antarctic, inventiveness and innovations.
	Decoration "Honoured Worker of Industrial Transport"; Нагрудный знак «Почетный работник промышленного транспорта»	No. 130	2005-10-18	Awarded to workers of industrial transport, ministry officials, central office of the Federal Agency of Railway Transport, the Ministry and its territorial bodies and other persons for significant contribution to the development and implementation of comprehensive measures aimed at improving the efficiency of the transportation industry, accelerating the growth of labour productivity; for the development of draft legislation and regulations on industrial activity of transport; for achievement in science, innovation and rationalisation in the industrial development of transport; for merit in efforts resulting in accident-free industrial transportation; for improving safety conditions.
	Decoration "Honoured Worker of the River Fleet"; Нагрудный знак «Почетный работник речного флота»	No. 130	2005-10-18	Awarded to employees of organisations of inland waterways transport, the staff of the Ministry, the central apparatus of the Federal Agency of Maritime and River Transport, the Ministry and its territorial bodies and other persons for merit in the development of inland waterways transport, improving work efficiency and the culture of public service; for making a large contribution to the development and implementation of measures aimed at improving the efficiency of the fleet, improving the organisation of the work in the sector of industry and ports, faster growth in labour productivity; for the development of draft legislation and regulations on the activities of inland waterway transport; for active participation in the development and introduction of new techniques and technologies; for the maintenance of effective science, innovation and rationalisation of work and achievements in the field of training of skilled workers for inland waterways transport; for improving conditions and safety and providing accident-free navigation of vessels; for participation in the development and improvement of legal acts regulating activities on the inland waterway transport.
	Decoration "Honoured Worker of State Transport Supervision"; Нагрудный знак «Почетный работник госнадзора на транспорте»	No. 130	2005-10-18	Awarded to employees of the Ministry, the central apparatus of the Federal Service for Supervision of Transport under the Ministry and its territorial bodies exercising functions of control and supervision in the field of civil aviation, maritime (including offshore trade, specialised, fish ports, fishing ports other than the collective farms), inland waterways, rail, road (except for matters of road safety), industrial transport and roads, public inspectors and other persons for merit in ensuring safety in the performance of traffic and the use of vehicles and systems in their operations; for great contributions to the development and implementation of measures aimed at the granting of special permits, monitoring and supervisory functions, compliance with regulations for safe operation of vehicles and communications, protecting the environment from the harmful effects of transport; for fruitful work in the protection of consumer rights and legitimate interests of producers of transport services; for the performance of critical tasks to improve and enhance the performance of control and supervision in the field of transport.
	Decoration "Honoured Worker of Aerial Navigation of Russia"; Нагрудный знак «Почетный работник аэронавигации России»	No. ?	?	Awarded to employees of organizations of air navigation services to users of the airspace of the Russian Federation, to staff members of the Ministry, the central apparatus of the Federal Air Transport Agency under the authority of the Ministry, its territorial bodies and other persons, for service in ensuring a sustainable and functioning Unified Air Traffic Management System and Unified Aerospace Search and Rescue, for the efficient operation of air navigation services in the airspace of the Russian Federation Aerospace Search and Rescue and the culture of public service, for great contribution to the development and production of systems and electronic support operations of air traffic control, for active economic reform in a unified system of air traffic management and the Unified Aerospace Search and Rescue, for the provision of public services and the management of public property in the use of the airspace of the Russian Federation.

=== Safety Office of the Ministry of Transport of the Russian Federation ===
==== Medals ====
Award	Name (English/Russian)	Order	Inception Date	Award Criteria
	Medal "For Valour and Diligence"; 1st Class; Медаль «За усердие и доблесть» I степени	No. 300	2006-12-20	
	Medal "For Valour and Diligence"; 2nd Class; Медаль «За усердие и доблесть» II степени	No. 300	2006-12-20	

==== Badges ====
Award	Name (English/Russian)	Order	Inception Date	Award Criteria
	Chest Badge "Excellent"; Нагрудный знак «Отличник»	No. 300	2006-12-20	

== Federal Agency for Physical Culture and Sport ==
This Federal Agency was absorbed into The Ministry of Sport, Tourism and Youth Policy of the Russian Federation on 7 October 2008.

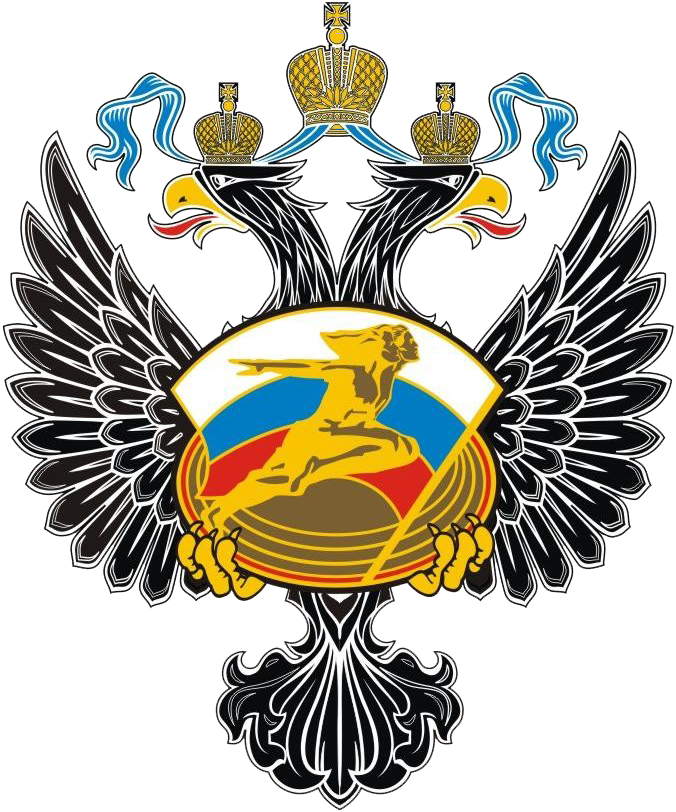

Award	Name (English/Russian)	Order	Inception Date	Award Criteria
	Honour Badge "For Merit in the Development of Physical Culture and Sports"; Почетный знак «За заслуги в развитии физической культуры и спорта»	No. 636	2006-09-25	Awarded to individuals for outstanding service in the field of physical culture and sport with experience of working in the field of physical culture and sport for at least 15 years. Worn on a neck ribbon.
	Medal of Peter Lesgaft; Медаль Петра Лесгафта	No. 111	2005-03-29	Awarded to citizens of the Russian Federation for great personal contribution to the development of sports science and education, with work experience in the field of physical education and sport of at least 10 years.
	Medal of Nikolai Ozerov; Медаль Николая Озерова	No. 112	2005-03-29	Awarded to citizens of the Russian Federation for the Promotion of Physical Education and Sports.
	Medal "80 Years Of The State Committee On Sports"; Медаль «80 лет Госкомспорту»	No. 465	2003-07-27	

== Ministry of Digital Development, Communications and Mass Media ==
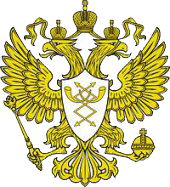

Award	Name (English/Russian)	Order	Inception Date	Award Criteria
	Title "Master Of Communications"; Звание «Мастер связи»	No. 46	2004-12-27	Awarded to highly professional employees assigned for 15 years or more in the areas of information technology and communication, for success in improving the telecommunications complex, for the implementation of federal and regional programmes of development in communications and informatics.
	Chest Badge "Honoured Radio Operator"; Нагрудный знак «Почётный радист»	No. 35	2007-03-14	Awarded for distinguished service, organisational skills and achievements in broadcasting science, engineering, production and exploitation.

=== Security Services of the Ministry of the Russian Federation for Communications and Information ===
==== Medals ====
Award	Name (English/Russian)	Order	Inception Date	Award Criteria
	Medal "For Merits"; 1st Class; Медаль «За заслуги» I степени		2004	Awarded to employees of departmental security, Ministry of the Russian Federation for Communications and Mass Media, other employees of federal bodies of the state, citizens of the Russian Federation and foreign citizens. For the completion of tasks performed in emergency situations under life-threatening conditions.
	Medal "For Merits"; 2nd Class; Медаль «За заслуги» II степени		2004	Awarded to employees of departmental Security, Ministry of the Russian Federation for Communications and Information, other employees of federal bodies of the state, citizens of the Russian Federation and foreign citizens. Awarded for the skilful organisation of departmental security of the Ministry of the Russian Federation for Communications and Mass media and its structural subdivisions, agencies and organisations; for success in the improvement of professional skills; for personal contribution in training of the structural units, organisations, agencies and institutions of departmental security.
	Medal "For Longevity to the Federal State Unitary Enterprise Communication Security"; 1st Class; Медаль «за выслугу лет ФГУП Связь-безопасность» I степени		2004	Awarded to departmental security personnel for their conscientious work and a corresponding length of service 15 years.
	Medal "For Longevity to the Federal State Unitary Enterprise Communication Security"; 2nd Class; Медаль «за выслугу лет ФГУП Связь-безопасность» II степени		2004	Awarded to departmental security personnel for their conscientious work and a corresponding length of service 10 years.
	Medal "For Longevity to the Federal State Unitary Enterprise Communication Security"; 3rd Class; Медаль «за выслугу лет ФГУП Связь-безопасность» III степени		2004	Awarded to departmental security personnel for their conscientious work and a corresponding length of service 5 years.

==== Badges ====
Award	Name (English/Russian)	Order	Inception Date	Award Criteria
	Chest Badge "Honoured Worker of Special Communications"; Нагрудный знак «Почётный работник спецсвязи»		1999	Awarded to employees of the Special Connection, as well as other citizens or groups who actively promote the development of the Special Connection. For many years of distinguished work and achievements in meeting the challenges of improvised communications; for great contribution to the development and implementation of activities aimed at implementing the activities of the Special Connection; for the performance of critical tasks to improve and enhance the effectiveness of the service of the Special Connection; for outstanding contribution to the development and implementation of legislative and regulatory acts relating to the activities of the Special Connection; for the actions that have led to a significant increase in the level of technical knowledge and compliance with the rules of technical operation of machinery and equipment.

== Ministry of Industry and Trade ==

Award	Name (English/Russian)	Order	Inception Date	Award Criteria
	Honorary Title "Honoured Aircraft Engineer"; Почетное звание «Почетный авиастроитель»	No. 8	2008-06-27	Attributable to state civil servants of the Ministry of Industry and Trade of the Russian Federation, Federal Agency for Technical Regulation and Meteorology, their territorial bodies, employees of subordinate organisations and businesses who have served the industry for at least 15 years of fruitful work and great contribution to the development of aviation, the creation of competitive high-tech products and the introduction of new technologies and the latest energy-efficient and environmentally sound technologies, using advanced scientific research in the field of nanotechnology, for successful and effective scientific, for rational and inventive activity, for the development and implementation of activities aimed at improving production efficiency and quality of production, for significant contribution to training in the aviation industry organisations, for international cooperation in the field of aviation.
	Chest Badge "Honoured Miner"; Нагрудный знак «Почетный горняк»	No. 8	2008-06-27	Attributable to workers, professionals, civil servants, heads of organisations, mining and other industries related to mining, the central staff of the Ministry, the Federal Agency for merit and personal contribution to improving the quality, competitive products, the introduction of new and modern equipment and advanced technology, design and implementation of activities aimed at improving the efficiency of production, the wide dissemination of best practices and who worked in the industry for at least 15 years, and for workers directly employed in mining for not less than 10 years.
	Honorary Title "Honoured Industrial Engineer"; Почетное звание «Почетный машиностроитель»	No. 8	2008-06-27	Attributable to workers, professionals, civil servants, heads of engineering organisations, central staff members of the Ministry, the Federal Agency for merit and contribution to the development of engineering, the creation of competitive, high-tech products and the introduction of new technology and emerging technologies with the use of advanced scientific research in the field of nanotechnology, successful and effective scientific, rational and inventive activity, the development and implementation of activities aimed at improving the efficiency of production and quality of production, widespread dissemination of best practices and worked in the industry for at least 15 years.
	Honorary Title "Honoured Metallurgist"; Почетное звание «Почетный металлург»	No. 8	2008-06-27	Assigned to workers, professionals, civil servants, heads of organisations and enterprises of the metallurgical industry for the recycling of metals, the central staff of the Ministry, the Federal Agency: for merit and contribution in the development of the metallurgical industry and businesses recycling metal, the creation and implementation of new technologies in the latest energy-efficient and environmentally sound technologies, successful and effective scientific, rational and inventive activity, the development and implementation of activities aimed at improving the efficiency of production, the wide dissemination of best practices and who worked in the industry for at least 15 years, and for workers directly employed in hazardous working conditions for not less than 10 years.
	Honorary Title "Honoured Metrologist"; Почетное звание «Почетный метролог»	No. 8	2008-06-27	Assigned to specialists, officials, heads of organisations, the central apparatus of the Ministry, Federal Agency, who worked in the field of measurements for not less than 15 years, having achieved good results and who have contributed significantly to the development of the metrological service in the establishment and improvement of the standards base of the country, in the development of new methods and tools of measurement to ensure the needs of the economy, environment, health, defence and security of the country in organising and conducting state metrological controls and supervision, carrying out international activities in the field of metrology.
	Honorary Title "Honoured Worker of the Lumber Industry"; Почетное звание «Почетный работник лесной промышленности»	No. 8	2008-06-27	Attributable to workers, professionals, civil servants, heads of organisations of the forest, pulp and paper, wood and lumber industry, the employees of the central apparatus of the Ministry, the Federal Agency: for merit and contributions in the development of the industry, the creation and introduction of new competitive technologies, the latest energy-efficient and environmentally sound technology, using advanced scientific research in the field of nanotechnology, the successful and effective scientific, rational and inventive activity, the development and implementation of activities aimed at improving the efficiency of production, quality products, wide dissemination of best practices and who served in industry for at least 15 years.
	Honorary Title "Honoured Worker of Textiles and Light Industry"; Почетное звание «Почетный работник текстильной и легкой промышленности»	No. 8	2008-06-27	Assigned to workers, professionals, civil servants, heads of organisations of textile and light industry, employees of the central apparatus of the Ministry, the Federal Agency: for merit and great contribution to the creation of competitive products using the latest energy-efficient and environmentally friendly technologies, for successful and effective scientific, rational and inventive activity, the development and implementation of activities aimed at improving the efficiency of production and product quality, wide dissemination of best practices and who worked in the industry for at least 15 years.
	Honorary Title "Honoured Shipbuilder"; Почетное звание «Почетный судостроитель»	No. 8	2008-06-27	Assigned to workers, professionals, civil servants, heads of organisations of the shipbuilding industry, the central staff of the Ministry, the Federal Agency: for merit and contribution to the development of shipbuilding, the creation of competitive high-tech products, the introduction of new technologies and the latest energy-efficient and environmentally friendly technologies using advanced scientific research in the field of nanotechnology, the successful and effective scientific, rational and inventive activity, the development and implementation of activities aimed at improving the efficiency of production and quality of products, services and labour, for achievements in the field of the environment and ecology, for significant contribution to training members of the shipbuilding industry, the wide dissemination of best practices and who worked in the industry for at least 15 years.
	Honorary Title "Honoured Chemist"; Почетное звание «Почетный химик»	No. 8	2008-06-27	Attributable to workers, professionals, civil servants, heads of organisations of the chemical and petrochemical industries, the central staff of the Ministry, the Federal Agency: for achievements and high performance, the creation of innovative energy-efficient and environmentally sound technology, using advanced scientific research in the field of nanotechnology, for increasing production efficiency and product quality and who worked in the industry for at least 15 years, or to workers directly involved in dangerous production and hazardous working conditions for not less than 10 years.
	Breast badge "For Merit in Standardisation and Quality" in memory of V. V. Boitsov; Нагрудный знак «За заслуги в области стандартизации и качества» имени В. В. Бойцова	No. 8	2008-06-27	Awarded to highly skilled employees of the central apparatus of ministries, federal agencies, local authorities and organisations that have made a significant contribution to the implementation of national policies and performance in the field of standardisation and quality control of products aimed at ensuring the safety of human life and health, the prevention of damage to property and the environment, who have at least 5 years experience in this field.
	Breast Badge "Medal of Small Arms Maker M.T. Kalashnikov"; Нагрудный Знак «Медаль имени конструктора стрелкового оружия М.Т. Калашникова»	No. 55	2008-02-14	Awarded to employees of enterprises, organisations and institutions of the military-industrial complex, the central staff of the Ministry, the Federal Agencies involved with enterprises producing small arms and ammunition, for 15 years or more and that have made a significant contribution to the development, creation and production of modern small arms, parts and ammunition using advanced scientific research in the field of nanotechnology, improving quality and competitiveness, in promotion to the world market and that have made a significant contribution to the strengthening of our defence capabilities.

== Ministry of Energy ==
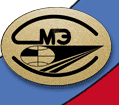

Award	Name (English/Russian)	Order	Inception Date	Award Criteria
	Honorary Title "Honoured Worker of the Oil and Energy Complex"; Почетное звание «Почетный работник топливно-энергетического комплекса»	No. 11	2008-07-14	Attributable to workers, professionals, employees, managers of organisations operating in the sphere of the oil and energy complex and the petrochemical industry, the central staff of the Ministry and its territorial bodies and subordinate organisations of the Ministry, for exemplary performance of duties, a long and excellent career, concrete contributions to the improvement of product quality, productivity and other advances in the subject of availability of employment in the organisations of the oil and energy complex for a duration of at least 25 years.
	Honorary Title "Honoured Worker of the Gas Industry"; Почетное звание «Почетный работник газовой промышленности»	No. 11	2008-07-14	Attributable to workers, professionals, civil servants, heads of organisations of the gas industry and gas pipelines, the central staff of the Ministry and its territorial bodies and subordinate organisations of the Ministry, for merit and great contributions to the development of the gas industry, the opening and development of gas fields, the creation and introduction of new techniques and technologies, successful and effective scientific research, rational and inventive activity, the development and implementation of activities aimed at improving the efficiency of production, the wide dissemination of best practices and who worked in the industry for at least 15 years.
	Honorary Title "Honoured Oil Worker"; Почетное звание «Почетный нефтяник»	No. 11	2008-07-14	Attributable to workers, professionals, civil servants, heads of organisations of the gas industry and gas pipelines, the central staff of the Ministry and its territorial bodies and subordinate organisations of the Ministry, for merit and great contributions to the development of the gas industry, the opening and development of gas fields, the creation and introduction of new techniques and technologies, successful and effective scientific research, rational and inventive activity, the development and implementation of activities aimed at improving the efficiency of production, the wide dissemination of best practices and who worked in the industry for at least 15 years.
	Honorary Title "Honoured Refinery Worker"; Почетное звание «Почетный нефтехимик»	No. 11	2008-07-14	Attributable to workers, professionals, civil servants, heads of organisations of the gas industry and gas pipelines, the central staff of the Ministry and its territorial bodies and subordinate organisations of the Ministry, for merit and great contributions to the development of the gas industry, the opening and development of gas fields, the creation and introduction of new techniques and technologies, successful and effective scientific research, rational and inventive activity, the development and implementation of activities aimed at improving the efficiency of production, the wide dissemination of best practices and who worked in the industry for at least 15 years.
	Honorary Title "Honoured Constructor"; Почетное звание «Почетный строитель»	No. 11	2008-07-14	Attributable to workers, professionals, civil servants, heads of organisations of the gas industry and gas pipelines, the central staff of the Ministry and its territorial bodies and subordinate organisations of the Ministry, for merit and great contributions to the development of the gas industry, the opening and development of gas fields, the creation and introduction of new techniques and technologies, successful and effective scientific research, rational and inventive activity, the development and implementation of activities aimed at improving the efficiency of production, the wide dissemination of best practices and who worked in the industry for at least 15 years.
	Honorary Title "Honoured Worker of the Coal Industry"; Почетное звание «Почетный работник угольной промышленности»	No. 11	2008-07-14	Attributable to workers, professionals, civil servants, heads of organisations of coal, oil shale and peat industry, the central staff of the Ministry and its territorial bodies and subordinate organisations of the Ministry, for merit and great contributions to the development of the coal mining, oil shale and peat industry, the creation of and introduction of new techniques and technologies, successful and effective scientific research, rational and inventive activities, the development and implementation of activities aimed at improving the efficiency of production, the wide dissemination of best practices and who worked in the coal industry for at least 15 years.
	Honorary Title "Honoured Miner"; Почетное звание «Почетный шахтер»	No. 11	2008-07-14	Awarded for long-term conscientious work and achievement, for high job performance, mountain masters, chiefs, the mechanics of ground stations, their deputies and assistants acting under construction and coal (shale), coal mines and mountainous areas, with work related experience of at least 15 years, leading business professions (miners, purification, cutter, driver, mountain excavation machines) for not less than 10 years, and in sections with at least 20 years.
	Chest Badge "Honoured Miner"; Нагрудный знак «Почетный горняк»	No. 11	2008-07-14	Attributable to workers, professionals, civil servants, heads of organisations, mining and other industries related to mining, the central staff of the Ministry, the Federal Agency for merit and personal contribution to improving the quality, competitive products, the introduction of new and modern equipment and advanced technology, design and implementation of activities aimed at improving the efficiency of production, the wide dissemination of best practices and who worked in the industry for at least 15 years, and for workers directly employed in mining for not less than 10 years.
	Honorary Title "Honoured Power Engineer"; Почетное звание «Почетный энергетик»	No. 11	2008-07-14	Assigned to workers, professionals, employees, managers of organisations in the field of electricity and renewable energy sources, the central staff of the Ministry and its territorial bodies and subordinate organisations of the Ministry; for the creation and introduction of new techniques and technologies, successful and effective scientific research, rational and inventive activities, the development and implementation of activities aimed at improving the efficiency of production, the wide dissemination of best practices and who worked in the industry for at least 15 years.
	Chest Badge "Miner's Glory"; 1st class Нагрудный знак «Шахтерская слава» I степени	No. 11	2008-07-14	Awarded to workers, professionals and leaders of coal mining, oil shale and peat, the coal mine construction industry, for excellent work and seniority, for being constantly engaged either in underground or open air coal (shale) mine construction assignments with continuous years of service of at least 10 years. To other employees of the industry that support the activities and organisations of the coal (oil shale) mining industry and construction, with continuous service of at least 20 years.
	Chest Badge '"Miner's Glory"; 2nd Class; Нагрудный знак «Шахтерская слава» II степени	No. 11	2008-07-14	Awarded to workers, professionals and leaders of coal mining, oil shale and peat, the coal mine construction industry, for excellent work and seniority, for being constantly engaged either in underground or open air coal (shale) mine construction assignments with continuous years of service of at least 8 years. To other employees of the industry that support the activities and organisations of the coal (oil shale) mining industry and construction, with continuous service of at least 15 years.
	Chest Badge "Miner's Glory"; 3rd Class; Нагрудный знак «Шахтерская слава» III степени	No. 11	2008-07-14	Awarded to workers, professionals and leaders of coal mining, oil shale and peat, the coal mine construction industry, for excellent work and seniority, for being constantly engaged either in underground or open air coal (shale) mine construction assignments with continuous years of service of at least 5 years. To other employees of the industry that support the activities and organisations of the coal (oil shale) mining industry and construction, with continuous service of at least 10 years.
	Chest Badge "Labour Glory"; 1st Class; Нагрудный знак «Трудовая слава» I степени	No. 11	2008-07-14	Awarded to employees of organisations of the coal industry for sterling work with continuous years of service of 20 years. Some employees may receive the award without regard to length of service for specific outstanding achievements in their work, in this case, the following higher class may not be awarded for a minimum of 3 years.
	Chest Badge "Labour Glory"; 2nd Class; Нагрудный знак «Трудовая слава» II степени	No. 11	2008-07-14	Awarded to employees of organisations of the coal industry for sterling work with continuous years of service of 15 years. Some employees may receive the award without regard to length of service for specific outstanding achievements in their work, in this case, the following higher class may not be awarded for a minimum of 3 years.
	Chest Badge "Labour Glory"; 3rd Class; Нагрудный знак «Трудовая слава» III степени	No. 11	2008-07-14	Awarded to employees of organisations of the coal industry for sterling work with continuous years of service of 10 years. Some employees may receive the award without regard to length of service for specific outstanding achievements in their work, in this case, the following higher class may not be awarded for a minimum of 3 years.

== Ministry of Health and Social Development ==
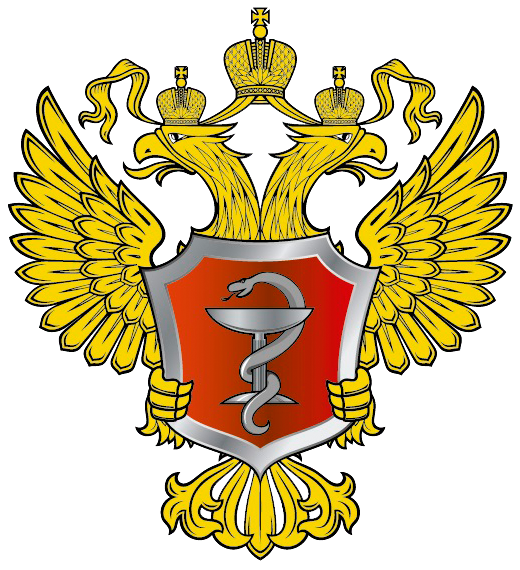

Award	Name (English/Russian)	Order	Inception Date	Award Criteria
	Badge of Distinction "Merciful"; Знак отличия «Милосердие»	No. 400	2005-06-10	Awarded to citizens for charitable work and sponsorship of charitable activities in the social sphere, the sphere of education, health care and for their mercy.
	Chest Badge "Excellence in Health Care"; Нагрудный Знак «Отличник Здравоохранения»	No. 400	2005-06-10	Awarded to employees of government health organisations, state, municipal and private health systems for diligent and impeccable work, professional skills, with at least 15 years of experience in the health sector.
	Chest Badge "Excellence in the Social and Labour Sphere"; Нагрудный знак «Отличник социально-трудовой сферы»	No. 400	2005-06-10	Awarded to individuals with at least 15 years of fruitful work experience in social activities and special merit in social and labour issues related to development in the field of: Labour, Employment and Social Protection, the formation and development of public service; of pensions, social services and insurance; social protection of families, women and children, elderly citizens and veterans, citizens discharged from military service, and their families; development and improvement of labour legislation, employment and social protection; implementation of state supervision and control over observance of labour legislation and labour protection; improvement of the wages and improved living standards and incomes of the public, improved personnel policy.

== Ministry of Agriculture ==
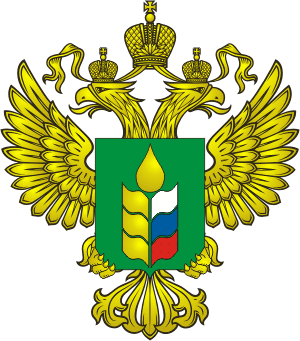

Award	Name (English/Russian)	Order	Inception Date	Award Criteria
	Gold Medal "For Contribution to the Development of Agriculture"; Золотой Медаль «За вклад в развитие агропромышленного комплекса»	No. 971 No. 156 No. 62	2003-06-26; Abolished; 2009-04-22; Re-Established; 2009-02-13	Awarded to professional employees of enterprises, institutions, organisations, state, municipal and private firms that have made a great contribution to improving the efficiency of agricultural production, quality and competitiveness of products, as well as in its promotion to the world market, development of new products, advanced technologies, and for many years of distinguished work; to employees of educational and scientific institutions of agro-profile for significant contributions to the development of educational, scientific, and technical innovation; to representatives of creative intelligence to create products that promote a positive image of rural workers; to federal public servants and local authorities exercising functions in the development and management of agro-industries, fisheries management systems and addressing the socio-economic development of rural areas; to government, public and political figures in Russia and abroad, who have made a significant personal contribution to the development of the Russian agro-industrial and fisheries sector; to organisations operating in the field of agricultural and fisheries products; to members of the media for constant attention to the problems of the agricultural and fisheries sector; associations that work with the Ministry of Agriculture of Russia in the field of agricultural and fisheries products, for their assistance in implementing national projects.
	Silver Medal "For Contribution to the Development of Agriculture"; Серебряная Медаль «За вклад в развитие агропромышленного комплекса»	No. 971 No. 156 No. 62	2003-06-26; Abolished; 2009-04-22; Re-Established; 2009-02-13	Awarded to professional employees of enterprises, institutions, organisations, state, municipal and private firms that have made a great contribution to improving the efficiency of agricultural production, quality and competitiveness of products, as well as in its promotion to the world market, development of new products, advanced technologies, and for many years of distinguished work; to employees of educational and scientific institutions of agro-profile for significant contributions to the development of educational, scientific, and technical innovation; to representatives of creative intelligence to create products that promote a positive image of rural workers; to federal public servants and local authorities exercising functions in the development and management of agro-industries, fisheries management systems and addressing the socio-economic development of rural areas; to government, public and political figures in Russia and abroad, who have made a significant personal contribution to the development of the Russian agro-industrial and fisheries sector; to organisations operating in the field of agricultural and fisheries products; to members of the media for constant attention to the problems of the agricultural and fisheries sector; associations that work with the Ministry of Agriculture of Russia in the field of agricultural and fisheries products, for their assistance in implementing national projects.

== Ministry of Natural Resources and Ecology ==
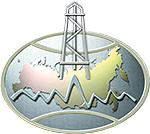

Award	Name (English/Russian)	Order	Inception Date	Award Criteria
	Chest Badge "Honoured Underground Surveyor"; Нагрудный знак «Почетный разведчик недр»	No. 290	2006-12-21	Awarded to civil servants of the Ministry of Natural Resources of the Russian Federation, the federal service, federal agencies under the supervision of the Ministry and their territorial bodies, employees of subordinate organisations and enterprises and other persons who worked in geology for at least 15 years of fruitful work and with great contributions to the development of mineral resources in Russia, the scientific rationale for sending exploration work, the opening of mineral deposits, the introduction of scientific and technological advances in the practice of geological exploration work, for outstanding results achieved in production activities, for merit in training and education of the geological staff and successful cooperation with foreign countries in the field of geology.
	Chest Badge "Honoured Conservationist"; Нагрудный знак «Почетный работник охраны природы»	No. 290	2006-12-21	Awarded to civil servants of the Ministry of Natural Resources of the Russian Federation, the federal services and federal agencies under the supervision of the Ministry and their territorial bodies, employees of subordinate organisations and other persons who worked in the field of nature conservation and environmental protection for at least 15 years and who made a great contribution to nature conservation, biodiversity, environmental safety, education and the promotion of environmental awareness.
	Chest Badge "Honoured Forestry Worker"; Нагрудный знак «Почетный работник леса»	No. 290	2006-12-21	Awarded to civil servants of the Ministry of Natural Resources of the Russian Federation, the federal service, federal agencies under the supervision of the Ministry and their territorial bodies, employees of subordinate organisations and other persons who have served in the forest at least 15 years of fruitful work and outstanding achievements in the use of and protection of the forest resources of the Russian Federation and the regrowth of forests; for managing forest resources, environmental issues, protection, control and regulation of the wildlife and habitat management, improving the economic, scientific and technical methods of forest management, education and training of forestry services employees.
	Chest Badge "Honoured Worker of Water Management"; Нагрудный знак «Почетный работник водного хозяйства»	No. 290	2006-12-21	Awarded to civil servants of the Ministry of Natural Resources of the Russian Federation, the federal service, federal agencies under the supervision of the Ministry and their territorial bodies, employees of subordinate organisations and other persons who worked in the water sector at least 15 years of fruitful work and outstanding achievements in the development of water resources, the implementation of state control for the use and protection of water, rehabilitation of water resources, introduction of scientific and technological advances in water works, education and training in Professional Water Management, the successful cooperation with foreign countries in the field of water management
	Chest Badge "Veteran of Water Management"; Нагрудный знак «Ветеран водного хозяйства»	No. 290	2006-12-21	Awarded to civil servants of the Ministry of Natural Resources of the Russian Federation, the federal service, federal agencies under the supervision of the Ministry and their territorial bodies, employees of subordinate organisations and other persons who have served in the water management sector for at least 25 years with great personal contributions to the development of water economy, environmental education, environmental education and the promotion of knowledge in this field.
	Chest Badge "Excellent Underground Surveyor"; Нагрудный знак «Отличник разведки недр»	No. 290	2006-12-21	Awarded to civil servants of the Ministry of Natural Resources, the Federation, the federal service, federal agencies under the supervision of the Ministry and their territorial bodies, employees of subordinate organisations and other persons who have served in Geology for at least 10 years, for great contributions to the study of subsurface geology, prospecting and exploration of mineral deposits.
	Chest Badge "Excellent Conservationist"; Нагрудный знак «Отличник охраны природы»	No. 290	2006-12-21	Awarded to civil servants of the Ministry of Natural Resources of the Russian Federation, the federal service, federal agencies under the supervision of the Ministry and their territorial bodies, employees of subordinate organisations and other persons who have served in the field of conservation for more than 10 years, for great contributions to the protection of the environment and natural resources, environmental safety, development of environmental education and promotion of environmental awareness.
	Chest Badge "Excellent Water Management"; Нагрудный знак «Отличник водного хозяйства»	No. 290	2006-12-21	Awarded to civil servants of the Ministry of Natural Resources of the Russian Federation, the federal service, federal agencies under the supervision of the Ministry and their territorial bodies, employees of subordinate organisations and other persons who have served in the water management system for at least 10 years, for great contributions to the management, restoration and protection of water resources and in ensuring the population and economy with quality water.
	Chest Badge "For Merits to Nature Reserves"; Нагрудный знак «За заслуги в заповедном деле»	No. 290	2006-12-21	Awarded to civil servants of the Ministry of Natural Resources of the Russian Federation, the federal service, federal agencies under the supervision of the Ministry and their territorial bodies, employees of subordinate organisations and other persons who worked in the environmental field for at least 10 years, for great contributions to the reserve, a system of specially protected natural areas, conservation, research and ecological activities, maintaining and developing state natural reserves and national parks.

== Ministry of Culture ==
Award	Name (English/Russian)	Order	Inception Date	Award Criteria
	Chest Badge "For Achievement In Culture"; Нагрудный знак «За достижения в культуре»	No. 527	1998-10-30	Awarded to workers of cultural institutions, organisations and enterprises of the Ministry of Culture of the Russian Federation, having experience in the industry for at least 10 years and having made a personal contribution to the promotion and preservation of native culture and art.
	Chest Badge "For Great Achievements"; Нагрудный знак «За высокие достижения»	No. 428	2006-09-06	Awarded to employees with work experience in the Ministry of Culture of least 7 years.

== Ministry of Regional Development ==
Award	Name (English/Russian)	Order	Inception Date	Award Criteria
	Chest Badge "Honoured Architect Of Russia"; Нагрудный знак «Почетный архитектор России»	No. 13	2005-02-22	
	Chest Badge "Honoured Worker Of Housing Utility Establishments Of Russia"; Нагрудный знак «Почетный работник жилищно-коммунального хозяйства России»	No. 13	2005-02-22	
	Chest Badge "Honoured Constructor Of Russia"; Нагрудный знак «Почетный строитель России»	No. 13	2005-02-22	

== Commission For Human Rights Of The Russian Federation ==
Award	Name (English/Russian)	Order	Inception Date	Award Criteria
	Medal "Hasten To Do Good"; Медаль «Спешите делать добро»	No. 17	2005-07-18	

== See also ==
- List of orders, decorations, and medals of the Russian Federation
- List of awards of independent services of the Russian Federation
- Honorary titles of the Russian Federation
- Awards and decorations of the Soviet Union
