= List of Heroes of the Russian Federation (Y) =

This is a list of people who have been awarded the title Hero of the Russian Federation.

It has been awarded more than 970 times, of which more than 440 were posthumously.

== List of Heroes of the Russian Federation ==
- Yuri Yakimenko (ru)
- Pavel Yakimkin (ru)
- Aleksandr Yakovlev (ru)
- Yuri Yakovlev (ru)
- Farvat Yakupov (ru)
- Dzhabrail Yamadaev
- Ruslan Yamadaev
- Sulim Yamadaev
- Valery Yanin (ru)
- Irina Yanina
- Aleksandr Yanklovich (ru)
- Aleksandr Yaroshenko (ru)
- Nikolai Yartsev (ru)
- Dzhafyas Yafarov (ru)
- Pyotr Yatsenko (ru)
- Anatoly Yatskov
- Igor Yatskov (ru)
- Sergey Yashkin (ru)
- Yunus-bek Yevkurov
- Sergey Yevlampiev (ru)
- Sergey Yevlanov (ru)
- Valery Yevnevich (ru)
- Vyacheslav Yevskin (ru)
- Mark Yevtyukhin
- Dmitry Yegorov (ru)
- Pyotr Yegorov (ru)
- Lyubov Yegorova
- Vladimir Yedamenko (ru)
- Vladimir Yelizarov (ru)
- Vladimir Yeliseev (ru)
- Dmitry Elistratov (ru)
- Aleksandr Yepaneshnikov (ru)
- Pyotr Yeremeev (ru)
- Oleg Yeremetsky (ru)
- Viktor Yerin
- Vadim Yermakov (ru)
- Vitaly Yermakov (ru)
- Oleg Yermakov (ru)
- Dmitry Yerofeev (ru)
- Ruben Yesayan
- Arkady Yefanov (ru)
- Mikhail Yefremov
- Vladimir Yurchenko (ru)
- Gleb Yurchenko (ru)
- Yuri Yurchenko (ru)
- Fyodor Yurchikhin
- Vasily Yuryev (ru)
- Damir Yusupov (ru)
- Sergey Yushkov (ru)
