= Awards of the Federal Security Service of the Russian Federation =

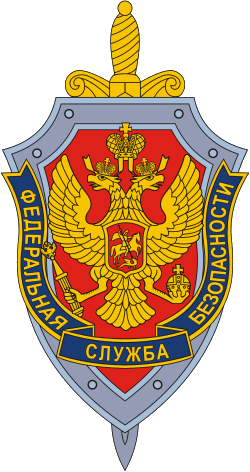

The Federal Security Service (FSB) of the Russian Federation is the main domestic security agency of the Russian Federation and the main successor agency of the Soviet KGB. Its main responsibilities are counter-intelligence, internal and border security, counter-terrorism, and surveillance. Along with other federal ministries and agencies, the FSB created its own departmental awards subordinate to the state awards. This is a detailed list of these awards.

== Federal Security Service ==
=== Medals ===
The medals in the section below are placed in their correct order of precedence in accordance with the latest Order of the head of the FSB.

Award	Name (English/Russian)	Order	Inception Date	Award Criteria
	Medal "For Merit in Counter-Intelligence" Медаль «За заслуги в контрразведке»	No. 513 - No. 413 - No. 415	2004-07-29 ---------- 2010-08-27 ---------- 2014-07-21	Departmental order establishing this award was identified but is not yet openly published by decision of the FSB of Russia.
	Medal "For Merit in Combating Terrorism" Медаль «За заслуги в борьбе с терроризмом»	No. 46 - No. 413 - No. 415	2005-01-31 ---------- 2010-08-27 ---------- 2014-07-21	Departmental order establishing this award was identified but is not yet openly published by decision of the FSB of Russia.
	Medal "For Merit in Safeguarding Economic Security" Медаль «За заслуги в обеспечении экономической безопасности»	No. 48 - No. 413 - No. 415	2005-01-31 ---------- 2010-08-27 ---------- 2014-07-21	Departmental order establishing this award was identified but is not yet openly published by decision of the FSB of Russia.
	Medal "For Merit in Intelligence" Медаль «За заслуги в разведке»	No. 340 - No. 413 - No. 415	2004-05-12 ---------- 2010-08-27 ---------- 2014-07-21	Departmental order establishing this award was identified but is not yet openly published by decision of the FSB of Russia.
	Medal "For Merit in Border Activities" Медаль «За заслуги в пограничной деятельности»	No. 49 - No. 413 - No. 415	2005-01-31 ---------- 2010-08-27 ---------- 2014-07-21	Departmental order establishing this award was identified but is not yet openly published by decision of the FSB of Russia.
	Medal "For Merit in Ensuring Information Security" Медаль «За заслуги в обеспечении информационной безопасности»	No. 288 - No. 413 - No. 415	2006-06-16 ---------- 2010-08-27 ---------- 2014-07-21	Departmental order establishing this award was identified but is not yet openly published by decision of the FSB of Russia.
	Medal "For Distinction in Special Operations" Медаль «За отличие в специальных операциях»	No. 524 - No. 413 - No. 415	2001-10-04 ---------- 2010-08-27 ---------- 2014-07-21	Awarded to military and civilian personnel of the Federal Security Service for outstanding achievements and distinction in the planning and execution of approved FSB special operations crucial to the security of the Russian Federation. The director of the FSB of Russia may award the medal to other citizens of the Russian Federation for their active promotion of state security agencies in the conduct of special operations and for direct participation in such operations. The medal is awarded with swords to members of security agencies who distinguished themselves during direct participation in a special operation carried out with the use of military or special weapons. The medal is awarded without swords to employees of security agencies and persons providing active assistance in organizing and conducting special operations by state security authorities, for outstanding achievements in the development of a special operation, and to those who distinguished themselves during direct participation in a special operation carried out without the use of military or special weapons.
	Decoration "For Bravery" Знак отличия «За Храбрость»	No. ? - No. 413 - No. 415	2005-10 ---------- 2010-08-27 ---------- 2014-07-21	Departmental order establishing this award is not yet identified and is not yet openly published by decision of the FSB of Russia.
	Medal "For Valour" Медаль «За доблесть»	No. 437 - No. 415	2010-09-10 ---------- 2014-07-21	Departmental order establishing this award is not yet identified and is not yet openly published by decision of the FSB of Russia.
	Medal "For Diligence" Медаль «За усердие»	No. 159 - No. 415	2011-04-20 ---------- 2014-07-21	Departmental order establishing this award is not yet identified and is not yet openly published by decision of the FSB of Russia.
	Medal "For Distinction in Counterintelligence" Медаль «За отличие в контрразведке»	No. ? - No. 413 - No. 415	? ---------- 2010-08-27 ---------- 2014-07-21	Departmental order establishing this award was identified but is not yet openly published by decision of the FSB of Russia.
	Medal "For Distinction in Intelligence" Медаль «За отличие в разведке»	No. ? - No. 413 - No. 415	2004-05 ---------- 2010-08-27 ---------- 2014-07-21	Departmental order establishing this award was identified but is not yet openly published by decision of the FSB of Russia.
	Medal "For Distinction in Combating Terrorism" Медаль «За отличие в борьбе с терроризмом»	No. ? - No. 413 - No. 415	? ---------- 2010-08-27 ---------- 2014-07-21	Departmental order establishing this award was identified but is not yet openly published by decision of the FSB of Russia.
	Medal "For Distinction in Safeguarding Economic Security" Медаль «За отличие в обеспечении экономической безопасности»	No. ? - No. 413 - No. 415	? ---------- 2010-08-27 ---------- 2014-07-21	Departmental order establishing this award was identified but is not yet openly published by decision of the FSB of Russia.
	Medal "For Distinction in Border Activities" Медаль «За отличие в пограничной деятельности»	No. ? - No. 413 - No. 415	? ---------- 2010-08-27 ---------- 2014-07-21	Departmental order establishing this award was identified but is not yet openly published by decision of the FSB of Russia.
	Medal "For Distinction in Ensuring Information Security" Медаль «За отличие в обеспечении информационной безопасности»	No. ? - No. 413 - No. 415	2006-06 ---------- 2010-08-27 ---------- 2014-07-21	Departmental order establishing this award was identified but is not yet openly published by decision of the FSB of Russia.
	Medal "For Participation in Counterterrorism Operations" Медаль «За Участие В Контртеррористической Операции»	No. 522 - No. 413 - No. 415	2001-10-04 ---------- 2010-08-27 ---------- 2014-07-21	Awarded to military and civilian personnel of the Federal Security Service of Russia for the planning, support to or participation in counterterrorism operations. The Director of the Federal Security Service of Russia may award the medal to other citizens for their active promotion of security agencies in the conduct of anti-terrorist operation. May be awarded for the faithful execution of official duties while in the area of counter-terrorist operations in the territory of the North Caucasus region for a period of not less than seven months; awarded regardless of the amount of time in theatre for personal and meritorious involvement in counter-terrorism operations in the North Caucasus.
	Medal "For Distinction in Labour" Медаль «За отличие в труде»	No. ? - No. 413 - No. 415	2006-09 ---------- 2010-08-27 ---------- 2014-07-21	Departmental order establishing this award was identified but is not yet openly published by decision of the FSB of Russia.
	Medal "For Strengthening Military Cooperation" Медаль «За Боевое Содружество»	No. 521 - No. 413 - No. 415	2001-10-04 ---------- 2010-08-27 ---------- 2014-07-21	Awarded to military and civilian personnel of units of the Federal Security Service of Russia, to other citizens of the Russian Federation and to foreign nationals, for efforts to strengthen military cooperation, for effective cooperation with law enforcement and military activities aimed at strengthening the security of the Russian Federation. More precisely, it is awarded to members of security agencies for personal merit in strengthening military cooperation between military units, law enforcement bodies and special service units of the Russian Federation and foreign states; for direct participation in conjunction with law enforcement agencies and special service units of foreign states in successful operational searches and other activities in foreign countries aimed at strengthening the security of the Russian Federation; to employees of other federal bodies of executive power recognised as military service, to law enforcement officers: for significant contribution to the achievement of positive results obtained in the course of joint activities with the organs of state security; for proactive action which resulted in the success of a special operation conducted by security agencies; for significant contribution to the organization, coordination and cooperation with state security authorities; for other services in strengthening military cooperation with state security authorities; to other citizens of the Russian Federation: for actively promoting security agencies in their mission of ensuring the security of the Russian Federation; for other services in strengthening military cooperation with state security authorities; to foreign nationals (with the consent of the Director of the Federal Security Service of Russia) for carrying out operational searches and other activities jointly with state security authorities aimed at strengthening the security of the Russian Federation; for other services in strengthening military cooperation with state security agencies.
	Medal "For Distinguished Military Service"; 1st Class Медаль «За Отличие В Военной Службе» I степени	No. 269 - No. 413 - No. 415	1997-06-16 ---------- 2010-08-27 ---------- 2014-07-21	Awarded to servicemen of organs of the Federal Security Service of Russia for conscientious service and 20 years seniority.
	Medal "For Distinguished Military Service"; 2nd Class Медаль «За Отличие В Военной Службе» II степени	No. 269 - No. 413 - No. 415	1997-06-16 ---------- 2010-08-27 ---------- 2014-07-21	Awarded to servicemen of organs of the Federal Security Service of Russia for conscientious service and 15 years seniority.
	Medal "For Distinguished Military Service"; 3rd Class Медаль «За Отличие В Военной Службе» III степени	No. 269 - No. 413 - No. 415	1997-06-16 ---------- 2010-08-27 ---------- 2014-07-21	Awarded to servicemen of organs of the Federal Security Service of Russia for conscientious service and 10 years seniority.
	Medal "For Interaction with the FSB of Russia" Медаль «За взаимодействие с ФСБ России»	No. 277 - No. 642 - No. ? - No. 413 - No. 415	2001-05-16 ---------- 2001-12-07 ---------- 2002-11-14 ---------- 2010-08-27 ---------- 2014-07-21	Awarded to citizens of the Russian Federation and to foreign nationals, for assistance in solving the tasks assigned to the authorities of the Federal Security Service (FSB), for personal services to strengthen the security of the Russian Federation, for productive activities aimed at protecting and strengthening the constitutional system of the Russian Federation. May be awarded to: employees and officials of the federal bodies of executive power, which provide for military service and law enforcement, for significant personal contribution to the achievement of positive results obtained in the course of joint activities with the security agencies; for significant personal contribution to the organization, coordination and mutual interacting with other security forces; for other achievements in strengthening the cooperation and interaction with security agencies; to other citizens of the Russian Federation: for actively promoting private security agencies in ensuring the security of the Russian Federation, for the protection and strengthening of the constitutional system of the Russian Federation; for other merit in strengthening cooperation and collaboration with security agencies; to foreign nationals (with the consent of the Director of the Federal Security Service of Russia):for effective measures aimed at strengthening the security of the Russian Federation, the protection and strengthening of the constitutional system of the Russian Federation; for other services in the organization or coordination and cooperation, for strengthening the community of security agencies.
	Commemorative Medal "100 Years of Organs of State Security" Памятная Медаль «100 лет Органам Государственной Безопасности»	No. ?	2017	Departmental order establishing this award was not yet identified and is potentially not yet published by the FSB of Russia.

=== Decorations ===
Award	Name (English/Russian)	Order	Inception Date	Award Criteria
	Prize of the FSB Премия ФСБ	No. ?	2006-02-07	First awarded by the KGB of the USSR between 1978 and 1988, it was re introduced in 2006 by the FSB of Russia. It is awarded to authors of literary and musical works, television and radio programs, movies, and to actors and artists for the creation of works of a high artistic level enhancing the image of the Federal Security Service and for objective coverage of their activities.
	Breast Badge "Honoured Member of Counter-Intelligence" Нагрудный знак «Почетный сотрудник контрразведки»	No. ?	1994-03-22	Ministerial Order not yet found and is possibly unpublished to this date.
	Breast Badge "For Service in Counter-Intelligence"; 1st Class Нагрудный знак «За службу в контрразведке» I Степени	No. 256	1994-07-12	Ministerial Order was identified but not yet found in its entirety for translation to this article.
	Breast Badge "For Service in Counter-Intelligence"; 2nd Class Нагрудный знак «За службу в контрразведке» II Степени	No. 256	1994-07-12	Ministerial Order was identified but not yet found in its entirety for translation to this article.
	Breast Badge "For Service in Counter-Intelligence"; 3rd Class Нагрудный знак «За службу в контрразведке» III Степени	No. 256	1994-07-12	Ministerial Order was identified but not yet found in its entirety for translation to this article.
	Decoration "For Scientific Achievements" Знак отличия «За научные достижения»	No. ?	2001–11	Ministerial Order not yet found and is possibly unpublished to this date.
	Decoration "For Training Cadre Personnel" Знак отличия «За подготовку кадров»	No. ?	2002–03	Ministerial Order not yet found and is possibly unpublished to this date.
	Decoration "For Combating Terrorism" Знак отличия «За борьбу с терроризмом»	No. ?	?	Ministerial Order not yet found and is possibly unpublished to this date.

0019

== Border Guard Service of the FSB ==
On March 11, 2003 Russian president Vladimir Putin changed the status of the Border Guard Service from an independent service into a branch of the Federal Security Service.

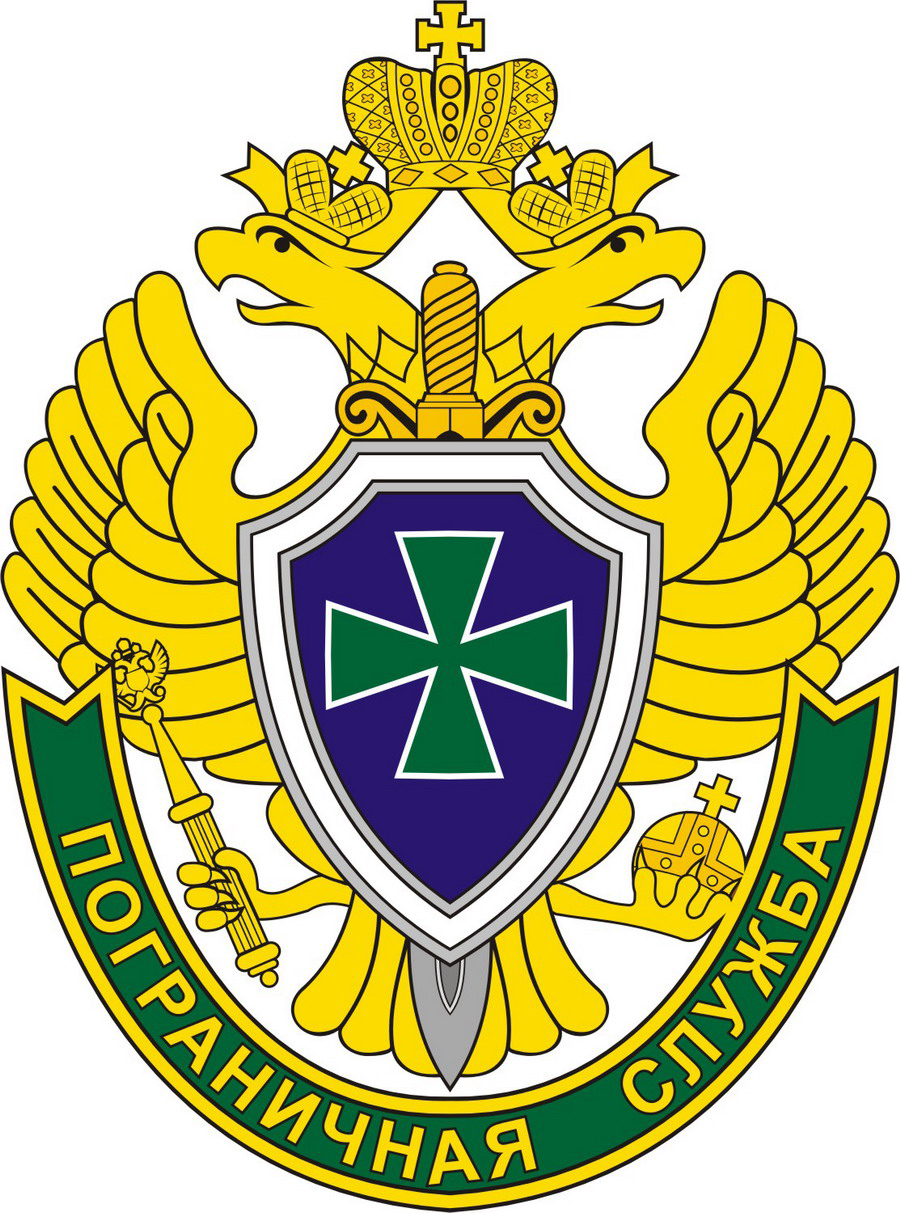

=== Decorations ===
Award	Name (English/Russian)	Order	Inception Date	Award Criteria
	Decoration "For Merit" 1st class Знак отличия «За Заслуги» I степени	No. ? - No. ?	1995-02-05 ---------- 2006-01-22	Awarded to soldiers of the Border Guard Service of the F.S.B. for skilful organisation and flawless performance of service in the protection of state borders; for distinction during exercises or manoeuvres.
	Decoration "For Merit" 2nd class Знак отличия «За Заслуги» II степени	No. ? - No. ?	1995-02-05 ---------- 2006-01-22	Awarded to soldiers of the Border Guard Service of the F.S.B. for skilful organisation and flawless performance of service in the protection of state borders; for distinction during exercises or manoeuvres.
	Badge "For Service in the Caucasus" Знак «За службу на Кавказе»	No. ? - No. ?	1995-02-19 ---------- 2005-01	Awarded to military and civilian components, units of the Border Guard Service of the FSB deployed in the North Caucasus and the Caucasus, for distinction in the performance of military duties with the highest rates in the service and training that have made a concrete contribution to the protection and defence of state borders, strengthening military discipline and education personnel.
	Badge "For Service in the Arctic" Знак «За службу в Заполярье»	No. ? - No. ?	1997-04-01 ---------- 2005-01	Awarded to military and civilian components, units of the Border Guard Service of the FSB deployed in the Arctic, for distinction in the performance of military duties with the highest rates in the service and training that have made a concrete contribution to the protection and defence of state borders, strengthening military discipline and education personnel.
	Badge "For Service in the Far East" Знак «За службу на дальнем востоке»	No. ? - No. ?	1997-04-01 ---------- 2005-01	Awarded to military and civilian components, units of the Border Guard Service of the FSB deployed in the Far East, the Pacific or the North East for distinction in the performance of military duties with the highest rates in the service and training that have made a concrete contribution to the protection and defense of state borders, strengthening military discipline and education personnel.
	Decoration "Excellent Border Guard" 1st class Знак отличия «Отличник Погранслужбы» I степени	No. ?	2004-08-25	Retained from the Federal Border Service post 2003 who had itself retained it from the Soviet Border Guards Service of the KGB post 1991. Awarded to soldiers, sailors, sergeants and petty officers of Border Troops, or to other soldiers urgently enlisted in assisting the Border Guard Service, for exemplary performance of duties in the protection of the state border of the Russian Federation, skillful actions to apprehend violators of the border, for displaying courage, perseverance, endurance, excellent performance in combat training, and for military discipline.
	Decoration "Excellent Border Guard" 2nd class Знак отличия «Отличник Погранслужбы» II степени	No. ?	2004-08-25	Retained from the Federal Border Service post 2003 who had itself retained it from the Soviet Border Guards Service of the KGB post 1991. Awarded to soldiers, sailors, sergeants and petty officers of Border Troops, or to other soldiers urgently enlisted in assisting the Border Guard Service, for exemplary performance of duties in the protection of the state border of the Russian Federation, skillful actions to apprehend violators of the border, for displaying courage, perseverance, endurance, excellent performance in combat training, and for military discipline.
	Decoration "Excellent Border Guard" 3rd class Знак отличия «Отличник Погранслужбы» III степени	No. ?	2004-08-25	Retained from the Federal Border Service post 2003 who had itself retained it from the Soviet Border Guards Service of the KGB post 1991. Awarded to soldiers, sailors, sergeants and petty officers of Border Troops, or to other soldiers urgently enlisted in assisting the Border Guard Service, for exemplary performance of duties in the protection of the state border of the Russian Federation, skillful actions to apprehend violators of the border, for displaying courage, perseverance, endurance, excellent performance in combat training, and for military discipline.
	Breast badge "For Service on the Border" 100 Patrols Нагрудный знак «За пограничную службу» 100 патрулей	No. ?	?	Retained from the Federal Border Service post 2003 in this new variant. Awarded for 100 patrols on the state borders of the Russian Federation. A patrol consists of two four-hour outings in a 24-hour period.
	Breast badge "For Service on the Border" 200 Patrols Нагрудный знак «За пограничную службу» 200 патрулей	No. ?	?	Retained from the Federal Border Service post 2003 in this new variant. Awarded for 200 patrols on the state borders of the Russian Federation. A patrol consists of two four-hour outings in a 24-hour period.
	Breast badge "For Service on the Border" 300 Patrols Нагрудный знак «За пограничную службу» 300 патрулей	No. ?	?	Retained from the Federal Border Service post 2003 in this new variant. Awarded for 300 patrols on the state borders of the Russian Federation. A patrol consists of two four-hour outings in a 24-hour period.

== See also ==
- Federal Security Service
- Awards of the Federal Protective Service of the Russian Federation.
- Awards and Emblems of the Ministry of Defense of the Russian Federation
- Awards of the Ministry of Internal Affairs of Russia
- Awards of the Ministry for Emergency Situations of Russia
- Awards of the Federal Protective Service of the Russian Federation
- Ministerial awards of the Russian Federation
- Awards and decorations of the Russian Federation
- Honorary titles of the Russian Federation
- Awards and decorations of the Soviet Union

== Other sources ==
- Border Guard Service of the FSB Official site in Russian
- Internet Portal Russian Symbols In Russian
- Russian Legal Library - Decrees and Regulations Consultant Plus In Russian
- Ilia Kuzmichev & Alexander Triphon (2004). Award System of Uniformed Departments of the Russian Federation. Moscow: Bratishka.
- GARANT Legal Information Portal Latest Ministerial Orders - In Russian
