= Awards of the Federal Protective Service of the Russian Federation =

The official logo of the FSO.

The Federal Protective Service (FSO) of the Russian Federation is a federal government agency mandated by the relevant laws with the tasks related to the protection of many high-ranking state officials including the President of Russia, as well as certain federal properties such as the Kremlin.

== Federal Protective Service of the Russian Federation ==
=== Medals ===
Award	Name (English/Russian)	Order	Inception Date	Award Criteria
	Medal "For Distinction in the Performance of Special Assignments" Медаль "За отличие при выполнении специальных заданий"	№ 318	2005-08-19	Awarded to military personnel of the Federal Protective Service for the successful completion of special assignments, and for initiative, perseverance and professionalism.
	Medal "For Military Valour" Медаль "За воинскую доблесть"	№ 318	2005-08-19	Awarded to soldiers of the federal organs of state protection for exemplary performance of duties, initiative, perseverance and professional skills.
	Medal "For Military Cooperation" Медаль "За Боевое Содружество"	№ 32	2003-03-29	Awarded to citizens of the Russian Federation or foreign citizens for merit in strengthening military cooperation; for significant contribution to the achievement of positive results obtained in the course of joint activities; for specific assistance to the Russian FSO in dealing with a task.
	Medal "For Interaction" Медаль "За взаимодействие"	№ ?	?	Departmental order not yet found in its entirety for translation to this article.
	Medal "For Distinction in Labour" Медаль "За отличие в труде"	№ 318	2005-08-19	Awarded to civilian personnel of the Federal Protective Service with service of at least 15 years for concrete contributions to the tasks entrusted to the FSO and for long and dedicated work.
	Medal "Veteran of the Federal Bodies of State Protection" Медаль "Ветеран федеральных органов государственной охраны"	№ 318	2005-08-19	Awarded to citizens dismissed from military service, in the reserve, retired, who served in the Federal Protective Service for at least 20 years and actively participated in the patriotic education and vocational training of young employees of the Federal Protective Service.
	Medal "125 years of the Organs of State Protection of Russia" Медаль "125 лет органам государственной охраны России"	№ ?	2006	Departmental order not yet found in its entirety for translation to this article.
	Medal "130 years of the Organs of State Protection of Russia" Медаль "130 лет органам государственной охраны России"	№ ?	2011	Departmental order not yet found in its entirety for translation to this article.
	Jubilee Medal "70 years of the Presidential Regiment" Памятная юбилейная медаль "70 лет Президентскому полку"	№ 491	2005-12-12	Departmental medal of the Federal Protective Service.
	Medal "80 years of the Presidential Regiment" Mедаль "80 лет Президентскому полку"	№ ?	2016	Departmental medal of the Federal Protective Service.
	Medal "100 years of organs of state security" Mедаль "100 лет органам государственной безопасности"	№ 200/DSP	2017-04-19	Departmental commemorative medal of the Federal Protective Service.
	Medal "For Distinction in Military Service; 1st Class Медаль "За Отличие В Военной Службе"; I степени	№ 391	1997-12-05	Awarded to personnel of the Federal Protective Service of the Russian Federation for 20 years of good service.
	Medal "For Distinction in Military Service; 2nd Class Медаль "За Отличие В Военной Службе"; II степени	№ 391	1997-12-05	Awarded to personnel of the Federal Protective Service of the Russian Federation for 15 years of good service.
	Medal "For Distinction in Military Service; 3rd Class Медаль "За Отличие В Военной Службе"; III степени	№ 391	1997-12-05	Awarded to personnel of the Federal Protective Service of the Russian Federation for 10 years of good service.

=== Decorations ===
Award	Name (English/Russian)	Order	Inception Date	Award Criteria
	Breast badge "Honoured Fellow of the Federal Protective Service" Нагрудный знак "Почетный сотрудник Федеральной службы охраны"			
	Breast badge "For Honour and Dignity in Service to the Homeland" Нагрудный знак "За честь и достоинство в службе Отечеству"			
	Breast badge "For Service in the FSO of Russia" Нагрудный знак "За службу в ФСО России"			
	Breast badge "25 Years of Distinguished Service" Нагрудный знак "25 лет безупречной службы"			
	Breast badge "For Merit" 1st class Нагрудный знак "За заслуги" I степени			
	Breast badge "For Merit" 2nd class Нагрудный знак "За заслуги" II степени			
	Breast badge "For Merit" 3rd class Нагрудный знак "За заслуги" III степени			
	Breast badge "Excellent FSO of Russia" Нагрудный знак "Отличник ФСО России"			
	Breast badge "Flag of the FSO of Russia" Нагрудный знак "Флаг ФСО России"			
	Breast badge "Presidential Regiment" Нагрудный знак "Пресидентский полк"		1993	
	Breast badge "80 Years of the Presidential Regiment" Нагрудный знак "80 лет Пресидентский полк"		2016	

== Service of Special Communications and Information (Spetsviaz) ==
On March 11, 2003 Russian president Vladimir Putin reorganized the Federal Agency for Government Communication and Information FAPSI from an independent service into the Service of Special Communications and Information (Spetsviaz) of the FSB. On August 7, 2004, Spetsviaz was incorporated as a structural sub unit of the Federal Protective Service (FSO).

=== Medals ===
Award	Name (English/Russian)	Order	Inception Date	Award Criteria
	Medal "For Military Valour" 1st class Медаль "За воинскую доблесть" I степени	№ 7	2004-01-16	
	Medal "For Military Valour" 2nd class Медаль "За воинскую доблесть" II степени	№ 7	2004-01-16	
	Medal "For Military Cooperation" Медаль "За боевое содружество"	№ 6	2004-01-16	
	Medal "For Distinction in Labour" Медаль "За отличие в труде"			

=== Decorations ===
Award	Name (English/Russian)	Order	Inception Date	Award Criteria
	Breast badge "Honoured Fellow of Spetsviaz" Нагрудный знак "Почетный сотрудник Спецсвязи"			
	Breast badge "Participant in Combat Operations" Нагрудный знак "Участник боевых действий"			
	Breast badge "Spetsviaz Veteran" Нагрудный знак "Ветеран Спецсвязи"			

== See also ==
- Federal Protective Service (Russia)
- Kremlin Regiment
- Federal Security Service (Russia)
- FAPSI
- Awards and decorations of the Russian Federation
- Ministerial Awards of the Russian Federation
- List of awards of independent services of the Russian Federation
- Honorary titles of the Russian Federation
- Awards and decorations of the Soviet Union

== Other sources ==
- Official awards page of the Federal Protective Service of the Russian Federation (in Russian)
- Internet Portal Russian Symbols In Russian
- Russian Legal Library - Decrees and Regulations Consultant Plus In Russian
- Ilia Kuzmichev & Alexander Triphon (2004). Award System of Uniformed Departments of the Russian Federation. Moscow: Bratishka.
- GARANT Legal Information Portal Latest Ministerial Orders - In Russian
