= Honorary titles of Russia =

Professional and/or social honorary titles

Coat of Arms of the Russian Federation

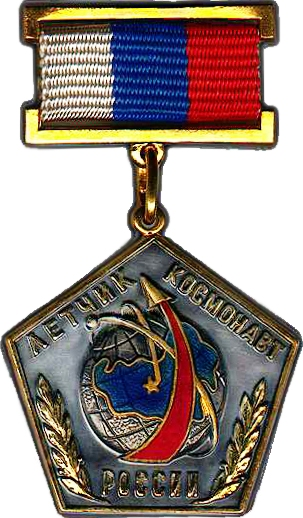
Breast badge of Pilot-Cosmonaut of the Russian Federation

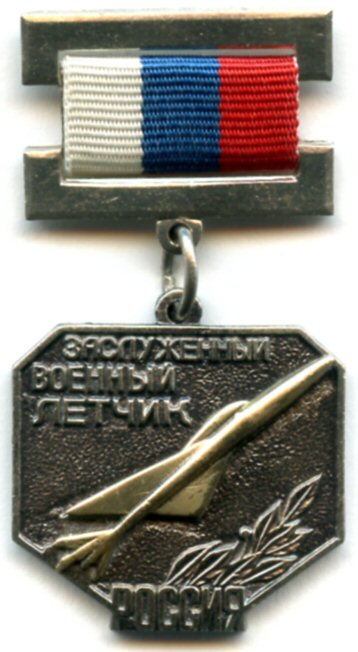
Breast badge of Honoured Military Pilot of the Russian Federation

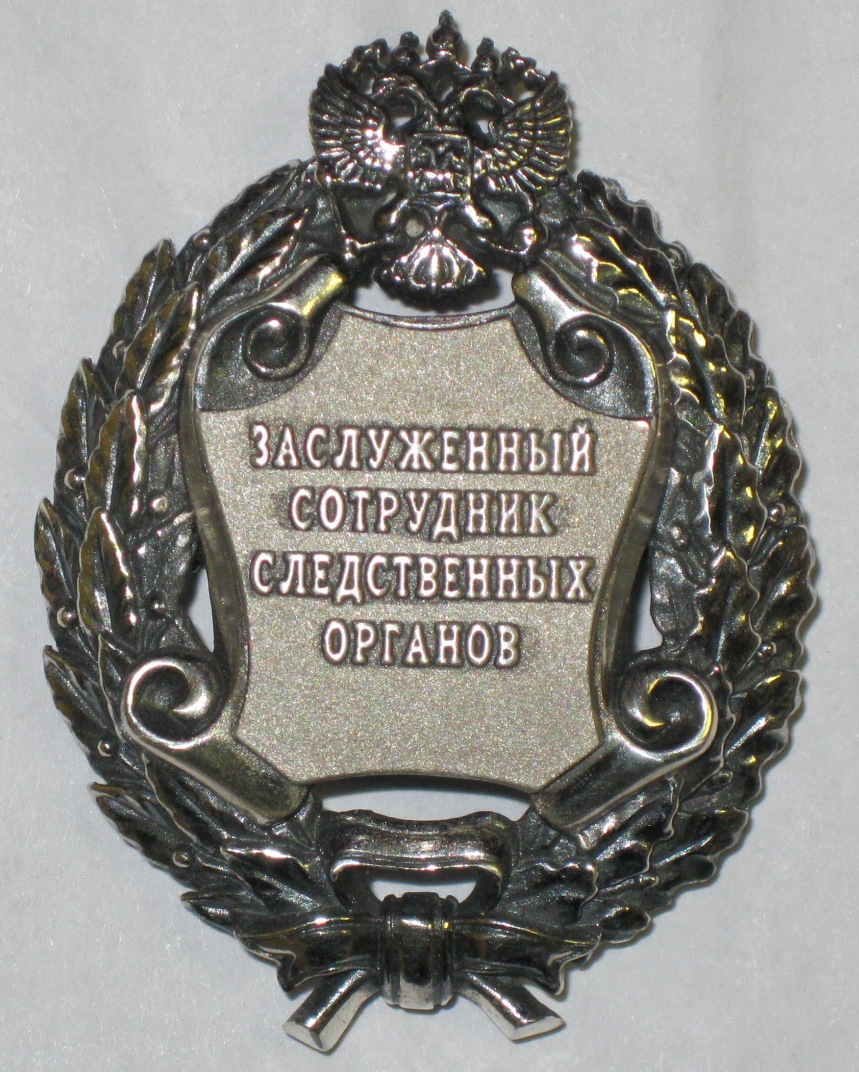
Breast badge of Honoured Employee of Investigative Authorities of the Russian Federation

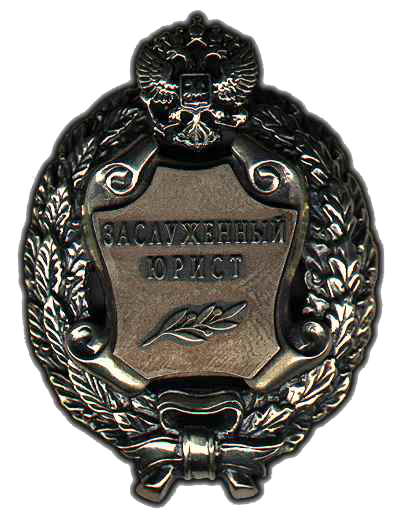
Breast badge of Honoured Lawyer of the Russian Federation

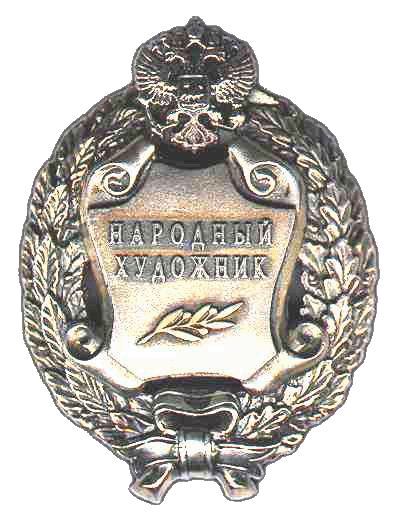
Breast badge of People's Artist of the Russian Federation

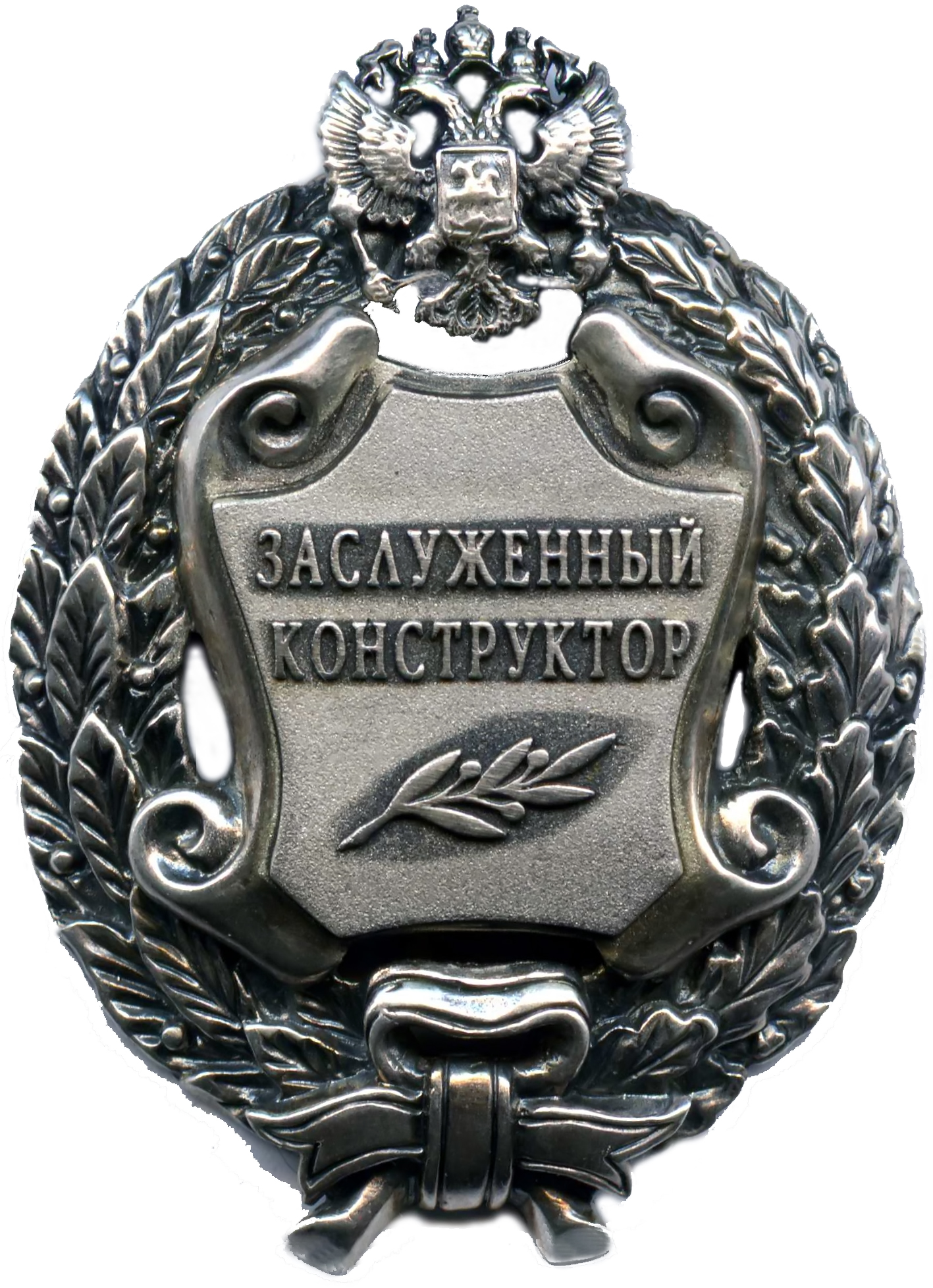
Breast badge of Honoured Builder of the Russian Federation

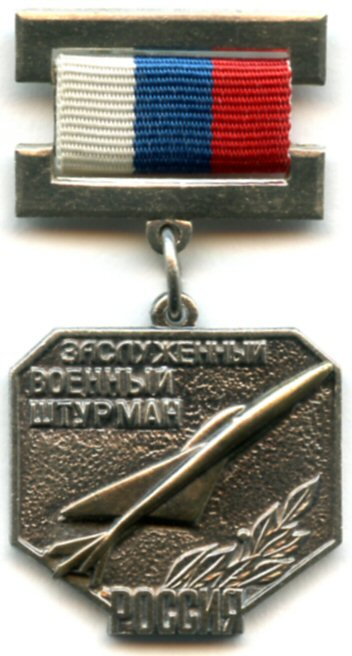
Breast badge of Honoured Military Navigator of the Russian Federation

Honorary titles of the Russian Federation (Russian: Почётные звания Российской Федерации) are titles given to citizens of the Russian Federation for professional and/or social achievements, but can be revoked by a vote in the State Duma. Rejection of honorary titles cannot be vetoed by the President. The word Russian: "Заслуженный" translates as "Honoured".

During the period of the Soviet Union, a system of professional honorary titles was created to be used across the USSR to recognize outstanding personal professional achievements. The awards were also used in some other Eastern bloc states and communist countries. Post-Soviet states modeled some of their awards on the Soviet award system.

On 30 December 1995, Russian president Boris Yeltsin signed Presidential Decree № 1341 on the establishment of the system of honorary titles of the Russian Federation. Prior to that, the legal acts referred to honorary titles of the RSFSR. Most of the Soviet awards have been retained in the Russian Federation.

== List of honorary titles ==
1. Hero of the Russian Federation
2. Hero of Labour of the Russian Federation
3. Mother Heroine
4. Pilot-Cosmonaut of the Russian Federation
5. Honoured Military Pilot of the Russian Federation
6. Honoured Military Navigator of the Russian Federation
7. People's Artist of the Russian Federation
8. Honoured Artist of the Russian Federation (Note: Rendered in Russian as артист, which refers broadly to performers and creators in the arts.)
9. Honoured Agronomist of the Russian Federation (abolished)
10. Honoured Architect of the Russian Federation
11. Honoured Veterinarian of the Russian Federation (abolished)
12. Honoured Military Specialist of the Russian Federation
13. Honoured Doctor of the Russian Federation
14. Honoured Geologist of the Russian Federation
15. Honoured Worker of the Arts Industry of the Russian Federation
16. Honoured Firefighter of the Russian Federation
17. Honoured Scholar of the Russian Federation
18. Honoured Land Surveyor of the Russian Federation
19. Honoured Livestock Specialist of the Russian Federation (abolished)
20. Honoured Inventor of the Russian Federation (abolished)
21. Honoured Builder of the Russian Federation
22. Honoured Forestry Specialist of the Russian Federation
23. Honoured Test Pilot of the Russian Federation
24. Honoured Master of Vocational Training of the Russian Federation
25. Honoured Engineer of the Russian Federation
26. Honoured Ameliorator the Russian Federation (abolished)
27. Honoured Metallurgist of the Russian Federation
28. Honoured Meteorologist Russian Federation
29. Honoured Metrologist of the Russian Federation (abolished)
30. Honoured Agricultural Engineer of the Russian Federation (abolished)
31. Honoured Pilot of the Russian Federation
32. Honoured Worker of Public Services of the Russian Federation (abolished)
33. Honoured Worker of Geodesy and Cartography of the Russian Federation
34. Honoured Worker of Housing and Communal Services of the Russian Federation
35. Honoured Worker of Health Services of the Russian Federation
36. Honoured Worker of Culture of the Russian Federation
37. Honoured Worker of the Forest Industry of the Russian Federation
38. Honoured Worker of the Oil and Gas Industry of the Russian Federation
39. Honoured Worker of the Food Industry of the Russian Federation
40. Honoured Worker of Fisheries of the Russian Federation
41. Honoured Worker of Communications of the Russian Federation
42. Honoured Worker of Agriculture of the Russian Federation
43. Honoured Worker of Social Services of the Russian Federation
44. Honoured Worker of the Textile and Light Industries of the Russian Federation
45. Honoured Worker of the Trade Industry of the Russian Federation (abolished)
46. Honoured Worker of the Transport Industry of the Russian Federation
47. Honoured Worker of Physical Culture of the Russian Federation
48. Honoured Innovator of the Russian Federation (abolished)
49. Honoured Rescuer of the Russian Federation
50. Honoured Builder of the Russian Federation
51. Honoured Teacher of the Russian Federation
52. Honoured Chemist of the Russian Federation
53. Honoured Artist of the Russian Federation (Note: Rendered in Russian as художник, which refers primarily to visual artists.)
54. Honoured Miner of the Russian Federation
55. Honoured Navigator of the Russian Federation
56. Honoured Test Navigator of the Russian Federation
57. Honoured Ecologist of the Russian Federation
58. Honoured Economist of the Russian Federation
59. Honoured Engineer of the Power Industry of the Russian Federation
60. Honoured Lawyer of the Russian Federation
61. Honoured Worker of Higher Education of the Russian Federation
62. Honoured Border Guard of the Russian Federation (abolished)
63. Honoured Officer of the Foreign Intelligence Service of the Russian Federation
64. Honoured Officer of federal Security Organs of the Russian Federation
65. Honoured Member of the Diplomatic Service of the Russian Federation
66. Honoured Officer of the Interior Ministry of the Russian Federation
67. People's Architect of the Russian Federation
68. People's Teacher of the Russian Federation
69. People's Architect of the Russian Federation
70. Honoured Worker of the Rocket and Space Industry of the Russian Federation
71. Honoured Customs Officer of the Russian Federation
72. Honoured Employee of State Security Organs of the Russian Federation
73. Honoured Worker of the Prosecutor's Office of the Russian Federation
74. Honoured Employee of Drug Control Authorities of the Russian Federation
75. Honoured Inventor of the Russian Federation
76. Honoured Employee of the Investigative Authorities of the Russian Federation
77. Honoured Worker of the Nuclear Industry of the Russian Federation

== See also ==
- Awards and decorations of the Russian Federation
- Awards and Emblems of the Ministry of Defense of the Russian Federation
- Awards of the Federal Protective Service of the Russian Federation
- Awards of the Federal Security Service of the Russian Federation
- Awards of the Ministry for Emergency Situations of Russia
- Awards of the Ministry of Internal Affairs of Russia
- List of awards of independent services of the Russian Federation
- List of Heroes of the Russian Federation (K)

== Sources ==
- The Russian Gazette (in Russian)
- Site of the President of the Russian Federation (in English)
- The Commission on State Awards to the President of the Russian Federation (in Russian)
