= Awards of the Ministry for Emergency Situations of Russia =

Known internationally as EMERCOM, Russia's Ministry for Civil Defence, Emergency Situations and Disaster Relief is composed of both military and civilian personnel. It encompasses land, naval and air assets, the State Fire Service, rescue teams and its own academies. This article is dedicated to the award system of this ministry of the Russian Federation. EMERCOM awards are subordinate to state awards. All awards herein were approved by orders of the Minister of Emergency Situations, these order numbers and inception dates are included as quick references to facilitate any further research.

== Ministry of the Russian Federation for Affairs of Civil Defence, Emergencies and Disaster Relief (EMERCOM) ==
=== Medals ===
Award	Name (English/Russian)	Ministerial Order	Inception Date	Award Criteria
	Cross "For valour" Крест «За доблесть»	No. 426 -- No. 620 -- No. 372 -- No. 689	2005-05-30 --- 2010-12-06 --- 2012-06-28 --- 2014-12-08	Awarded to members of the staff of the Ministry of Emergency Situations of Russia with work (service) experience in the Ministry of Emergency Situations of Russia (including in the services, agencies, institutions and organizations, transferred to the Ministry of Emergency Situations of Russia) of not less than 10 years, who were previously honoured with decorations of EMERCOM of Russia, for courage and bravery displayed in extreme situations, in saving lives and property. A 10,000 rouble monetary reward accompanies the cross.
	Medal "For distinction in eliminating the effects of emergency situations" Медаль «За отличие в ликвидации последствий чрезвычайной ситуации»	No. 552 -- No. 620 -- No. 372 -- No. 689	2005-07-18 --- 2010-12-06 --- 2012-06-28 --- 2014-12-08	Awarded to the most distinguished members of the staff of the Ministry of Emergency Situations of Russia, and in some cases, to other citizens for courage and dedication in conditions involving the risk of life, for skilful and decisive actions and initiative contributing to the successful implementation of measures to eliminate the consequences of emergencies, save lives and protect property; for the successful management of the actions of subordinates in carrying out tasks in the aftermath of an emergency. A 3,000 rouble monetary reward accompanies the medal.
	Medal "For courage in a fire" Медаль «За отвагу на пожаре»	No. 570 -- No. 620 -- No. 372 -- No. 689	2002-12-06 --- 2010-12-06 --- 2012-06-28 --- 2014-12-08	Awarded to the most distinguished members of the staff of the Ministry of Emergency Situations of Russia, and in some cases, to other citizens for courage and dedication in conditions involving the risk of life, in extinguishing fires, during the rescue of persons and the protection of property from fire; For the successful management of the actions of subordinates extinguishing fires and rescuing persons; for skilful and resolute actions and high professional skills in the prevention of an explosion or fire. A 5,000 rouble monetary reward accompanies the medal.
	Medal "For mine clearing" Медаль «За Разминирование»	No. 550 -- No. 620 -- No. 372 -- No. 689	2005-07-18 --- 2010-12-06 --- 2012-06-28 --- 2014-12-08	Awarded to the most distinguished members of the staff of the Ministry of Emergency Situations of Russia, and in some cases, to other citizens for courage and dedication in conditions involving the risk of life, when performing tasks for the detection and neutralization (destruction) of explosive devices on the ground; for participation in international programs or projects concerning mine-clearance operations; for organizing and directing explosive disposal operations. A 5,000 rouble monetary reward accompanies the medal.
	Medal "For the salvation of the drowning" Медаль «За спасение погибающих на водах»	No. 620 -- No. 372 -- No. 689	2010-12-06 --- 2012-06-28 --- 2014-12-08	Awarded to the most distinguished staff of the Ministry of Emergency Situations of Russia, and in some cases, to other citizens, for displaying courage, bravery and self-sacrifice in rescuing people from bodies of water; for the successful management of subordinates in the completion of a rescue from a body of water; for skilful and decisive actions and professional excellence in contributing to the prevention of accidents with people on bodies of water. A 3,000 rouble monetary reward accompanies the medal.
	Medal "For impeccable service" Медаль «За безупречную службу»	No. 628 -- No. 620 -- No. 372	2000-12-18 --- 2010-12-06 --- 2012-06-28	Awarded to personnel of the Ministry of Emergency Situations of Russia (including services, agencies, institutions and organizations transferred to the Ministry of Emergency Situations of Russia), with not less than 25 years of service and previously decorated for distinction by the Ministry of Emergency Situations of Russia (except for the medals "For distinguished military service" or “For distinguished service in the State Fire Service"), for excellent performance of professional duties, for a significant contribution to the development and improvement of the Ministry of Emergency Situations of Russia.
	Medal "For cooperation between rescue services" Медаль «За содружество во имя спасения»	No. 551 -- No. 620 -- No. 372	2005-07-18 --- 2010-12-06 --- 2012-06-28	Awarded to personnel of the Ministry of Emergency Situations of Russia, and to other citizens, for merit in strengthening the community of rescue services, for long-term and fruitful work in the field of civil defense, in the protection of populations and territories from emergency situations, from natural and man-made disasters, for ensuring fire prevention and water safety, for providing substantial assistance in the implementation of the goals and objectives of the Ministry of Emergency Situations of Russia.
	Medal "For the promotion of rescue matters" Медаль «За пропаганду спасательного дела»	No. 723 -- No. 372	2005-10-10 --- 2012-06-28	Awarded to soldiers, officers and employees of the Ministry of Emergency Situations of Russia, citizens who are actively engaged in promoting the activities of civil defence, protection of the population and territories from emergencies, disseminating best response practices when faced with accidents and disasters.
	Medal "15 years of the MES of Russia" Медаль «15 лет МЧС России»	No. 759 -- No. 372	2005-10-21 --- 2012-06-28	Awarded to Ministry personnel or to other citizens of the Russian Federation for outstanding achievements in the development and improvement of activities in the field of Civil Defence, Civil Protection, and territories from emergencies, fire safety and water safety.
	Medal "20 years of the MES of Russia" Медаль «20 лет МЧС России»	No. 620 -- No. 372	2010-12-06 --- 2012-06-28	Awarded to personnel of the Ministry for Emergency Situations of Russia for work of the highest quality, efficient and flawless execution of their professional duties, for significant contributions to the development and improvement of the Ministry for Emergency Situations of Russia, with seniority of work (service) in the Ministry (including the departments, services, agencies, institutions and organizations referred to in Emergency management of Russia) of at least 10 years; to other citizens of the Russian Federation for outstanding achievements in manufacturing, research, social, cultural and other fields, the introduction of which into the activities of Russian Emergencies Ministry has allowed to significantly improve the protection of the population in the area of civil protection, prevention and emergency management, fire safety and water safety.
	Medal "25 years of the MES of Russia" Медаль «25 лет МЧС России»	No. 689	2014-12-08	Awarded to staff members of the Russian Ministry for Emergency Situations, with work experience (service) in the Ministry of Emergency Situations of Russia (including services, agencies, institutions and organizations, transferred to the Ministry of Emergency Situations of Russia) of not less than 10 years, as well as to other citizens, for their contribution to the creation, development and for ensuring of the successful functioning of the unified state system of prevention and liquidation of emergency situations, for long-term and impeccable service to the cause of the Russian Emergency Situations of Russia.
	Medal "For distinguished military service" 1st Class Медаль «За отличие в военной службе» I степени	No. 194 -- No. 620 -- No. 372	1996-03-27 --- 2010-12-06 --- 2012-06-28	Awarded to military personnel of the Ministry of Emergency Situations of Russia, (including members of the State Fire Service), serving a military contract in the Ministry of Emergency Situations of Russia, for conscientious service of 20 years.
	Medal "For distinguished military service" 2nd Class Медаль «За отличие в военной службе» II степени	No. 194 -- No. 620 -- No. 372	1996-03-27 --- 2010-12-06 --- 2012-06-28	Awarded to military personnel of the Ministry of Emergency Situations of Russia, (including members of the State Fire Service), serving a military contract in the Ministry of Emergency Situations of Russia, for conscientious service of 15 years.
	Medal "For distinguished military service" 3rd Class Медаль «За отличие в военной службе» III степени	No. 194 -- No. 620 -- No. 372	1996-03-27 --- 2010-12-06 --- 2012-06-28	Awarded to military personnel of the Ministry of Emergency Situations of Russia, (including members of the State Fire Service), serving a military contract in the Ministry of Emergency Situations of Russia, for conscientious service of 10 years.
	Medal "For distinguished service in the State Fire Service"; 1st Class Медаль «За отличие в службе Государственной Противопожарной Службы» I степени	No. 290 -- No. 620 -- No. 372	2005-04-06 --- 2010-12-06 --- 2012-06-28	Awarded to civilian personnel of the State Fire Service of the MES of Russia for 20 years of good service.
	Medal "For distinguished service in the State Fire Service"; 2nd Class Медаль «За отличие в службе Государственной Противопожарной Службы» II степени	No. 290 -- No. 620 -- No. 372	2005-04-06 --- 2010-12-06 --- 2012-06-28	Awarded to civilian personnel of the State Fire Service of the MES of Russia for 15 years of good service.
	Medal "For distinguished service in the State Fire Service"; 3rd Class Медаль «За отличие в службе Государственной Противопожарной Службы» III степени	No. 290 -- No. 620 -- No. 372	2005-04-06 --- 2010-12-06 --- 2012-06-28	Awarded to civilian personnel of the State Fire Service of the MES of Russia for 10 years of good service.
	Medal "For zeal" Медаль «За усердие»	No. 620 -- No. 372	2010-12-10 --- 2012-06-28	Awarded to personnel of the Russian Ministry for Emergency Situations serving/working in management of the unified state system of prevention and liquidation of emergency situations (RSHS), staff members of command and control centers and citizens of the Russian Federation, for diligence in managing government forces and RSHS, in training and providing development activities, for development of proposals for implementation of public policies aimed at prevention and emergency response, for significant contribution to the development of crisis management centers at all levels; in the effective exchange of operational information in emergency situations in Russia and abroad, for contributing to the establishment of the authority and prestige of the Russian Ministry for Emergency Situations at the international level.
	Decoration "For service in MES of Russia aviation" Знак Отличия «За службу в авиации МЧС РОССИИ»	No. 620 -- No. 372 -- No. 689	2010-12-06 --- 2012-06-28 --- 2014-12-08	Awarded to serving personnel and veterans of the aviation department of the Ministry of Emergency Situations of Russia with at least 10 years of service within the ministry, for significant contributions to the creation and development of aviation resources and procedures; can also be awarded to workers of the aviation industry, members of academic and research institutions and other persons assisting in the development of aviation and aerial support in rescue operations, for helping in solving the problems and carrying out the tasks faced by the Ministry of Emergency Situations of Russia.
	Medal "For fire prevention" Медаль «За предупреждение пожаров»	No. 620 -- No. 372	2010-12-06 --- 2012-06-28	Awarded to personnel of the Russian Ministry of Emergency Situations (including services, agencies, institutions and organizations attached to the ministry) with seniority of at least 10 years within the ministry, for the effective implementation of high quality regulations to prevent, predict and mitigate the effects of fires, and the implementation of special supervisory and control functions on matters within the competence of the Ministry of Emergency Situations of Russia, and to other citizens for outstanding contribution to the development and improvement of preventive measures in the field of fire safety.
	Medal "For special contribution to the fire safety of critical state facilities" Медаль «За особый вклад в обеспечение пожарной безопасности особо важных государственных объектов»	No. 620 -- No. 372 -- No. 689	2010-12-06 --- 2012-06-28 --- 2014-12-08	Awarded to personnel of the Ministry for Emergency Situations of Russia and other Russian citizens for long and fruitful activity in the prevention and suppression of fires in critical state facilities. Original Order number and date are unknown, the 2010 Order is a revision of this award.
	Medal "200 years of professional fire protection in Moscow" Медаль «200 лет профессиональной пожарной охране Москвы»	No. 620 -- No. 372	2010-12-06 --- 2012-06-28	Awarded to staff members of the Main Directorate for Emergency Management of Russia in Moscow, with a length of service (work) in the Ministry of Emergency Situations of Russia (including the departments, services, agencies, institutions and organizations transferred to the Ministry of Emergency Situations of Russia) of at least 15 years; to Ministry personnel, who served with distinction in units of the First Department of the State Fire Service and its management apparatus for 15 years or more; to former employees and employees of the State Fire Service or of the military, who have served perfectly (worked) for 15 years or more in units of the Interior Ministry or the Ministry for Emergency Situations of Russia, who were stationed in Moscow, transferred to the reserve (retirement) or pensioned due to age or not having served the required number of years of service but are receiving a disability pension; to citizens who have made a significant contribution to strengthening fire safety issues in the city of Moscow, in the development and improvement of logistics, training of professional personnel for the fire service departments. Original Order number and date are unknown, the 2010 Order is a revision of this medal first awarded in 2004.
	Commemorative Medal "Marshal Vasily Chuikov" Памятная Медаль «Маршал Василий Чуйков»	No. 620 -- No. 372	2010-12-06 --- 2012-06-28	Awarded to personnel of the Russian Ministry of Emergency Situations (including services, agencies, institutions and organizations attached to the ministry), and to other citizens, for many years of impeccable service to the cause of civil defence, for improving management, communications and the civil defence alarm system, for maintaining a high degree of preparedness.
	Commemorative Medal "75 years of civil defence" Памятная Медаль «75 лет гражданской обороне»	No. 464 -- No. 620 -- No. 372	2007-08-24 --- 2010-12-06 --- 2012-06-28	Awarded to military and civilian personnel of the Russian Ministry for Emergency Situations, as well as citizens of the Russian Federation for merit and personal contribution to the development and improvement of activities in the field of Civil Defence, Civil Protection, and territories from emergencies, fire safety and water safety.
	Commemorative Medal "100 years of the St. Petersburg University of the SFS of the MES of Russia" Памятная Медаль «100 лет Санкт-Петербургскому университету ГПС МЧС России»	No. 383 -- No. 620 -- No. 372	2006-06-27 --- 2010-12-06 --- 2012-06-28	Awarded to soldiers, officers and employees of the St. Petersburg University for the State Fire Service of the MES of Russia, for proficiency during more than 10 years in the State Fire Service of the MES of Russia, to soldiers, officers and employees of the SFS of the MES of Russia, as well as veterans of the university who made a significant contribution to the development of the St. Petersburg University for the State Fire Service of the MES of Russia.
	Commemorative Medal "50 years of the civil defence magazine" Памятная Медаль «50 лет журналу гражданская защита»	No. 493 -- No. 620 -- No. 372	2006-08-24 --- 2010-12-06 --- 2012-06-28	Awarded to military and civilian personnel who have served (worked) flawlessly in the “Civil Defense” magazine and transferred to the reserves or retired, or receiving a disability pension from the time of service (work); to soldiers, officers and civilian staff of the Ministry of Emergency Situations of Russia and other federal executive bodies concerned with promoting knowledge concerning Civil Defence, emergencies and the elimination of consequences of natural disasters.
	Medal "Participant in emergency humanitarian operations" Медаль «Участнику чрезвычайных гуманитарных операций»	No. 885 -- No. 620 -- No. 372	1995-12-27 --- 2010-12-06 --- 2012-06-28	Awarded to individuals or organisations for their involvement in humanitarian relief operations and contributions to the organization of such future actions as well as for dedication and courage.
	Medal "Participant in suppressing the fires of 2010" Медаль «Участнику ликвидации пожаров 2010 года»	No. 620 -- No. 372	2010-12-06 --- 2012-06-28	For active participation, as well as for bold and decisive actions displayed in the fight against the fires of 2010.

=== Decorations ===
Award	Name (English/Russian)	Ministerial Order	Inception Date	Award Criteria
	Breast badge "Honoured Fellow of the MES of Russia" Нагрудный знак «Почетный сотрудник МЧС России»	No. 620 -- No. 372 -- No. 689	2010.12.06 -- 2012-06-28 -- 2014.12.08	Awarded to personnel of the Ministry of Emergency Situations of Russia with service (work) experience in the Ministry (including in the services, agencies, institutions and organizations, transferred to the Ministry of Emergency Situations of Russia) of not less than 20 years and previously awarded state awards of the Russian Federation or ministerial decorations of EMERCOM of Russia. For critical work in the implementation of state policy in the field of civil defense, protection of the population and territories from emergency situations and natural and man-made disasters, fire safety and water safety, including contribution to the creation, development and successful implementation of a unified state system of prevention and liquidation of emergency situations, as well as for long and faultless service in the Ministry of Emergency Situations of Russia. In exceptional cases, may be awarded to other citizens who have made significant contributions to the development and successful operation of a unified state system of prevention and liquidation of emergency situations, for improving activities in the field of civil defense, fire safety and water safety. A 15,000 rouble monetary prize comes with the award. Recipients of the decoration should serve as an example of exemplary performance of official duties, culture, good conduct and personal modesty.
	Breast badge "Honour Decoration of the MES of Russia" Нагрудный знак «Почетный знак МЧС России»	No. 200 -- No. 372	1998-03-25 -- 2012-06-28	Awarded to employees with at least 5 years of service with the MES (EMERCOM) of Russia and that have been previously awarded one of the badges of merit of the MES of Russia; for merit in initiatives, development and implementation of successful rescue management methods resulting in successful operations, excellent performance in preventing and alleviating the consequences of accidents and natural disasters, for long and impeccable service in the cause of civil defence and disaster management.
	Breast badge "Participant in disaster relief management" Нагрудный знак «Участнику ликвидации последствий ЧС»	No. 200 -- No. 620 -- No. 372	1998-03-25 -- 2010.12.06 -- 2012-06-28	Awarded to personnel of the Ministry of Emergency Situations of Russia or to other contracted citizens to conduct rescue operations that were directly involved in the management of disaster relief at the territorial, regional, federal or international level; for active, effective and selfless rescue actions and elimination of consequences of accidents, catastrophes and natural disasters.
	Breast badge "For merit" Нагрудный Знак «За заслуги»	No. 200 -- No. 620 -- No. 372	1998-03-25 -- 2010.12.06 -- 2012-06-28	Awarded to personnel of the Russian Ministry of Emergency Situations with service or work experience in EMERCOM of Russia (including in services, agencies, institutions and organizations, attached or transferred to the Ministry of Emergency Situations of Russia) of at least two years for diligence, effectiveness and work of the highest quality in official duties and operational tasks; may also be awarded to citizens who have made significant contributions to the development and successful operation of a unified state system of prevention and liquidation of emergency situations, for perfecting activities in the field of civil defense, fire safety and water safety.
	Breast badge "For distinction" Нагрудный Знак «За отличие»	No. 620 -- No. 372	2010.12.06 -- 2012-06-28	Awarded to staff members of the Ministry of Emergency Situations of Russia, who are part of the daily management of the unified state system of prevention and liquidation of emergency situations, the staff of situation centers and command and control centers of public authorities, and to citizens, for exemplary performance of official duties in carrying out activities to prevent and respond to emergencies, for a significant contribution to the organization and development of interagency cooperation and active participation in activities for the effective exchange of operational information for the prevention and elimination of emergency situations on the territory of the Russian Federation and abroad.
	Breast badge "Superior worker in fire prevention" Нагрудный знак «Лучший работник пожарной охраны»	No. 608 -- No. 620 -- No. 372	2005-08-03 -- 2010.12.06 -- 2012-06-28	Awarded to soldiers and members of the State Fire Service of Russia who have worked with EMERCOM for at least 5 years, for dedication and exemplary work in fire fighting, during natural disasters, in saving lives and protecting public property, in actively promoting fire safety, for high achievements in developing and putting into application advanced technologies used to fight fires; for active assistance of the State Fire Service.
	Breast badge "Superior inspector of the State Fire Control of the MES of Russia" Нагрудный знак «Лучший инспектор ГПН МЧС России»	No. 242 -- No. 620 -- No. 372	2006-04-14 -- 2010.12.06 -- 2012-06-28	Awarded to officials of the State Fire Service Directorate of the Central Command of the EMERCOM of Russia for managerial improvements in the implementation of the Central Command and for fruitful work in fire prevention and safety of human habitations and economic facilities; for efficiency while carrying out monitoring for compliance with the requirements of legislative and other normative legal acts of the Russian Federation, normative legal acts of the Russian Ministry of Emergency Situations in the field of fire prevention and in the reduction of violations.
	Breast badge "Veteran of the MES of Russia" Нагрудный знак «Ветеран МЧС России»	No. 620 -- No. 372	2010-12-06 --- 2012-06-28	Awarded to members of veterans organizations of the Russian Ministry of Emergency Situations (including services, agencies, institutions and organizations attached to the ministry), with at least 10 years of service within the ministry and awarded a state or departmental award in the past 20 years, for active involvement in the promotion of civil defence, in the protection of the people and territories from emergency situations; for the dissemination of best practices and knowledge of actions in the aftermath of accidents and natural disasters; for significant personal contribution to solving the problems faced by veterans organizations of the MES of Russia; for the promotion and development of the veterans' movement.
	Breast badge "Veteran aviator of the MES of Russia" Нагрудный знак «Ветеран авиации МЧС России»	No. 236 -- No. 620 -- No. 372	2002-05-14 -- 2010.12.06 --- 2012-06-28	Awarded to deserving military and civilian personnel of the EMERCOM aviation department for excellent performance of duties, if previously awarded state or departmental awards and that have served in the EMERCOM of Russia for at least 10 years.
	Breast badge "Excellent member of a military rescue unit" Нагрудный знак «Отличник спасательных воинских формирований»	No. 620 -- No. 372	2010-12-06 --- 2012-06-28	Awarded to military personnel serving in military rescue units of the Russian Ministry of Emergency Situations, for the achievement of high performance in combat training, for enhancing their professional qualifications, for courage, resourcefulness and initiative in the line of duty, for displaying high military discipline.
	Breast badge "Excellent firefighter" Нагрудный знак «Отличный пожарный»	No. 608 -- No. 620 -- No. 372	2005-08-03 -- 2010.12.06 --- 2012-06-28	Awarded to military personnel and employees of the State Fire Service of the Ministry of Emergency Situations of Russia, who have worked in the MES of Russia for at least 3 years and in some instances - other citizens of Russia, for high performance in service in the prevention and extinguishing of fires, for displaying courage, determination and professionalism.
	Breast badge "Excellent employee of the GIMS of the MES of Russia" Нагрудный знак «Отличник ГИМС МЧС России»	No. 982 -- No. 620 -- No. 372	2005-12-19 -- 2010.12.06 --- 2012-06-28	Awarded to state inspectors for professionalism and high levels achieved in the implementation of state and technical supervision of small boats and bases (facilities) for their sites and their use of the internal water ways and territorial waters of the Russian Federation; for efficiency and quality output in the monitoring of compliance with the requirements of legislative and other normative legal acts of the Russian Federation, normative legal acts of the Russian Ministry of Emergency Situations in the field of safety on bodies of water.
	Breast badge "Distinguished aviator" Нагрудный знак «Отличник авиации»	No. 236 -- No. 620 -- No. 372	2002-05-14 -- 2010.12.06 --- 2012-06-28	Awarded to military and civilian aviation personnel of EMERCOM for outstanding performance of their assigned duties whether in flying, logistics or engineering operations. A helicopter or jet transport device is worn on the ribbon.
	Breast badge "Excellent civil defense troops" Нагрудный знак «Отличник войск гражданской обороны»	No. 608 -- No. 372	2005-08-03 --- 2012-06-28	Awarded to military members of civil defense forces with at least 2 years experience in the service, who have achieved high performance in combat training, improved their professional qualifications, for courage, resourcefulness and initiative in the line of duty, and displayed military discipline.
	Breast Badge "International class rescuer" Нагрудный знак «Спасатель международный класс»	No. 672	2006-11-17	Award based on the decision of the relevant committee on certification of the emergency services, rescue groups or the federal executive authority on rescues or the executive authority of the member.
	Breast Badge "Rescuer first class" Нагрудный знак «Спасатель первый класс»	No. 672	2006-11-17	Award based on the decision of the relevant committee on certification of the emergency services, rescue groups or the federal executive authority on rescues or the executive authority of the member.
	Breast Badge "Rescuer second class" Нагрудный знак «Спасатель второй класс»	No. 672	2006-11-17	Award based on the decision of the relevant committee on certification of the emergency services, rescue groups or the federal executive authority on rescues or the executive authority of the member.
	Breast Badge "Rescuer third class" Нагрудный знак «Спасатель третий класс»	No. 672	2006-11-17	Award based on the decision of the relevant committee on certification of the emergency services, rescue groups or the federal executive authority on rescues or the executive authority of the member.
	Breast badge "For scientific and technological development" Нагрудный знак «Лауреат премии МЧС России за научные и технические разработки»	No. 267	1997-05-16	Awarded with other prizes of the Russian Ministry of Emergency Situations, for scientific and technical studies, for significant contribution to improving the level and efficiency of economic activities to regulate safety in emergency situations; for the development and implementation of production of new equipment in the field of management and information systems for carrying out rescue operations, systems and livelihoods, intelligence, monitoring, forecasting and search, whose performance is at the level of the best domestic and foreign counterparts; for development and adoption of new technologies, methods of prevention, protection of the population and territories from emergency situations; for the development of the legal framework of a unified state system of prevention and liquidation of emergency situations.

=== Departmental Medals ===
Award	Name (English/Russian)	Ministerial Order	Inception Date	Award Criteria
	Medal "50 years of the Central Command of the MES of Russia" Медаль «50 лет Центрального командного пункта (ЦКП) МЧС России»		2005	
	Medal "360 years of fire protection in Russia" Медаль «360 лет пожарной охране России»		2009	Departmental award of the General Directorate Of The Moscow Region.
	Medal "20 years of the MES' Central Base 3225" Медаль «20 лет 3225 Центральная База МТС МЧС России»		2009	Departmental medal of EMERCOM denoting 20 Years of EMERCOM's main logistical base (base 3225), 1989 - 2009.
	Medal "80 years of the MES' Ural institute of the State Fire Service" Медаль «80 лет Уральский институт ПГС МЧС России»		2009	Departmental medal of the Ural Institute of the State Fire Service of Russia.
	Medal "15 years of emergency rescue services in the Pskov region" Медаль «15 лет Аварийно-спасательная служба МЧС Псковской области»		2011	Departmental medal of the Ministry for Emergency Situations of the Pskov region 1996 - 2011.
	Medal "For merit and contribution" 1st class Медаль «За заслуги и вклад» I степени			Departmental award of the Civil Defence Academy
	Medal "For merit and contribution" 2nd class Медаль «За заслуги и вклад» II степени			Departmental award of the Civil Defence Academy
	Medal "For merit and contribution" 3rd class Медаль «За заслуги и вклад» III степени			Departmental award of the Civil Defence Academy
	Medal "Participant in the victory parade in Red Square" Медаль «Участник парада победы на Красной Площади»		2010	Departmental award of the Civil Defence Academy
	Medal "10 Years of the Diving Service of EMERCOM of Russia" Медаль «10 лет водолазной службе МЧС России»		2006	Departmental award.
	Medal "15 Years of the Diving Service of EMERCOM of Russia" Медаль «15 лет водолазной службе МЧС России»		2011	Departmental award.

=== Emblems ===
Branch/Department	Emblem	Branch/Department	Emblem
Flag of Emercom		Emblem of Emercom	
Uniform patch Emercom of Russia		Uniform patch Rescuer	
Uniform patch Emercom Aviation		Uniform patch Civil Defence Academy	
Uniform patch State Fire Service		Uniform patch Paramilitary Rescue Units	
Uniform patch National Center for Crisis Management		Uniform patch Operational Center for the GIMS	
Uniform patch Special Purpose Underwater Rescue Service		Uniform patch Search Dog Service	
Uniform patch Centre for Emergency Psychological Aid		Uniform patch Central Air Base of EMERCOM	

== See also ==
- Emercom
- Awards and decorations of the Russian Federation
- List of awards of independent services of the Russian Federation
- Ministerial awards of the Russian Federation
- Honorary titles of the Russian Federation
- Awards and decorations of the Soviet Union
