= Medal "For Bravery in Firefighting" =

Medal "For Bravery in Fire Fighting"
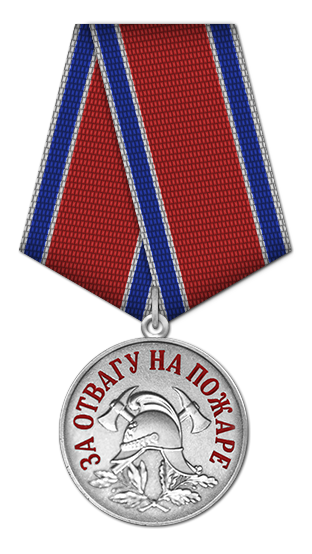
- Obverse of the Medal "For Bravery in Fire Fighting"
- Type: Order
- Presented by: Russia (2018–present)
- Eligibility: Citizens of Russia
- Status: Being awarded
- Established: 15 September 2018
- Ribbon for the Medal "For Bravery in Fire Fighting"

Precedence
- Next (higher): Medal "For Distinction in the Protection of the State Borders"
- Next (lower): Medal "For Life Saving"

Medal "For Bravery in Firefighting" (Russian: Медаль «За отвагу на пожаре») is a state award of the Russian Federation. Established by Decree of the President of the Russian Federation dated September 15, 2018 No. 519 “On the establishment of the medal "For Courage in Fire" and the establishment of the honorary title "Honored Firefighter of the Russian Federation".

== History ==
By the Decree of the Presidium of the Supreme Soviet issued on October 31, 1957, the Medal "For Courage in a Fire" was established to reward fire workers, members of voluntary fire brigades, military personnel and other citizens who distinguished themselves in extinguishing fires, saving people, socialist property and property of citizens from fire.

On December 25, 1991, according to the law adopted by the Supreme Soviet of the RSFSR the RSFSR was renamed the Russian Federation. On December 26, 1991, the USSR ceased to exist, Russia emerged from it as an independent state. On April 21, 1992, the Congress of People's Deputies of Russia approved the renaming, making appropriate amendments to the Constitution of the RSFSR, which came into force on May 16, 1992, from the moment of publication. By Decree of the Presidium of the Supreme Soviet of Russia of March 2, 1992 No. 2424-1, before the adoption of the law on state awards, some insignia that existed in the USSR were retained in the award system of Russia, including the medal "For Courage in a Fire".

The new award system, approved by Decree of the President of the Russian Federation of March 2, 1994 No. 442 "On State Awards of the Russian Federation" did not include the medal “For Courage in a Fire”, however, similar medals were established by the Ministry of Internal Affairs of Russia and the Ministry of Emergency Situations of Russia in 2001 year and 2002, respectively.

By Decree of the President of the Russian Federation of September 15, 2018 No. 519 “On the establishment of the medal “For Courage in Fire” and the establishment of the honorary title “Honored Worker of the Fire Department of the Russian Federation,” the medal was returned to the award system of the Russian Federation.
