= List of awards of independent services of the Russian Federation =

This article features the awards of non-ministerial and independent services of the Russian Federation.

== Foreign Intelligence Service ==

=== Medals ===
Award	Name (English/Russian)	Order	Inception date	Criteria
	Medal "For Distinction" Медаль «За отличие»	No. ?	April 2005	Awarded to members of the Russian Foreign Intelligence Service for concrete results and operational performance.
	Medal "For Merit" Медаль «За заслуги»	No. 20	17 April 2002	Awarded to military and civilian personnel of the Foreign Intelligence Service of Russia who have made significant contributions to the organisation and implementation of intelligence activities; to persons that have made a substantial contribution to the Foreign Intelligence Service of Russia in ensuring the national interests of Russia.
	Medal "For Interaction" Медаль «За взаимоде́йствие»	No. ?	November 2004	Awarded to persons who made a substantial contribution to the Foreign Intelligence Service of Russia.
	Medal "For Labour Distinction" Медаль «За трудовое отличие»	No. ?	19 April 2005	Awarded to civilian personnel of the FIS of Russia for high work ratings and a conscientious attitude towards their tasks with work experience in the service of not less than 15 years.
	Medal "Veteran of the Foreign Intelligence Service" Медаль «Ветеран Службы внешней разведки»	No. ?	March 2004	Awarded to soldiers of the Russian Foreign Intelligence Service for 25 years of faithful service, a minimum of 10 of those years must have been in the foreign intelligence sector in the KGB or FIS.
	Medal "For Distinction In Military Service"; 1st Class Медаль «За Отличие В Военной Службе» I степени	No. ?	14 November 1995	Awarded to military personnel of the Foreign Intelligence Service of the Russian Federation for 20 years of good service. Inscription on reverse "СЛУЖБА ВНЕШНЕЙ РАЗВЕДКИ РОССИЙСКОЙ ФЕДЕРАЦИИ" (FOREIGN INTELLIGENCE SERVICE RUSSIAN FEDERATION).
	Medal "For Distinction In Military Service"; 2nd Class Медаль «За Отличие В Военной Службе» II степени	No. ?	14 November 1995	Awarded to military personnel of the Foreign Intelligence Service of the Russian Federation for 15 years of good service. Inscription on reverse "СЛУЖБА ВНЕШНЕЙ РАЗВЕДКИ РОССИЙСКОЙ ФЕДЕРАЦИИ" (FOREIGN INTELLIGENCE SERVICE RUSSIAN FEDERATION).
	Medal "For Distinction In Military Service"; 3rd Class Медаль «За Отличие В Военной Службе» III степени	No. ?	14 November 1995	Awarded to military personnel of the Foreign Intelligence Service of the Russian Federation for 10 years of good service. Inscription on reverse "СЛУЖБА ВНЕШНЕЙ РАЗВЕДКИ РОССИЙСКОЙ ФЕДЕРАЦИИ" (FOREIGN INTELLIGENCE SERVICE RUSSIAN FEDERATION).

=== Decorations ===
Award	Name (English/Russian)	Order	Inception date	Criteria
	Decoration "For Service in Intelligence" Почетный знак «За службу в разведке»	No. ?	14 July 1990	Initially awarded to the most outstanding members of the First Chief Directorate of the KGB of the USSR, retained post-1991 by the newly formed Foreign Intelligence Service of Russia. First awarded on the occasion of the 70th anniversary of the Soviet foreign intelligence service. The award includes many socio-economical rewards and advantages.
	Prize of the SVR of Russia Премия СВР России	No. ?	6 January 2000	Established in order to strengthen cooperation between the Russian SVR and creative organizations and cultural figures, as well as to promote the creation of highly artistic works of literature and art based on the Russian Foreign Intelligence Service.Three prizes are awarded each year to authors (group of authors) of the best works in the field of literature, visual arts, television and journalism, devoted to the activities of the Russian Foreign Intelligence Service and its employees.
	Breast badge "For Scientific Achievements" Нагрудный знак «За научные достижения»	No. ?	September 2002	Awarded to members of the Service who have made a significant contribution to the scientific support of the Foreign Intelligence Service of Russia.
	Jubilee badge "75 years of INO-PGU-SVR" Юбилейный знак «75 лет ИНО-ПГУ-СВР»	No. ?	April 1995	Awarded to distinguished military personnel of the Foreign Intelligence Service of Russia, as well as to Foreign Intelligence Service veterans, in reserves or retired, for assistance to the Foreign Intelligence Service of Russia.
	Jubilee badge "80 years of INO-PGU-SVR" Юбилейный знак «80 лет ИНО-ПГУ-СВР»	No. ?	April 2000	Awarded to distinguished military and civilian personnel of the Foreign Intelligence Service of Russia with at least 15 years of service, for concrete results, for distinction in operational and performance management; as well as to Foreign Intelligence Service veterans, in reserves (or retired), for concrete contributions to the activities of units of the Foreign Intelligence Service.
	Jubilee badge "85 years of INO-PGU-SVR" Юбилейный знак «85 лет ИНО-ПГУ-СВР»	No. ?	April 2005	Awarded to distinguished military and civilian personnel of the Foreign Intelligence Service of Russia with at least 15 years of service.
	Jubilee badge "90 years of INO-PGU-SVR" Юбилейный знак «90 лет ИНО-ПГУ-СВР»	No. ?	April 2010	Order not yet found for translation to this article.
	Jubilee badge "95 years of INO-PGU-SVR" Юбилейный знак «95 лет ИНО-ПГУ-СВР»	No. ?	April 2015	Order not yet found for translation to this article.

== Main Directorate of Special Programs of the President of the Russian Federation ==
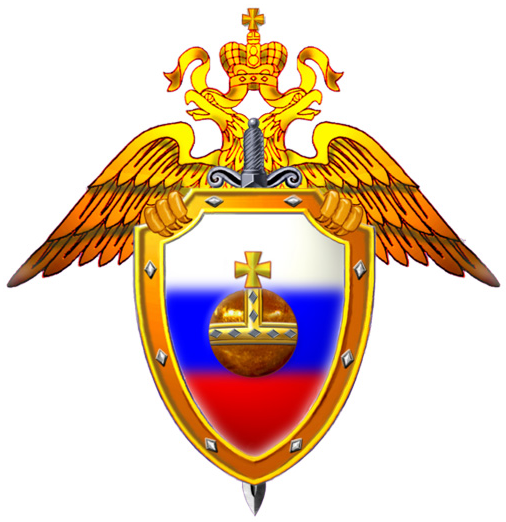

=== Medals ===
Award	Name (English/Russian)	Order	Inception date	Criteria
	Medal "For Merit" Медаль «За заслуги»	No. 7	24 February 2016	Awarded to GUSP staff, members of the civilian personnel of the Service of Special Facilities under the President of the Russian Federation, employees of organizations established to fulfill the tasks assigned to the GUSP, workers of mobilization bodies of federal bodies of state power, public authorities of the subjects of the Russian Federation, local self-government bodies, other state bodies and organizations, previously awarded GUSP awards: for merit in work (service) and long-term work (service) of at least 15 years in the sphere of activity of the Main Directorate for Special Programs of the President of the Russian Federation (GUSP). Award of this medal is a prerequisite for the award of the Medal "Veteran of Labor".
	Medal "For assistance in implementing special programs" Медаль «За содействие в обеспечении специальных программ»	No. 9 No. 7	31 April 2004 24 February 2016	Awarded to members of the GUSP staff or subordinate organisations, as well as other state bodies, organisations and institutions that have made a significant contribution to the implementation of special programs of the President of the Russian Federation.
	Medal "For Military Cooperation" Медаль «За Боевое Содружество»	No. 2-SP No. 7	12 February 2004 24 February 2016	Awarded to military and civilian personnel of the General Directorate of Special Programs of the President of the Russian Federation, and in some cases to ordinary citizens of Russia for merits in strengthening the brotherhood of arms and fostering military cooperation.
	Medal "For Labour Valour" Медаль «За трудовую доблесть»	No. 26-SP No. 7	28 December 2001 24 February 2016	Awarded to civilian personnel of the Directorate of Special Programmes of the President of the Russian Federation for concrete contributions to the tasks entrusted to the GUSP and for long and dedicated work.
	Medal "Veteran of the GUSP" медаль «Ветеран ГУСП»	No. 10 No. 7	16 April 2004 24 February 2016	Awarded to servicemen who transferred to the reserves (retired) and to civilian staff members of the GUSP and subordinate organisations who retired from or left the GUSP, and who faultlessly served in the GUSP for at least 20 years.
	Medal "Veteran of Service" медаль «Ветеран Службы»	No. 7-SP No. 7	2 June 2004 24 February 2016	Awarded to servicemen transferred (retired) to the reserves of the General Directorate of Special Programs of the President of the Russian Federation (hereinafter - GUSP), who served impeccably for 20 years or more; to persons discharged (retired) from military service in the reserves of the GUSP before the entry into force of this regulation, who served impeccably in the GUSP for 20 years or more; to civilian personnel dismissed (retired) from the GUSP who worked flawlessly in the GUSP for 20 years or more; to civilian personnel dismissed (retired) from the GUSP before the entry into force of this regulation who worked flawlessly in the GUSP for 20 years or more; may also be awarded by the Head of the GUSP to servicemen discharged from military service or retired to the reserves and persons discharged from military retired to the reserves of the GUSP before the entry into force of this regulation, who made a special contribution to the establishment, improvement and maintenance of the high degree of combat readiness of GUSP personnel, with less than 20 years in the GUSP, taking into account periods of military service in the Armed Forces of the Russian Federation, other troops, military formations and bodies. The 2016 order changed the ribbon from the previous paramilitary colours (left) to its present departmental specific colours (right).
	Medal "For Distinction In Military Service" 1st class Медаль «За отличие в военной службе» I степени	No. 25 No. 7	28 December 2001 24 February 2016	Awarded to military personnel of the Directorate of Special Programs of the President of the Russian Federation for 20 years of good service. Inscription on reverse "ПРИ ПРЕЗИДЕНТЕ РОССИИ" (UNDER THE PRESIDENT OF RUSSIA). The 2016 order changed the ribbon from the previous military colours (left) to its present departmental specific colours (right).
	Medal "For Distinction In Military Service" 2nd class Медаль «За отличие в военной службе» II степени	No. 25 No. 7	28 December 2001 24 February 2016	Awarded to military personnel of the Directorate of Special Programs of the President of the Russian Federation for 15 years of good service. Inscription on reverse "ПРИ ПРЕЗИДЕНТЕ РОССИИ" (UNDER THE PRESIDENT OF RUSSIA). The 2016 order changed the ribbon from the previous military colours (left) to its present departmental specific colours (right).
	Medal "For Distinction In Military Service" 3rd class Медаль «За отличие в военной службе» III степени	No. 25 No. 7	28 December 2001 24 February 2016	Awarded to military personnel of the Directorate of Special Programs of the President of the Russian Federation for 10 years of good service. Inscription on reverse "ПРИ ПРЕЗИДЕНТЕ РОССИИ" (UNDER THE PRESIDENT OF RUSSIA). The 2016 order changed the ribbon from the previous military colours (left) to its present departmental specific colours (right).

=== Decorations ===
Award	Name (English/Russian)	Order	Inception date	Criteria
	Breast badge "Honoured Fellow of the Main Directorate of the GUSP" Нагрудный Знак «Почетный сотрудник Главного управления ГУСП»	No. 26-SP No. 7	28 December 2001 24 February 2016	Highest departmental award of the GUSP. Awarded to personnel of the Main Directorate of the GUSP of the Russian Federation and to other persons, who have made a significant contribution to the development and implementation of state policy, regulatory and normative-legal regulation in the sphere of activities of the GUSP, in the development of the GUSP, in the implementation of the powers conferred to the GUSP, who were previously awarded departmental awards of the GUSP: for long-term and effective state civil service; for reasonable initiative, diligence and distinction in the service; for many years of conscientious and impeccable work.
	Breast badge "Honoured Fellow of the Service in Sensitive Sites under the President of the Russian Federation" Нагрудный Знак «Почетный сотрудник Службы специальных объектов при Президенте Российской Федерации»	No. 7	24 February 2016	Awarded to civil servants of the GUSP of the Russian Federation and to other persons assisting in solving the tasks assigned to the GUSP: for a great contribution to the development of the GUSP and in solving the tasks assigned to the GUSP, if previously awarded the decoration "For Service in Sensitive Sites" 1st class.
	Breast badge "For Service in Sensitive Sites"; 1st class Нагрудный Знак «За службу на спецобъектах» I степени	No. 7	24 February 2016	Awarded to military and civilian personnel serving in sensitive sites of the Directorate of Special Programs of the President of the Russian Federation with seniority of at least 15 years, for great personal contribution at increasing the security and defense readiness of sensitive sites of the Directorate of Special Programs of the President of the Russian Federation, for distinction in performance, for initiative and perseverance.
	Breast badge "For Service in Sensitive Sites"; 2nd class Нагрудный Знак «За службу на спецобъектах» II степени	No. 7	24 February 2016	Awarded to military and civilian personnel serving in sensitive sites of the Directorate of Special Programs of the President of the Russian Federation with seniority of at least 10 years, for great personal contribution at increasing the security and defense readiness of sensitive sites of the Directorate of Special Programmes of the President of the Russian Federation, for distinction in performance, for initiative and perseverance.
	Breast badge "For Service in Sensitive Sites"; 3rd class Нагрудный Знак «За службу на спецобъектах» III степени	No. 7	24 February 2016	Awarded to military and civilian personnel serving in sensitive sites of the Directorate of Special Programs of the President of the Russian Federation with seniority of at least 5 years, for great personal contribution at increasing the security and defense readiness of sensitive sites of the Directorate of Special Programmes of the President of the Russian Federation, for distinction in performance, for initiative and perseverance.
	Jubilee badge "XXV Years of the GUSP" Юбилейный знак «ГУСП XXV»	No. ?	?	Departmental order not yet found and is possibly unpublished to date.
	Jubilee badge "XXX Years of the GUSP" Юбилейный знак «ГУСП XXX»	No. ?	?	Departmental order not yet found and is possibly unpublished to date.

== State Courier Service ==

=== Medals ===
Award	Name (English/Russian)	Order	Inception date	Criteria
	Cross "For Merit" Крест «За заслуги»	No. 66 No. 250 No. 130 No. 138	3 March 2004 22 July 2005 16 April 2010 28 April 2016	Awarded to employees of the central apparatus of the State Courier Service of Russia, its territorial bodies and subordinate organizations, who have served (worked) flawlessly in the communications system of the State Courier Service of Russia for fifteen of more years and have previously been awarded the Medal "For Faithful Duty" of the State Courier Service of Russia, for merit in the field of state communications and impeccable service (work). May also be awarded to other persons for providing assistance in solving the assigned tasks of the Federal Courier Service of Russia.
	Medal "For Zeal" 1st Class Медаль «За усердие» I степени	No. 66 No. 250 No. 130 No. 138	3 March 2004 22 July 2005 16 April 2010 28 April 2016	Awarded to employees of the central apparatus of the State Courier Service of Russia, its territorial bodies and subordinate organizations who have served (worked) in the State Courier Service of Russia for five or more years. To officers of federal courier communications, if previously awarded the Medal for Zeal 2nd class and the decoration of the State Courier Service of Russia "For Excellence" or "For Distinction", for initiative, diligence and excellence in the performance of duties. To federal civil servants, replacing in a position of the federal state civil service system of the Federal Courier Service of Russia, if previously awarded the Medal for Zeal 2nd class, the Diploma of Honour of the Federal Courier Service of Russia or a note of gratitude, for excellent and effective service; to employees of the State Courier Service of the Russian Federation, in replacement positions, not in posts of the federal state civil service system of the State Courier Service of Russia, as well as to workers and employees of territorial bodies of the State Courier Service of Russia and its subordinate organizations, if previously awarded the Medal for Zeal 2nd class, the Diploma of Honour of the Federal Courier Service of Russia or a note of gratitude, for the diligent execution of duties, initiative, hard work and high achievements in labour. May also be awarded to other persons for providing assistance in solving the assigned tasks of the Federal Courier Service of Russia.
	Medal "For Zeal" 2nd Class Медаль «За усердие» II степени	No. 66 No. 250 No. 130 No. 138	3 March 2004 22 July 2005 16 April 2010 28 April 2016	Awarded to employees of the central apparatus of the State Courier Service of Russia, its territorial bodies and subordinate organizations who have served (worked) in the Federal Courier Service of Russia for five or more years. To officers of federal courier communications, if previously awarded the decoration of the State Courier Service of the Russian Federation "For Excellence" or "For Distinction", for initiative, diligence and excellence in the performance of duties. To federal civil servants, replacing in a position of the federal state civil service system of the State Courier Service of Russia, if previously awarded the Diploma of Honour of the State Courier Service of Russia or a note of gratitude, for excellent and effective service; to employees of the Federal Courier Service of the Russian Federation, in replacement positions, not in posts of the federal state civil service system of the Federal Courier Service of Russia, as well as to workers and employees of territorial bodies of the Federal Courier Service of Russia and its subordinate organizations, if previously awarded the Diploma of Honour of the State Courier Service of Russia or a note of gratitude, for the diligent execution of duties, initiative, hard work and high achievements in labour. May also be awarded to other persons for providing assistance in solving the assigned tasks of the State Courier Service of Russia.
	Medal "For Faithful Duty" Медаль «За верность долгу»	No. 545 No. 250 No. 130 No. 138	31 August 2001 22 July 2005 16 April 2010 28 April 2016	Awarded to employees of the central apparatus of the State Courier Service of Russia, its territorial bodies and subordinate organizations, who have served in the communications system of the Federal Courier Service of Russia for fifteen years or more and have previously been awarded the Medal for Zeal 1st class of the State Courier Service of Russia, for initiative and distinction in the performance of duties. May be awarded to other persons for assistance in carrying out the tasks assigned to the State Courier Service of Russia.
	Medal "Veteran of the Federal Courier Service" Медаль «Ветеран фельдъегерской службы»	No. 368 No. 250 No. 204	22 October 2004 22 July 2005 8 July 2016	Awarded to employees of the central office of the State Courier Service of Russia, its territorial bodies and subordinate organizations, to officers of federal courier communications with twenty-five years or more of seniority of which fifteen or more were within the Federal Courier Service of Russia, for exemplary performance of duties and distinguished accomplishments in service; to federal civil servants, in a replacement position of the federal civil service system of the State Courier Service of Russia who have served (worked) in bodies of the State Courier Service of Russia for twenty-five years or more, for excellent and efficient service; to employees of the State Courier Service of Russia, in replacement positions, not in posts of the federal state civil service system of the State Courier Service of Russia, as well as the workers and employees of territorial bodies of the State Courier Service of Russia and its subordinate organizations, that worked in the Federal Courier Service of Russia for twenty-five or more years, for the faithful performance of duties.
	Medal "For Promotion" Медаль «За содействие»	No. 132 No. 138	18 May 2006 28 April 2016	Awarded to citizens of the Russian Federation and foreign nationals who assist in addressing and overcoming the challenges faced by the State Courier Service of Russia.
	Medal "For Labour Valour" Медаль «За трудовую доблесть»	No. 130 No. 138	16 April 2010 28 April 2016	Awarded to employees of the central office of the State Courier Service of Russia, its territorial bodies and subordinate organizations (except officers of the State Courier communications entities), who have worked for twenty-five years or more, with at least 10 of them within the State Courier Service of Russia: To federal civil servants who occupy posts in the state civil service in the Federal Courier Service of Russia, for excellent and efficient civil service in the Federal Courier Service of Russia. To employees of the Federal Courier Service of Russia, in replacement positions that are not positions in the State Courier Service of Russia, as well as to employees of territorial bodies of the State Courier Service of Russia and its subordinate organizations, for the faithful performance of duties. May also be awarded to the aforementioned for an outstanding contribution to the development and improvement of the State Courier Service of Russia, regardless of length of service. May also be awarded to other persons for assistance in solving the tasks assigned to the State Courier Service of Russia.
	Medal "Lieutenant General of Internal Troops B.I. Krasnopevtsev" Медаль «Генерал-лейтенант внутренней службы Б.И. Краснопевцев»	No. 130 No. 138	16 April 2010 28 April 2016	Awarded to employees of the central apparatus of the State Courier Service of Russia and its territorial bodies and subordinate organizations, who impeccably served for (worked in) the State Courier Service of Russia for not less than 10 years, for personal contribution to the development and improvement of the State Courier Service of Russia; for patriotic education of the State Courier Service of Russia; for the promotion of the State Courier Service of Russia; for strengthening international cooperation between courier agencies in friendly states – participants of the Intergovernmental Agreement on the communication by courier; to others for assisting in the tasks entrusted to the State Courier Service of Russia.
	Medal "For Impeccable Service" 1st Class Медаль «За безупречную службу» I степени	No. 545 No. 250 No. 130 No. 138	31 August 2001 22 July 2005 16 April 2010 28 April 2016	Awarded to members of the State Courier Service, for good service over a period of 20 years. The length of service takes into account service in law-enforcement bodies, in the military and any other federal service which provides military and/or special ranks.
	Medal "For Impeccable Service" 2nd Class Медаль «За безупречную службу» II степени	No. 545 No. 250 No. 130 No. 138	31 August 2001 22 July 2005 16 April 2010 28 April 2016	Awarded to members of the State Courier Service, for good service over a period of 15 years. The length of service takes into account service in law-enforcement bodies, in the military and any other federal service which provides military and/or special ranks.
	Medal "For Impeccable Service" 3rd Class Медаль «За безупречную службу» II степени	No. 545 No. 250 No. 130 No. 138	31 August 2001 22 July 2005 16 April 2010 28 April 2016	Awarded to members of the State Courier Service, for good service over a period of 10 years. The length of service takes into account service in law-enforcement bodies, in the military and any other federal service which provides military and/or special ranks.

=== Decorations ===
Award	Name (English/Russian)	Order	Inception date	Criteria
	Decoration "Honoured Fellow of the Federal Courier Service of the Russian Federation" Почетный знак «Почетный Сотрудник Государственной фельдъегерской службы Российской Федерации»	No. 130 No. 138	16 April 2010 28 April 2016	Awarded for special merit in the development and improvement of the State Courier Service of Russia over many years of conscientious work. It can be bestowed upon officers of the State Courier Service of Russia with seniority of twenty-five years or more with at least 15 of those years in the State Courier Service of Russia. The length of service includes service in bodies of internal affairs, military service, other service where there are special titles, as well as work in the State Courier Service of Russia in positions of employees or workers. To federal civil servants who occupy posts in the State Courier Service of Russia, employees of the State Courier Service of Russia in replacement positions not positions in the federal civil service system of the State Courier Service of Russia, as well as the workers and employees of territorial bodies of the State Courier Service of Russia and its subordinate organizations, who have twenty-five years seniority or more with at least 15 of those years in the State Courier Service of Russia. Type 1 at left, type 2 at right.
	Decoration "State Courier Service of the Russian Federation" Почетный знак «Государственной фельдъегерской службы Российской Федерации»	No. 65 No. 250 No. 130 No. 138	3 March 2004 22 July 2005 16 April 2010 28 April 2016	Awarded to employees of the central office of the State Courier Service of Russia, its territorial bodies and subordinate organizations for outstanding service in the field of development and improvement of the state courier communications, as well as to other persons providing assistance in solving the assigned tasks of the State Courier Service of Russia.
	Breast badge "For Distinction" нагрудный знак «За отличие»	No. 187 No. 250 No. 130 No. 138	14 April 1998 22 July 2005 16 April 2010 28 April 2016	Awarded to officers of the command structure of state courier communications with at least 3 years of service in the State Courier Service of Russia, for the faithful performance of duties and high performance indicators.
	Decoration "XXV Years of Excellent Service in Courier Communications" Знак отличия «XXV лет безупречной службы в фельдъегерской связи»	No. 250 No. 130	22 July 2005 16 April 2010	Awarded to officers in command positions of federal courier communications who have served in the State Courier Service of Russia for twenty-five years or more, for exemplary performance of duties and good results in the service. Type 1 award discontinued in 2010, replaced by the type 2 award.
	Decoration "XXV Years of Excellent Service in Courier Communications" Знак отличия «XXV лет безупречной службы в фельдъегерской связи»	No. 130 No. 138	16 April 2010 28 April 2016	Awarded to officers in command positions of federal courier communications who have served in the State Courier Service of Russia for twenty-five years or more, for exemplary performance of duties and good results in the service. Type 2 award created in 2010, replaced the type 1 award.
	Decoration "XXX Years of Excellent Service in Courier Communications" Знак отличия «XXX лет безупречной службы в фельдъегерской связи»	No. 130 No. 138	16 April 2010 28 April 2016	Awarded to officers in command positions of federal courier communications who have served in the State Courier Service of Russia for thirty years or more, for exemplary performance of duties and good results in the service.
	Breast badge "210 Years of Russian Courier Communications" Нагрудный знак «210 лет Российской фельдъегерской связи»	No. 250	22 July 2005	Awarded to employees of the State Courier Service of Russia, for exemplary performance of official duties, for achieving good results in service (work), and to mark the 210th anniversary of Russian state courier communications. May be awarded to other persons for assistance in solving the assigned tasks of the State Courier Service of Russia.
	Commemorative badge "220 Years of Russian Courier Communications" Памятный знак «220 лет Российской фельдъегерской связи»	No. 241	2 August 2016	Awarded to employees of the GFS of Russia who have served (worked) in the state courier system of Russia for not less than 1 year: to officers of the bodies of federal courier communications for initiative, diligence and excellence in performance; to federal civil servants who occupy posts in the state civil service in bodies of federal courier communications for excellent and efficient civil service; to employees of territorial bodies of the GFS of Russia for the faithful performance of duties; to other persons for assistance in solving the tasks assigned to the GFS Russia.

== Federal Customs Service ==
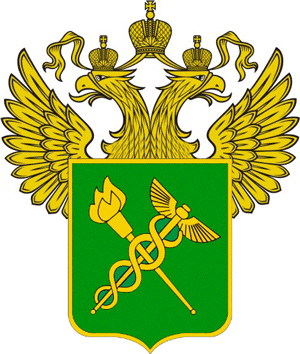

=== Medals ===
Award	Name (English/Russian)	Order	Inception date	Criteria
	Medal "Dmitry Bibikov" Медаль «Дмитрий Бибиков»	No. 1804	7 September 2012	Awarded to officers and employees of customs bodies of the Russian Federation and institutions administered by the Federal Customs Service of Russia, of customs offices of the Russian Federation abroad, as well as to other persons assisting in the tasks entrusted to the customs authorities, for strengthening international customs cooperation and assistance to the Federal Customs Service in ensuring the economic security of the Russian Federation; for the development and improvement of the customs system of the Russian Federation; for performing the tasks assigned to the customs authorities of the Russian Federation.
	Medal "For Valour" Медаль «За доблесть»	No. 300 No. 97	26 March 2001 1 October 2004	Awarded to officials and employees of the customs authorities for the courageous and decisive action in the service or civic duty in conditions of risk to life. For the successful completion of tasks of particular importance and complexity of importance for the entire customs system; for direct participation in special events to fight crime in the customs sphere, smuggling of goods, weapons, drugs, radioactive and fissile materials; for personal courage and bravery shown in the line of duty in a risk to life; for dedicated action to protect the lives, health, honour and dignity of the citizens of Russia.
	Medal "For Diligence" Медаль «За усердие»	No. 300 No. 97	26 March 2001 1 October 2004	Awarded to officers and employees of the customs authorities of the Russian Federation for outstanding results in the protection of the economic interests and economic security of the Russian Federation; for outstanding performance and organisational skills; for the development and introduction of advanced technologies; for initiative and high performance in operational and business activities; for improving the professional and pedagogical skills; for significant contribution to training for the customs authorities of the Russian Federation.
	Medal "For Strengthening Cooperation between Customs services" Медаль «За укрепление таможенного содружества»	No. 300 No. 97	26 March 2001 1 October 2004	Awarded to officials and employees of the customs authorities of the Russian Federation for personal contribution to the development of customs co-operation with the Customs Union of Nations and strengthening collaboration with the customs authorities of other States; to citizens of the Russian Federation for assisting the customs authorities of Russia to face challenges; to foreign nationals, including members of the customs authorities of other states, for strengthening the level cooperation and business ties with customs authorities of the Russian Federation.
	Medal "For Distinction In Service" 1st Class Медаль «За Отличие В Службе» I степени	No. 300 No. 97	26 March 2001 1 October 2004	Awarded to customs officers of the Russian Federation for impeccable service over a period of 20 years. The reverse inscription reads «За службу в таможенных органах» (For service in customs).
	Medal "For Distinction In Service" 2nd Class Медаль «За Отличие В Службе» II степени	No. 300 No. 97	26 March 2001 1 October 2004	Awarded to customs officers of the Russian Federation for impeccable service over a period of 15 years. The reverse inscription reads «За службу в таможенных органах» (For service in customs).
	Medal "For Distinction In Service" 3rd Class Медаль «За Отличие В Службе» III степени	No. 300 No. 97	26 March 2001 1 October 2004	Awarded to customs officers of the Russian Federation for impeccable service over a period of 10 years. The reverse inscription reads «За службу в таможенных органах» (For service in customs).
	Jubilee Medal "25 years of the Federal Customs Service of Russia" Юбилейный медаль «25 лет Федеральной таможенной службе»	No. 1090	1 June 2016	Awarded to officers and employees of customs bodies of the Russian Federation, to representatives of the customs service of the Russian Federation in foreign states, of institutions administered by the Russian Federal Customs Service who have made a significant contribution to the establishment, development and improvement of the customs service. May also be awarded to citizens of the Russian Federation and foreign nationals for assistance in the tasks entrusted to the customs authorities of the Russian Federation. Russian citizens who have served in (worked in) institutions of the customs authorities for at least 20 years and were actively involved in the promotion of the best traditions of Russian customs may also be awarded the medal.

=== Decorations ===
Award	Name (English/Russian)	Order	Inception date	Criteria
	Breast badge "Honoured Customs Officer of Russia" Нагрудный знак «Почетный таможенник России»	No. 97	1 October 2004	Awarded to officers and employees of customs bodies and institutions of the Federal Customs Service of Russia, for promoting the economic interests and security of the Russian Federation, who have made a special contribution to the formation, development and improvement of the customs system of Russia. May also be awarded to pensioners who have worked with the customs authorities for at least 20 years and have made a significant contribution to the customs service of the Russian Federation, and in exceptional cases, to the heads of state bodies and organizations of the Russian Federation, citizens of states of the Commonwealth of Independent States or of foreign countries, for helping Russian customs authorities in carrying out their duties.
	Breast badge "For Special Distinction" Нагрудный знак «За особые отличия»	No. 1804	7 September 2012	Awarded to officers and employees of customs bodies of the Russian Federation and institutions administered by the Federal Customs Service of Russia, representatives of the customs service of the Russian Federation abroad, previously awarded the Medal of the Federal Customs Service of Russia "For diligence", for special service: in the protection of the economic interests and economic security of the Russian Federation; in the performance of tasks of special importance and complexity; in the organization and the strengthening of international customs cooperation.
	Breast badge "Excellent in the Customs Service" Нагрудный знак «Отличник таможенной службы»	No. 97	1 October 2004	Awarded to officers and employees of customs bodies and institutions of the Russian Federal Customs Service for exemplary performance of official duties, high level of professionalism, considerable personal contribution to the protection of the economic interests and economic security of the Russian Federation who have worked in the customs system for at least 5 years.
	Breast badge "For the Development of the Russian Customs Service" Нагрудный знак «За развитие таможенной службы России»	No. 97 No. 731	1 October 2004 22 April 2009	Awarded to the highest ranking leaders of the customs authorities of the Russian Federation, of institutions under the Federal Customs Service of Russia, as well as those previously serving in these positions, for special contribution to the establishment, development and improvement of the customs system of the Russian Federation, the economic security of the Russian Federation and the organization of effective work of the customs bodies of the Russian Federation; to government leaders, for great personal contribution to the strengthening of cooperation and business relations with the customs authorities of the Russian Federation, and for assistance in protecting the economic interests of Russian Federation; to foreign citizens, including officials of customs agencies of foreign countries, for their important contribution to the strengthening of international customs cooperation and assistance to ensure the economic security of the Russian Federation.
	Breast badge "Veteran of the Customs Service" Нагрудный знак «Ветеран таможенной службы»	No. 300 No. 953 No. 97	26 March 2001 28 September 2001 1 October 2004	Awarded to officials who served impeccably in bodies of the customs service of the Russian Federation for more than 20 years. May also be awarded to veterans who have retired from the customs authorities prior to the issuance of this Order, at the request of the chairman of the Council of Veterans of the customs service of the customs authority in which they were serving.
	Jubilee breast badge "10 Years of the State Customs Committee of Russia" Юбилейный нагрудный знак «10 лет ГТК России»	No. 97	1 October 2004	Awarded to officers and employees who impeccably served in customs bodies of the Russian Federation for at least 3 (calendar) years, for personal contribution in the line of duty and having achieved good results in the protection of the economic interests of the Russian Federation. May also be awarded to veterans who have been dismissed from the customs authorities with the right to a pension and with seniority of 20 (calendar) years in the customs authorities, at the request of the Council of veterans of the customs service where they served. May also be awarded to citizens of the Russian Federation and foreign nationals for assisting Russian customs authorities in addressing the challenges they face. When awarded for exceptional merit in the performance of special tasks of great importance and complexity for the whole of the customs system, officials and employees of customs authorities and veterans discharged from the customs authorities with the right to a pension and seniority of 20 (calendar) years with the customs authorities may be awarded the jubilee badge "10 Years of the State Customs Committee of Russia" made of silver and gold.

== Federal Drug Control Service 2003–2016 ==
The Federal Drug Control Service of Russia was created by Presidential decree No. 306 of 11 March 2003. It was abolished and integrated into the Ministry of Internal Affairs by Presidential decree No. 156 of 31 May 2016.

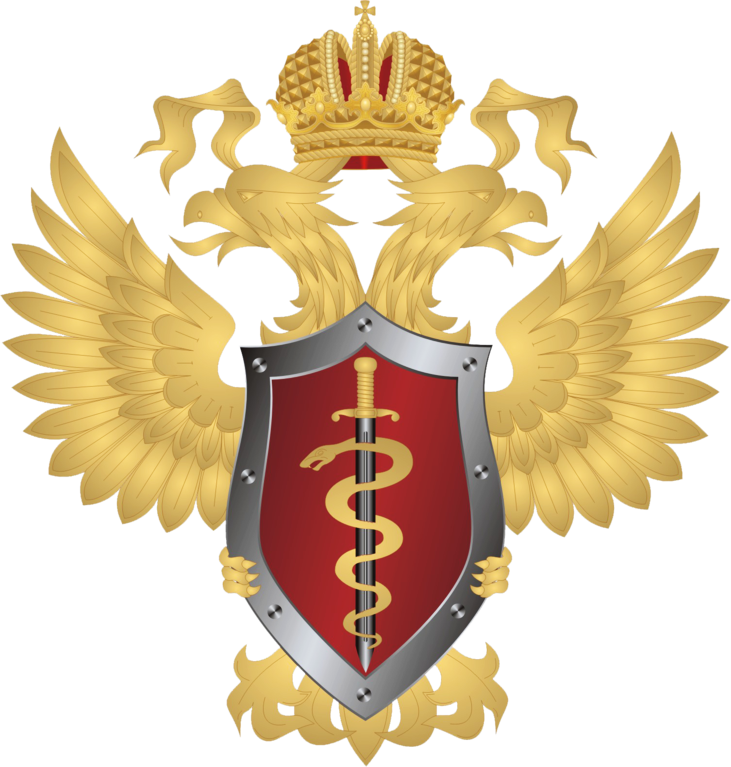

=== Medals ===
Award	Name (English/Russian)	Order	Inception date	Criteria
	Medal "For distinction in service in drug control agencies" 1st class Медаль «За отличие в службе в органах наркоконтроля» I степени	No. 203 No. 27	28 June 2005 25 January 2012	Awarded to employees of drug control authorities for exemplary performance of official duties and high results achieved in professional activities, who displayed initiative, dedication and perseverance in resolving specific tasks. The medals are awarded sequentially from the 3rd class up to the 1st. The medal 1st class can only be awarded 3 years or more after award of the medal 2nd class.
	Medal "For distinction in service in drug control agencies" 2nd class Медаль «За отличие в службе в органах наркоконтроля» II степени	No. 203 No. 27	28 June 2005 25 January 2012	Awarded to employees of drug control authorities for exemplary performance of official duties and high results achieved in professional activities, who displayed initiative, dedication and perseverance in resolving specific tasks. The medals are awarded sequentially from the 3rd class up to the 1st. The medal 2nd class can only be awarded 2 years or more after award of the medal 3rd class.
	Medal "For distinction in service in drug control agencies" 3rd class Медаль «За отличие в службе в органах наркоконтроля» III степени	No. 203 No. 27	28 June 2005 25 January 2012	Awarded to employees of drug control authorities for exemplary performance of official duties and high results achieved in professional activities, who displayed initiative, dedication and perseverance in resolving specific tasks. The medals are awarded sequentially from the 3rd class up to the 1st. The medal 3rd class can only be awarded 2 years or more after award of the Certificate of Honour of the Federal Service for Drug Control of the Russian Federation.
	Medal "For assistance to drug control agencies" Медаль «За содействие органам наркоконтроля»	No. 203	28 June 2005	Awarded to persons who render assistance to drug control authorities in the resolution of the tasks assigned to them.

=== Decorations ===
Award	Name (English/Russian)	Order	Inception date	Criteria
	Breast Badge for the Title "Honoured Officer of Drug Control Authorities" Нагрудного знака к званию «Почетный сотрудник органов наркоконтроля»	No. 203 No. 27	28 June 2005 25 January 2012	Awarded to employees of drug control authorities for special services in identifying, preventing, suppressing and uncovering crimes in the jurisdiction of drug control agencies, who have made a significant contribution in ensuring the activities of drug control agencies and having a length of service in drug control agencies of no less than 20 years.
	Decoration "For Merit" Памятный знак «За заслуги»	No. 138	27 April 2005	Awarded to employees and federal state civil servants of drug control authorities, who made a significant contribution to the development, establishment and operations of drug control agencies; to employees discharged from drug control bodies who made a significant contribution to the development, establishment and operations of drug control agencies; to citizens of the Russian Federation for assistance to drug control authorities in solving the tasks assigned to them.

== Federal Border Service 1993–2003 ==
Created on 30 December 1993 to replace the Border Guard Service of the KGB following the collapse of the Soviet Union, the Federal Border Service of Russia (Russian: Федеральная пограничная служба России) barely lasted a decade. It was given full autonomy by President Boris Yeltsin in an effort to reduce the power of the KGB, but was re absorbed into the new Federal Security Service on 11 March 2003 by President Vladimir Putin and renamed the Border Guard Service of the FSB of the Russian Federation (Russian: Пограничная служба Федеральной службы безопасности Российской Федерации). The Federal Border Service had its own awards subordinate to state awards. These awards, although now redesigned to be in line with the awards of the FSB, remain listed in the order of precedence of the FSB and worn on the uniform of pre 2003 recipients.

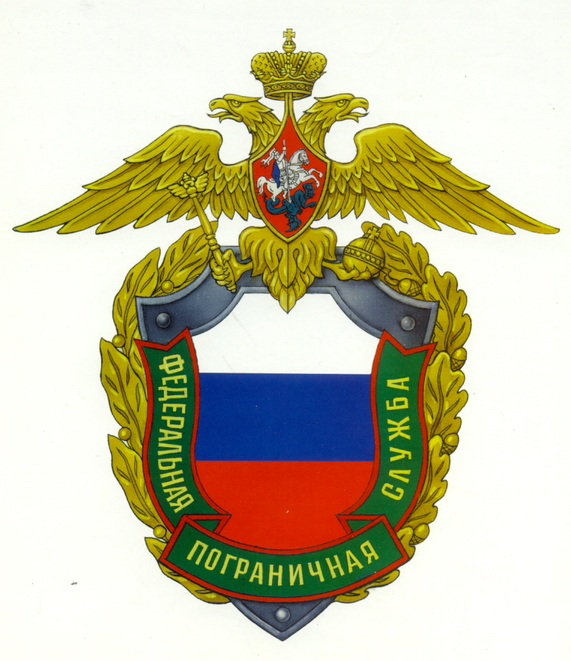

=== Medals ===
Award	Name (English/Russian)	Ministerial Order	Inception or amendment date	Criteria
	Medal "For Strengthening Military Cooperation" Медаль «За укрепление боевого содружества»	No. 309	5 July 1995	Awarded to servicemen and members of the civilian personnel of the Federal Border Service of Russia, of bodies and military units of the Federal Border Service of Russia, and in some cases to other citizens of the Russian Federation and foreign citizens, for service in strengthening military cooperation and comradeship with friendly states.
	Medal "For Distinction in Military Service"; 1st Class Медаль «За Отличие В Военной Службе» I степени	No. 309	5 July 1995	Awarded to personnel of the Federal Border Service of the Russian Federation for 20 years of distinguished service. Inscription on reverse "Федеральная Пограничная Служба Российской Федерации" (Federal Border Service Russian Federation).
	Medal "For Distinction in Military Service"; 2nd Class Медаль «За Отличие В Военной Службе» II степени	No. 309	5 July 1995	Awarded to personnel of the Federal Border Service of the Russian Federation for 15 years of distinguished service. Inscription on reverse "Федеральная Пограничная Служба Российской Федерации" (Federal Border Service Russian Federation).
	Medal "For Distinction in Military Service"; 3rd Class Медаль «За Отличие В Военной Службе» III степени	No. 309	5 July 1995	Awarded to personnel of the Federal Border Service of the Russian Federation for 10 years of distinguished service. Inscription on reverse "Федеральная Пограничная Служба Российской Федерации" (Federal Border Service Russian Federation).

=== Breast badges ===
Award	Name (English/Russian)	Ministerial order	Inception or amendment date	Criteria
	Breast Badge "Honoured Fellow of the Border Service" Нагрудный знак «Почетный сотрудник погранслужбы»	No. 311	30 June 2000	Awarded to servicemen of the Border Service of the Russian Federation and persons discharged from military service into the reserves (retired), who impeccably served in the armed forces, agencies and organizations of the Border Service of the Russian Federation with not less than 20 years of service and previously awarded the Medal "For Distinction in Guarding the State Border of the USSR" or the Medal "For Distinction in the Protection of the State Borders" and who a special personal contribution to the security and protection of the State Border, for the training and education of personnel, strengthening the combat readiness of formations, military units and subunits. The Director of the Federal Border Service of Russia may decide to award the badge to other persons for services rendered to the Border Service of the Russian Federation in solving the military and operational tasks for the security and protection of the State Border of the Russian Federation.
	Breast Badge for the Title "Honoured Border Guard of the Russian Federation" Нагрудного знака к званию «Заслуженный пограничник Российской Федерации»	No. 530 No. 1099	28 May 1997 7 September 2010	Title awarded to servicemen with at least for 15 years or more in military service for their services in strengthening security and protecting the state border of the Russian Federation. The title was abolished in 2010.
	Badge "For Merit"; 1st class Знак «За Заслуги» I степени	No. 90 No. 676	9 February 1995 13 November 2001	Awarded to servicemen and civilian personnel of the Border Guard Service of the Russian Federation, as well as other persons: for initiative and diligence displayed in the performance of official duties of guarding and protecting the state border of the Russian Federation, the external borders of the Commonwealth of Independent States, for the protection of inland waters, Territorial seas, exclusive economic zones, the continental shelf of the Russian Federation and their natural resources, as well as for other services rendered during military service; For personal exemplary work and other merit in work activities and civil service in the Border Guard Service; For active assistance to the Border Guard Service in solving the problems it faces in carrying out the tasks assigned to it. The award comes in two classes, 1st and 2nd awarded sequentially beginning with the lower 2nd class. The recipient of the badge 1st class must have been previously awarded the badge 2nd class for a minimum of 1 year. Civilian personnel of the Border Guard Service may be awarded the badge 1st class for 15 years of continuous and impeccable work in the troops, bodies and organizations of the Border Guard Service.
	Badge "For Merit"; 2nd class Знак «За Заслуги» II степени	No. 90 No. 676	9 February 1995 13 November 2001	Awarded to servicemen and civilian personnel of the Border Guard Service of the Russian Federation, as well as other persons: for initiative and diligence displayed in the performance of official duties of guarding and protecting the state border of the Russian Federation, the external borders of the Commonwealth of Independent States, for the protection of inland waters, Territorial seas, exclusive economic zones, the continental shelf of the Russian Federation and their natural resources, as well as for other services rendered during military service; For personal exemplary work and other merit in work activities and civil service in the Border Guard Service; For active assistance to the Border Guard Service in solving the problems it faces in carrying out the tasks assigned to it. The award comes in two classes, 1st and 2nd awarded sequentially beginning with the lower 2nd class. The recipient of the badge 2nd class must have been previously awarded the badge "Excellent Border Guard" 1st class. Civilian personnel of the Border Guard Service may be awarded the badge 2nd class for 10 years of continuous and impeccable work in the troops, bodies and organizations of the Border Guard Service.
	Decoration "Excellent Border Guard" 1st class Знак отличия «Отличник Погранслужбы» I степени	No. 60	31 January 1996	Awarded to servicemen of the Border Guard Service of the Russian Federation for exemplary service in the protection of the state border and the exclusive economic zone of the Russian Federation, for high quality performance in service and in combat tasks, as well as for excellent performance in combat training during manoeuvers and for exemplary military discipline. May also be awarded to other persons for concrete and real assistance to Russian border guards in protecting the state border and the exclusive economic zone of the Russian Federation. Badges are awarded sequentially from the 3rd to the 1st class. Each class may only be awarded a single time to an individual.
	Decoration "Excellent Border Guard" 2nd class Знак отличия «Отличник Погранслужбы» II степени	No. 60	31 January 1996	Awarded to servicemen of the Border Guard Service of the Russian Federation for exemplary service in the protection of the state border and the exclusive economic zone of the Russian Federation, for high quality performance in service and in combat tasks, as well as for excellent performance in combat training during manoeuvers and for exemplary military discipline. May also be awarded to other persons for concrete and real assistance to Russian border guards in protecting the state border and the exclusive economic zone of the Russian Federation. Badges are awarded sequentially from the 3rd to the 1st class. Each class may only be awarded a single time to an individual.
	Decoration "Excellent Border Guard" 3rd class Знак отличия «Отличник Погранслужбы» III степени	No. 60	31 January 1996	Awarded to servicemen of the Border Guard Service of the Russian Federation for exemplary service in the protection of the state border and the exclusive economic zone of the Russian Federation, for high quality performance in service and in combat tasks, as well as for excellent performance in combat training during manoeuvers and for exemplary military discipline. May also be awarded to other persons for concrete and real assistance to Russian border guards in protecting the state border and the exclusive economic zone of the Russian Federation. Badges are awarded sequentially from the 3rd to the 1st class. Each class may only be awarded a single time to an individual.
	Badge "For Service in the Caucasus" Знак «За службу на Кавказе»	No. 91	19 February 1995	Awarded to military and civilian components, units of the Federal Border Service deployed in the North Caucasus and the Caucasus, for distinction in the performance of military duties with the highest rates in the service and training that have made a concrete contribution to the protection and defence of state borders, strengthening military discipline and education personnel.
	Badge "For Service in Tajikistan" Знак «За службу в Таджикистане»	No. 91	19 February 1995	Awarded to military and civilian components, units of the border service, border guards in border outposts 12 and 13, the Moscow border detachment of the Federal Border Service in the Republic of Tajikistan, for courage in dealing with combat tasks in the protection of state borders.
	Badge "For Service in the Arctic" Знак «За службу в Заполярье»	No. ?	1 April 1997	Awarded to military and civilian components, units of the border service deployed in the Arctic, for distinction in the performance of military duties with the highest rates in the service and training that have made a concrete contribution to the protection and defence of state borders, strengthening military discipline and education personnel.
	Badge "For Service in the Far East" Знак «За службу на Дальнем Востоке»	No. ?	1 April 1997	Awarded to military and civilian components, units of the border service deployed in the Far East, the Pacific or the North East for distinction in the performance of military duties with the highest rates in the service and training that have made a concrete contribution to the protection and defence of state borders, strengthening military discipline and education personnel.
	Jubilee breast badge "80 Years of Border Troops" Юбилейный нагрудный знак «80 лет погранвойск»	No. ?	1998	Departmental order not yet found and possibly remains unpublished to date by decision of the FSB.
	Breast Badge "For Service on the Border" 100 Patrols Нагрудный знак «За пограничную службу» 100 патрулей	No. ?	31 January 1996	Awarded for 100 patrols on the state border of the Russian Federation. A patrol consisted of two four-hour outings in a 24-hour period.
	Breast Badge "For Service on the Border" 200 Patrols Нагрудный знак «За пограничную службу» 200 патрулей	No. ?	31 January 1996	Awarded for 200 patrols on the state border of the Russian Federation. A patrol consisted of two four-hour outings in a 24-hour period.
	Breast Badge "For Service on the Border" 300 Patrols Нагрудный знак «За пограничную службу» 300 патрулей	No. ?	31 January 1996	Awarded for 300 patrols on the state border of the Russian Federation. A patrol consisted of two four-hour outings in a 24-hour period.

== Federal Agency for Government Communication and Information (FAPSI) 1991–2003 ==
First created by Mikhail Gorbachev in 1991 from the fragmentation of KGB sub-departments following the collapse of the Soviet Union and then officially declared an independent service in 1993, the Federal Agency for Government Communication and Information, known as FAPSI, had its own awards subordinate to state awards. These awards are listed below with their establishment orders. These awards, although now redesigned to be in line with the awards of the FSO and FSB since FAPSI's 2004 merger with the protective service, remain listed in the order of precedence of the FSO and worn on the uniform of pre merger recipients.

=== Medals ===
Award	Name (English/Russian)	Order	Inception date	Criteria
	Medal "For Military Valour"; 1st Class Медаль "За Воинскую Доблесть"; I степени	No. ?	24 September 2002	Awarded to military personnel of federal bodies of governmental communications and information for distinction in the performance of military duties. Medal second class must be earned prior to the award of the medal first class. Complete departmental order not yet found for accurate translation to this article. No further award of the medal was made following the July 2003 absorption of FAPSI by the FSB.
	Medal "For Military Valour"; 2nd Class Медаль "За Воинскую Доблесть"; II степени	No. ?	24 September 2002	Awarded to military personnel of federal bodies of governmental communications and information for distinction in the performance of military duties. Medal second class must be earned prior to the award of the medal first class. Complete departmental order not yet found for accurate translation to this article. No further award of the medal was made following the July 2003 absorption of FAPSI by the FSB.
	Medal "For Distinguished Labour" Медаль "За отличие в труде"	No. ?	14 July 2000	Awarded to members of the civilian personnel of federal bodies of governmental communication and information for a particular contribution to the tasks entrusted to the federal authorities, for strong performance in labour, long and diligent work, who have worked for at least 15 years in federal agencies or organizations and military units under federal authority, as well as to employees of enterprises, institutions and organizations subordinate to the federal agency, of which at least 5 years were dedicated to the agency. No further award of the medal was made following the July 2003 absorption of FAPSI by the FSB.
	Medal "For Military Cooperation" Медаль "За Боевое Содружество"	No. ?	22 May 1996	Awarded to military and civilian personnel of the Russian Federation's Armed Forces, and in some cases – ordinary citizens of Russia or foreign citizens for merits in strengthening the brotherhood of arms and fostering military cooperation with friendly nations; for great personal contribution to strengthening the combat and mobilization readiness of federal bodies of governmental communications and information; for special distinction in exercises, manoeuvres and other services to the Federal Agency for Government Communications and Information. Inscription on reverse "ФАПСИ" (FAPSI). No further award of the medal was made following the July 2003 absorption of FAPSI by the FSB.
	Medal "For Distinguished Military Service" 1st Class Медаль "За Отличие В Военной Службе" I степени	No. ?	22 May 1996	Awarded to military personnel of the Federal Agency for Government Communication and Information of the Russian Federation for 20 years of good service. Inscription on reserve "ФАПСИ" (FAPSI). No further award of the medal was made following the July 2003 absorption of FAPSI by the FSB.
	Medal "For Distinguished Military Service" 2nd Class Медаль "За Отличие В Военной Службе" II степени	No. ?	22 May 1996	Awarded to military personnel of the Federal Agency for Government Communication and Information of the Russian Federation for 15 years of good service. Inscription on reserve "ФАПСИ" (FAPSI). No further award of the medal was made following the July 2003 absorption of FAPSI by the FSB.
	Medal "For Distinguished Military Service" 3rd Class Медаль "За Отличие В Военной Службе" III степени	No. ?	22 May 1996	Awarded to military personnel of the Federal Agency for Government Communication and Information of the Russian Federation for 10 years of good service. Inscription on reserve "ФАПСИ" (FAPSI). No further award of the medal was made following the July 2003 absorption of FAPSI by the FSB.

=== Decorations ===
Award	Name (English/Russian)	Order	Inception date	Criteria
	Breast badge "Honoured Fellow of FAPSI" Нагрудный знак «Почетный сотрудник ФАПСИ»	No. ?	?	Decoration was confirmed as having been awarded but Ministerial Order not yet found and is possibly unpublished to this date.
	Breast badge "For Honour and Dignity in Service to the Fatherland" Нагрудный знак "За честь и достоинство в службе Отечеству"	No. ?	?	Decoration was confirmed as having been awarded but Ministerial Order not yet found and is possibly unpublished to this date.
	Breast badge "Veteran of FAPSI" Нагрудный знак «Ветеран ФАПСИ»	No. ?	?	Decoration was confirmed as having been awarded but Ministerial Order not yet found and is possibly unpublished to this date.
	Commemorative badge "10 Years of FAPSI" Памятный знак «10 лет ФАПСИ»	No. ?	?	Decoration was confirmed as having been awarded but Ministerial Order not yet found and is possibly unpublished to this date.

== See also ==
- Federal Protective Service (Russia)
- Kremlin Regiment
- Federal Security Service (Russia)
- FAPSI
- Awards and Emblems of the Ministry of Defense of the Russian Federation
- Awards of the Ministry of Internal Affairs of Russia
- Awards of the Ministry for Emergency Situations of Russia
- Ministerial awards of the Russian Federation
- Awards and decorations of the Russian Federation
- Honorary titles of the Russian Federation
- Awards and decorations of the Soviet Union
