= Medal "For the Development of Railways" =

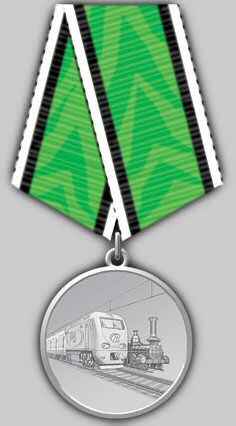
- Medal "For the Development of Railways" (obverse)
- Type: State Decoration
- Awarded for: Contribution to the development of railways in the Russian Federation
- Presented by: Russian Federation
- Eligibility: Citizens of the Russian Federation
- Status: Active
- Established: July 9, 2007
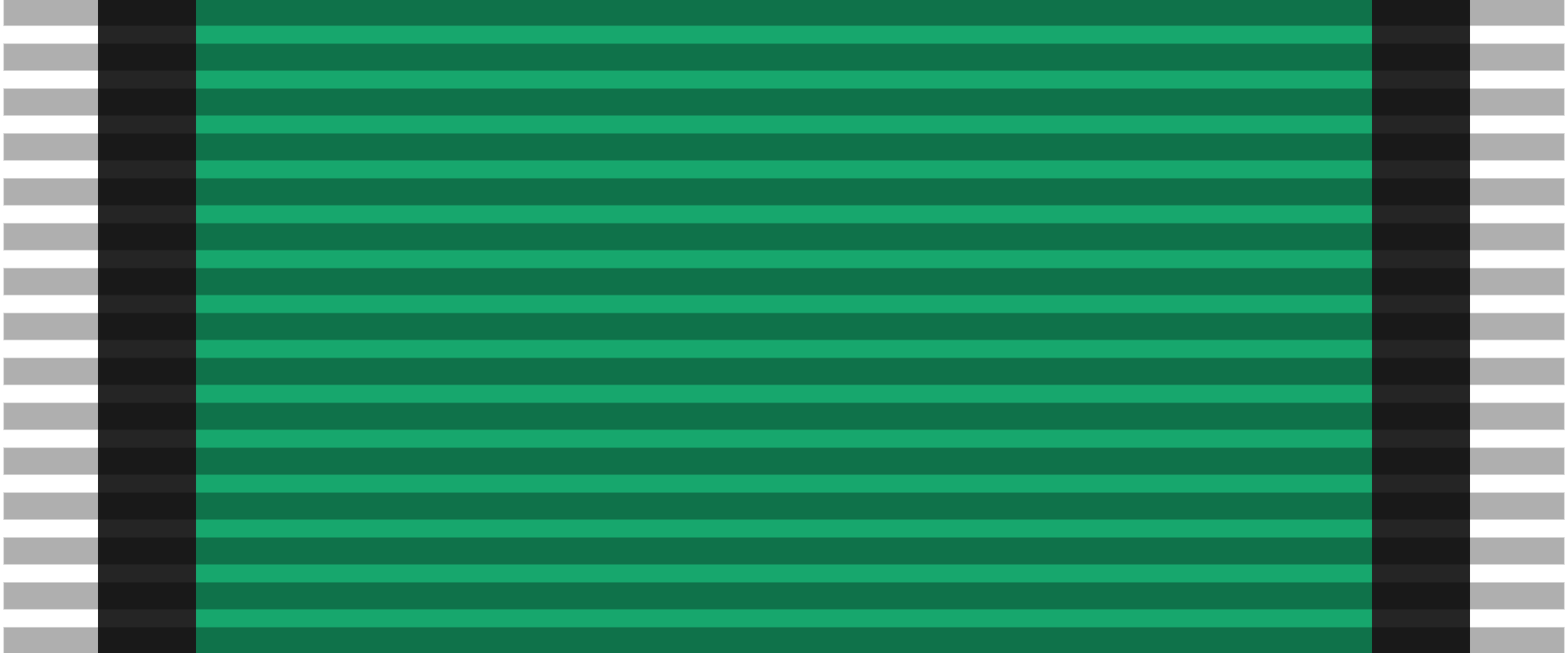
- Ribbon of the Medal "For the Development of Railways"

Precedence
- Next (higher): Medal For Work in Agriculture
- Next (lower): Medal "For Merit in the Development of Nuclear Energy"

The Medal "For the Development of Railways" (Russian: Медаль «За развитие железных дорог») is a state decoration of the Russian Federation. It was established on July 9, 2007 by Presidential Decree 852.

== Award Statute ==
The Medal "For the Development of Railways" is awarded to citizens for their contribution to the development of rail transport in the Russian Federation and for great contribution to training, research and other activities aimed at improving railway efficiency. The medal, as a rule, is awarded to those holding the honorary title "Honoured Transport Worker of the Russian Federation". The medal can also be awarded to foreign citizens for outstanding achievements in the development of rail transport in the Russian Federation.

The Russian Federation Order of Precedence dictates the Medal "For the Development of Railways" is to be worn on the left breast with other medals immediately after the Medal For Work in Agriculture.

== Award Description ==
The Medal "For the Development of Railways" is circular, made of a silver metal. It is 32 mm in diameter with raised rims on each side. The obverse of the medal bears an image of the first Russian steam locomotive and a modern locomotive. The reverse bears the inscription: "FOR THE DEVELOPMENT OF RAILWAYS" (Russian: "ЗА РАЗВИТИЕ ЖЕЛЕЗНЫХ ДОРОГ").

The medal is suspended to a standard Russian pentagonal mount by a ring through the medal suspension loop. The mount is covered by an overlapping 24mm wide silk moiré green ribbon with 2mm stripes of silver and black at both edges.

== Notable recipients ==
- Vladimir Yakunin
- Igor Levitin

== See also ==
- Awards and decorations of the Russian Federation
- Russian Railways
