= Decoration "For Beneficence" =

Decoration of Russia

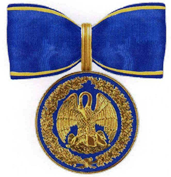
- Image of the decoration
- Type: State Decoration
- Awarded for: Acts of charity and good deeds
- Presented by: Russian Federation
- Eligibility: Russian and foreign citizens
- Status: Active
- Established: 3 May 2012
- First award: 3 May 2012

Highlights
- Total: 3 (As of May 2012)

Precedence
- Next (higher): Cross of St. George
- Next (lower): Decoration For Impeccable Service

The Decoration "For Beneficence" (Russian: Знак отличия «За благодеяние») is a decoration of Russia, established on 3 May 2012 by decree of President Dmitry Medvedev.

== Criteria ==
The Decoration "For Beneficence" may be awarded for:

- Significant charity efforts to support children's homes, nursing homes, orphanages, hospices or medical facilities in Russia;
- Public works aimed at improving the level of morality and tolerance in society, promoting human values and human rights, and combating the spread of dangerous diseases and habits;
- Contributions to the development of Russian science, culture, education or healthcare.
- Assisting Non-governmental organizations or religious organisations with socially significant activities.
- Efforts aimed at strengthening the institution of marriage and family.

== Description ==
The decoration is a round, silver-gilt medal 32 millimetres (1.3 in) in diameter with a raised rim on both sides. The obverse is colored with blue enamel. In the center is a golden image of a pelican, feeding its young. Surrounding the image is a gold oak wreath. The reverse bears the inscription "ЗА БЛАГОДЕЯНИЕ" ("FOR CHARITY") and the number of the award. The decoration is suspended from a 24 mm moire silk ribbon in blue with thin gold stripes at the edges. The gold stripes are 2 mm wide and 2 mm from the edges of the ribbon.
