= Medal "For Courage in a Fire" =

Soviet state bravery award

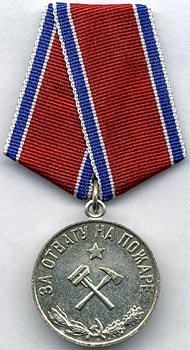
- Medal "For Courage in a Fire" (obverse)
- Type: Bravery award
- Awarded for: Leadership or courage displayed in fire fighting
- Presented by: USSR
- Eligibility: Citizens of the Soviet Union
- Status: No longer awarded
- Established: October 31, 1957

Highlights
- Total: 32,690
- Ribbon of the Medal "For Courage in a Fire"

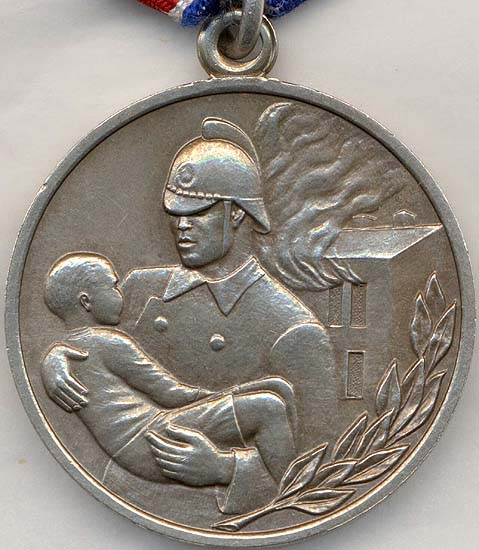
Reverse of the Medal "For Courage in a Fire"

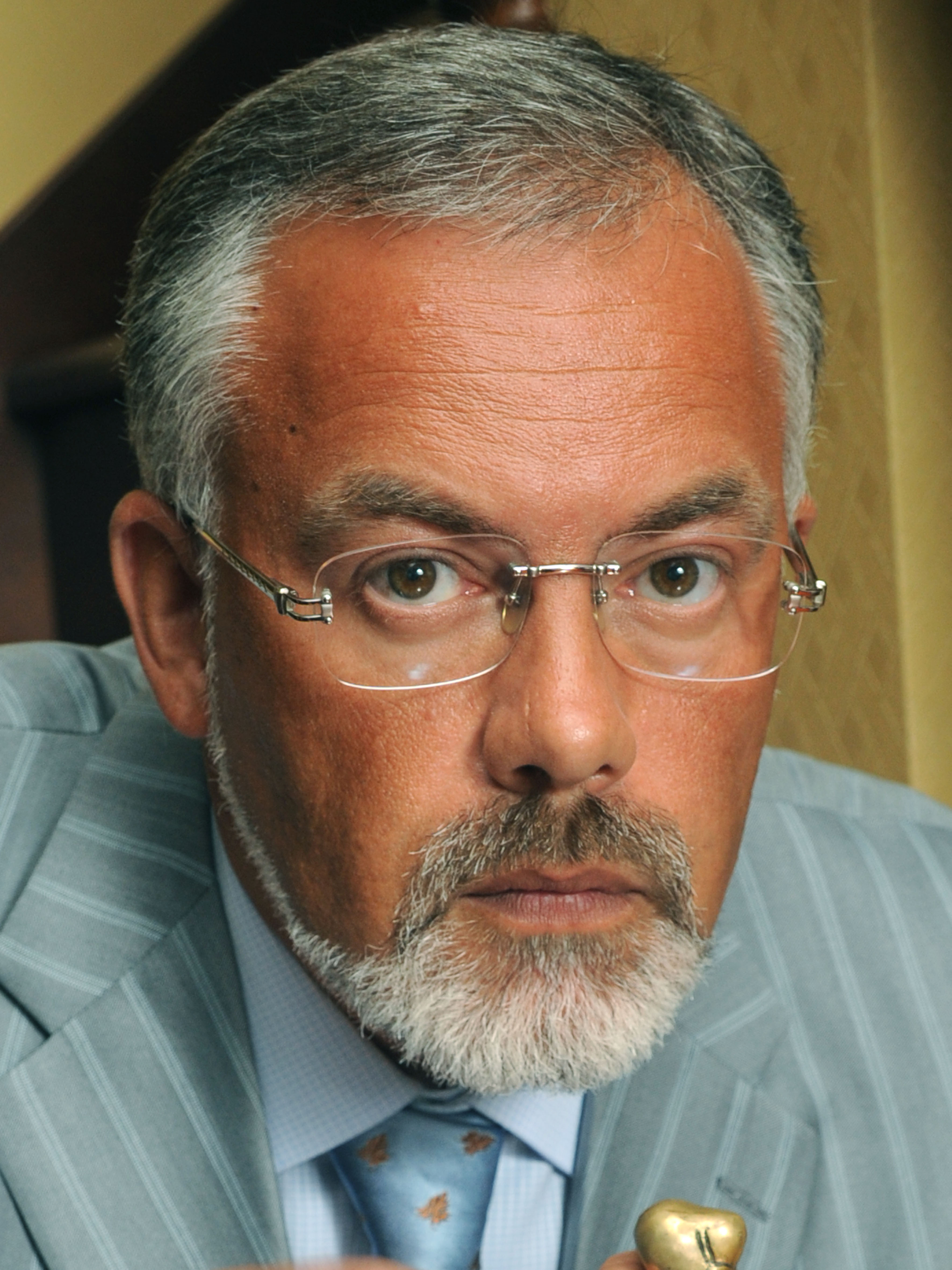
Politician Dmytro Tabachnyk, a recipient of the Medal "For Courage in a Fire"

The Medal "For Courage in a Fire" (Russian: Медаль «За отвагу на пожаре») was a civilian and military state bravery award of the Soviet Union established on October 31, 1957, by decree of the Presidium of the Supreme Soviet of the USSR to recognise deeds of courage and of leadership while fighting fires. The medal's statute was amended on July 18, 1980, by decree of the Presidium of the Supreme Soviet of the USSR No. 2523-X. The medal ceased to be awarded following the December 1991 dissolution of the Soviet Union, it was replaced in 1994 by the Russian Federation's Medal "For Life Saving" and by ministerial level awards, the Ministry of Internal Affairs and the Ministry for Emergency Situations both have medals "For Courage in a Fire".

== Medal statute ==
The Medal "For Courage in a Fire" was awarded to members of the fire service, members of volunteer fire brigades, the military and other citizens:

- for courage, bravery and selflessness displayed during fire fighting, during the rescue of people and the protection of socialist or private property from fire;
- for the leadership of firefighting units employed in fire protection, in firefighting or in rescue operations;
- for bravery, courage and perseverance displayed in order to prevent an explosion or fire.

The Medal "For Courage in a fire" was awarded on behalf of the Presidium of the Supreme Soviet of the USSR or Presidium of the Supreme Soviet of autonomous republics by chairmen, deputy chairmen and members of the Presidium of the Supreme Soviets of union and autonomous republics, the chairmen, deputy chairmen and members of the executive committees of regional, provincial, district and city councils of deputies in the community of the recipient. For military recipients, the award was made by the military chain of command.

Each medal came with an attestation of award, this attestation came in the form of a small 8 cm by 11 cm cardboard booklet bearing the award's name, the recipient's particulars and an official stamp and signature on the inside.

The Medal "For Courage in a fire" was worn on the left side of the chest and when in the presence of other medals of the USSR, it was located immediately after the Medal "For Distinction in the Protection of Public Order". If worn in the presence or awards of the Russian Federation, the latter have precedence.

Posthumous awards of the Medal "For Courage in a fire", or medals awarded to recipients since dead, were to be retained, along with the attestation of award booklet, by the family as a souvenir.

== Medal description ==
The Medal "For Courage in a Fire" was a 32 mm in diameter circular medal originally struck from silver, later examples were struck from silver-plated nickel. It had a raised rim on both sides. On the obverse in the center, the relief image of crossed fire ax and adjustable wrench below a five pointed star. At the bottom, the relief image of the hammer and sickle over laurel and oak branches, along the side and upper circumference, the relief inscription "FOR COURAGE IN A FIRE" (Russian: «ЗА ОТВАГУ НА ПОЖАРЕ»). On the reverse, in the background and to the right, a two storied house on fire, along the left circumference, a laurel branch, at the forefront and to the left, the relief image of a helmeted firefighter carrying a child.

The medal was secured to a standard Soviet pentagonal mount by a ring through the medal suspension loop. The mount was covered by a 24 mm wide red silk moiré ribbon with 3 mm wide blue edge stripes bordered on both sides by 1 mm white stripes.

== Recipients (partial list) ==
The individuals listed below were recipients of the Medal "For Courage in a Fire".

- Moscow Fire Chief, posthumous Hero of the Russian Federation, Eugene Nikolaevich Chernyshev
- Twice recipient, MVD Major General Vladimir Mikhaïlovich Maksimchuk
- MVD Major General Gasan Borisovich Mirzoev
- Hero of the Soviet Union Sergeant Ivan Fedorovich Zaitsev
- Professor Vladimir Fedorovich Popondopulo
- MVD Major General Anatoly Lavrent'evich Bakhvalov
- Admiral German Alexeyevich Ugryumov
- Politician Nikolai Semenovich Priezzhev
- Cossack General Evgenii Alekseevich Mel'nik
- MVD Army General Nicholaï Anisimovich Shchelokov
- MVD Fire Chief Igor Fotievich Kimstach
- Army General of Rocket Troops Yurii Alekseevich Yashin
- Major General Viktor Viktorovich Saf'yanov
- Ukrainian politician Dmytro Vladimirovich Tabachnyk

== See also ==
- Awards of the Ministry for Emergency Situations of Russia
- Awards of the Ministry of Internal Affairs of Russia
- Russian State Fire Service
- Awards and decorations of the Soviet Union
