= Medal "For Work in Agriculture" =

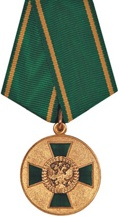
- Medal "For Work in Agriculture" (obverse)
- Type: State Decoration
- Awarded for: Achievements in the field of agriculture and major contributions to the development of the agro-industrial complex
- Presented by: Russian Federation
- Eligibility: Citizens of the Russian Federation
- Status: Active
- Established: March 10, 2004
- Ribbon of the Medal "For Work in Agriculture"

Precedence
- Next (higher): Medal For Life Saving
- Next (lower): Medal For the Development of Railways

The Medal "For Work in Agriculture" (Russian: Медаль «За труды по сельскому хозяйству») is a state decoration of the Russian Federation aimed at recognising merit and achievement within the agro-industrial complex.

== Award history ==
The Medal "For Work in Agriculture" was established by Presidential Decree № 335 of March 10, 2004. This decree detailed the medal's statute (award criteria) and appearance. Presidential decree № 1099 of September 7, 2010 amended the entire Russian awards system away from the distinctions of the Soviet Era, this included changes to this medal's statute.

== Award statute ==
The Medal "For Work in Agriculture" is awarded to citizens of the Russian Federation for achievements in the field of agriculture and major contributions to the development of the agro-industrial complex, in training, in research and in other activities aimed at improving the efficiency of agricultural production if previously awarded the honorary title of "Honoured Worker of Agriculture of the Russian Federation".

It may also be awarded to foreign nationals that produce agricultural products on the territory of the Russian Federation, for outstanding achievements in the development of the agro-industrial complex of the Russian Federation.

The order of precedence of the Russian Federation dictates that the Medal "For Work in Agriculture" is to be worn on the left breast with other medals and placed immediately after the Medal For Life Saving.

== Award description ==
The Medal "For Work in Agriculture" is a 32-millimetre-diameter silver-plated circular medal with raised rims on both the obverse and reverse. The obverse bears a cross pattée, its four arms enamelled in green, at its center a bare metal medallion bearing the relief State Emblem of the Russian Federation surrounded by a wreath of corn. On the otherwise plain reverse the inscription in relief "FOR WORK IN AGRICULTURE" (Russian: "ЗА ТРУДЫ ПО СЕЛЬСКОМУ ХОЗЯЙСТВУ"), below the inscription, "№" in relief with a horizontal line for the award serial number.

The medal is suspended by a ring through the award's suspension loop to a standard Russian pentagonal mount covered with a 24-millimetre-wide green silk moiré ribbon with 1.5 mm yellow stripes located 1.5 mm from the edges.

== Number of medals awarded ==
Below are the numbers of awards per year of the Medal "For Work in Agriculture" compiled from the site of the President of the Russian Federation:

2004	2005	2006	2007	2008	2009	2010	2011	Total
82	92	109	145	98	72	55	8	661

== See also ==
- List of orders, decorations, and medals of the Russian Federation
- Russian Ministry of Agriculture
