= Orders, decorations, and medals of Russia =

Coat of arms of Russia.

The State Award System of the Russian Federation has varied and distinct origins. The first being pre-1917 orders of the Russian Empire re-established after the 1991 dissolution of the Soviet Union, the second is from former Soviet orders that were slightly modified and retained post 1991, we also find many completely new awards resembling Imperial awards in basic design since the reintroduction of Russian heraldry.

Some of the Soviet awards, decorations, and orders were discontinued after the dissolution of the Soviet Union, while others are still issued by the Russian Federation as of 2021. Many of the awards were simply reworked in the Russian Federation, such as the transition of Hero of the Soviet Union to Hero of the Russian Federation, and Hero of Socialist Labour to Hero of Labour of the Russian Federation.

Originally set up following the dissolution of the Soviet Union by Decision of the Supreme Soviet of the Russian Federation No. 2557-I of March 20, 1992, the statutes of all state awards was later ratified in Presidential Decree No. 442 of March 2, 1994. The entire state awards' system of the Russian Federation was amended on September 7, 2010 by presidential decree No. 1099, this all encompassing decree distanced modern Russian awards from their Soviet roots. Presidential Decree No. 1631 of December 16, 2011 amended and finalized the order of precedence of all modern Russian awards. Awards can be revoked by the State Duma if the recipient is not deemed fit to receive the award.

== Honorary titles of the Russian Federation ==
Award	Name (English/Russian)	Presidential Decree	Inception or Amendment Date	Award Criteria
"Gold Star"	Hero of the Russian Federation Герой Российской Федерации Geroy Rossiyskoy Federatsii	No. 2553-l	1992-03-20	Awarded to those committing actions or deeds that involve conspicuous bravery while in the service of the state.
"Hero of Labour of the Russian Federation"	Hero of Labour of the Russian Federation Герой Труда Российской Федерации Geroy Truda Rossiyskoy Federatsii	No. 294	2013-03-29	Awarded for special labor services to the state and the people associated with the achievement of outstanding results in public, social and economic activities aimed at ensuring the welfare and prosperity of Russia.
"Mother Heroine"	Mother Heroine Мать-героиня Mat'-geroinya	No. 558	2022-08-15	Awarded to mothers who have given birth to ten or more children and raised them as part of a socially responsible family and with appropriate care for their health, education, and physical, spiritual, and moral development.
Pilot-Cosmonaut Of The Russian Federation	Pilot-Cosmonaut of the Russian Federation Летчик-космонавт Российской Федерации Letchik-kosmonavt Rossiyskoy Federatsii	No. 2555-l	1992-03-20	Awarded to all cosmonauts who have flown for the Russian space programme.
Honoured Military Pilot Of The Russian Federation	Honoured Military Pilot of the Russian Federation Заслуженный военный летчик Российской Федерации Zasluzhennyy voennyy letchik Rossiyskoy Federatsii	No. 2555-l	1992-03-20	Awarded for special merits in the development of aviation technology, high performance in education and training of flight personnel and a multi-year accident-free flying period in military aviation.
Honoured Military Navigator Of The Russian Federation	Honoured Military Navigator of the Russian Federation Заслуженный военный штурман Российской Федерации Zasluzhennyy voennyy shturman Rossiyskoy Federatsii	No. 2555-l	1992-03-20	Awarded for learning special and complicated flight technique and/or long period of flying planes without incident.

== Orders of the Russian Federation ==
Award	Name (English/Russian)	Presidential Decree	Inception or Amendment Date	Award Criteria
	Order of Saint Andrew the Apostle the First-Called Орден Святого апостола Андрея Первозванного Orden Svyatogo apostola Andreya Pervozvannogo	No. 757 - No. 1099 - No. 1631	1998-07-01 ---------- 2010-09-07 ---------- 2011-12-16	Awarded to prominent statesmen and public figures, eminent representatives of science, culture, the arts and various industries for exceptional services, for promoting the prosperity, grandeur and glory of Russia. May be awarded to foreign heads of states for outstanding service to the Russian Federation. For the military division of the Order, crossed swords are added below the crown above the two eagles' heads. On the reverse of the eagle on a white ribbon is the motto of the Order inscribed in gold letters «За веру и верность» («For faith and loyalty»).
	Order of Saint George; 1st Class Орден Святого Георгия; I степени Orden Svyatogo Georgiya; I stepeni	No. 1463 - No. 1099 - No. 1631	2000-08-08 ---------- 2010-09-07 ---------- 2011-12-16	Awarded to top and senior military officers, for the conduct of military operations to protect the Motherland in the case of attack by an external enemy which resulted in the complete defeat of the enemy, for the execution of combat and other operations in other states aimed at restoring international peace and security, for being a model of military science with feats that exemplify military prowess, who were previously awarded state awards of the Russian Federation for distinction in combat. It has four classes (I through IV, the first being the highest) awarded successively.
	Order of Saint George; 2nd Class Орден Святого Георгия; II степени Orden Svyatogo Georgiya; II stepeni	No. 1463 - No. 1099 - No. 1631	2000-08-08 ---------- 2010-09-07 ---------- 2011-12-16	Awarded to top and senior military officers, for the conduct of military operations to protect the Fatherland in the case of attack by an external enemy which resulted in the complete defeat of the enemy, for the execution of combat and other operations in other states aimed at restoring international peace and security, for being a model of military science with feats that exemplify military prowess, who were previously awarded state awards of the Russian Federation for distinction in combat. It has four classes (I through IV, the first being the highest) awarded successively.
	Order of Saint George; 3rd Class Орден Святого Георгия; III степени Orden Svyatogo Georgiya; III stepeni	No. 1463 - No. 1099 - No. 1631	2000-08-08 ---------- 2010-09-07 ---------- 2011-12-16	Awarded to top and senior military officers, for the conduct of military operations to protect the Fatherland in the case of attack by an external enemy which resulted in the complete defeat of the enemy, for the execution of combat and other operations in other states aimed at restoring international peace and security, for being a model of military science with feats that exemplify military prowess, who were previously awarded state awards of the Russian Federation for distinction in combat. It has four classes (I through IV, the first being the highest) awarded successively.
	Order of Saint George; 4th Class Орден Святого Георгия; IV степени Orden Svyatogo Georgiya; IV stepeni	No. 1463 - No. 1099 - No. 1631	2000-08-08 ---------- 2010-09-07 ---------- 2011-12-16	Awarded to top and senior military officers, for the conduct of military operations to protect the Fatherland in the case of attack by an external enemy which resulted in the complete defeat of the enemy, for the execution of combat and other operations in other states aimed at restoring international peace and security, for being a model of military science with feats that exemplify military prowess, who were previously awarded state awards of the Russian Federation for distinction in combat. The Order of Saint George 4th class may be awarded to junior officers who, in the course of fighting to protect the Fatherland, have displayed personal bravery, courage and valour, high military skills, resulting in victory. It has four classes (I through IV, the first being the highest) awarded successively.
	Order "For Merit to the Fatherland"; 1st Class Орден «За заслуги перед Отечеством» I степени Orden «Za zaslugi pered Otechestvom» I stepeni	No. 442 - No. 19 - No. 1099 - No. 1631	1994-03-02 ---------- 1999-01-06 ---------- 2010-09-07 ---------- 2011-12-16	The Order "For Merit to the Fatherland" is a mixed civilian and military order created in four classes. It is awarded for outstanding contributions to the state associated with the development of Russia's statehood, advances in labour, peace, friendship and cooperation between nations, or for significant contributions to the defence of the Fatherland.
	Order "For Merit to the Fatherland"; 2nd Class Орден «За заслуги перед Отечеством» II степени Orden «Za zaslugi pered Otechestvom» II stepeni	No. 442 - No. 19 - No. 1099 - No. 1631	1994-03-02 ---------- 1999-01-06 ---------- 2010-09-07 ---------- 2011-12-16	The Order "For Merit to the Fatherland" is a mixed civilian and military order created in four classes. It is awarded for outstanding contributions to the state associated with the development of Russia's statehood, advances in labour, peace, friendship and cooperation between nations, or for significant contributions to the defence of the Fatherland.
	Order "For Merit to the Fatherland"; 3rd Class Орден «За заслуги перед Отечеством» III степени Orden «Za zaslugi pered Otechestvom» III stepeni	No. 442 - No. 19 - No. 1099 - No. 1631	1994-03-02 ---------- 1999-01-06 ---------- 2010-09-07 ---------- 2011-12-16	The Order "For Merits for the Fatherland" is a mixed civilian and military order created in four classes. It is awarded for outstanding contributions to the state associated with the development of Russia's statehood, advances in labour, peace, friendship and cooperation between nations, or for significant contributions to the defence of the Fatherland.
	Order "For Merit to the Fatherland"; 4th Class Орден «За заслуги перед Отечеством» IV степени Orden «Za zaslugi pered Otechestvom» IV stepeni	No. 442 - No. 19 - No. 1099 - No. 1631	1994-03-02 ---------- 1999-01-06 ---------- 2010-09-07 ---------- 2011-12-16	The Order "For Merit for the Fatherland" is a mixed civilian and military order created in four classes. It is awarded for outstanding contributions to the state associated with the development of Russia's statehood, advances in labour, peace, friendship and cooperation between nations, or for significant contributions to the defence of the Fatherland.
	Order of Saint Catherine the Great Martyr Орден Святой великомученицы Екатерины Orden Svyatoy velikomuchenitsy Ekateriny	No. 573	2012-05-03	Awarded to Russian and foreign citizens well known for their high moral values and compassion for their outstanding contribution to peacekeeping, charity, humanitarian activities and the preservation of cultural heritage.
	Order of Gagarin Орден Гагарина Orden Gagarina	No. 385	2023-05-27	Awarded to Russian citizens for successful crewed spaceflight, crewed spaceflight programs for exploration, development, and utilization of space.
	Order for Valiant Labor Орден «За доблестный труд» Orden «Za doblestnyj trud»	No. 81	2024-02-01	Awarded for great achievements in labor (service) activities aimed at strengthening and developing the economic and defense potential of the Russian Federation; for highly productive work at enterprises, organizations and institutions, contributing to increasing the competitiveness of sectors of the Russian economy, as well as various types of products; for great achievements in the field of state construction, scientific and technological development of the Russian Federation and for the effective solution of socially significant problems.
	Order of Alexander Nevsky Орден Александра Невского Orden Aleksandra Nevskogo	No. 2424-I - No. 1099 - No. 1631	1992-03-2 ---------- 2010-09-07 ---------- 2011-12-16	Awarded to citizens of the Russian Federation, in civil service positions for 20 years or more, for special personal merit in nation-building, for many years of honest service and excellent results achieved while on duty, for strengthening the international authority of Russia, the country's defence, economic development, science, education, culture, the arts, health care and other services, as well as to other citizens of the Russian Federation if previously awarded a state Order, for outstanding personal achievements in various sectors of the economy, research, social, cultural, educational and other socially useful activities. May also be awarded to prominent foreign politicians, public figures or representatives of business communities of foreign states, for merit in the development of multilateral cooperation with the Russian Federation and to assist in its socio-economic development.
	Order of Suvorov Орден Суворова Orden Suvorova	No. 2424-I - No. 1099 - No. 1631	1992-03-02 ---------- 2010-09-07 ---------- 2011-12-16	Awarded to formation commanders, their deputies, heads of operational management, of operational departments, chief of the army and of special forces of the Armed Forces of the Russian Federation: for skilful organization of the operations and management of groups of troops (forces), formations and military units, who managed, despite the stubborn resistance of the enemy, its numerical superiority, better technical equipment and a more favourable location in the theatre of operations to achieve the goals of the operation to keep key areas of its territory (or territory of allied countries), to create conditions for seizing the initiative and conduct further operations with offensive purposes; for skilful organization and management of units of the Armed Forces of the Russian Federation during events of strategic deterrence, to ensure that no escalation, aggression (conflict) against the Russian Federation and (or) its allies occurs. May be awarded for conducting operations on land or in the air, during which, despite the numerical superiority of the enemy, the objectives of the operations were carried out while retaining the full operational capability of military units. May be awarded to foreign citizens – soldiers of allied forces among the senior officers involved alongside the soldiers of the Russian Federation in organizing and conducting a successful operation of allied troops (forces).
	Order of Ushakov Орден Ушакова Orden Ushakova	No. 2424-I - No. 1099 - No. 1631	1992-03-02 ---------- 2010-09-07 ---------- 2011-12-16	Awarded to command grade officers of formations and divisions of the Navy: for skilful organization and conduct of operations during naval combat during which, despite the numerical superiority of the enemy, the objectives of the operation were carried out; for skilful naval manoeuvres leading to the defeat of a superior enemy naval forces; for initiative and determination in choosing a place and time of application of the main attack which led to the defeat of the enemy enabling the preservation and combat readiness of forces (troops); for achievements in the destruction of the enemy fleet or shore facilities; for skilful organization causing a sudden and decisive blow to enemy forces based on interaction with other branches of the Armed Forces of the Russian Federation; for skilful organization in repelling enemy attacks from the sea enabling the preservation of the fighting ability of formations of forces (troops), of operational facilities on home territory, of the main ports of the fleet; for success in combined naval (air / sea), amphibious operations, which resulted in achieving its goals. May also be awarded to military units and formations of the Navy for participation in successful naval operations. May also be awarded to foreign citizens – soldiers of allied forces from among the senior officers involved along with troops of the Russian Federation for organizing and conducting successful joint operations of allied troops (forces).
Order Of Zhukov Type 1 (1994–2010)	Order of Zhukov Орден Жукова Orden Zhukova	No. 930 - No. 243 - No. 1099 - No. 1631	1994-05-09 ---------- 1995-03-06 ---------- 2010-09-07 ---------- 2011-12-16	Awarded to commanders of military units and their deputies from among the senior officers: for skillful organization of troops (forces) and operations in strategic areas (theatres), or military operations during which, despite the numerical superiority of the enemy, the objectives of the operation were met; for skillful manoeuvres on land and in the air to surround the enemy, enabling the defeat of superior forces; for initiative and determination in choosing a site and time of a main attack which led to the defeat of the enemy on land and/or in the air while maintaining the combat readiness and capability to prosecute; for carrying out a defensive breakout from an enemy encirclement to further the offensive, the organization of the prosecution, the environment and the defeat of the enemy; for tenacity in repelling enemy attacks from the air, land and sea, keeping enemy troops pinned down in designated areas of responsibility to create conditions favourable for seizing the initiative and depriving the enemy's ability to continue offensive operations; for skillful organization and management of units of the Armed Forces of the Russian Federation stationed outside the Russian Federation, for repelling an armed attack on them, as well as the protection from attack on citizens of the Russian Federation outside of the Russian Federation. May be awarded to military units and formations involved in conducting operations on land and in the air, during which, despite the stubborn resistance of the enemy, the objectives of the operations were met with full operational capability of military units retained. May also be awarded to foreign citizens – soldiers of allied forces from among the senior officers who took part along with soldiers of the Russian Federation in organizing and conducting successful joint operation of allied troops (forces).
	Order of Kutuzov Орден Кутузова Orden Kutuzova	No. 2424-1 - No. 1099 - No. 1631	1992-03-02 ---------- 2010-09-07 ---------- 2011-12-16	Awarded to commanders of military units and their deputies, as well as to commanders of battalions and companies: for skillful organization and conduct of operations during which, despite the numerical superiority of the enemy, the objectives of the operation were met; for tenacity in repelling enemy attacks from the air, land or sea, for retaining the combat readiness in designated areas of responsibility, for the creation of conditions for conducting subsequent operations with offensive purposes; for skillful organization and control of troops (forces), establishment of prepared defenses, maintaining close interaction between the troops (forces) involved in the operations, ensuring the defeat of the enemy or depth of damage inflicted depriving him the opportunity to continue its offensive; for skillful conduct of combat on land and/or in the air, surrounded by superior enemy forces, for the organization of a breakthrough with the withdrawal of troops from the area without significant loss of combat effectiveness; for the capture, with minor losses, of a major site of resistance, its communications, the defeat of his rear garrisons and bases, the capture and retaining of vital areas, repelling strong counterattacks by air, land and/or sea; for successful execution of combat missions, displaying personal courage leading to the destruction of critical enemy military facilities and equipment on land, air and sea. Can be awarded to military units that participated in operation, during which, despite the stubborn resistance of the enemy, the objectives were met with full operational capability of military units retained. May also be awarded to foreign citizens – soldiers of allied forces from among the officers who took part along with soldiers of the Russian Federation in organizing and conducting a successful operation of allied troops (forces).
	Order of Nakhimov Орден Нахимова Orden Nakhimova	No. 2424-1 - No. 1099 - No. 1631	1992-03-02 ---------- 2010-09-07 ---------- 2011-12-16	Awarded to officers of the Navy: for success in planning and conducting naval operations of combat formations (troops), which resulted in successfully repelling an enemy offensive by inflicting heavy losses; for having skillfully organized and conducted the operations of naval combat formations (troops) in cooperation with other services of the Armed Forces of the Russian Federation, which resulted in the defeat of superior enemy forces; for having skillfully organized and conducted a counterattack which resulted in the defeat of an enemy amphibious assault; for success in leadership of landings, for the successful execution of combat missions, displaying personal courage leading to the defeat of the units of the enemy fleet, for destroying it shore facilities, for disruption of enemy communications. May also be awarded to military units that participated in successful naval operations. May also be awarded to foreign citizens – soldiers of the allied forces from among the officers who took part along with soldiers of the Russian Federation in organizing and conducting successful joint operation of allied troops (forces).
	Order of Courage Орден Мужества Orden Muzhestva	No. 442 - No. 19 - No. 1099 - No. 1631	1994-03-02 ---------- 1999-01-06 ---------- 2010-09-07 ---------- 2011-12-16	Awarded to citizens of the Russian Federation who showed dedication, courage and bravery in protecting public order, fighting crime, in rescuing people during natural disasters, fires, accidents and other emergencies, as well as bold and decisive actions committed in the performance of military or civil duty under conditions involving a risk to life. May be awarded to foreign nationals who showed dedication, courage and bravery in the rescue of Russian citizens during natural disasters, fires, accidents and other emergencies outside the Russian Federation. May be made posthumously.
	Order "For Military Merit" Орден «За военные заслуги» Orden «Za voennye zaslugi»	No. 442 - No. 19 - No. 1099 - No. 1631	1994-03-02 ---------- 1999-01-06 ---------- 2010-09-07 ---------- 2011-12-16	Awarded to military personnel for exemplary performance in military duties, for high combat readiness in ensuring Russia's defense; for high personal performance for high personal performance in career and vocational training, courage and dedication shown during the performance of military duty in the course of combat or combat-training objectives; for bravery and courage shown in the performance of military duties; for merit in strengthening military cooperation with friendly nations.
	Order "For Naval Merit" Орден «За морские заслуги» Orden «Za morskie zaslugi»	No. 245 - No. 1099 - No. 1631	2002-02-27 ---------- 2010-09-07 ---------- 2011-12-16	Awarded to citizens of the Russian Federation: for achievements in the exploration, development and use of the oceans in the interest of national defense and ensuring its economic and social development; for achievements in the development and implementation of the latest technology and equipment for the Russian Navy; for services in maintaining, expanding, learning about and using the exclusive economic zone of the Russian Federation in the oceans; for achievements in the fight against illegal actions of pirates and poachers aimed at causing environmental, economic and damage to the reputation and interests of the Russian Federation in its exclusive economic zone on the oceans, as well as ships flying the national flag of the Russian Federation on the oceans; for skillful organization and conduct of naval exercises and manoeuvres, during which all tasks were fully carried out.
	Order of Honour Орден «Почёта» Orden Pochyota	No. 442 - No. 19 - No. 1099 - No. 1631	1994-03-02 ---------- 1999-01-06 ---------- 2010-09-07 ---------- 2011-12-16	Awarded to citizens of the Russian Federation: for high achievement in production and economic indicators in industry, construction, agriculture, communications, energy and transport, coupled with the predominant use of innovative technologies in the production process, for a significant increase in the level of socio-economic development of the Russian Federation; for achievements in modernizing the Russian health care system, aimed at significantly improving the quality of the provision of medical services, as well as the development and widespread practical applications of modern and innovative methods of diagnosing and treating diseases; for achievements in scientific research resulting in significant Russian scientific and technological advantage in various fields of science, increased domestic production of competitive high-tech products; for services to improve the Russian education system aimed at dramatically improving the quality of education provided, the system of training specialists for the Russian economy and increasing international prestige of Russian educational institutions; for significant contribution to the preservation, promotion and development of Russian culture, art, history and the Russian language, associated with increased levels of cultural and humanitarian development of civil and patriotic education of the younger generation; for very fruitful public, charitable and community activities; for merit in the promotion, and support of youth sports, as well as elite sport, considerably increasing the level of physical activity and to make Russia a World leader in individual sports.
	Order of Friendship Орден Дружбы Orden Druzhby	No. 442 - No. 19 - No. 1099 - No. 1631 - No. 308 - No. 433	1994-03-02 ---------- 1999-01-06 ---------- 2010-09-07 ---------- 2011-12-16 ---------- 2012-03-16 ---------- 2012-04-12	Awarded to citizens of the Russian Federation: for special merit in strengthening friendship and cooperation between peoples; for fruitful work in the rapprochement and mutual enrichment of cultures of nations and ethnicities; for assistance in strengthening peace and friendly relations among nations; for outstanding work in the conservation, augmentation and promotion of cultural and historical heritage of Russia; for successful achievements and great labour, for broad charitable activities. Can be awarded to citizens and foreigners for outstanding achievements in the popularization of Russian culture and arts, as well as in promoting inter-state cultural exchanges with the Russian Federation.
	Order of Parental Glory Орден «Родительская слава» Orden «Roditel'skaya slava»	No. 775 - No. 1099 - No. 1631	2008-05-13 ---------- 2010-09-07 ---------- 2011-12-16	Awarded to parents or adoptive parents who are married, in a civil union, or in the case of single-parent families, to one of the parents or adoptive parents who are/is raising, or have raised seven or more children as citizens of the Russian Federation. For leading a healthy family life, being socially responsible, providing an adequate level of health care, education, physical, spiritual and moral development of the children, full and harmonious development of their personality, and setting an example to strengthen the institution of the family and child rearing.

== State decorations of the Russian Federation ==
Award	Name (English/Russian)	Presidential Decree	Inception or Amendment Date	Award Criteria
	"Cross of St. George"; 1st Class Знак отличия — Георгиевский Крест; I степени Znak otlichiya — Georgievskiy Krest; I stepeni	No. 2557-l - No. 1463 - No. 1099	1992-03-20 ---------- 2000-08-08 ---------- 2010-09-07	Awarded to soldiers, sailors, sergeants, petty officers, warrant officers and junior officers for deeds and distinction in battle in defense of the Motherland, as well as for deeds and distinction in battle on the territory of other states while maintaining or restoring international peace and security with recognized instances of courage, dedication and military skill. Awarded sequentially in four classes.
	"Cross of St. George"; 2nd Class Знак отличия — Георгиевский Крест; II степени Znak otlichiya — Georgievskiy Krest; II stepeni	No. 2557-l - No. 1463 - No. 1099	1992-03-20 ---------- 2000-08-08 ---------- 2010-09-07	Awarded to soldiers, sailors, sergeants, petty officers, warrant officers and junior officers for deeds and distinction in battle in defense of the Motherland, as well as for deeds and distinction in battle on the territory of other states while maintaining or restoring international peace and security with recognized instances of courage, dedication and military skill. Awarded sequentially in four classes.
	"Cross of St. George"; 3rd Class Знак отличия — Георгиевский Крест; III степени Znak otlichiya — Georgievskiy Krest; III stepeni	No. 2557-l - No. 1463 - No. 1099	1992-03-20 ---------- 2000-08-08 ---------- 2010-09-07	Awarded to soldiers, sailors, sergeants, petty officers, warrant officers and junior officers for deeds and distinction in battle in defense of the Motherland, as well as for deeds and distinction in battle on the territory of other states while maintaining or restoring international peace and security with recognized instances of courage, dedication and military skill. Awarded sequentially in four classes.
	"Cross of St. George"; 4th Class Знак отличия — Георгиевский Крест; IV степени Znak otlichiya — Georgievskiy Krest; IV stepeni	No. 2557-l - No. 1463 - No. 1099	1992-03-20 ---------- 2000-08-08 ---------- 2010-09-07	Awarded to soldiers, sailors, sergeants, petty officers, warrant officers and junior officers for deeds and distinction in battle in defense of the Motherland, as well as for deeds and distinction in battle on the territory of other states while maintaining or restoring international peace and security with recognized instances of courage, dedication and military skill. Awarded sequentially in four classes.
	Decoration "For Beneficence" Знак отличия «За благодеяние» Znak otlichiya «Za blagodeyanie»	No. 573	2012-05-03	Awarded to Russian and foreign nationals for major charity efforts to support children's homes, nursing homes, orphanages, hospices and medical facilities in Russia; active public work aimed at improving the level of morality and tolerance in society, promoting human values and human rights, and combating the spread of dangerous diseases and habits; the contribution to the development of Russian science, culture, education and healthcare; assistance to NGOs and religious organisations in implementing socially significant measures; activities aimed at strengthening the institution of marriage and family.
	Decoration "For Impeccable Service"; 50 Years; Знак отличия «За безупречную службу» L лет Znak otlichiya «Za bezulprechnuyu sluzhbu» L let	No. 442 - No. 1099	1994-03-02 ---------- 2010-09-07	Awarded to civilians for impeccable service to the state. The civilian award has the ribbon of the Order "For Service to the Fatherland".
	Decoration "For Impeccable Service"; 40 Years; Знак отличия «За безупречную службу» XL лет Znak otlichiya «Za bezulprechnuyu sluzhbu» XL let	No. 442 - No. 1099	1994-03-02 ---------- 2010-09-07	Awarded to civilians for impeccable service to the state. The civilian award has the ribbon of the Order "For Service to the Fatherland".
	Decoration "For Impeccable Service"; 30 Years; Знак отличия «За безупречную службу» XXX лет Znak otlichiya «Za bezulprechnuyu sluzhbu» XXX let	No. 442 - No. 1099	1994-03-02 ---------- 2010-09-07	Awarded to military personnel and civilians for impeccable service to the state. The civilian award has the ribbon of the Order "For Service to the Fatherland" and the military variation has the ribbon of the Order of Saint George.
Military Version	Decoration "For Impeccable Service"; 25 Years; Знак отличия «За безупречную службу» XXV лет Znak otlichiya «Za bezulprechnuyu sluzhbu» XXV let	No. 442 - No. 1099	1994-03-02 ---------- 2010-09-07	Awarded to military personnel and civilians for impeccable service to the state. The civilian award has the ribbon of the Order "For Service to the Fatherland" and the military variation has the ribbon of the Order of Saint George.
	Decoration "For Impeccable Service"; 20 Years; Знак отличия «За безупречную службу» XX лет Znak otlichiya «Za bezulprechnuyu sluzhbu» XX let	No. 442 - No. 1099	1994-03-02 ---------- 2010-09-07	Awarded to military personnel and civilians for impeccable service to the state. The civilian award has the ribbon of the Order "For Service to the Fatherland" and the military variation has the ribbon of the Order of Saint George.
	Decoration "For Impeccable Service"; 15 Years; Знак отличия «За безупречную службу» XV лет Znak otlichiya «Za bezulprechnuyu sluzhbu» XV let	No. 442 - No. 1099	1994-03-02 ---------- 2010-09-07	Awarded to military personnel for impeccable service to the state. The military variation has the ribbon of the Order of Saint George.

== Medals of the Russian Federation ==
Award	Name (English/Russian)	Presidential Decree	Inception or Amendment Date	Award Criteria
	Medal of the Order "For Merit to the Fatherland" 1st Class Медаль ордена «За заслуги перед Отечеством» I степени Medal' ordena «Za zaslugi pered Otechestvom» I stepeni	No. 442 - No. 19 - No. 1099 - No. 1631	1994-03-02 ---------- 1999-01-06 ---------- 2010-09-07 ---------- 2011-12-16	Awarded to citizens of the Russian Federation for outstanding achievements in various fields of industry, construction, science, education, health, culture, transport and other areas of work.
	Medal of the Order "For Merit to the Fatherland" 1st Class with Swords Медаль ордена «За заслуги перед Отечеством» I степени с мечами Medal' ordena «Za zaslugi pered Otechestvom» I stepeni s mechami	No. 442 - No. 19 - No. 1099 - No. 1631	1994-03-02 ---------- 1999-01-06 ---------- 2010-09-07 ---------- 2011-12-16	Awarded to members of the Armed Forces of the Russian Federation for great contribution to the defense of the Fatherland, for success in maintaining the high combat readiness of the central organs of military administration, of military units and organizations, for strengthening the rule of law and order, for ensuring public safety.
	Medal of the Order "For Merit to the Fatherland" 2nd Class Медаль ордена «За заслуги перед Отечеством» II степени Medal' ordena «Za zaslugi pered Otechestvom» II stepeni	No. 442 - No. 19 - No. 1099 - No. 1631	1994-03-02 ---------- 1999-01-06 ---------- 2010-09-07 ---------- 2011-12-16	Awarded to citizens of the Russian Federation for outstanding achievements in various fields of industry, construction, science, education, health, culture, transport and other areas of work.
	Medal of the Order "For Merit to the Fatherland" 2nd Class with Swords Медаль ордена «За заслуги перед Отечеством» II степени с мечами Medal' ordena «Za zaslugi pered Otechestvom» II stepeni s mechami	No. 442 - No. 19 - No. 1099 - No. 1631	1994-03-02 ---------- 1999-01-06 ---------- 2010-09-07 ---------- 2011-12-16	Awarded to members of the Armed Forces of the Russian Federation for great contribution to the defence of the Fatherland, for success in maintaining the high combat readiness of the central organs of military administration, of military units and organizations, for strengthening the rule of law and order, for ensuring public safety.
	Medal "For Courage" Медаль «За отвагу» Medal' «Za otvagu»	No. 442 - No. 19 - No. 444 - No. 1099 - No. 1631	1994-03-02 ---------- 1999-01-06 ---------- 2003-04-17 ---------- 2010-09-07 ---------- 2011-12-16	Awarded to military personnel as well as to employees of the Interior Ministry of the Russian Federation, of the State Fire Service of the Russian Ministry for Civil Defence, Emergency Situations and Disaster Relief and other citizens for personal courage and bravery displayed: in combat in defence of the Fatherland and of the public interests of the Russian Federation; when performing special assignments to ensure the public safety of the Russian Federation; while protecting the state border of the Russian Federation; in the performance of military, official or civil duty while protecting the constitutional rights of citizens and in other circumstances involving a risk to life.
	Medal of Suvorov Медаль Суворова Medal' Suvorova	No. 442 - No. 19 - No. 1099 - No. 1631	1994-03-02 ---------- 1999-01-06 ---------- 2010-09-07 ---------- 2011-12-16	Awarded to soldiers for bravery and courage displayed during ground operations in the defence of the Fatherland and of the public interests of the Russian Federation, during the performance of combat service and combat duty, during exercises or manoeuvres, while on duty for the protection of the state borders of the Russian Federation, as well as for excellent performance in combat training and in maintaining military preparedness.
	Medal of Ushakov Медаль Ушакова Medal' Ushakova	No. 442 - No. 19 - No. 444 - No. 1099 - No. 1631	1994-03-02 ---------- 1999-01-06 ---------- 2003-04-17 ---------- 2010-09-07 ---------- 2011-12-16	Awarded to soldiers and sailors of the Navy and of the Border Guard Service of the Federal Security Service of the Russian Federation for bravery and courage displayed while defending the Fatherland and the public interests of the Russian Federation in naval theatres of military operations, while protecting the state border of the Russian Federation, in carrying out naval combat missions with vessels of the Navy and/or Border Guard Service of the Federal Security Service of the Russian Federation, during exercises and manoeuvres in the performance of military duty under conditions involving a risk to life, as well as for excellent performance in naval combat training.
	Medal of Zhukov Медаль Жукова Medal' Zhukova	No. 930 - No. 1334 - No. 1099 - No. 1631	1994-05-09 ---------- 1995-12-30 ---------- 2010-09-07 ---------- 2011-12-16	Awarded to soldiers for bravery, selflessness and personal courage in fighting for the protection of the Fatherland and the public interests of the Russian Federation, for distinction in military bearing in service, for alertness and active participation in exercises and manoeuvres, for excellent performance in combat training.
	Medal of Nesterov Медаль Нестерова Medal' Nesterova	No. 442 - No. 19 - No. 444 - No. 1099 - No. 1631	1994-03-02 ---------- 1999-01-06 ---------- 2003-04-17 ---------- 2010-09-07 ---------- 2011-12-16	Awarded to soldiers of the Air Force, of other air arms of the Armed Forces of the Russian Federation, of the Federal Security Service of the Russian Federation and to troops of the Ministry of Internal Affairs of the Russian Federation, to aircrews of civil aviation and of the aviation industry for bravery and personal courage displayed in defending the Fatherland and state interests of the Russian Federation, during the performance of combat duty, in exercises and manoeuvres; for excellent performance in combat training and in maintaining readiness of aerial assets, for special merit in the development, operation and maintenance of aircraft, professional excellence in piloting skills, for excellent performance in combat training and air combat training.
	Medal of Pushkin Медаль Пушкина Medal' Pushkina	No. 574 - No. 1099 - No. 1631	1999-05-09 ---------- 2010-09-07 ---------- 2011-12-16	Awarded to citizens of the Russian Federation with at least 20 years in socio-humanitarian activities for achievements in the arts and culture, education, humanities and literature, for great contribution to the study and preservation of our cultural heritage, in the rapprochement and mutual enrichment of cultures of nations and peoples, for the creation of highly artistic images.
	Medal "Defender of a Free Russia" Медаль «Защитнику свободной России» Medal' «Zashchitniku svobodnoy Rossii»	No. 3183-1 - No. 1631	1992-07-02 ---------- 2011-12-16	Conferred to the people who supported the democratic rule during the attempted coup d'état of August 19–21, 1991; in particular to those who defended the Russian parliament at that time. And since then for achievements in implementing democratic reforms, economic and political reforms, in strengthening Russian statehood.
	Medal "For Distinction in the Protection of Public Order" Медаль «За отличие в охране общественного порядка» Medal' «Za otlichie v okhrane obshchestvennogo poryadka»	No. 442 - No. 19 - No. 1099 - No. 1631	1994-03-02 ---------- 1999-01-06 ---------- 2010-09-07 ---------- 2011-12-16	Awarded to employees of the Interior Ministry of the Russian Federation, to soldiers of internal troops of the Ministry of Internal Affairs of the Russian Federation, to other troops for courage and bravery displayed while maintaining public order and combating crime, for high performance in service, as well as to other citizens for their assistance to the Interior Ministry of the Russian Federation in their efforts to protect public order.
	Medal "For Distinction in the Protection of the State Borders" Медаль «За отличие в охране государственной границы» Medal' «Za otlichie v okhrane gosudarstvennoy granitsy»	No. 442 - No. 19 - No. 444 - No. 1099 - No. 1631	1994-03-02 ---------- 1999-01-06 ---------- 2003-04-17 ---------- 2010-09-07 ---------- 2011-12-16	Awarded to soldiers of the Federal Security Service, as well as to other citizens: for combat exploits and special services rendered in the protection of the state borders of the Russian Federation; for bravery and dedication displayed in combat operations during the arrest of violators of the state borders of the Russian Federation; for leadership in protecting the integrity of the state borders of the Russian Federation; for displaying a high degree of vigilance and proactive actions which resulted in the arrest of violators of the state borders of the Russian Federation; for the excellent performance of duties in the protection of the state borders of Russia, for active assistance to the Federal Security Service in its efforts to protect the state borders of the Russian Federation.
	Medal "For Life Saving" Медаль «За спасение погибавших» Medal' «Za spasenie pogibavshikh»	No. 442 - No. 554 - No. 19 - No. 1099 - No. 1631	1994-03-02 ---------- 1995-06-01 ---------- 1999-01-06 ---------- 2010-09-07 ---------- 2011-12-16	Awarded to citizens for rescuing people during natural disasters, on water, under ground, in fire-fighting and other circumstances involving a risk to life.
	Medal "For Work in Agriculture" Медаль «За труды по сельскому хозяйству» Medal' «Za trudy po sel'skomu khozyaystvu»	No. 335 - No. 1099 - No. 1631	2004-03-10 ---------- 2010-09-07 ---------- 2011-12-16	Awarded to citizens of the Russian Federation for achievements in the field of agriculture and major contributions to the development of the agro-industrial complex, in training, in research and in other activities aimed at improving the efficiency of agricultural production if previously awarded the honorary title of "Honoured Worker of Agriculture of the Russian Federation." May also be awarded to foreign nationals that produce agricultural products on the territory of the Russian Federation, for outstanding achievements in the development of the agro-industrial complex of the Russian Federation.
	Medal "For the Development of Railways" Медаль «За развитие железных дорог» Medal' «Za razvitie zheleznykh dorog»	No. 852 - No. 1099 - No. 1631	2007-07-09 ---------- 2010-09-07 ---------- 2011-12-16	Awarded to citizens previously awarded the honorary title of "Honoured Worker of Transport of the Russian Federation" for contribution to the development of railways in the Russian Federation and for great contribution in training, research and other activities aimed at improving its efficiency. May also be awarded to foreign citizens for outstanding achievements in the development of rail transport in the Russian Federation.
	Medal "For Merit in the Development of Nuclear Energy" Медаль «За заслуги в освоении атомной энергии» Medal' «Za zaslugi v osvoenii atomnoy energii»	No. 133	2015-03-16	Awarded to citizens of the Russian Federation for achievements in the field of research, development and use of nuclear energy, for great contributions in nuclear and radiation safety, in training, in research and design activities, and for other achievements in the development of atomic energy aimed at a comprehensive socio-economic development of the Russian Federation, for strengthening its defence capability and ensuring national interests, for the expansion of international cooperation. May also be awarded to foreign nationals for outstanding achievements in the development of the nuclear industry of the Russian Federation.
	Medal "For Merit in Space Exploration" Медаль «За заслуги в освоении космоса» Medal' «Za zaslugi v osvoenii kosmosa»	No. 1099 - No. 1631	2010-09-07 ---------- 2011-12-16	Awarded to citizens for achievements in research, development and use of outer space, for extensive contribution to the development of rockets and space technology and industry, for training, for research and design activities, for the implementation of international programs as well as for other achievements in space activities aimed at the comprehensive socio-economic benefit of the Russian Federation, for strengthening its defence and in support of national interests, for increasing international cooperation. May also be awarded to foreign citizens for outstanding achievements in the development of the space industry in the Russian Federation.
	Medal of the Order of Parental Glory Медаль ордена «Родительская слава» Medal' ordena «Roditel'skaya slava»	No. 1099 - No. 1631	2010-09-07 ---------- 2011-12-16	Awarded to parents or adoptive parents who are married, in a civil union, or in the case of single-parent families, to one of the parents or adoptive parents who are/is raising, or have raised four or more children as citizens of the Russian Federation. For leading a healthy family life, being socially responsible, providing an adequate level of health care, education, physical, spiritual and moral development of the children, full and harmonious development of their personality, and setting an example to strengthen the institution of the family and child rearing.
	Medal "For Merit in the Conduct of the All-Russian Population Census" Медаль «За заслуги в проведении Всероссийской переписи населения» Medal' «Za zaslugi v provedenii Vserossiyskoy perepisi naseleniya»	No. 1151 - No. 1099	2002-10-14 ---------- 2010-09-07	Awarded to citizens who have made a significant contribution to the preparation and execution of the national census. Presidential decree No. 1099 of September 7, 2010 removed it from the list of Russian Federation awards, it is no longer awarded.

== State commemorative medals of the Russian Federation ==
NOTE: Presidential Decree No. 1099 of September 7, 2010, states the following: "In order to improve the state award system of the Russian Federation that commemorative medals of the Russian Federation, awards established by federal authorities and other federal government agencies, public authorities of the Russian Federation, public and religious associations were not state awards of the Russian Federation". This serves to clarify who can be recommended for the higher state awards of the Russian Federation, many of them requiring the previous award of lower state awards to be eligible. Commemorative awards and ministerial or departmental awards do not qualify as such.

Award	Name (English/Russian)	Presidential Decree	Inception or Amendment Date	Award Criteria
	Jubilee Medal "50 Years of Victory in the Great Patriotic War 1941–1945" Юбилейная медаль «50 лет Победы в Великой Отечественной войне 1941–1945 гг.» Yubileynaya medal' «50 let Pobedy v Velikoy Otechestvennoy voyne 1941–1945 gg.»	No. 296 - No. 1099	1995-03-22 ---------- 2010-09-07	Awarded to veterans of the Armed Forces of the USSR who participated in the fighting in the Great Patriotic War, guerrillas, the Underground, those awarded the Medal for victory over Germany in the Great Patriotic War of 1941–1945 or For the Victory over Japan. Wartime workers who were decorated for their dedicated work during the Great Patriotic War. Veterans of the Soviet Armed Forces and the Armed Forces of the Russian Federation. This medal was issued by all the governments of the Commonwealth of Independent States. Presidential decree No. 1099 of July 7, 2010 removed it from the list of Russian Federation awards, it is no longer awarded.
	Jubilee Medal "60 Years of Victory in the Great Patriotic War 1941–1945" Юбилейная медаль «60 лет Победы в Великой Отечественной войне 1941–1945 гг.» Yubileynaya medal' «60 let Pobedy v Velikoy Otechestvennoy voyne 1941–1945 gg.»	No. 277 - No. 533-rp - No. 1099	2004-02-28 ---------- 2004-11-10 ---------- 2010-09-07	Awarded to veterans of the Armed Forces of the USSR who participated in the fighting in the Great Patriotic War, guerrillas, the Underground, those awarded the Medal for victory over Germany in the Great Patriotic War of 1941–1945 or For the Victory over Japan. Wartime workers who were decorated for their dedicated work during the Great Patriotic War. Veterans of the Soviet Armed Forces and the Armed Forces of the Russian Federation. Presidential decree No. 1099 of July 7, 2010 removed it from the list of Russian Federation awards, it is no longer awarded.
	Jubilee Medal "65 Years of Victory in the Great Patriotic War 1941–1945" Юбилейная медаль «65 лет Победы в Великой Отечественной войне 1941–1945 гг.» Yubileynaya medal' «65 let Pobedy v Velikoy Otechestvennoy voyne 1941–1945 gg.»	No. 238 - No. 1099	2009-03-04 ---------- 2010-09-07	Awarded to soldiers and civilian employees of the Armed Forces of the USSR for participation in hostilities in the Great Patriotic War 1941–1945, guerrillas and members of underground organisations operating in occupied territories of the USSR, persons who were awarded the medal "For Victory over Germany" or "For Victory over Japan”, persons awarded for their selfless work the medal "For Valiant Labour in the Great Patriotic War” or "For Labour Merit" or any of the "Defence" medals of the cities or regions of the USSR; to persons who worked in the period from 22 June 1941 to May 9, 1945 for no less than six months, excluding the period of work in the temporarily occupied territories; former under-age prisoners of concentration camps, ghettos and other places of detention established by the Nazis and their allies; foreign nationals from outside the Commonwealth of Independent States, who fought in the national military forces in the USSR, as part of guerilla units, underground groups, and other anti-fascist groups who have made significant contribution to victory in the Patriotic War and who were awarded state awards of the USSR or Russian Federation. Presidential decree No. 1099 of July 7, 2010 removed it from the list of Russian Federation awards, it is no longer awarded.
	Jubilee Medal "70 Years of Victory in the Great Patriotic War 1941–1945" Юбилейная медаль «70 лет Победы в Великой Отечественной войне 1941–1945 гг.» Yubileynaya medal' «70 let Pobedy v Velikoy Otechestvennoy voyne 1941–1945 gg.»	No. 931 - No. 175-rp	2013-12-21 ---------- 2014-06-04	Awarded to soldiers and civilian employees of the Armed Forces of the USSR for participation in hostilities in the Great Patriotic War 1941–1945, guerrillas and members of underground organisations operating in occupied territories of the USSR, persons who were awarded the medal "For Victory over Germany" or "For Victory over Japan”, persons awarded for their selfless work the medal "For Valiant Labour in the Great Patriotic War” or "For Labour Merit" or any of the "Defence" medals of the cities or regions of the USSR; to persons who worked in the period from 22 June 1941 to May 9, 1945 for no less than six months, excluding the period of work in the temporarily occupied territories; former under-age prisoners of concentration camps, ghettos and other places of detention established by the Nazis and their allies; foreign nationals from outside the Commonwealth of Independent States, who fought in the national military forces in the USSR, as part of guerilla units, underground groups, and other anti-fascist groups who have made significant contribution to victory in the Patriotic War and who were awarded state awards of the USSR or Russian Federation.
	Jubilee Medal "75 Years of Victory in the Great Patriotic War 1941–1945" Юбилейная медаль «75 лет Победы в Великой Отечественной войне 1941–1945 гг.» Yubileynaya medal' «75 let Pobedy v Velikoy Otchestvennoy voyne 1941–1945 gg.»	No. 277	2019-06-13	Awarded to soldiers and civilian employees of the Armed Forces of the USSR for participation in hostilities in the Great Patriotic War 1941–1945, guerrillas and members of underground organisations operating in occupied territories of the USSR, persons who were awarded the medal "For Victory over Germany" or "For Victory over Japan”, persons awarded for their selfless work the medal "For Valiant Labour in the Great Patriotic War” or "For Labour Merit" or any of the "Defence" medals of the cities or regions of the USSR; to persons who worked in the period from 22 June 1941 to May 9, 1945 for no less than six months, excluding the period of work in the temporarily occupied territories; former under-age prisoners of concentration camps, ghettos and other places of detention established by the Nazis and their allies; foreign nationals from outside the Commonwealth of Independent States, who fought in the national military forces in the USSR, as part of guerilla units, underground groups, and other anti-fascist groups who have made significant contribution to victory in the Patriotic War and who were awarded state awards of the USSR or Russian Federation.
	Jubilee Medal "300 Years of the Russian Navy" Юбилейная медаль «300 лет Российскому флоту» Yubileynaya medal' «300 let Rossiyskomu flotu»	No. 176 - No. 304-rp - No. 1099	1996-02-10 ---------- 1996-06-07 ---------- 2010-09-07	Awarded for naval service if previously decorated with a state award and faultless service on ships or as part of a Naval Aviation crew for 10 years, or in other parts of the navy for 20 years, to naval veterans of the Great Patriotic War, naval researchers and members of expeditionary fleets who were awarded state awards and worked flawlessly for 15 years or more, designers, developers, managers of design offices, research institutions and organisations, educational institutions, heads of the central government shipbuilding industries, any major professions directly involved in the construction and repair of ships and vessels, heads of research institutes, marine academic institutions, who were awarded state awards and worked flawlessly for more than 20 years. Presidential decree No. 1099 of July 7, 2010 removed it from the list of Russian Federation awards, it is no longer awarded.
	Medal "In Commemoration of the 850th Anniversary of Moscow" Медаль «В память 850-летия Москвы» Medal' «V pamyat' 850-letiya Moskvy»	No. 132 - No. 1099	1997-02-26 ---------- 2010-09-07	Awarded to participants in the defence of Moscow who were awarded a medal for the defence of Moscow, wartime workers who worked in Moscow during the Great Patriotic War of 1941–1945, persons who were awarded the medal "In Commemoration of the 800th Anniversary of Moscow"; citizens who have made a significant contribution to the development of Moscow. Presidential decree No. 1099 of July 7, 2010 removed it from the list of Russian Federation awards, it is no longer awarded.
	Jubilee Medal "100 Years of the Trans-Siberian Railway" Юбилейная медаль «100 лет Транссибирской магистрали» Yubileynaya medal' «100 let Transsibirskoy magistrali»	No. 777 - No. 1099	2001-07-27 ---------- 2010-09-07	Awarded to employees of the railways who worked flawlessly in the industry for 20 years or more, as well as other citizens who have made a significant contribution to the development of the Trans-Siberian railway. Presidential decree No. 1099 of July 7, 2010 removed it from the list of Russian Federation awards, it is no longer awarded.
	Medal "In Commemoration of the 300th Anniversary of Saint Petersburg" Медаль «В память 300-летия Санкт-Петербурга» Medal' «V pamyat' 300-letiya Sankt-Peterburga»	No. 210 - No. 1099	2003-02-19 ---------- 2010-09-07	Awarded to participants of the wartime defence of Leningrad, persons awarded a medal for the defence of Leningrad; residents who were blockaded in Leningrad; wartime workers who worked during the Great Patriotic War of 1941–1945 years in Leningrad and awarded state awards; citizens who have made a significant contribution to the development of St. Petersburg. Presidential decree No. 1099 of July 7, 2010 removed it from the list of Russian Federation awards, it is no longer awarded.
	Medal "In Commemoration of the 1000th Anniversary of Kazan" Медаль «В память 1000-летия Казани» Medal' «V pamyat' 1000-letiya Kazani»	No. 762 - No. 1099	2005-06-30 ---------- 2010-09-07	Awarded to Kazan residents who fought in the Great Patriotic War of 1941–1945, wartime workers who worked during the Great Patriotic War of 1941–1945 in the city of Kazan for at least six months or that were awarded orders and medals of the Soviet Union for their dedicated work in the Great Patriotic War of 1941–1945, veterans of labour; citizens who have made a significant contribution to the development of the city of Kazan. Presidential decree No. 1099 of July 7, 2010 removed it from the list of Russian Federation awards, it is no longer awarded.

== Russian dynastic orders ==
Imperial dynastic orders of the House of Romanov. Defunct since Soviet Union; conferred in exile.

- Order of St. Andrew
- Order of Saint Catherine
- Order of Saint Alexander Nevsky
- Order of the White Eagle
- Order of Saint Vladimir
- Order of Saint Anna
- Order of Saint Nicholas the Wonderworker
- Order of Saint Anastasia
- Order of Saint Stanislaus
- Order of Saint Michael the Archangel
- (Insignia of Saint Olga)

== See also ==
- Ministerial awards of the Russian Federation
- List of awards of independent services of the Russian Federation
- Awards and emblems of the Ministry of Defence of the Russian Federation
- Awards of the Ministry for Emergency Situations of Russia
- Awards of the Ministry of Internal Affairs of Russia
- Awards of the Federal Border Service of the Russian Federation
- Awards of the Federal Protective Service of the Russian Federation
- Awards of the Federal Security Service of the Russian Federation
- Honorary titles of Russia
- List of Heroes of the Russian Federation
- Orders, decorations, and medals of the Soviet Union
- Honorary weapons of Russia
- List of "Umalatova" awards
- Russian nobility
