= Medal "For Merit in the Development of Nuclear Energy" =

Medal "For Merit in the Development of Atomic Energy"
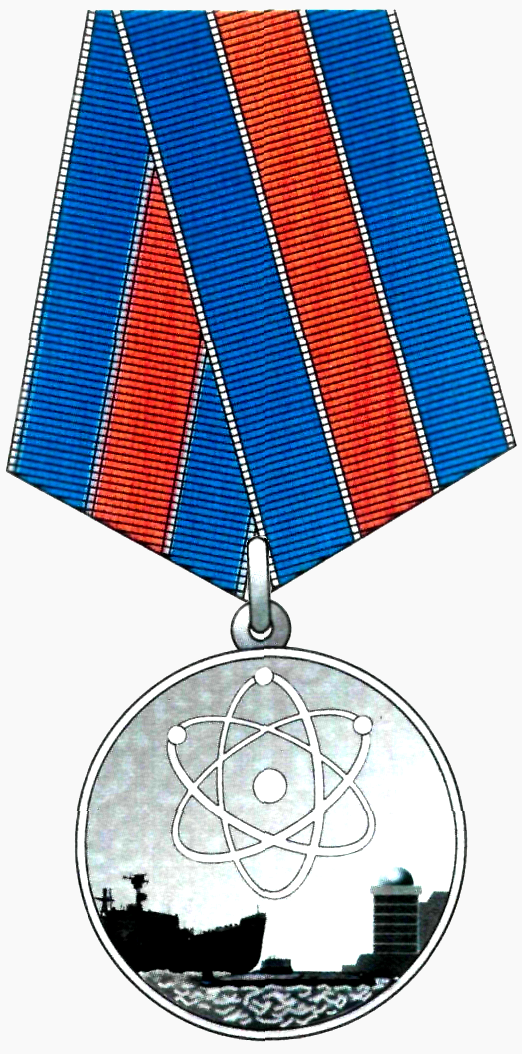
- Medal "For Merit in the Development of Atomic Energy" (obverse)
- Type: State Decoration
- Awarded for: Achievements in the development of Russian atomic energy
- Presented by: Russian Federation
- Eligibility: Russian citizens and foreign nationals
- Status: Active
- Established: March 16, 2015
- Ribbon of the Medal "For Merit in the Development of Atomic Energy"

Precedence
- Next (higher): Medal "For the Development of Railways"
- Next (lower): Medal For Merit in Space Exploration

The Medal "For Merit in the Development of Atomic Energy" (Russian: Медаль «За заслуги в освоении атомной энергии») is a state decoration of the Russian Federation aimed at recognising achievements in the nuclear industry. It was established by presidential decree №133 on March 16, 2015, marking the 70th anniversary of the Russian nuclear industry. The decree also established the title "Honored Worker of the Nuclear Industry of the Russian Federation."

== Award statute ==
The Medal "For Merit in the Development of Nuclear Energy" is awarded to citizens of the Russian Federation for achievements in the field of research, development, and use of nuclear energy, for contributions in nuclear safety and training, and for other achievements in the development of Russian atomic energy, defensive capabilities, national interests, and international cooperation. Foreign nationals may also receive the medal for contributions to the development of the nuclear industry of the Russian Federation.

The Russian Federation Order of Precedence dictates the Medal "For Merit in the Development of Nuclear Energy" is to be worn on the left breast with other medals immediately after the Medal For the Development of Railways.

== Award description ==
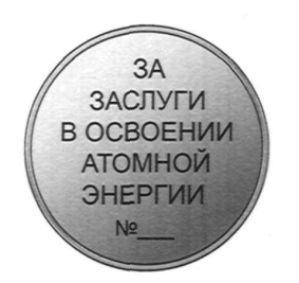
Reverse of the medal "For Merit in the Development of Nuclear Energy"

The Medal "For Merit in the Development of Nuclear Energy" is a 32-millimetre-diameter silver-plated circular medal with raised rims on both the obverse and reverse. The obverse bears the symbol of the atom, above images of a nuclear icebreaker, nuclear submarine, and nuclear power plant. On the reverse is the inscription "For Merit in the Development of Nuclear Energy" (Russian: «ЗА ЗАСЛУГИ В ОСВОЕНИИ АТОМНОЙ ЭНЕРГИИ»), with the letters "№" and the award serial number in relief below the inscription.

The medal is suspended by a ring through the award's suspension loop to a standard Russian pentagonal mount covered with a silk moire ribbon measuring 24 mm in width. The ribbon is split into three equal stripes, a red one in the middle with bright blue on each side, and there are 1 mm white stripes between the stripes and along the ribbon edges.

There is also a ribbon version of the medal with a bar measuring 24 mm in width and 8 mm in height, with the same color scheme as the ribbon used on the medal itself.

== See also ==
- Awards and decorations of the Russian Federation
- Kurchatov Medal: Russian nuclear physics award
