= Decoration For Impeccable Service =

Award of the Russian Federation

Decoration "For Impeccable Service"
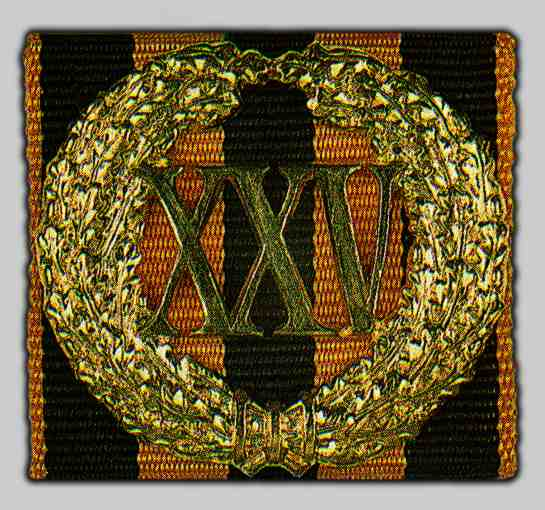
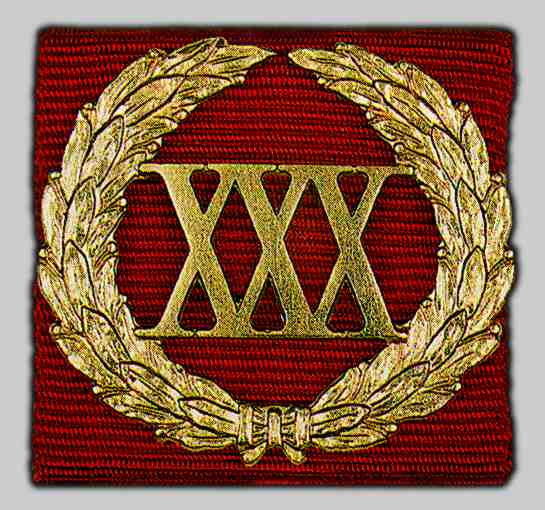
- Decorations "For Impeccable Service" for 25 and 30 years
- Type: State Decoration
- Awarded for: Impeccable service to the state
- Presented by: Russian Federation
- Eligibility: Citizens of the Russian Federation
- Status: Active
- Established: March 2, 1994

Precedence
- Next (higher): Honorary Titles of the Russian Federation
- Next (lower): Honorary Titles of the Soviet Union

The Decoration "For Impeccable Service" (Russian: знак отличия «За безупречную службу») is a state decoration of the Russian Federation aimed at recognising impeccable civilian or military service to the state beyond the scope of normal long service medals.

== Award History ==
The Decoration "For Impeccable Service" was established by presidential decree No. 442 on March 2, 1994. Its statute was further amended by presidential decree 1099 of September 7, 2010.

== Award Statute ==
The Decoration "For Impeccable Service" is divided into a civilian and a military division with different award criteria. Both are awarded for service of between 15 and 50 years.

- Civilian Division: the civilian decoration is awarded to citizens of the Russian Federation, elected or appointed to a position in accordance with the Constitution of the Russian Federation and federal laws, as well as to civil servants, for concrete contributions to the development of Russian statehood, strengthening the rule of law and order, and impeccable service of more than 15 years, as well as for other productive activities which brought substantial benefits to the Fatherland.
- Military Division: the military decoration is awarded to members of the Armed Forces of the Russian Federation with impeccable service of not less than 15 consecutive years, and who were awarded the Order or Medal for Courage displayed in the performance of military duties, or two or more awards of federal ministries or governmental agencies.

The Decoration "For Impeccable Service" is worn on the right side of the chest after the insignia to an honorary title of the Russian Federation, and if worn in the presence of state awards of the USSR, above them.

== Award Description ==
The Decoration "For Impeccable Service" is a 29 mm high by 32 mm wide rectangular strip of medal ribbon upon which a gilt silver device composed of Roman numerals denoting years of service, surrounded by a wreath of laurel branches for civilian recipients or of oak branches for military recipients, is affixed. The red ribbon of the Order For Merit to the Fatherland is used for civilian recipients, the Ribbon of Saint George is used for military recipients.

== Award Recipients (partial list) ==
The individuals below were awarded the Decoration "For Impeccable Service" with Roman numeral "L" for 50 years of impeccable service to the state:

- Alexander Stradymov Lukic, chief specialist of the Office of Human Resources of the Federal Service of Russian TV and Radio (May 1999);
- Vasily Konstantinovich Vyacheslavov, a judge of the Supreme Court of the Russian Federation (September 2002);
- Zinaida Ivanovna Tikhomirova an expert accountant on the budget of the Department of Finance Administration of the Yamalo-Nenets Autonomous District (April 2003);
- Lyudmila Zajkina, chairman of Pervomaisky district court in Murmansk (August 2006);
- Vladimir Resin, State Duma, Moscow (December 2011).

The individuals below were awarded the Decoration "For Impeccable Service" with Roman numeral "XL" for 40 years of impeccable service to the state:

- Anatoliy Krasnoselskikh, consultant in the Commission under the President of the Russian Federation on state awards (April 1996);
- Lyudmila Zajkina, chairman of the Pervomaisky district court in Murmansk (June 1997);
- Vladimir Sokolov, a senior inspector of the Department of the Ministry of Foreign Affairs of the Russian Federation (December 1999);
- Anatoly Fedoseevich Tishchenko, Deputy Director of the Ministry of Foreign Affairs of the Russian Federation (May 2000);
- Lyudmila Revizorova, a senior inspector of the Department of Labour Conditions and Protection of the Ministry of Labour and Social Development of the Russian Federation (February 2002);
- Lidia Ivanovna Yakovleva, a leading specialist of the Department of Defense Industry and High Technologies (April 2006);
- Galina Kurtasova, Deputy Director, Department of Intergovernmental Relations of the Ministry of Finance of the Russian Federation (December 2008);
- Valery Polyankin, Expert of the Russian Embassy in the Republic of Belarus (October 2009);
- Boris I. Fesenko, Deputy Director of Information of the Press Department of the Ministry of Foreign Affairs of the Russian Federation (January 2011).

== See also ==
- Awards and decorations of the Russian Federation
- Ribbon of Saint George
