= Medal "For Life Saving" =

Medal For Life Saving
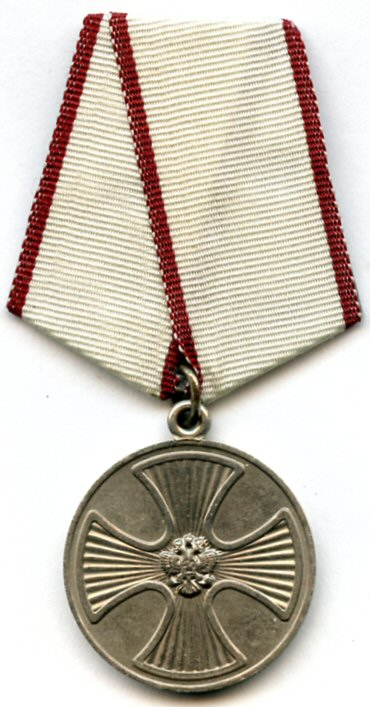
- Medal Life Saving (obverse)
- Type: State Decoration
- Awarded for: Rescuing people in circumstances involving a risk to life
- Presented by: Russian Federation
- Eligibility: Citizens of the Russian Federation
- Status: Active
- Established: March 2, 1994
- First award: November 11, 1994
- Ribbon of the Medal For Life Saving

Precedence
- Next (higher): Medal "For Distinction in Protection of the State Borders"
- Next (lower): Medal "For Work in Agriculture"

The Medal "For Life Saving" (Russian: медаль «За спасение погибавших») is a state decoration of the Russian Federation.

== History ==
The Medal "For Life Saving" was established on March 2, 1994 by Presidential Decree № 442. Its statute was amended three times, first on January 6, 1999 by presidential decree № 19, again on June 1, 1995 by presidential decree № 554 and lastly by the all encompassing presidential decree № 1099 of September 7, 2010 which amended the entire Russian awards system away from the distinctions of the Soviet Era.

== Award Statute ==
The Medal "For Life Saving" is awarded to citizens for rescuing people during natural disasters, on water, under ground, in fire-fighting and other circumstances involving a risk to life. The medal may be awarded posthumously.

The order of precedence of the Russian Federation states that the Medal "For Life Saving" is to be worn on the left breast with other medals and placed immediately after the Medal "For Distinction in Protection of the State Borders".

== Award Description ==
The Medal "For Life Saving" is a circular 32mm diameter silver medal with raised rims on both the obverse and reverse. The obverse bears the relief image of the Order of Courage. On the reverse lower center and left half, intertwined branches of palm, laurel and oak. In the right half of the reverse, the relief inscription "FOR LIFE SAVING" (Russian: «ЗА СПАСЕНИЕ ПОГИБАВШИХ»). In the lower portion of the reverse, below the branches just above the lower rim of the medal, a relief letter "N" with a line reserved for the award serial number.

The medal is suspended to a standard Russian pentagonal mount with a ring through the medal's suspension loop. The mount is covered by an overlapping 24mm wide white silk moiré ribbon with 2mm red edge stripes.

== Numbers Awarded ==
- Medals awarded to date:

1994	1995	1996	1997	1998	1999	2000	2001	2002	2003	2004	2005	2006	2007	2008	2009	2010	2011	2012	2013	2014	2015	2016	Total
28	511	1984	1179	1002	685	328	260	469	250	169	151	179	261	132	98	226	165	180	93	61	47	6	8464

== See also ==
- Awards and decorations of the Russian Federation
