= Medal "For Distinction in the Protection of the State Borders" =

Russian state award

Medal "For Distinction in Protection of the State Borders"
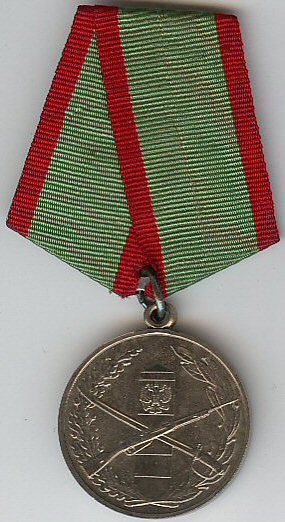
- Medal "For Distinction in Protection of the State Borders" (obverse)
- Type: State Decoration
- Awarded for: Combat exploits and special services rendered in the protection of the state borders of the Russian Federation
- Presented by: Russian Federation
- Eligibility: Citizens of the Russian Federation
- Status: Active
- Established: March 2, 1994
- Ribbon of the Medal "For Distinction in Protection of the State Borders"

Precedence
- Next (higher): Medal "For Distinction in the Protection of Public Order"
- Next (lower): Medal "For Life Saving"

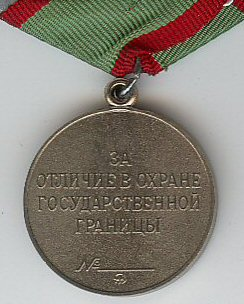
Reverse of the Medal "For Distinction in Protection of the State Borders"

The Medal "For Distinction in Protection of the State Borders" (Russian: Медаль «За отличие в охране государственной границы») is a state award of the Russian Federation. It can trace its lineage back to the Soviet Medal "For Distinction in Guarding the State Border of the USSR".

== History ==
The Medal "For Distinction in Protection of the State Borders" was established on March 2, 1994 by Presidential Decree № 442 which was later amended by presidential decree № 19 of January 6, 1999. Presidential decree № 1099 of September 7, 2010 amended the entire Russian awards system away from the distinctions of the Soviet Era, this included changes to the medal's statute.

== Award statute ==
The Medal "For Distinction in Protection of the State Borders" is awarded to soldiers of the Border Guard Service of Russia, as well as to other citizens, for combat exploits and special services rendered in the protection of the state borders of the Russian Federation; for bravery and dedication displayed in combat operations during the arrest of violators of the state borders of the Russian Federation; for leadership in protecting the integrity of the state borders of the Russian Federation; for displaying a high degree of vigilance and proactive actions which resulted in the arrest of violators of the state borders of the Russian Federation; for the excellent performance of duties in the protection of the state borders of the Russian Federation, for active assistance to the Federal Security Service in its efforts to protect the state borders of the Russian Federation.

The Russian Federation Order of Precedence dictates the Medal "For Distinction in Protection of the State Borders" is to be worn on the left breast with other medals immediately after the Medal "For Distinction in the Protection of Public Order".

== Award description ==
The Medal "For Distinction in Protection of the State Borders" is a 32 mm-diameter (1.3 in) circular silver medal with raised rims. On its obverse in the background, a border marker bearing the State Emblem of the Russian Federation, following the medal circumference from the bottom center to just short of the tip of the border marker, an oak branch along the left side and a laurel branch along the right side, in front of the marker, a rifle bearing a bayonet crossing a sword at a 45-degree angle. On the reverse, the relief inscription in four lines "FOR DISTINCTION IN PROTECTION OF THE STATE BORDERS" (Russian: "ЗА ОТЛИЧИЕ В ОХРАНЕ ГОСУДАРСТВЕННОЙ ГРАНИЦЫ"), below the inscription, "№" in relief followed by a horizontal line for the award serial number, below the line, the maker's mark.

The medal is suspended to a standard Russian pentagonal mount by a ring through the medal's suspension loop. The mount is covered by an overlapping 24mm wide green silk moiré ribbon with 3mm red edge stripes.

== See also ==
- Orders, decorations, and medals of the Russian Federation
- Awards and decorations of the Soviet Union
- Border Guard Service of Russia
