= Chapayevo, Russia =

Chapayevo (Russian: Чапаево) is the name of several rural localities in Russia.

== Modern localities ==
- Chapayevo, Astrakhan Oblast, a selo in Chapayevsky Selsoviet of Kamyzyaksky District in Astrakhan Oblast; 45°59′N 48°16′E
- Chapayevo, Davlekanovsky District, Republic of Bashkortostan, a selo in Kidryachevsky Selsoviet of Davlekanovsky District in the Republic of Bashkortostan
- Chapayevo, Tuymazinsky District, Republic of Bashkortostan, a village in Verkhnetroitsky Selsoviet of Tuymazinsky District in the Republic of Bashkortostan
- Chapayevo, Republic of Dagestan, a selo in Novolaksky District of the Republic of Dagestan; 43°7′N 46°29′E
- Chapayevo, Bagrationovsky District, Kaliningrad Oblast, a settlement in Dolgorukovsky Rural Okrug of Bagrationovsky District in Kaliningrad Oblast
- Chapayevo, Nesterovsky District, Kaliningrad Oblast, a settlement in Prigorodny Rural Okrug of Nesterovsky District in Kaliningrad Oblast
- Chapayevo, Republic of Khakassia, a village in Kalininsky Selsoviet of Ust-Abakansky District in the Republic of Khakassia
- Chapayevo, Republic of Mordovia, a village in Mikhaylovsky Selsoviet of Lyambirsky District in the Republic of Mordovia
- Chapayevo, Moscow Oblast, a village under the administrative jurisdiction of Lotoshino Work Settlement in Lotoshinsky District of Moscow Oblast
- Chapayevo, Omsk Oblast, a selo in Chapayevsky Rural Okrug of Kolosovsky District in Omsk Oblast
- Chapayevo, Orenburg Oblast, a settlement in Yakovlevsky Selsoviet of Asekeyevsky District in Orenburg Oblast
- Chapayevo, Khangalassky District, Sakha Republic, a selo in Oktyomsky Rural Okrug of Khangalassky District in the Sakha Republic
- Chapayevo, Olyokminsky District, Sakha Republic, a selo in Chapayevsky Rural Okrug of Olyokminsky District in the Sakha Republic
- Chapayevo, Sakhalin Oblast, a selo in Korsakovsky District of Sakhalin Oblast
- Chapayevo, Samara Oblast, a selo in Krasnoyarsky District of Samara Oblast
- Chapayevo, Tyumen Oblast, a settlement in Leninsky Rural Okrug of Abatsky District in Tyumen Oblast

== Alternative names ==
- Chapayevo, alternative name of imeni Chapayeva, a settlement in Chapayevskoye Settlement of Krasnoselsky District in Kostroma Oblast; 57°38′N 41°24′E
- Chapayevo, alternative name of Chapayevskoye, a selo in Prikubansky District of the Karachay-Cherkess Republic; 44°17′N 42°4′E
