= Rublyovka, Republic of Bashkortostan =

Rublyovka Рублёвка
- Village
- Location within Bashkortostan Location within Russia
- Coordinates: 54°11′N 55°14′E
- Country: Russia
- Region: Bashkortostan
- District: Davlekanovsky District
- Time zone: UTC+5:00

Rublyovka (Russian: Рублёвка) is a rural locality (a village) in Bik-Karmalinsky Selsoviet, Davlekanovsky District, Bashkortostan, Russia. The population was 112 as of 2010. There are 2 streets.

== Geography ==
Rublyovka is located 16 km east of Davlekanovo (the district's administrative centre) by road. Almetovo is the nearest rural locality.
