= Kuryatmasovo =

Kuryatmasovo Курятмасово
- Selo
- Location within Bashkortostan Location within Russia
- Coordinates: 54°14′N 54°33′E
- Country: Russia
- Region: Bashkortostan
- District: Davlekanovsky District
- Time zone: UTC+5:00

Kuryatmasovo (Russian: Курятмасово; Bashkir: Ҡоръятмаҫ, Qoryatmaś) is a rural locality (a selo) in Alginsky Selsoviet, Davlekanovsky District, Bashkortostan, Russia. The population was 259 as of 2010. There are 8 streets.

== Geography ==
Kuryatmasovo is located 36 km west of Davlekanovo (the district's administrative centre) by road. Mikyashevo is the nearest rural locality.
