= Kadyrgulovo =

Kadyrgulovo Кадыргулово
- Village
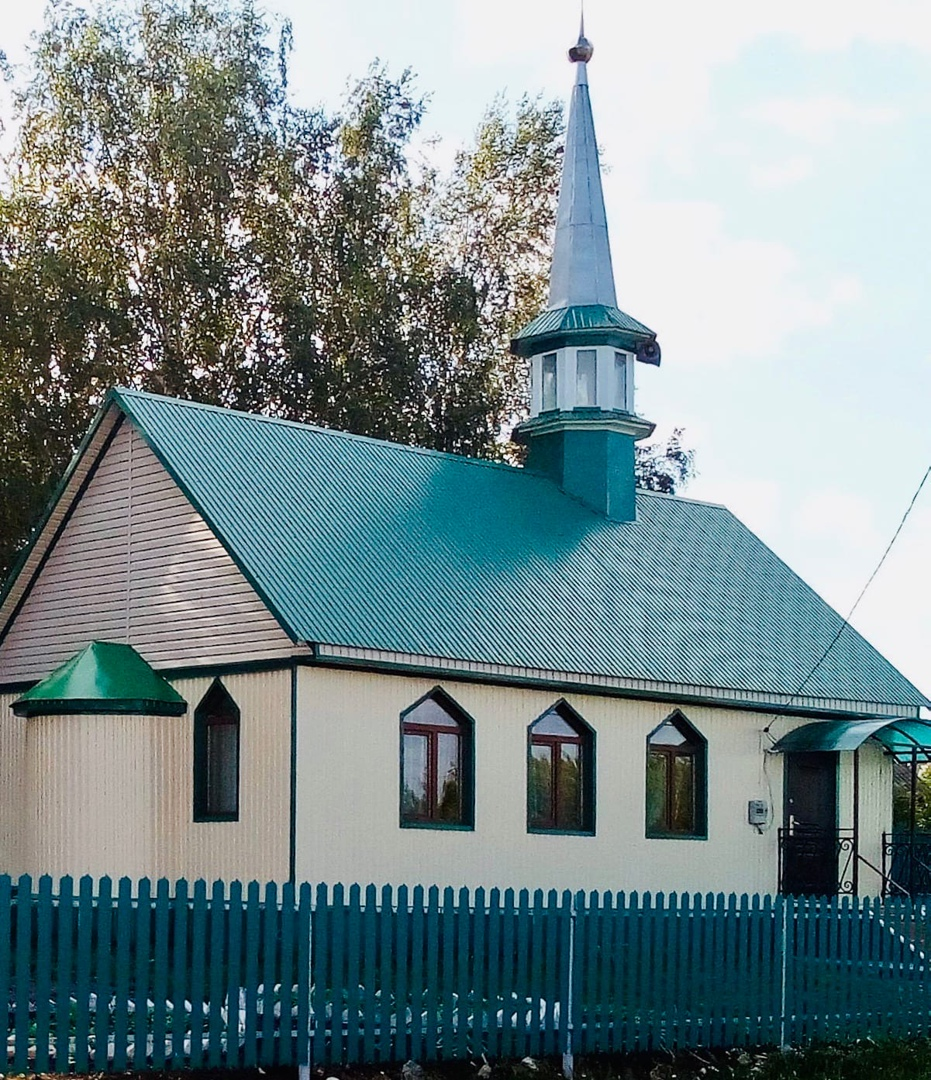
- Mosque in Kadyrgulovo

- Location within Bashkortostan Location within Russia
- Coordinates: 54°09′N 55°33′E
- Country: Russia
- Region: Bashkortostan
- District: Davlekanovsky District
- Time zone: UTC+5:00

Kadyrgulovo (Russian: Кадыргулово; Bashkir: Ҡаҙырғол, Qaźırğol) is a rural locality (a village) and the administrative centre of Kadyrgulovsky Selsoviet, Davlekanovsky District, Bashkortostan, Russia. The population was 234 as of 2010.

== Geography ==
Kadyrgulovo is located 41 km southeast of Davlekanovo (the district's administrative centre) by road. Gumerovo is the nearest rural locality.
