= Urtatau =

Urtatau Уртатау
- Village
- Location within Bashkortostan Location within Russia
- Coordinates: 54°10′N 54°49′E
- Country: Russia
- Region: Bashkortostan
- District: Davlekanovsky District
- Time zone: UTC+5:00

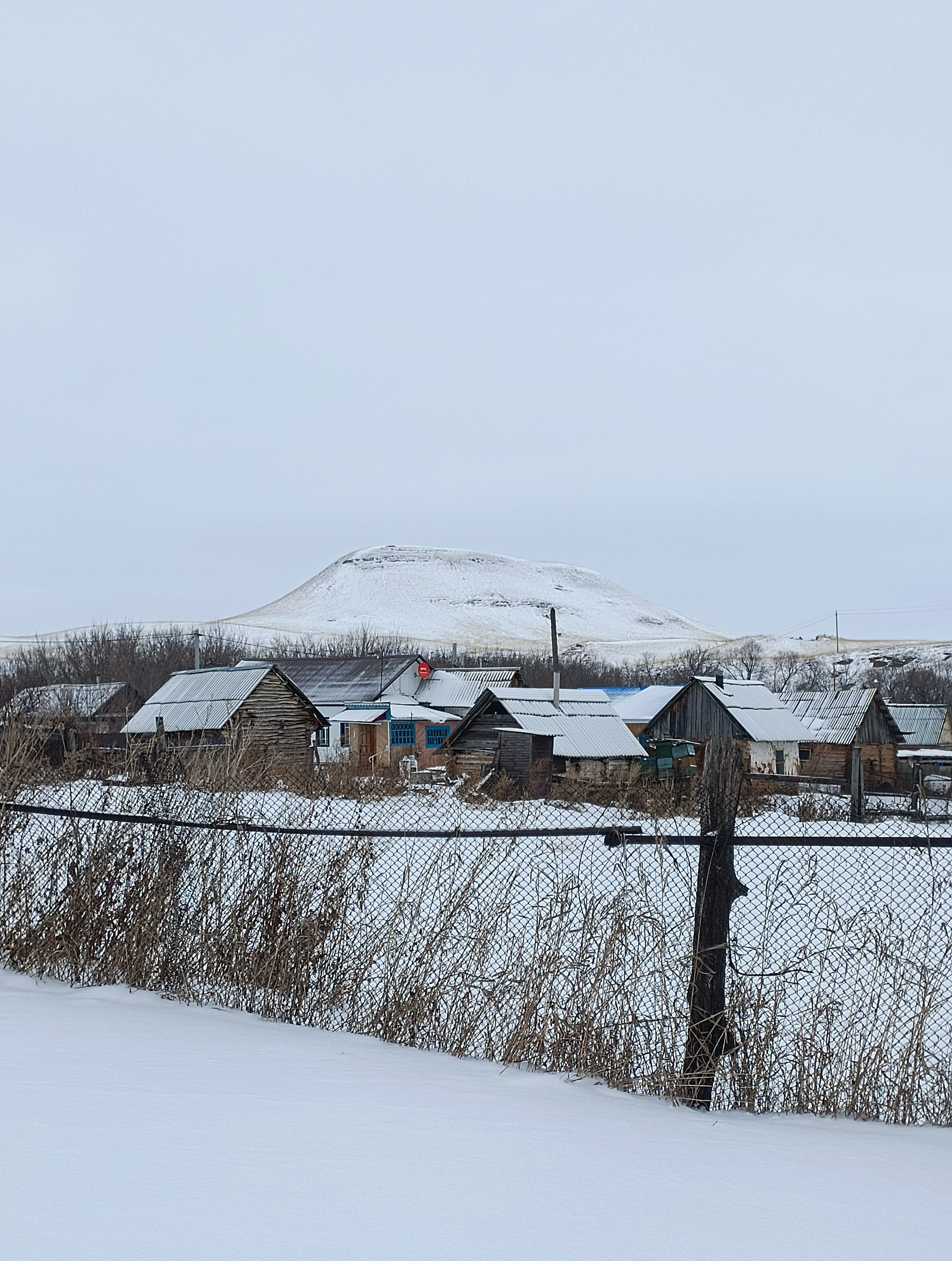

Urtatau (Russian: Уртатау; Bashkir: Уртатау, Urtataw) is a rural locality (a village) in Sergiopolsky Selsoviet, Davlekanovsky District, Bashkortostan, Russia. The population was 67 as of 2010. There is 1 street.

== Geography ==
Urtatau is located 16 km southwest of Davlekanovo (the district's administrative centre) by road. Tavrichanka is the nearest rural locality.
