= Staromryasovo =

Staromryasovo Старомрясово
- Selo
- Location within Bashkortostan Location within Russia
- Coordinates: 54°16′N 55°31′E
- Country: Russia
- Region: Bashkortostan
- District: Davlekanovsky District
- Time zone: UTC+5:00

Staromryasovo (Russian: Старомрясово; Bashkir: Иҫке Мерәҫ, İśke Meräś) is a rural locality (a selo) in Imay-Karmalinsky Selsoviet, Davlekanovsky District, Bashkortostan, Russia. The population was 259 as of 2010. There is 1 street.

== Geography ==
Staromryasovo is located 40 km east of Davlekanovo (the district's administrative centre) by road. Novomryasovo is the nearest rural locality.
