= Bakhcha =

Bakhcha Бахча
- Village
- Location within Bashkortostan Location within Russia
- Coordinates: 54°08′N 55°17′E
- Country: Russia
- Region: Bashkortostan
- District: Davlekanovsky District
- Time zone: UTC+5:00

Bakhcha (Russian: Бахча; Bashkir: Баҡса, Baqsa) is a rural locality (a village) in Bik-Karmalinsky Selsoviet, Davlekanovsky District, Bashkortostan, Russia. The population was 78 as of 2010. There is 1 street.

== Geography ==
Bakhcha is located 22 km southeast of Davlekanovo (the district's administrative centre) by road. Vyazovka is the nearest rural locality.
