= Tuksanbay =

Tuksanbay Туксанбай
- Selo
- Location within Bashkortostan Location within Russia
- Coordinates: 54°18′N 55°08′E
- Country: Russia
- Region: Bashkortostan
- District: Davlekanovsky District
- Time zone: UTC+5:00

Tuksanbay (Russian: Туксанбай; Bashkir: Туҡһанбай, Tuqhanbay) is a rural locality (a selo) in Polyakovsky Selsoviet, Davlekanovsky District, Bashkortostan, Russia. The population was 5 as of 2010.

== Geography ==
Tuksanbay is located 14 km northeast of Davlekanovo (the district's administrative centre) by road. Vperyod is the nearest rural locality.
