= Sergiopol, Republic of Bashkortostan =

Sergiopol Сергиополь
- Village
- Sunset in Sergiopol, 2023

- Location within Bashkortostan Location within Russia
- Coordinates: 54°12′N 54°56′E
- Country: Russia
- Region: Bashkortostan
- District: Davlekanovsky District
- Time zone: UTC+5:00

Sergiopol (Russian: Сергиополь) is a rural locality (a village) and the administrative centre of Sergiopolsky Selsoviet, Davlekanovsky District, Bashkortostan, Russia. The population was 362 as of 2010. There are 6 streets.

== Geography ==
Sergiopol is located 6 km west of Davlekanovo (the district's administrative centre) by road. Doroshevka is the nearest rural locality.
