= Chuyunchi =

Chuyunchi Чуюнчи
- Selo
- Location within Bashkortostan Location within Russia
- Coordinates: 54°06′N 55°21′E
- Country: Russia
- Region: Bashkortostan
- District: Davlekanovsky District
- Time zone: UTC+5:00

Chuyunchi (Russian: Чуюнчи; Bashkir: Суйынсы, Suyınsı) is a rural locality (a selo) and the administrative centre of Chuyunchinsky Selsoviet, Davlekanovsky District, Bashkortostan, Russia. The population was 475 as of 2010. There are 7 streets.

== Geography ==
Chuyunchi is located 32 km southeast of Davlekanovo (the district's administrative centre) by road. Chuyunchi-Nikolayevka is the nearest rural locality.
