= Novoyanbekovo =

Novoyanbekovo Новоянбеково
- Village
- Location within Bashkortostan Location within Russia
- Coordinates: 54°11′N 55°33′E
- Country: Russia
- Region: Bashkortostan
- District: Davlekanovsky District
- Time zone: UTC+5:00

Novoyanbekovo (Russian: Новоянбеково; Bashkir: Яңы Йәнбәк, Yañı Yänbäk) is a rural locality (a village) in Kadyrgulovsky Selsoviet, Davlekanovsky District, Bashkortostan, Russia. The population was 187 as of 2010. There is 1 street.

== Geography ==
Novoyanbekovo is located 46 km east of Davlekanovo (the district's administrative centre) by road. Kamchalytamak is the nearest rural locality.
