= Novomryasovo =

Novomryasovo Новомрясово
- Village
- Location within Bashkortostan Location within Russia
- Coordinates: 54°15′N 55°31′E
- Country: Russia
- Region: Bashkortostan
- District: Davlekanovsky District
- Time zone: UTC+5:00

Novomryasovo (Russian: Новомрясово; Bashkir: Яңы Мерәҫ, Yañı Meräś) is a rural locality (a village) in Imay-Karmalinsky Selsoviet, Davlekanovsky District, Bashkortostan, Russia. The population was 170 as of 2010. There are 3 streets.

== Geography ==
Novomryasovo is located 41 km east of Davlekanovo (the district's administrative centre) by road. Staromryasovo is the nearest rural locality.
