= Gorchaki =

Gorchaki Горчаки
- Village
- Location within Bashkortostan Location within Russia
- Coordinates: 54°15′N 54°43′E
- Country: Russia
- Region: Bashkortostan
- District: Davlekanovsky District
- Time zone: UTC+5:00

Gorchaki (Russian: Горчаки) is a rural locality (a village) in Mikyashevsky Selsoviet, Davlekanovsky District, Bashkortostan, Russia. The population was 120 as of 2010. There is 1 street.

== Geography ==
Gorchaki is located 24 km west of Davlekanovo (the district's administrative centre) by road. Akhunovo is the nearest rural locality.
