= Shestayevo =

Shestayevo Шестаево
- Selo
- Location within Bashkortostan Location within Russia
- Coordinates: 54°24′N 54°54′E
- Country: Russia
- Region: Bashkortostan
- District: Davlekanovsky District
- Time zone: UTC+5:00

Shestayevo (Russian: Шестаево) is a rural locality (a selo) and the administrative centre of Shestayevsky Selsoviet, Davlekanovsky District, Bashkortostan, Russia. The population was 154 as of 2010. There are 3 streets.

== Geography ==
Shestayevo is located 28 km north of Davlekanovo (the district's administrative centre) by road. Politotdel is the nearest rural locality.
