= Mikyashevo =

Mikyashevo Микяшево
- Selo
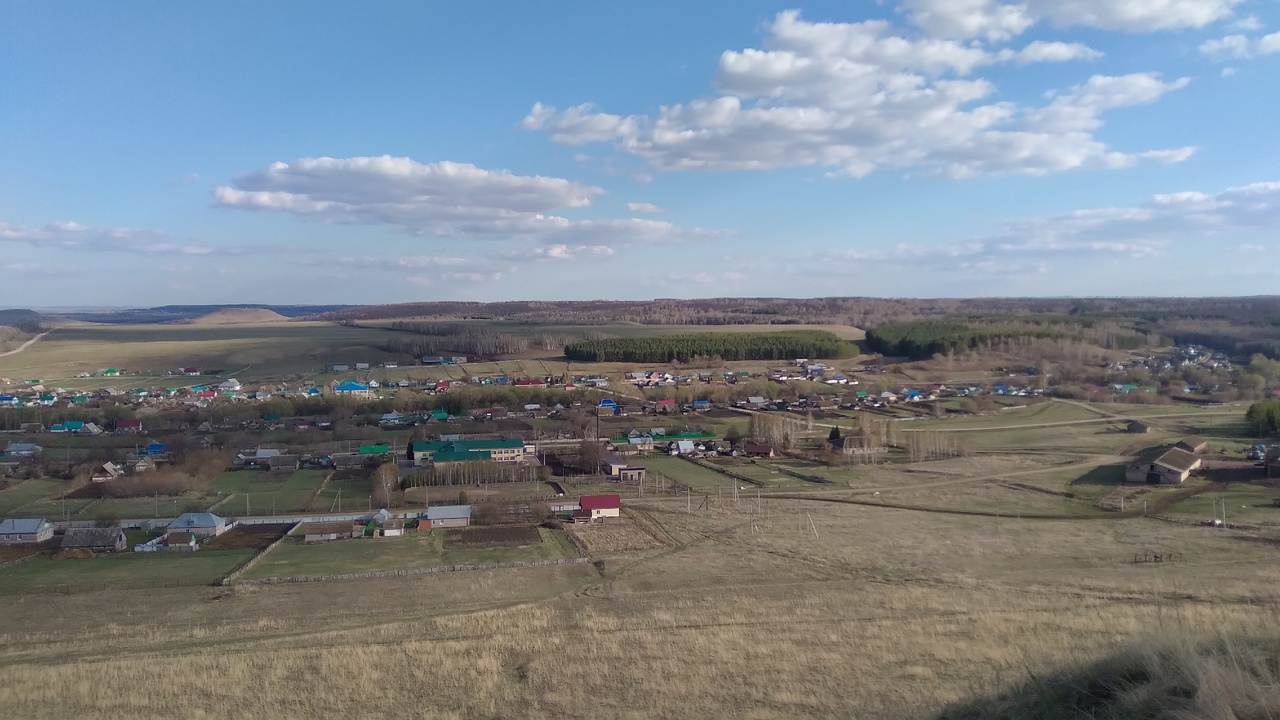
- Makakash village

- Location within Bashkortostan Location within Russia
- Coordinates: 54°13′N 54°39′E
- Country: Russia
- Region: Bashkortostan
- District: Davlekanovsky District
- Time zone: UTC+5:00

Mikyashevo (Russian: Микяшево; Bashkir: Мәкәш, Mäkäş) is a rural locality (a selo) and the administrative centre of Mikyashevsky Selsoviet, Davlekanovsky District, Bashkortostan, Russia. The population was 782 as of 2010. There are 6 streets.

== Geography ==
Mikyashevo is located 29 km west of Davlekanovo (the district's administrative centre) by road. Kuryatmasovo is the nearest rural locality.
