= Volynka, Republic of Bashkortostan =

Volynka Волынка
- Village
- Location within Bashkortostan Location within Russia
- Coordinates: 54°20′N 55°05′E
- Country: Russia
- Region: Bashkortostan
- District: Davlekanovsky District
- Time zone: UTC+5:00

Volynka (Russian: Волынка) is a rural locality (a village) in Polyakovsky Selsoviet, Davlekanovsky District, Bashkortostan, Russia. The population was 16 as of 2010. There is 1 street.

== Geography ==
Volynka is located 21 km northeast of Davlekanovo (the district's administrative centre) by road. Sidorovka is the nearest rural locality.
