= Batraki =

Batraki Батраки
- Village
- Location within Bashkortostan Location within Russia
- Coordinates: 54°15′N 55°22′E
- Country: Russia
- Region: Bashkortostan
- District: Davlekanovsky District
- Time zone: UTC+5:00

Batraki (Russian: Батраки; Bashkir: Батрак, Batrak) is a rural locality (a village) in Imay-Karmalinsky Selsoviet, Davlekanovsky District, Bashkortostan, Russia. The population was 88 as of 2010. There is 1 street.

== Geography ==
Batraki is located 34 km northeast of Davlekanovo (the district's administrative centre) by road. Karatal is the nearest rural locality.
