= Yangi-Turmush =

Yangi-Turmush Янги-Турмуш
- Village
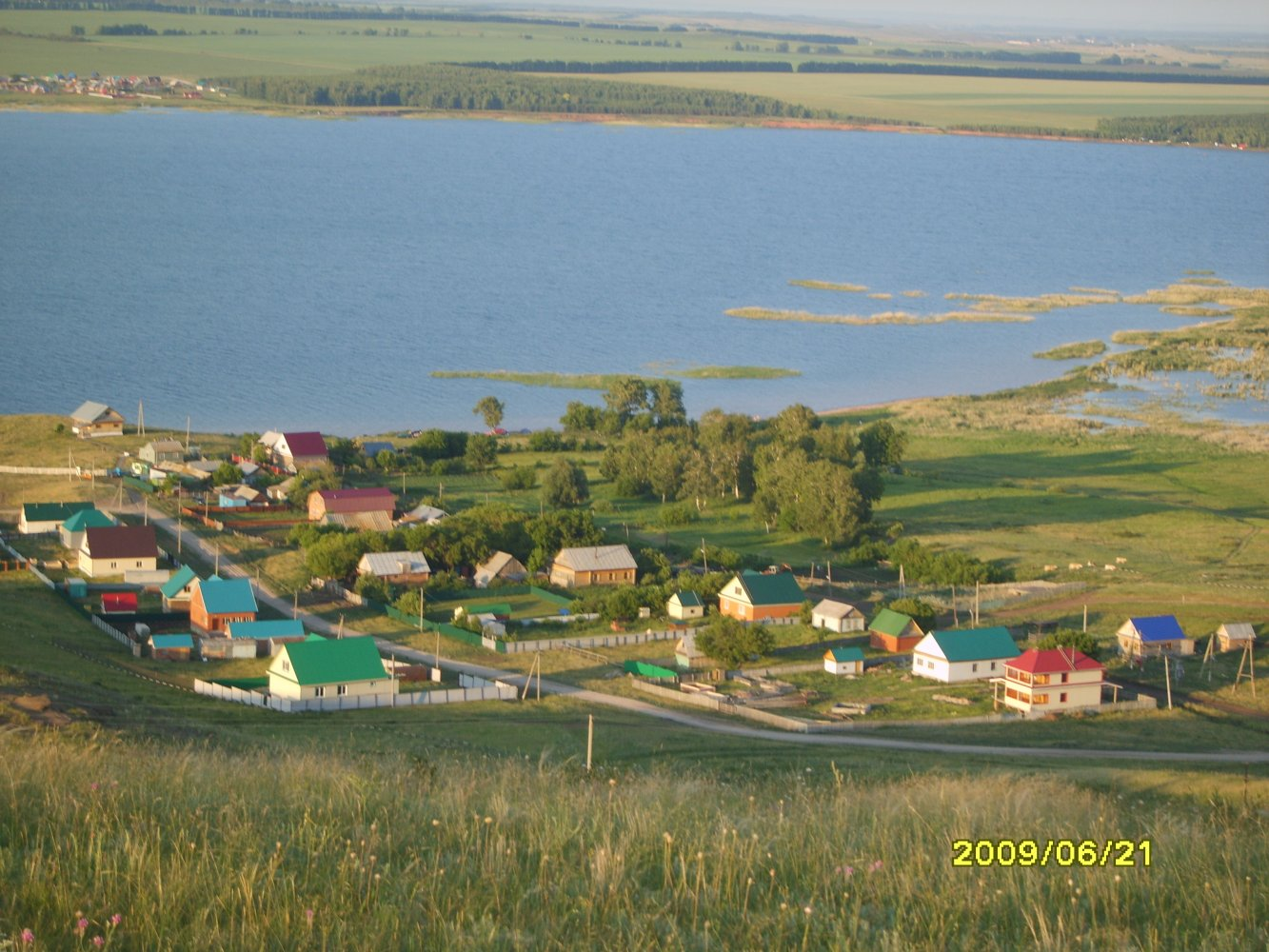

- Location within Bashkortostan Location within Russia
- Coordinates: 54°17′N 54°35′E
- Country: Russia
- Region: Bashkortostan
- District: Davlekanovsky District
- Time zone: UTC+5:00

Yangi-Turmush (Russian: Янги-Турмуш; Bashkir: Яңы Тормош, Yañı Tormoş) is a rural locality (a village) in Alginsky Selsoviet, Davlekanovsky District, Bashkortostan, Russia. The population was 9 as of 2010. There is 1 street.

== Geography ==
Yangi-Turmush is located 36 km northwest of Davlekanovo (the district's administrative centre) by road. Alga is the nearest rural locality.
