= Balto-Ivanovka =

Balto-Ivanovka Балто-Ивановка
- Village
- Location within Bashkortostan Location within Russia
- Coordinates: 54°20′N 55°03′E
- Country: Russia
- Region: Bashkortostan
- District: Davlekanovsky District
- Time zone: UTC+5:00

Balto-Ivanovka (Russian: Балто-Ивановка) is a rural locality (a village) in Polyakovsky Selsoviet, Davlekanovsky District, Bashkortostan, Russia. The population was 52 as of 2010. There is one street.

== Geography ==
Balto-Ivanovka is located 22 km north of Davlekanovo (the district's administrative centre) by road. Sidorovka is the nearest rural locality.
