= Kamchalytamak =

Kamchalytamak Камчалытамак
- Selo
- Location within Bashkortostan Location within Russia
- Coordinates: 54°12′N 55°33′E
- Country: Russia
- Region: Bashkortostan
- District: Davlekanovsky District
- Time zone: UTC+5:00

Kamchalytamak (Russian: Камчалытамак; Bashkir: Ҡамсылытамаҡ, Qamsılıtamaq) is a rural locality (a selo) in Kadyrgulovsky Selsoviet, Davlekanovsky District, Bashkortostan, Russia. The population was 475 as of 2010. There are 3 streets.

== Geography ==
Kamchalytamak is located 48 km east of Davlekanovo (the district's administrative centre) by road. Novoyanbekovo is the nearest rural locality.
