= Kupoyarovo =

Kupoyarovo Купоярово
- Village
- Location within Bashkortostan Location within Russia
- Coordinates: 54°18′N 54°37′E
- Country: Russia
- Region: Bashkortostan
- District: Davlekanovsky District
- Time zone: UTC+5:00

Kupoyarovo (Russian: Купоярово; Bashkir: Ҡупаяр, Qupayar) is a rural locality (a village) in Alginsky Selsoviet, Davlekanovsky District, Bashkortostan, Russia. The population was 15 as of 2010. There are 2 streets.

== Geography ==
Kupoyarovo is located 34 km northwest of Davlekanovo (the district's administrative centre) by road. Alga is the nearest rural locality.
