= Yaskain =

Yaskain Яскаин
- Village
- Location within Bashkortostan Location within Russia
- Coordinates: 54°03′N 55°22′E
- Country: Russia
- Region: Bashkortostan
- District: Davlekanovsky District
- Time zone: UTC+5:00

Yaskain (Russian: Яскаин; Bashkir: Яҫҡайын, Yaśqayın) is a rural locality (a village) in Chuyunchinsky Selsoviet, Davlekanovsky District, Bashkortostan, Russia. The population was 52 as of 2010. There is 1 street.

== Geography ==
Yaskain is located 37 km southeast of Davlekanovo (the district's administrative centre) by road. Chuyunchi is the nearest rural locality.
