= Tashlytamak =

Tashlytamak Ташлытамак
- Village
- Location within Bashkortostan Location within Russia
- Coordinates: 54°13′N 55°21′E
- Country: Russia
- Region: Bashkortostan
- District: Davlekanovsky District
- Time zone: UTC+5:00

Tashlytamak (Russian: Ташлытамак; Bashkir: Ташлытамаҡ, Taşlıtamaq) is a rural locality (a village) in Imay-Karmalinsky Selsoviet, Davlekanovsky District, Bashkortostan, Russia. The population was 113 as of 2010. There are 3 streets.

== Geography ==
Tashlytamak is located 27 km east of Davlekanovo (the district's administrative centre) by road. Imay-Karmaly is the nearest rural locality.
