= Burangulovo, Davlekanovsky District, Republic of Bashkortostan =

Burangulovo Бурангулово
- Selo
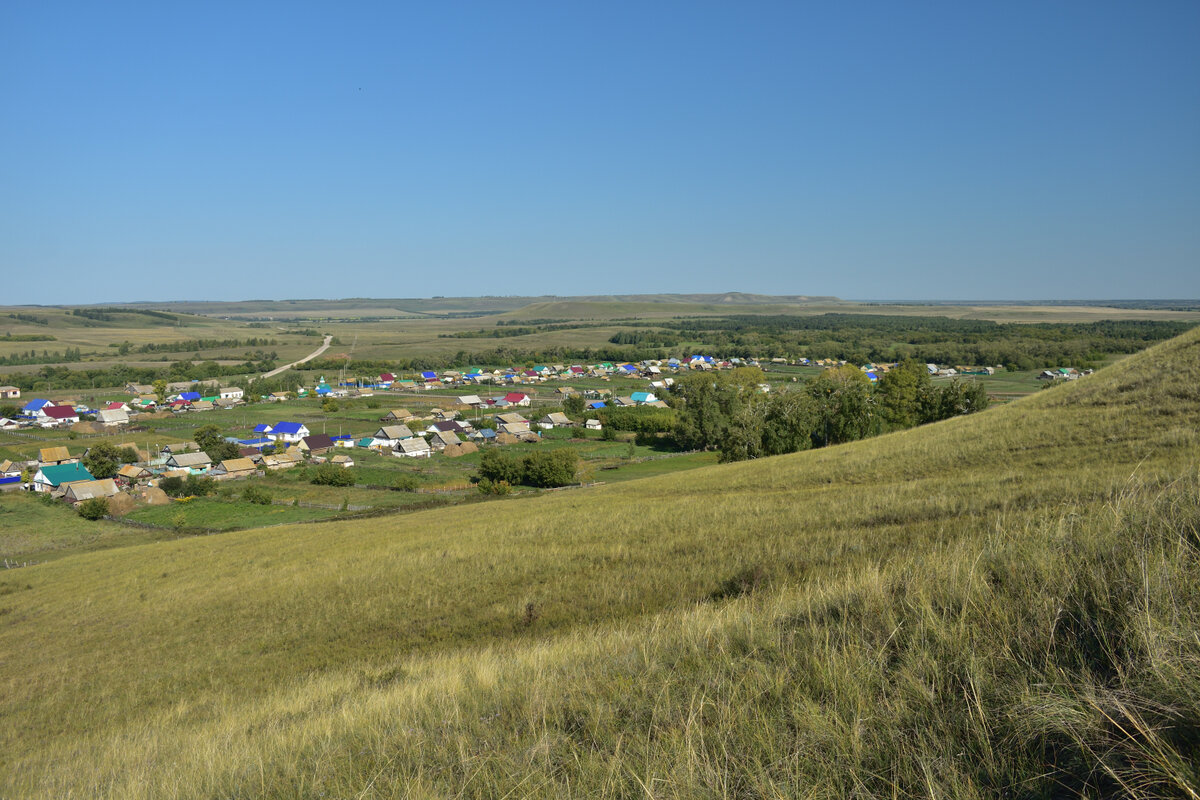
- Burangulovo city view

- Location within Bashkortostan Location within Russia
- Coordinates: 54°17′N 54°30′E
- Country: Russia
- Region: Bashkortostan
- District: Davlekanovsky District
- Time zone: UTC+5:00

Burangulovo (Russian: Бурангулово; Bashkir: Буранғол, Buranğol) is a rural locality (a selo) in Kidryachevsky Selsoviet, Davlekanovsky District, Bashkortostan, Russia. The population was 309 as of 2010. There are 3 streets.

== Geography ==
Burangulovo is located 42 km northwest of Davlekanovo (the district's administrative centre) by road. Kidryachevo is the nearest rural locality.
