= Staroyapparovo =

Staroyapparovo Старояппарово
- Selo
- Location within Bashkortostan Location within Russia
- Coordinates: 54°19′N 55°14′E
- Country: Russia
- Region: Bashkortostan
- District: Davlekanovsky District
- Time zone: UTC+5:00

Staroyapparovo (Russian: Старояппарово; Bashkir: Иҫке Яппар, İśke Yappar) is a rural locality (a selo) in Kazangulovsky Selsoviet, Davlekanovsky District, Bashkortostan, Russia. The population was 242 as of 2010. There are 4 streets.

== Geography ==
Staroyapparovo is located 26 km northeast of Davlekanovo (the district's administrative centre) by road. Novoyapparovo is the nearest rural locality.
