= Tashly-Sharipovo =

Tashly-Sharipovo Ташлы-Шарипово
- Selo
- Location within Bashkortostan Location within Russia
- Coordinates: 54°13′N 55°18′E
- Country: Russia
- Region: Bashkortostan
- District: Davlekanovsky District
- Time zone: UTC+5:00

Tashly-Sharipovo (Russian: Ташлы-Шарипово; Bashkir: Ташлы-Шәрип, Taşlı-Şärip) is a rural locality (a selo) in Imay-Karmalinsky Selsoviet, Davlekanovsky District, Bashkortostan, Russia. The population was 344 as of 2010. There are 6 streets.

== Geography ==
Tashly-Sharipovo is located 24 km east of Davlekanovo (the district's administrative centre) by road. Tashlytamak is the nearest rural locality.
