= Komintern, Davlekanovsky District, Republic of Bashkortostan =

Komintern Коминтерн
- Village
- Location within Bashkortostan Location within Russia
- Coordinates: 54°05′N 55°09′E
- Country: Russia
- Region: Bashkortostan
- District: Davlekanovsky District
- Time zone: UTC+5:00

Komintern (Russian: Коминтерн) is a rural locality (a village) in Rayevsky Selsoviet, Davlekanovsky District, Bashkortostan, Russia. The population was 36 as of 2010. There is 1 street.

== Geography ==
Komintern is located 23 km southeast of Davlekanovo (the district's administrative centre) by road. Sultanovka is the nearest rural locality.
