= Novoivanovka, Davlekanovsky District, Republic of Bashkortostan =

Novoivanovka Новоивановка
- Village
- Location within Bashkortostan Location within Russia
- Coordinates: 54°21′N 55°07′E
- Country: Russia
- Region: Bashkortostan
- District: Davlekanovsky District
- Time zone: UTC+5:00

Novoivanovka (Russian: Новоивановка) is a rural locality (a village) in Polyakovsky Selsoviet, Davlekanovsky District, Bashkortostan, Russia. The population was 4 as of 2010. There is 1 street.

== Geography ==
Novoivanovka is located 24 km north of Davlekanovo (the district's administrative centre) by road. Volynka is the nearest rural locality.
