= Filippovka =

Filippovka Филипповка
- Selo
- Location within Bashkortostan Location within Russia
- Coordinates: 54°05′N 55°30′E
- Country: Russia
- Region: Bashkortostan
- District: Davlekanovsky District
- Time zone: UTC+5:00

Filippovka (Russian: Филипповка) is a rural locality (a selo) in Kadyrgulovsky Selsoviet, Davlekanovsky District, Bashkortostan, Russia. The population was 49 as of 2010. There are 3 streets.

== Geography ==
Filippovka is located 39 km southeast of Davlekanovo (the district's administrative centre) by road. Usmanovo is the nearest rural locality.
