= Bik-Karmaly =

Bik-Karmaly Бик-Кармалы
- Selo
- Location within Bashkortostan Location within Russia
- Coordinates: 54°09′N 55°20′E
- Country: Russia
- Region: Bashkortostan
- District: Davlekanovsky District
- Time zone: UTC+5:00

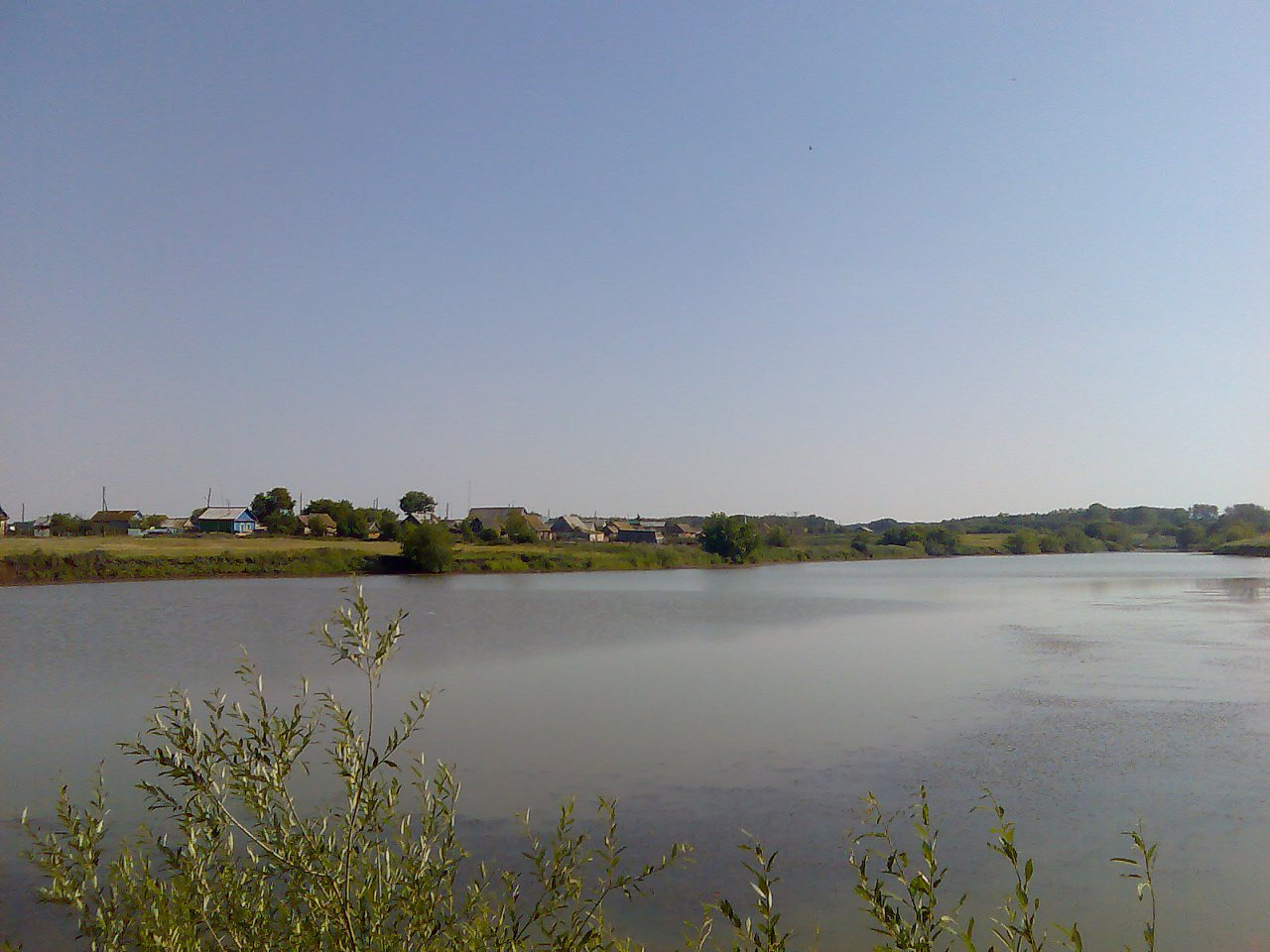
Bik-Karmaly

Bik-Karmaly (Russian: Бик-Кармалы; Bashkir: Бик-Ҡарамалы, Bik-Qaramalı) is a rural locality (a selo) and the administrative centre of Bik-Karmalinsky Selsoviet, Davlekanovsky District, Bashkortostan, Russia. The population was 324 as of 2010. There are 2 streets.

== Geography ==
Bik-Karmaly is located 23 km southeast of Davlekanovo (the district's administrative centre) by road. Zarya is the nearest rural locality.
