= Novosharipovo =

Novosharipovo Новошарипово
- Village
- Location within Bashkortostan Location within Russia
- Coordinates: 54°12′N 55°07′E
- Country: Russia
- Region: Bashkortostan
- District: Davlekanovsky District
- Time zone: UTC+5:00

Novosharipovo (Russian: Новошарипово; Bashkir: Яңы Шәрип, Yañı Şärip) is a rural locality (a village) in Sokolovsky Selsoviet, Davlekanovsky District, Bashkortostan, Russia. The population was 59 as of 2010.

== Geography ==
Novosharipovo is located 10 km southeast of Davlekanovo (the district's administrative centre) by road. Sokolovka is the nearest rural locality.
