= Khusainovo, Davlekanovsky District, Republic of Bashkortostan =

Khusainovo Хусаиново
- Selo
- Location within Bashkortostan Location within Russia
- Coordinates: 54°06′N 55°33′E
- Country: Russia
- Region: Bashkortostan
- District: Davlekanovsky District
- Time zone: UTC+5:00

Khusainovo (Russian: Хусаиново; Bashkir: Хөсәйен, Xösäyen) is a rural locality (a selo) in Kadyrgulovsky Selsoviet, Davlekanovsky District, Bashkortostan, Russia. The population was 304 as of 2010. There are 3 streets.

== Geography ==
Khusainovo is located 40 km southeast of Davlekanovo (the district's administrative centre) by road. Kadyrgulovo is the nearest rural locality.
