= Faridunovka =

Faridunovka Фаридуновка
- Village
- Location within Bashkortostan Location within Russia
- Coordinates: 54°14′N 55°06′E
- Country: Russia
- Region: Bashkortostan
- District: Davlekanovsky District
- Time zone: UTC+5:00

Faridunovka (Russian: Фаридуновка; Bashkir: Фәриҙун, Färiźun) is a rural locality (a village) in Sergiopolsky Selsoviet, Davlekanovsky District, Bashkortostan, Russia. The population was 134 as of 2010. There are 2 streets.

== Geography ==
Faridunovka is located 6 km northeast of Davlekanovo (the district's administrative centre) by road. Davlekanovo is the nearest rural locality.
