= Ivangorod (disambiguation) =

Ivangorod is a town in Leningrad Oblast, Russia

Ivangorod or Ivanhorod may also refer to:

- Ivangorod Fortress in the town Ivangorod
- Ivangorod, Russian name of the fortress and the village of Dęblin, Poland (1840 - 1915)
- Ivangorod, Republic of Bashkortostan, a rural locality (a village) in Davlekanovsky District of the Republic of Bashkortostan, Russia
- Ivanhorod, a village in Cherkasy Oblast, Ukraine
- Ivanhorod, a village in Zaporizhzhia Oblast, Ukraine
