= Yapar-Yanbekovo =

Yapar-Yanbekovo Япар-Янбеково
- Village
- Location within Bashkortostan Location within Russia
- Coordinates: 54°14′N 55°32′E
- Country: Russia
- Region: Bashkortostan
- District: Davlekanovsky District
- Time zone: UTC+5:00

Yapar-Yanbekovo (Russian: Япар-Янбеково; Bashkir: Яппар-Йәнбәк, Yappar-Yänbäk) is a rural locality (a village) in Imay-Karmalinsky Selsoviet, Davlekanovsky District, Bashkortostan, Russia. The population was 79 as of 2010. There is 1 street.

== Geography ==
Yapar-Yanbekovo is located 42 km east of Davlekanovo (the district's administrative centre) by road. Novomryasovo is the nearest rural locality.
