= Voroshilovo =

Voroshilovo Ворошилово
- Village
- Location within Bashkortostan Location within Russia
- Coordinates: 54°18′N 54°52′E
- Country: Russia
- Region: Bashkortostan
- District: Davlekanovsky District
- Time zone: UTC+5:00

Voroshilovo (Russian: Ворошилово) is a rural locality (a village) in Alginsky Selsoviet, Davlekanovsky District, Bashkortostan, Russia. The population was 34 as of 2010. There is 1 street.

== Geography ==
Voroshilovo is located 4 km northeast of Davlekanovo (the district's administrative centre) by road.
