= Ayukhanovo =

Ayukhanovo Аюханово
- Village
- Location within Bashkortostan Location within Russia
- Coordinates: 54°08′N 55°11′E
- Country: Russia
- Region: Bashkortostan
- District: Davlekanovsky District
- Time zone: UTC+5:00

Ayukhanovo (Russian: Аюханово; Bashkir: Айыухан, Ayıwxan) is a rural locality (a village) in Rayevsky Selsoviet, Davlekanovsky District, Bashkortostan, Russia. The population was 286 as of 2010. There are 3 streets.

== Geography ==
Ayukhanovo is located 16 km southeast of Davlekanovo (the district's administrative centre) by road. Rayevo is the nearest rural locality.
