= Vyazovka, Davlekanovsky District, Republic of Bashkortostan =

Vyazovka Вязовка
- Village
- Location within Bashkortostan Location within Russia
- Coordinates: 54°08′N 55°16′E
- Country: Russia
- Region: Bashkortostan
- District: Davlekanovsky District
- Time zone: UTC+5:00

Vyazovka (Russian: Вязовка) is a rural locality (a village) in Bik-Karmalinsky Selsoviet, Davlekanovsky District, Bashkortostan, Russia. The population was 16 as of 2010. There is 1 street.

== Geography ==
Vyazovka is located 23 km southeast of Davlekanovo (the district's administrative centre) by road. Bakhcha is the nearest rural locality.
