= Bishkain, Davlekanovsky District, Republic of Bashkortostan =

Bishkain Бишкаин
- Khutor
- Location within Bashkortostan Location within Russia
- Coordinates: 54°16′N 55°05′E
- Country: Russia
- Region: Bashkortostan
- District: Davlekanovsky District
- Time zone: UTC+5:00

Bishkain (Russian: Бишкаин; Bashkir: Бишҡайын, Bişqayın) is a rural locality (a khutor) in Polyakovsky Selsoviet, Davlekanovsky District, Bashkortostan, Russia. The population was 22 as of 2010.

== Geography ==
Bishkain is located 11 km northeast of Davlekanovo (the district's administrative centre) by road. Druzhba is the nearest rural locality.
