= Chapayevka =

Chapayevka may refer to:

- Chapayevka (river), a river in Samara Oblast, Russia
- Chapayevka, Russia, several rural localities in Russia
- Xanağa, known as Çapayevka until 2000, a municipality and village in the Ordubad District of Nakhchivan, Azerbaijan

== See also ==
- Vasily Chapayev, Russian Red Army commander during the Civil War
- Chapayevo (disambiguation)
