= Starosharipovo =

Starosharipovo Старошарипово
- Village
- Location within Bashkortostan Location within Russia
- Coordinates: 54°13′N 55°09′E
- Country: Russia
- Region: Bashkortostan
- District: Davlekanovsky District
- Time zone: UTC+5:00

Starosharipovo (Russian: Старошарипово; Bashkir: Иҫке Шәрип, İśke Şärip) is a rural locality (a village) in Sokolovsky Selsoviet, Davlekanovsky District, Bashkortostan, Russia. The population was 126 as of 2010. There are 3 streets.

== Geography ==
Starosharipovo is located 12 km east of Davlekanovo (the district's administrative centre) by road. Novosharipovo is the nearest rural locality.
