= Novoakkulayevo =

Novoakkulayevo Новоаккулаево
- Selo
- Location within Bashkortostan Location within Russia
- Coordinates: 54°08′N 55°00′E
- Country: Russia
- Region: Bashkortostan
- District: Davlekanovsky District
- Time zone: UTC+5:00

Novoakkulayevo (Russian: Новоаккулаево; Bashkir: Яңы Аҡҡолай, Yañı Aqqolay) is a rural locality (a selo) in Kurmankeyevsky Selsoviet, Davlekanovsky District, Bashkortostan, Russia. The population was 195 as of 2010. There are 2 streets.

== Geography ==
Novoakkulayevo is located 12 km south of Davlekanovo (the district's administrative centre) by road. Staroakkulayevo is the nearest rural locality.
