= Ismagilovo, Davlekanovsky District, Republic of Bashkortostan =

Ismagilovo Исмагилово
- Selo
- Location within Bashkortostan Location within Russia
- Coordinates: 54°15′N 55°07′E
- Country: Russia
- Region: Bashkortostan
- District: Davlekanovsky District
- Time zone: UTC+5:00

Ismagilovo (Russian: Исмагилово; Bashkir: Исмәғил, İsmäğil) is a rural locality (a selo) in Kazangulovsky Selsoviet, Davlekanovsky District, Bashkortostan, Russia. The population was 150 as of 2010. There are 2 streets.

== Geography ==
Ismagilovo is located 9 km northeast of Davlekanovo (the district's administrative centre) by road. Bishkain is the nearest rural locality.
