= Rayevo =

Rayevo Раево
- Village
- Location within Bashkortostan Location within Russia
- Coordinates: 54°07′N 55°10′E
- Country: Russia
- Region: Bashkortostan
- District: Davlekanovsky District
- Time zone: UTC+5:00

Rayevo (Russian: Раево) is a rural locality (a village) and the administrative centre of Rayevsky Selsoviet, Davlekanovsky District, Bashkortostan, Russia. The population was 314 as of 2010. There are 4 streets.

== Geography ==
Rayevo is located 19 km southeast of Davlekanovo (the district's administrative centre) by road. Ayukhanovo is the nearest rural locality.
