= Leninsky, Davlekanovsky District, Republic of Bashkortostan =

Leninsky Ленинский
- Selo
- Location within Bashkortostan Location within Russia
- Coordinates: 54°21′N 54°43′E
- Country: Russia
- Region: Bashkortostan
- District: Davlekanovsky District
- Time zone: UTC+5:00

Leninsky (Russian: Ленинский) is a rural locality (a selo) in Rassvetovsky Selsoviet, Davlekanovsky District, Bashkortostan, Russia. The population was 358 as of 2010. There are 6 streets.

== Geography ==
Leninsky is located 28 km northwest of Davlekanovo (the district's administrative centre) by road. Ivanovka is the nearest rural locality.
