= Karatal, Davlekanovsky District, Republic of Bashkortostan =

Karatal Каратал
- Village
- Location within Bashkortostan Location within Russia
- Coordinates: 54°15′N 55°22′E
- Country: Russia
- Region: Bashkortostan
- District: Davlekanovsky District
- Time zone: UTC+5:00

Karatal (Russian: Каратал; Bashkir: Ҡаратал, Qaratal) is a rural locality (a village) in Imay-Karmalinsky Selsoviet, Davlekanovsky District, Bashkortostan, Russia. The population was 87 as of 2010. There are 2 streets.

== Geography ==
Karatal is located 33 km east of Davlekanovo (the district's administrative centre) by road. Batraki is the nearest rural locality.
