= Sultanovka =

Sultanovka Султановка
- Village
- Location within Bashkortostan Location within Russia
- Coordinates: 54°05′N 55°11′E
- Country: Russia
- Region: Bashkortostan
- District: Davlekanovsky District
- Time zone: UTC+5:00

Sultanovka (Russian: Султановка; Bashkir: Солтан, Soltan) is a rural locality (a village) in Rayevsky Selsoviet, Davlekanovsky District, Bashkortostan, Russia. The population was 12 as of 2010. There is 1 street.

== Geography ==
Sultanovka is located 25 km southeast of Davlekanovo (the district's administrative centre) by road. Komintern is the nearest rural locality.
