= Iskandarovo =

Iskandarovo Искандарово
- Selo
- Location within Bashkortostan Location within Russia
- Coordinates: 54°10′N 55°23′E
- Country: Russia
- Region: Bashkortostan
- District: Davlekanovsky District
- Time zone: UTC+5:00

Iskandarovo (Russian: Искандарово; Bashkir: Искәндәр, İskändär) is a rural locality (a selo) in Bik-Karmalinsky Selsoviet, Davlekanovsky District, Bashkortostan, Russia. The population was 254 as of 2010. There are 2 streets.

== Geography ==
Iskandarovo is located 31 km southeast of Davlekanovo (the district's administrative centre) by road. Khotimlya is the nearest rural locality.
