= Musagitovo =

Musagitovo Мусагитово
- Village
- Location within Bashkortostan Location within Russia
- Coordinates: 54°16′N 55°20′E
- Country: Russia
- Region: Bashkortostan
- District: Davlekanovsky District
- Time zone: UTC+5:00

Musagitovo (Russian: Мусагитово; Bashkir: Мөсәғит, Mösäğit) is a rural locality (a village) in Imay-Karmalinsky Selsoviet, Davlekanovsky District, Bashkortostan, Russia. The population was 35 as of 2010. There is 1 street.

== Geography ==
Musagitovo is located 37 km northeast of Davlekanovo (the district's administrative centre) by road. Batraki is the nearest rural locality.
