= Imay-Karmaly =

Imay-Karmaly Имай-Кармалы
- Selo
- Location within Bashkortostan Location within Russia
- Coordinates: 54°13′N 55°23′E
- Country: Russia
- Region: Bashkortostan
- District: Davlekanovsky District
- Time zone: UTC+5:00

Imay-Karmaly (Russian: Имай-Кармалы; Bashkir: Имай-Ҡарамалы, İmay-Qaramalı) is a rural locality (a selo) and the administrative centre of Imay-Karmalinsky Selsoviet, Davlekanovsky District, Bashkortostan, Russia. The population was 330 as of 2010. There are 3 streets.

== Geography ==
Imay-Karmaly is located 30 km east of Davlekanovo (the district's administrative centre) by road. Tashlytamak is the nearest rural locality.
