= Almetovo =

Almetovo Альметово
- Village
- Location within Bashkortostan Location within Russia
- Coordinates: 54°10′N 54°16′E
- Country: Russia
- Region: Bashkortostan
- District: Davlekanovsky District
- Time zone: UTC+5:00

Almetovo (Russian: Альметово; Bashkir: Әлмәт, Älmät) is a rural locality (a village) in Bik-Karmalinsky Selsoviet, Davlekanovsky District, Bashkortostan, Russia. The population was 24 as of 2010. There is 1 street.

== Geography ==
Almetovo is located 19 km southeast of Davlekanovo (the district's administrative centre) by road. Rublevka is the nearest rural locality.
