= Kidryachevo =

Kidryachevo Кидрячево
- Selo
- Location within Bashkortostan Location within Russia
- Coordinates: 54°19′N 54°27′E
- Country: Russia
- Region: Bashkortostan
- District: Davlekanovsky District
- Time zone: UTC+5:00

Kidryachevo (Russian: Кидрячево; Bashkir: Ҡыҙрас, Qıźras) is a rural locality (a selo) and the administrative centre of Kidryachevsky Selsoviet, Davlekanovsky District, Bashkortostan, Russia. The population was 487 as of 2010. There are 5 streets.

== Geography ==
Kidryachevo is located 47 km west of Davlekanovo (the district's administrative centre) by road. Chapayevo is the nearest rural locality.
