= Kalinovka, Davlekanovsky District, Republic of Bashkortostan =

Kalinovka Калиновка
- Village
- Location within Bashkortostan Location within Russia
- Coordinates: 54°16′N 55°10′E
- Country: Russia
- Region: Bashkortostan
- District: Davlekanovsky District
- Time zone: UTC+5:00

Kalinovka (Russian: Калиновка) is a rural locality (a village) in Kazangulovsky Selsoviet, Davlekanovsky District, Bashkortostan, Russia. The population was 42 in 2010. There are two streets.

== Geography ==
Kalinovka is located 12 kilometres (7.5 mi) northeast of Davlekanovo (the district's administrative centre) by road. Ismagilovo is the nearest rural locality.
