= Raush, Davlekanovsky District, Republic of Bashkortostan =

Raush Рауш
- Khutor
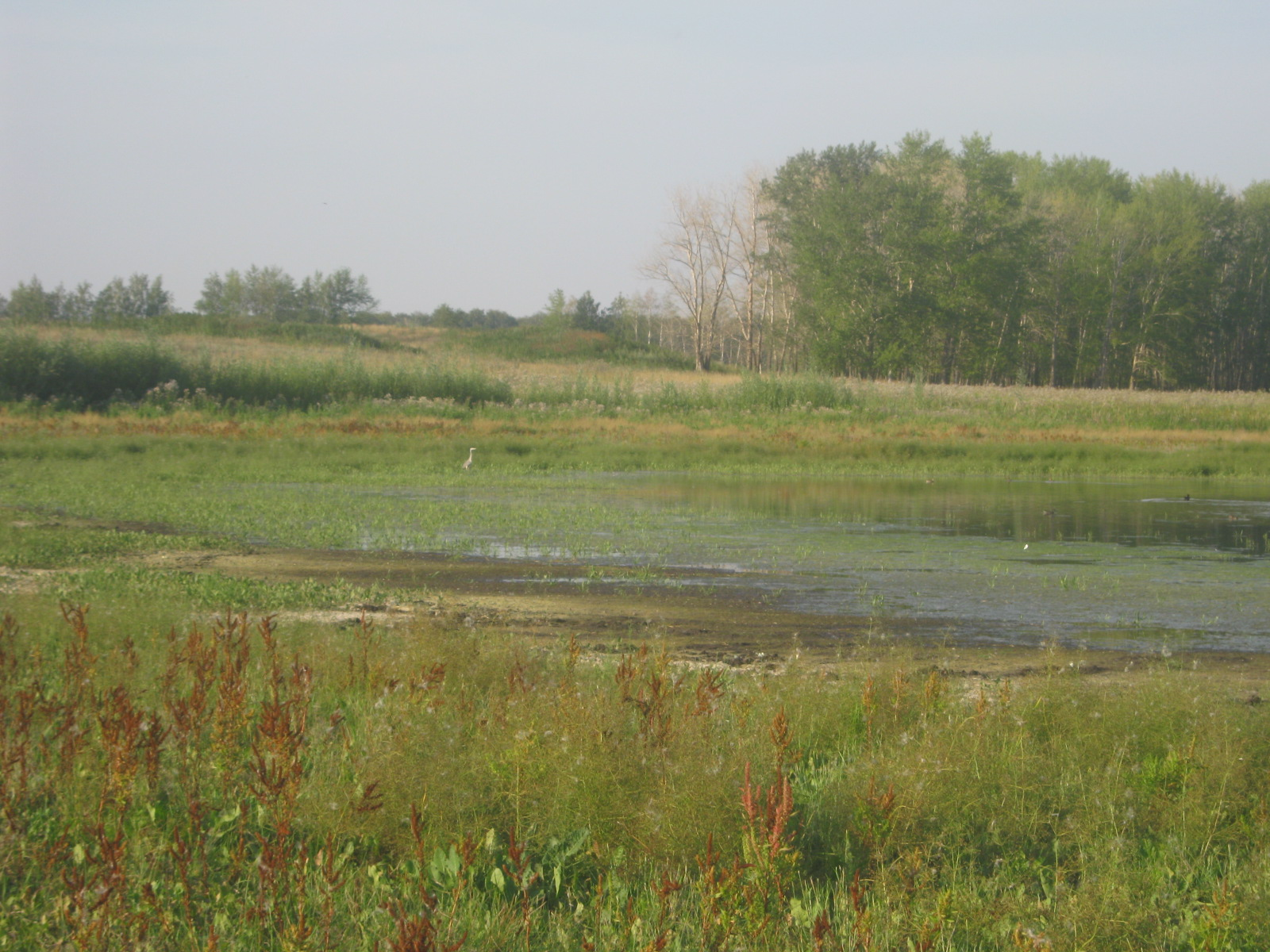

- Location within Bashkortostan Location within Russia
- Coordinates: 54°16′N 54°53′E
- Country: Russia
- Region: Bashkortostan
- District: Davlekanovsky District
- Time zone: UTC+5:00

Raush (Russian: Рауш; Bashkir: Рауш, Rauş) is a rural locality (a khutor) in Rassvetovsky Selsoviet, Davlekanovsky District, Bashkortostan, Russia. The population was 138 as of 2010. There are 2 streets.

== Geography ==
Raush is located 14 km northwest of Davlekanovo (the district's administrative centre) by road. Olgovka is the nearest rural locality.
