= Karanbash, Davlekanovsky District, Republic of Bashkortostan =

Karanbash Каранбаш
- Village
- Location within Bashkortostan Location within Russia
- Coordinates: 54°11′N 54°54′E
- Country: Russia
- Region: Bashkortostan
- District: Davlekanovsky District
- Time zone: UTC+5:00

Karanbash (Russian: Каранбаш; Bashkir: Ҡаранбаш, Qaranbaş) is a rural locality (a village) in Sergiopolsky Selsoviet, Davlekanovsky District, Bashkortostan, Russia. The population was 185 as of 2010. There are 2 streets.

== Geography ==
Karanbash is located 11 km southwest of Davlekanovo (the district's administrative centre) by road. Sergiopol is the nearest rural locality.
