= Novoyapparovo =

Novoyapparovo Новояппарово
- Selo
- Location within Bashkortostan Location within Russia
- Coordinates: 54°19′N 55°11′E
- Country: Russia
- Region: Bashkortostan
- District: Davlekanovsky District
- Time zone: UTC+5:00

Novoyapparovo (Russian: Новояппарово; Bashkir: Яңы Яппар, Yañı Yappar) is a rural locality (a selo) in Kazangulovsky Selsoviet, Davlekanovsky District, Bashkortostan, Russia. The population was 408 as of 2010. There are 2 streets.

== Geography ==
Novoyapparovo is located 18 km northeast of Davlekanovo (the district's administrative centre) by road. Staroyapparovo is the nearest rural locality.
