= Shestopalovka =

Shestopalovka Шестопаловка
- Village
- Location within Bashkortostan Location within Russia
- Coordinates: 54°17′N 54°41′E
- Country: Russia
- Region: Bashkortostan
- District: Davlekanovsky District
- Time zone: UTC+5:00

Shestopalovka (Russian: Шестопаловка) is a rural locality (a village) in Alginsky Selsoviet, Davlekanovsky District, Bashkortostan, Russia. The population was 67 as of 2010. There is 1 street.

== Geography ==
Shestopalovka is located 28 km northwest of Davlekanovo (the district's administrative centre) by road. Alga is the nearest rural locality.
