= Vperyod, Republic of Bashkortostan =

Vperyod Вперёд
- Selo
- Location within Bashkortostan Location within Russia
- Coordinates: 54°17′N 55°07′E
- Country: Russia
- Region: Bashkortostan
- District: Davlekanovsky District
- Time zone: UTC+5:00

Vperyod (Russian: Вперёд) is a rural locality (a selo) in Polyakovsky Selsoviet, Davlekanovsky District, Bashkortostan, Russia. The population was 957 as of 2010. There are 7 streets.

== Geography ==
Vperyod is located 12 km northeast of Davlekanovo (the district's administrative centre) by road. Mikhaylovka is the nearest rural locality.
