= Chuyunchi-Nikolayevka =

Chuyunchi-Nikolayevka Чуюнчи-Николаевка
- Selo
- Location within Bashkortostan Location within Russia
- Coordinates: 54°05′N 55°25′E
- Country: Russia
- Region: Bashkortostan
- District: Davlekanovsky District
- Time zone: UTC+5:00

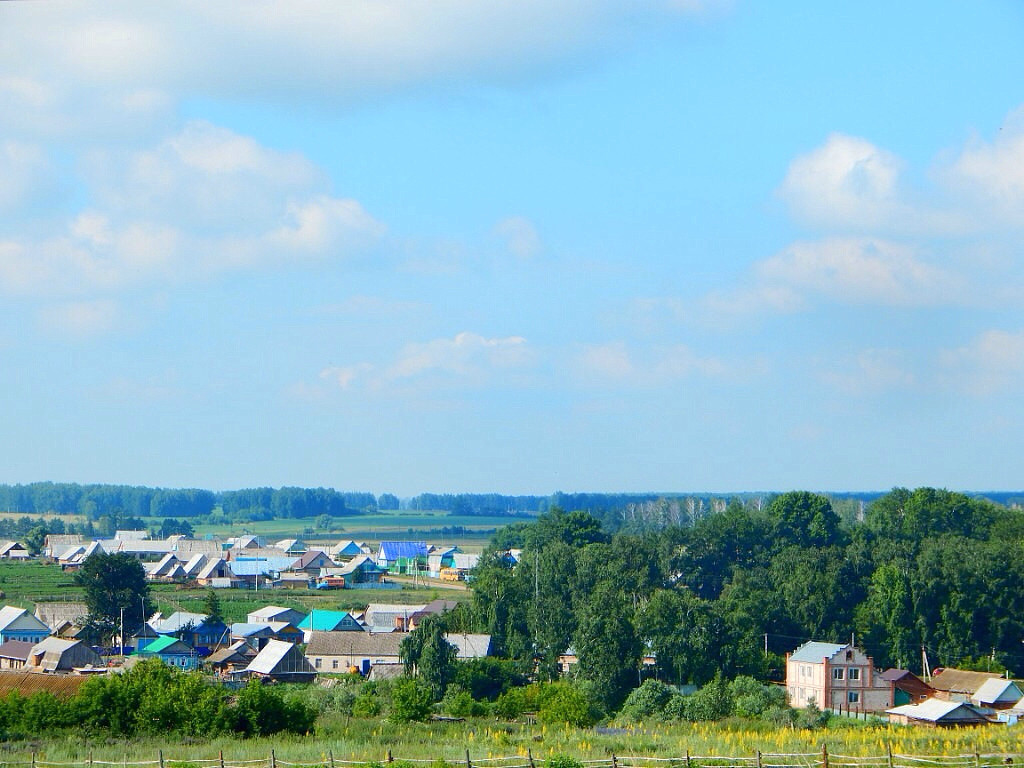
Chuyunchi-Nikolayevka, Davlyaken district

Chuyunchi-Nikolayevka (Russian: Чуюнчи-Николаевка; Bashkir: Суйынсы-Николаевка, Suyınsı-Nikolayevka) is a rural locality (a selo) in Chuyunchinsky Selsoviet, Davlekanovsky District, Bashkortostan, Russia. The population was 558 as of 2010. There are 7 streets.

== Geography ==
Chuyunchi-Nikolayevka is located 35 km southeast of Davlekanovo (the district's administrative centre) by road. Chuyunchi is the nearest rural locality.
