= Sokolovka, Davlekanovsky District, Republic of Bashkortostan =

Sokolovka Соколовка
- Village
- Location within Bashkortostan Location within Russia
- Coordinates: 54°12′N 55°07′E
- Country: Russia
- Region: Bashkortostan
- District: Davlekanovsky District
- Time zone: UTC+5:00

Sokolovka (Russian: Соколовка) is a rural locality (a village) and the administrative centre of Sokolovsky Selsoviet, Davlekanovsky District, Bashkortostan, Russia. The population was 514 as of 2010. There are 4 streets.

== Geography ==
Sokolovka is located 8 km southeast of Davlekanovo (the district's administrative centre) by road. Novosharipovo is the nearest rural locality.
