= Kazangulovo =

Kazangulovo Казангулово
- Selo
- Location within Bashkortostan Location within Russia
- Coordinates: 54°16′N 55°13′E
- Country: Russia
- Region: Bashkortostan
- District: Davlekanovsky District
- Time zone: UTC+5:00

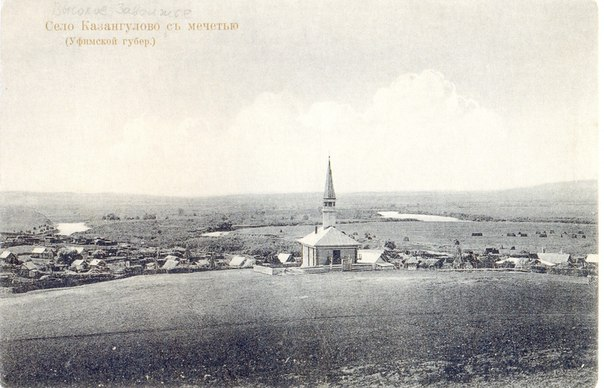

Kazangulovo (Russian: Казангулово; Bashkir: Ҡаҙанғол, Qaźanğol) is a rural locality (a selo) and the administrative centre of Kazangulovsky Selsoviet, Davlekanovsky District, Bashkortostan, Russia. The population was 441 as of 2010. There are 6 streets.

== Geography ==
Kazangulovo is located 20 km (12 mi) northeast of Davlekanovo (the district's administrative centre) by road. Kalinovka is the nearest rural locality.
