= Starokurmankeyevo =

Starokurmankeyevo Старокурманкеево
- Selo
- Location within Bashkortostan Location within Russia
- Coordinates: 54°11′N 55°02′E
- Country: Russia
- Region: Bashkortostan
- District: Davlekanovsky District
- Time zone: UTC+5:00

Starokurmankeyevo (Russian: Старокурманкеево; Bashkir: Иҫке Көрмәнкәй, İśke Körmänkäy) is a rural locality (a selo) in Kurmankeyevsky Selsoviet, Davlekanovsky District, Bashkortostan, Russia. The population was 315 as of 2010. There are 4 streets.

== Geography ==
Starokurmankeyevo is located 10 km south of Davlekanovo (the district's administrative centre) by road. Davlekanovo is the nearest rural locality.
