= Polyakovka =

Polyakovka Поляковка
- Selo
- Location within Bashkortostan Location within Russia
- Coordinates: 54°19′N 55°02′E
- Country: Russia
- Region: Bashkortostan
- District: Davlekanovsky District
- Time zone: UTC+5:00

Polyakovka (Russian: Поляковка) is a rural locality (a selo) and the administrative centre of Polyakovsky Selsoviet, Davlekanovsky District, Bashkortostan, Russia. The population was 384 as of 2010. There are 5 streets.

== Geography ==
Polyakovka is located 18 km north of Davlekanovo (the district's administrative centre) by road. Volynka is the nearest rural locality.
