= List of Heroes of the Russian Federation (G) =

This is a list of people who have been awarded the title Hero of the Russian Federation.

It has been awarded more than 970 times, of which more than 440 were posthumously.

== List of Heroes of the Russian Federation ==
- Nikolai Gavrilov (ru)
- Gapal Gadzhiev (ru)
- Gaydar Gadzhiev
- Nukhidin Gadzhiev (ru)
- Musa Gazimagomadov (ru)
- Magomed-Kazim Gayrkhanov (ru)
- Aleksey Galkin
- Grigory Galkin (ru)
- Aleksandr Galle (ru)
- Nikolai Galushkin
- Magomed Gamaztov (ru)
- Feodosy Ganus (ru)
- Pavel Gaponenko (ru)
- Artyom Garmash (ru)
- Aleksandr Garnaev (ru)
- Pyotr Geysler (ru)
- Erik Geptner (ru)
- Valery Gerasimov
- Magomet Gerbekov (ru)
- Aleksandr Gerdt (ru)
- Yuri Gidzenko
- Magomed Gimbatov (ru)
- Baatar Gindeev (ru)
- Viktor Glukharyov (ru)
- Aleksey Goynyak (ru)
- Dzhanibek Golaev
- Aleksandr Golovashkin (ru)
- Ivan Golubev (ru)
- Svyatoslav Golubyatnikov (ru)
- Valery Gorbenko (ru)
- Vladimir Gorbunov (ru)
- Vadim Gordeev (ru)
- Vitaly Gorin (ru)
- Valery Gorobets (ru)
- Anatoly Gorshkov (ru)
- Dmitry Gorshkov (ru)
- Yevgeny Goryunov (ru)
- Sergey Goryachev (ru)
- Dmitry Grebyonkin (ru)
- Konstantin Greblyuk (ru)
- Vladimir Grechanik (ru)
- Aleksandr Gribovsky (ru)
- Mikhail Grigorevsky (ru)
- Semyon Grigorenko (ru)
- Sergey Grigorov (ru)
- Dmitry Grigorev (ru)
- Vadim Gridnev (ru)
- Mikhail Gritsko (ru)
- Sergey Gritsyuk (ru)
- Anatoly Grishchenko (ru)
- Sergey Gromov (ru)
- Igor Grudnov (ru)
- Igor Gurov (ru)
- Georgy Guslyakov (ru)
- Andrey Gushchin (ru)

== See also ==
- Awards and decorations of the Russian Federation
- Awards and Emblems of the Ministry of Defense of the Russian Federation
- Awards of the Ministry of Internal Affairs of Russia
- Awards of the Federal Security Service of the Russian Federation
- Awards of the Federal Protective Service of the Russian Federation
- Awards of the Ministry for Emergency Situations of Russia
- Honorary titles of Russia
