= Ivangorod, Republic of Bashkortostan =

Ivangorod Ивангород
- Village
- Location within Bashkortostan Location within Russia
- Coordinates: 54°24′N 54°50′E
- Country: Russia
- Region: Bashkortostan
- District: Davlekanovsky District
- Time zone: UTC+5:00

Ivangorod (Russian: Ивангород) is a rural locality (a village) in Shestayevsky Selsoviet, Davlekanovsky District, Bashkortostan, Russia. The population was 377 as of 2010. There are 2 streets.

== Geography ==
Ivangorod is located 32 km north of Davlekanovo (the district's administrative centre) by road. Shestayevo is the nearest rural locality.
