= Chapayevo, Davlekanovsky District, Republic of Bashkortostan =

Chapayevo Чапаево
- Selo
- Location within Bashkortostan Location within Russia
- Coordinates: 54°20′N 54°29′E
- Country: Russia
- Region: Bashkortostan
- District: Davlekanovsky District
- Time zone: UTC+5:00

Chapayevo (Russian: Чапаево; Bashkir: Сапай, Sapay) is a rural locality (a selo) in Kidryachevsky Selsoviet, Davlekanovsky District, Bashkortostan, Russia. The population was 444 as of 2010. There are 3 streets.

== Geography ==
Chapayevo is located 47 km northwest of Davlekanovo (the district's administrative centre) by road. Kidryachevo is the nearest rural locality.
