= Alga, Alginsky Selsoviet, Davlekanovsky District, Republic of Bashkortostan =

Alga Алга
- Village
- Location within Bashkortostan Location within Russia
- Coordinates: 54°16′N 54°38′E
- Country: Russia
- Region: Bashkortostan
- District: Davlekanovsky District
- Time zone: UTC+5:00

Alga (Russian: Алга; Bashkir: Алға, Alğa) is a rural locality (a village) and the administrative center of Alginsky Selsoviet, Davlekanovsky District, Bashkortostan, Russia. The population was 295 as of 2010.
