= Chapayevo =

Chapayevo may refer to:

- Chapayevo, Kazakhstan, a village in Almaty Province of Kazakhstan
- Chapayevo, Russia, several rural localities in Russia
- Chapayevo Microdistrict, a microdistrict in the city of Kaliningrad, Kaliningrad Oblast, Russia
