= Sidorovka =

Sidorovka Сидоровка
- Village
- Location within Bashkortostan Location within Russia
- Coordinates: 54°20′N 55°03′E
- Country: Russia
- Region: Bashkortostan
- District: Davlekanovsky District
- Time zone: UTC+5:00

Sidorovka (Russian: Сидоровка) is a rural locality (a village) in Polyakovsky Selsoviet, Davlekanovsky District, Bashkortostan, Russia. The population was 52 as of 2010. There is 1 street.

== Geography ==
Sidorovka is located 21 km north of Davlekanovo (the district's administrative centre) by road. Balto-Ivanovka is the nearest rural locality.
