= Nikolai Galushkin =

Soviet military sniper (1922–2007)

- Николай Иванович Галушкин
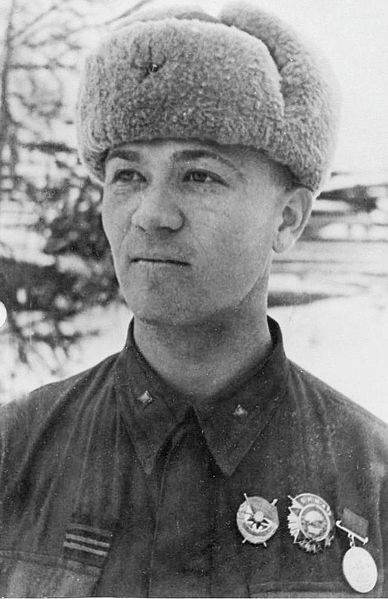
- Galushkin c.1943
- Born: 1917/1922 (Note: Galushkin's extact date of birth is unknown. Orphanage records list his date of birth as 22 January 1922, however following a retirement process in 1977, his date of birth was listed as 1 July 1917, which was the date engraved on his tombstone.); Taganrog (Note: According to orphanage records.)
- Died: May 18, 2007 (aged 85/89); Kirovo-Chepetsk, Russia
- Military career
- Allegiance: Soviet Union
- Branch: Red Army
- Service years: 1941–1946
- Rank: Lieutenant
- Conflicts: World War II
- Awards: Hero of the Russian Federation

Nikolai Ivanovich Galushkin (Note: Russian: Николай Иванович Галушкин) (born 1917/1922 (Note: Galushkin's extact date of birth is unknown. Orphanage records list his date of birth as 22 January 1922, however following a retirement process in 1977, his date of birth was listed as 1 July 1917, which was the date engraved on his tombstone.) – 18 May 2007) was a Soviet military sniper during World War II in the Eastern Front. He is reported to have killed over 400 enemy soldiers whilst serving in the 50th Rifle Division.

Despite tallying 418 reported kills during the war and being nominated for the title of Hero of the Soviet Union on two occasions, he did not receive the title, and was instead awarded the Order of Lenin for his achievements as a sniper until being awarded the title Hero of the Russian Federation on June 21, 1995.

== Early life ==
Galushkin's exact date and place of birth is unknown. His parents are believed to have died during the Russian Civil War and he was raised in an orphanage, from which he ran away in July 1926 and later lived with a rural family who went on to give to an orphanage in Armavir before finally being transferred to the K.Y. Voroshilov Orphanage in Vyatka.

At the orphanage, records list Galushkin’s date of birth as 22 January 1922 in Taganrog, however following a process in 1977, which established his retirement age, his date of birth was listed as 1 July 1917, which was the date engraved on his tombstone.

Whilst living in the orphanage as a child, Galushkin was a member of a shooting club, and at a young age was distinguished for his marksmanship and skill. From 1936, he worked at a child labour colony. In the late 1930s, he completed a course for projectionists in Gorky (now Nizhny Novgorod) and then worked in Nolinsk, where he operated movie projectors showing the first Soviet sound films.

== Eastern Front service ==
On June 22, 1941, the Eastern Front of World War II began and Galushkin was drafted into the Red Army at an Omutninsky District enlistment office in October of the same year to fight against enemy combatants in Moscow in January, where he was soon wounded in the arm and recovered following treatment.

On April 26, 1942, while en route to the front line, Galushkin was lightly wounded on the elbow during an air strike and he finally returned to the front in May, where he was now assigned to serve as a sniper for the 1st Battalion of the 49th Rifle Regiment of the 50th Rifle Division of the 33rd Army of the Western Front. In June, Galushkin was wounded a third time, by shrapnel in the right buttock.

By order of the 5th Army, Galushkin was awarded the Medal "For Courage" on July 13, 1942, the nomination for the award noted that Galushkin was “at his firing point from morning until late at night and did not stop observing the battlefield for a minute".

On October 30, 1942, Galushkin was awarded the Order of the Red Banner. The award sheet noted that by September 20, the sniper had brought the number of enemy soldiers killed to 115. In the battle on September 29, 1942, Galushkin wounded one and killed two enemy soldiers, and then, while trying to remove their bodies, killed eight more German infantrymen.

In 1942, he joined the All-Union Communist Party (Bolsheviks), and party cards were handed to him and other fighters directly at their combat positions. In January 1943, he was awarded the Order of the Red Banner of the Mongolian People's Republic; Among the 24 distinguished Red Army soldiers, Galushkin was invited to the front headquarters, located at the Balabanovo station near Maloyaroslavets, where a meeting was held with a delegation from Mongolia. In addition to Galushkin, orders were awarded to the front commander, Colonel General I. S. Konev and member of the front Military Council N. A. Bulganin. Subsequently, Nikolai Ivanovich recalled:

Konev asked me to stay. He asked where I was from, where I learned how to shoot like that. And he offers to send me to a military school – they say he showed leadership abilities. I answer: “Comrade General, excuse me, but I have already entered the academy.” – “Which academy?” – “Yes, to the one where our brothers and sisters fight, defending their homeland.” – "Well done!" – That’s all Konev said. And when I arrive at my unit, a dispatch follows: to assign Private Galushkin the rank of junior lieutenant.

In February 1943, he was one of the first to cross the Seversky Donets River with a group of fighters. On June 4, 1943, rifle platoon commander Galushkin organized a “group hunt” – 6 snipers actually defeated a unit of the 333rd German division in the village of Sidorovka. In his diary, he writes that in five hours of battle, 36 enemy soldiers and officers were destroyed (and he personally killed 14 of them), 3 ammunition warehouses, one stable and 3 officers’ houses. According to the sniper's records, in the battle on July 17, 1943, he killed 32 German soldiers, and with his colleagues, they managed to capture a German tank and drive it to the location of Soviet troops.

Soon, several newspapers repeatedly published notes and articles dedicated to him and other soldiers of the 49th Infantry Regiment. The German command appointed a reward for the sniper's integrity, Wehrmacht soldiers and officers were warned of increased danger in those areas where Galushkin and his fighters operated. Nikolai Ivanovich said, with announcer Yuri Levitan, during a personal meeting with him years after the end of the war, admitted that he remembered the sniper’s name for the "rest of his life", repeatedly repeating it on the radio in Sovinformburo reports.

On July 19, during the next “hunt,” two German machine gunners stunned and subdued a sniper; in the same battle, Galushkin’s partner, Sergeant Taras Sadzhaya, was also wounded. The submachine gunners searched Galushkin, and did not notice that a grenade and a pistol were hidden under his camouflage robe. Later, the lieutenant took out a grenade and threw it at the German soldier walking behind him, and fired a pistol at the one walking in front. Galushkin began to search the machine gunners, at that moment one of them woke up and shot the sniper in the stomach with a machine gun. “As I held the gun, I fired all the bullets at him. I got up and fell. I can't crawl either. Fainting,” Nikolai Ivanovich later recalled. Galushkin lay unconscious for several hours until his body was discovered by Soviet soldiers.

Soon, the commander of the Southwestern Front, Rodion Yakovlevich Malinovsky, future minister of defence, ordered Galushkin to be nominated for the title of Hero of the Soviet Union. In a submission dated June 26, 1943, signed by the commander of the 49th Infantry Regiment on June 26, 1943, it was noted that he had killed 225 enemy soldiers and officers in his combat account, and also trained 38 snipers who “have dozens of destroyed Germans". By decree of the Presidium of the Supreme Soviet of the USSR of October 26, 1943, Nikolai Ivanovich was awarded the Order of Lenin.

Lieutenant Galushkin is famous at the front as a master of accurate fire. In all types of combat he exhibits high activity as a sniper. [...] Lieutenant Galushkin is a skilled teacher of snipers. The other day, the sniper training camp he led ended. 50 precision shooting masters were trained at the training camp.

— Newspaper “Red Star”, No. 305 dated December 27, 1944

After an operation, Galushkin was evacuated to the rear and was treated at a military hospital in Balashov. In his diary, Nikolai Ivanovich notes that until October 1, 1943, he was treated by Olga Petrovna Kotovskaya, the wife of the Civil War military leader G.I. Kotovsky, who at that time served in the hospital with the rank of major in the medical service. Already on October 1, Galushkin left for the front; by October 20, he caught up with his unit near Krivoy Rog.

Many soldiers of the 49th Infantry Regiment died, including Sergeant Sajaya. On October 26, 1943, Nikolai Ivanovich wrote in his diary: “I learned that my best comrades were killed”.

After returning to the active army, Galushkin took part in battles in Ukraine and Eastern Europe, including the liberation of Kirovograd and the capture of the city of Iași, and was wounded three times. In his diary, he writes that in the period from April 12 to July 15, 1944, he managed to train 72 snipers.

By May 1945, Lieutenant Galushkin was the commander of a platoon of 50-mm mortars of the 49th Infantry Regiment. As noted in the award documents, during the battles from April 16 to 21, 1945, during the crossing of the Neisse River and breaking through German defenses in the area of the village of Zentendorf, as well as in the final battles from May 5 to 7, 1945. While feeling unwell after being wounded, he led the unit's snipers and, while in combat formations, destroyed important enemy targets. By order of the 73rd Silesian Rifle Corps No. 76/n dated May 23, 1945, he was awarded the Order of the Patriotic War, 1st degree.

Nikolai Ivanovich Galushkin ended the war with his regiment in Prague.

== Post-war ==
After demobilization in 1946, Galushkin returned to the Kirov Oblast. Over the years, he worked in film production, was a dispatcher at a construction site, and also a photographer at the Borovitsa holiday home in Kirovo-Chepetsk. He took part in the work in veterans councils and Komsomol, worked in the local branch of DOSAAF and conducted patriotic work among schoolchildren in the Kirov region. For his active personal participation in military patronage work, he was awarded a diploma by the Ural Military District.

Awarding Galushkin the title of Hero of the Russian Federation was open as a possibility for many years. After the celebration of the 20th anniversary of the victory in the war, the former commander of the 49th Rifle Division, Admiral Nikolai Kharlamov addressed a letter personally to the Minister of Defense Rodion Malinovsky, but in 1967 the Minister died and the letter remained unanswered.

A lawyer, Colonel of Justice L. L. Fedorov, voiced support to award Galushkin the title and repeatedly sent inquiries to the Awards Department of the Main Directorate of Personnel of the USSR asking them to properly evaluate Galushkin activities during the war. Petitions of this kind were also submitted by other commanders and colonels of the 50th Rifle Division. Only in 1995, by decree of the President of Russia Boris Yeltsin, Galushkin was awarded the title of Hero of the Russian Federation. The award was solemnly presented to Galushkin on February 23, 1996 in Kirov.

== Personal life and death ==
External image
- Galushkin's tombstone in Kirovo-Chepetsk

Galushkin was married to Nadezhda Aleksandrovna Galushkina for 55 years; she died in 1995. Together, the couple raised two sons – Valery and Alexander.

Galushkin died on May 18, 2007. He was buried in Kirovo-Chepetsk.

== Awards ==
Galushkin was awarded a number of Soviet, Russian and foreign state awards and titles, including:

- Hero of the Russian Federation (Decree of the President of the Russian Federation of June 21, 1995) - “for courage and heroism displayed in the fight against the Nazi invaders in the Great Patriotic War of 1941-1945”
- Order of Lenin (October 26, 1943)
- Order of the Red Banner (October 30, 1942)
- Two Orders of the Patriotic War (May 23, 1945, March 11, 1985)
- Medal "For Courage" (July 13, 1942)
- Medal "For the Victory over Germany in the Great Patriotic War of 1941-1945"
- Order of the Red Banner of the Mongolian People's Republic (1943)
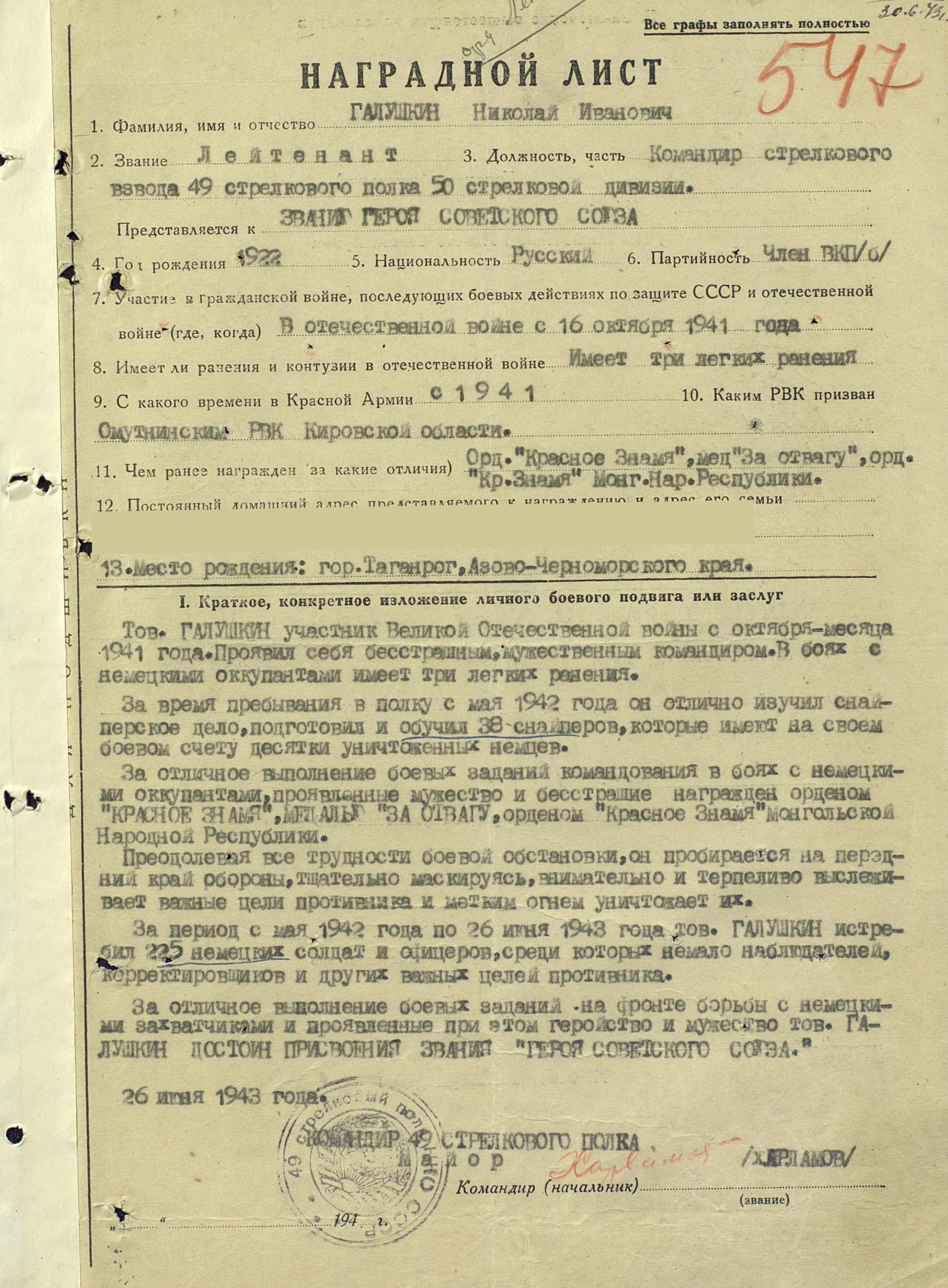
Nomination for the Hero of the Soviet Union, 26 June 1943

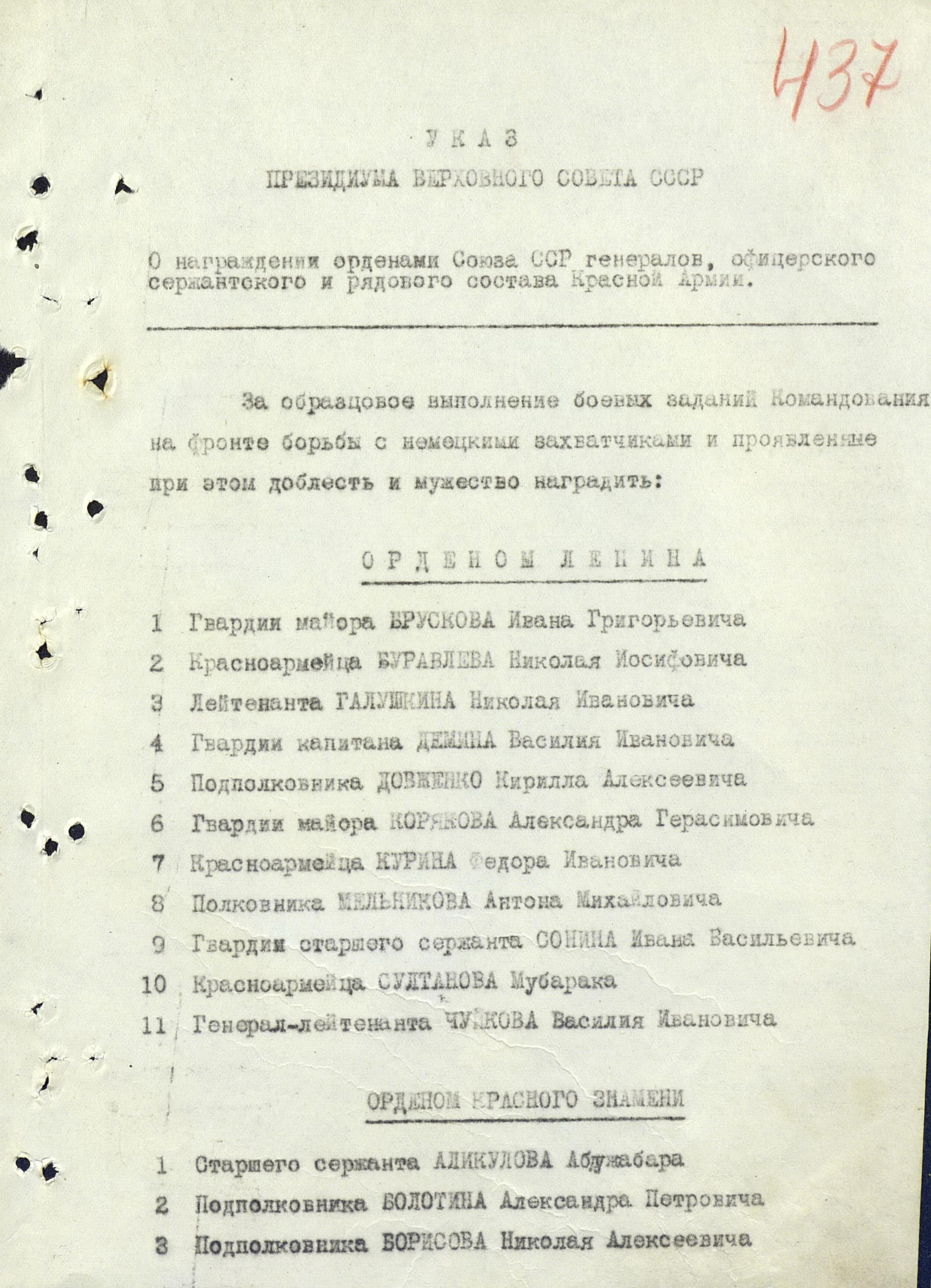
Portion of the Decree of the President of the USSR of 26 October 1943

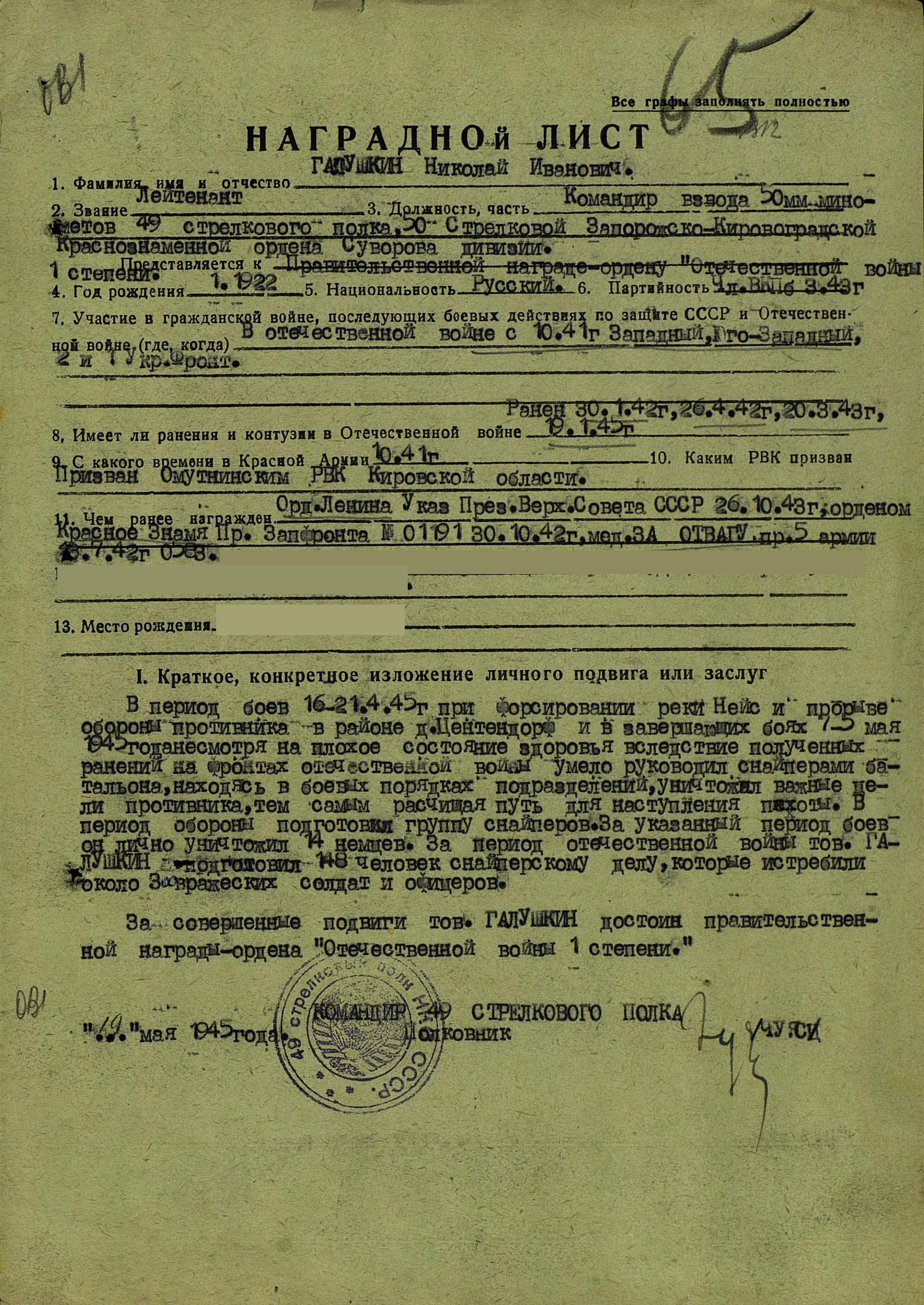
Nomination for the Order of the Patriotic War, 1st degree, 19 May 1945

== Honours ==
- On 6 May 2011, a memorial plaque dedicated to Galushkin was ceremoniously unveiled at 59 Mira Avenue in Kirovo-Chepetsk, where he lived.
- The Kirov Museum of Military Glory houses a diary and a personalized sniper rifle numbered 3947, given to him by Rodion Malinovsky, as well as Galushkin's ghillie suit, with traces of his blood from being wounded.
- An exhibition is dedicated to Galushkin in the Kirovo-Chepetsk City Museum and Exhibition Center.
- In Kirov and Kirovo-Chepetsk, youth shooting ranges hold annual tournaments and competitions for the N. I. Galushkin Prize, named after Galushkin.

== See also ==
- List of Heroes of the Russian Federation
