= Chapayevka, Russia =

Chapayevka (Russian: Чапаевка) is the name of several rural localities in Russia.

== Modern localities ==
- Chapayevka, Chelyabinsk Oblast, a village in Kamyshevsky Selsoviet of Argayashsky District in Chelyabinsk Oblast
- Chapayevka, Chuvash Republic, a settlement in Pervomayskoye Rural Settlement of Alatyrsky District in the Chuvash Republic
- Chapayevka, Republic of Crimea, a selo in Sovetsky District of the Republic of Crimea
- Chapayevka, Kaluga Oblast, a village in Dzerzhinsky District of Kaluga Oblast
- Chapayevka, Moscow Oblast, a village in Nikolskoye Rural Settlement of Odintsovsky District in Moscow Oblast; 55°36′N 36°39′E
- Chapayevka, Grachyovsky District, Orenburg Oblast, a settlement in Klyuchevsky Selsoviet of Grachyovsky District in Orenburg Oblast
- Chapayevka, Kvarkensky District, Orenburg Oblast, a selo in Tanalyksky Selsoviet of Kvarkensky District in Orenburg Oblast
- Chapayevka, Novoorsky District, Orenburg Oblast, a selo in Chapayevsky Selsoviet of Novoorsky District in Orenburg Oblast
- Chapayevka, Pervomaysky District, Orenburg Oblast, a settlement in Leninsky Selsoviet of Pervomaysky District in Orenburg Oblast
- Chapayevka, Samara Oblast, a settlement in Volzhsky District of Samara Oblast
- Chapayevka, Marksovsky District, Saratov Oblast, a settlement in Marksovsky District of Saratov Oblast
- Chapayevka, Turkovsky District, Saratov Oblast, a village in Turkovsky District of Saratov Oblast
- Chapayevka, Yershovsky District, Saratov Oblast, a selo in Yershovsky District of Saratov Oblast

== Alternative names ==
- Chapayevka, alternative name of Chapayev, a settlement in Novovyselsky Selsoviet of Zubovo-Polyansky District in the Republic of Mordovia; 54°1′N 42°58′E
- Chapayevka, alternative name of Chapayev, a khutor in Bogurayevskoye Rural Settlement of Belokalitvinsky District in Rostov Oblast; 48°3′N 40°47′E
