= Pervomaysky, Pervomaysky District, Orenburg Oblast =

Rural locality in Orenburg Oblast, Russia

Pervomaysky Первомайский
- Posyolok
- Interactive map of Pervomaysky
- Location within Orenburg Oblast Location within European Russia Location within Russia
- Coordinates: 51°32′07″N 55°00′21″E
- Country: Russia
- Federal subject: Orenburg Oblast

Population
  - Estimate (2021): 5,959 )
- Time zone: UTC+5 (MSK+2)
- Postal code: 461980
- OKTMO ID: 53636415101

Pervomaysky (Russian: Первомайский) is a rural locality (a settlement) and the administrative center of Pervomaysky District, Orenburg Oblast, Russia. Population: 6,346 (2010 census); 6,576 (2002 census); 4,025 (1989 Soviet census).
