= Chapayevo, Tuymazinsky District, Republic of Bashkortostan =

Chapayevo Чапаево
- Village
- Location within Bashkortostan Location within Russia
- Coordinates: 54°19′N 53°38′E
- Country: Russia
- Region: Bashkortostan
- District: Tuymazinsky District
- Time zone: UTC+5:00

Chapayevo (Russian: Чапаево) is a rural locality (a village) in Verkhnetroitsky Selsoviet, Tuymazinsky District, Bashkortostan, Russia. The population was 56 as of 2010. There is 1 street.

== Geography ==
Chapayevo is located 37 km south of Tuymazy (the district's administrative centre) by road. Nizhnetroitsky is the nearest rural locality.
