= Pervomaysky District, Orenburg Oblast =

Pervomaysky District Первомайский район (Russian)
- District
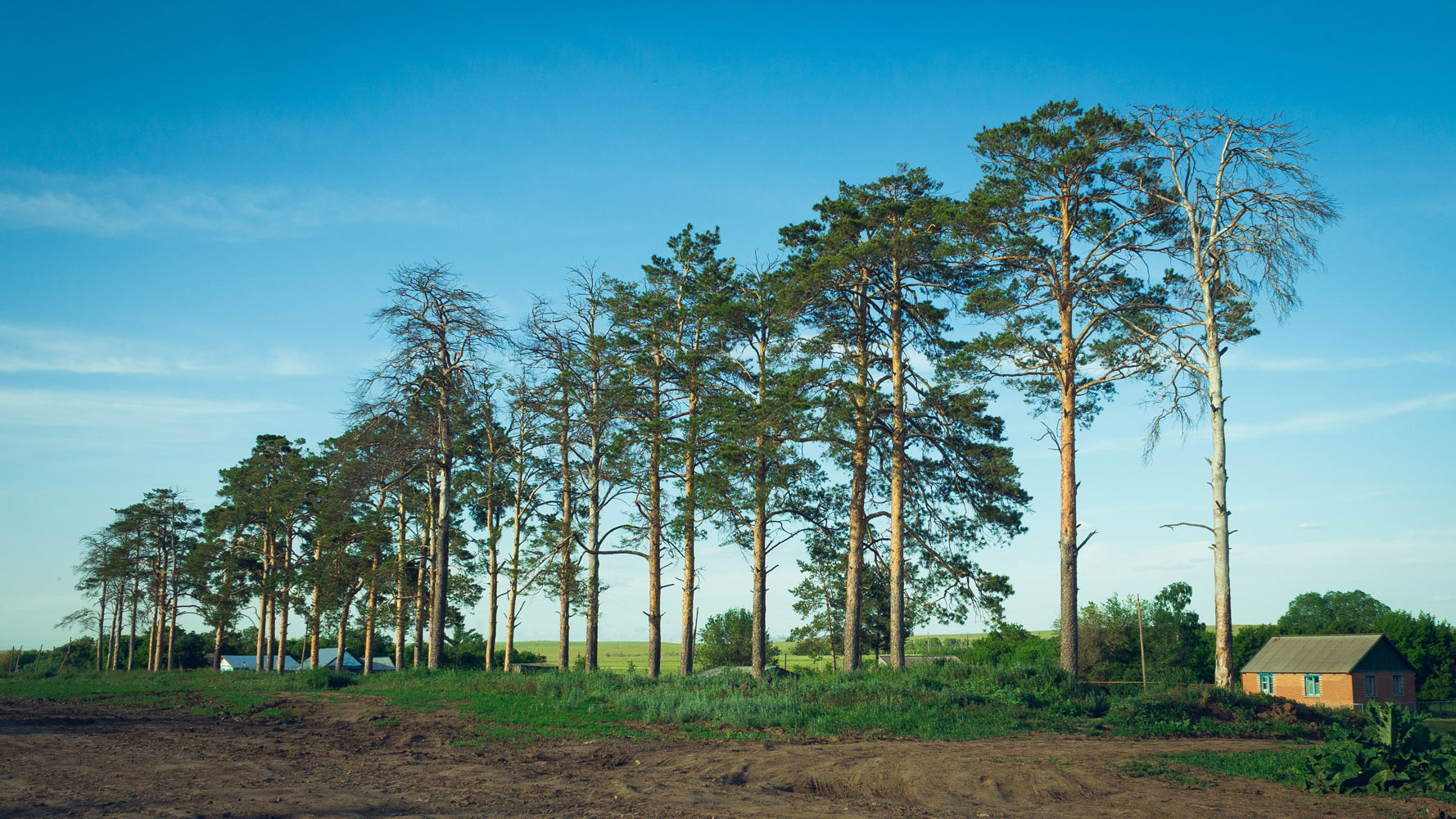
- Nazarovsky Pine, Pervomaysky District

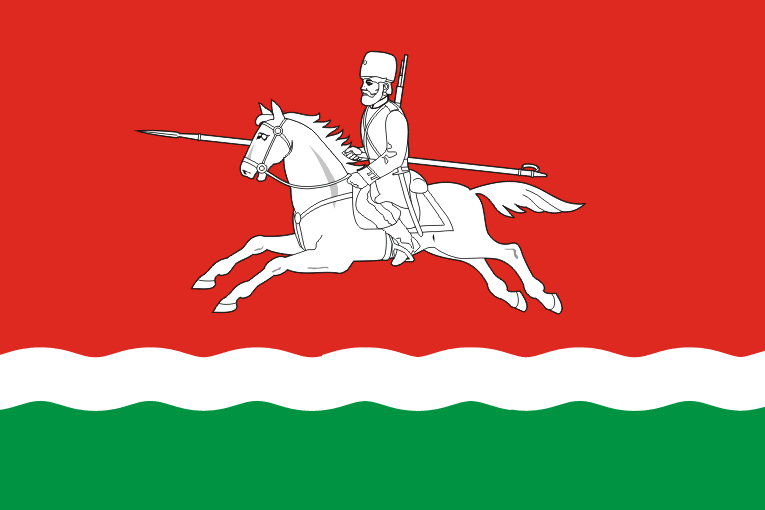
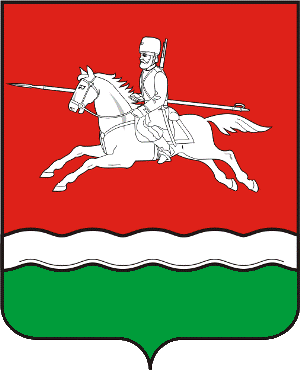
- Flag Coat of arms
- Location of Pervomaysky District in Orenburg Oblast
- Coordinates: 51°32′10″N 54°59′56″E
- Country: Russia
- Federal subject: Orenburg Oblast
- Established: 1928
- Administrative center: Pervomaysky

Area
  - Total: 5,055 km^{2} (1,952 sq mi)

Population (2010 Census)
  - Total: 25,626
  - Density: 5.069/km^{2} (13.13/sq mi)
  - Urban: 0%
  - Rural: 100%

Administrative structure
  - Administrative divisions: 16 Selsoviets
  - Inhabited localities: 58 rural localities

Municipal structure
  - Municipally incorporated as: Pervomaysky Municipal District
  - Municipal divisions: 0 urban settlements, 15 rural settlements
- Time zone: UTC+5 (MSK+2)
- OKTMO ID: 53636000
- Website: http://www.pervomay.orb.ru

Pervomaysky District (Russian: Первома́йский райо́н; Kazakh: Первомай ауданы, Permovaı aýdany) is an administrative and municipal district (raion), one of the thirty-five in Orenburg Oblast, Russia. It is located in the southwest of the oblast. The area of the district is 5,055 square kilometers (1,952 sq mi). Its administrative center is the rural locality (a settlement) of Pervomaysky. Population: 25,626 (2010 Census); 30,161 (2002 census); 25,153 (1989 Soviet census). The population of the administrative center accounts for 24.8% of the total district's population.
