= Dzhanibek Golaev =

Dzhanibek Nanakovich Golaev
- Джанибек Нанакович Голаев
- Born: 1917; Khasaut (located within present-day Kuban Oblast)
- Died: 26 September 1943 (aged 25–26); Pryluky Raion, Ukrainian SSR, USSR
- Military career
- Allegiance: Soviet Union
- Branch: Soviet Air Force
- Service years: 1938 – 1943
- Rank: Lieutenant
- Conflicts: World War II
- Awards: Hero of the Russian Federation

Dzhanibek Nanakovich Golaev (Russian: Джанибек Нанакович Голаев; 1917 – 26 September 1943) was a Karachay flying ace in the Soviet Air Forces. Killed in action on the Eastern Front of the World War II, he was posthumously awarded the title of the Hero of the Russian Federation in 1995.

== Early life ==
Golaev was born in 1917 in Khasaut aul (village) of Batalpashinsky otdel, Kuban Oblast (located within — Karachay-Cherkessia). He was conscripted in 1938. Golaev completed training as a pilot, graduating on 18 June 1941.

== World War II ==
From August 1942, Golaev was in frontline service. He participated in the Battle of Kursk (63 missions), took part in 23 air battles, and shot down 9 planes. He later fought in the Battle of the Dnieper, notably downing four planes on September 9, 1943. He was wounded twice. He died on September 25, 1943, during the bombing of a Soviet aerodrome near Pryluky. While attempting to save the aircraft from burning, Golaev was mortally wounded and passed away the following day. He was buried in a mass grave in the central square of Pryluky

At the time of his death, Golaev was in command of a squadron of 32nd Fighter Aviation Regiment of 256th Fighter Aviation Division of 2nd Air Army. In total, he participated in 102 war missions, 39 air battles, and shot down 15 planes. Some sources think that Golaev was denied the Hero of the Soviet Union because of his nationality.

== Honours ==
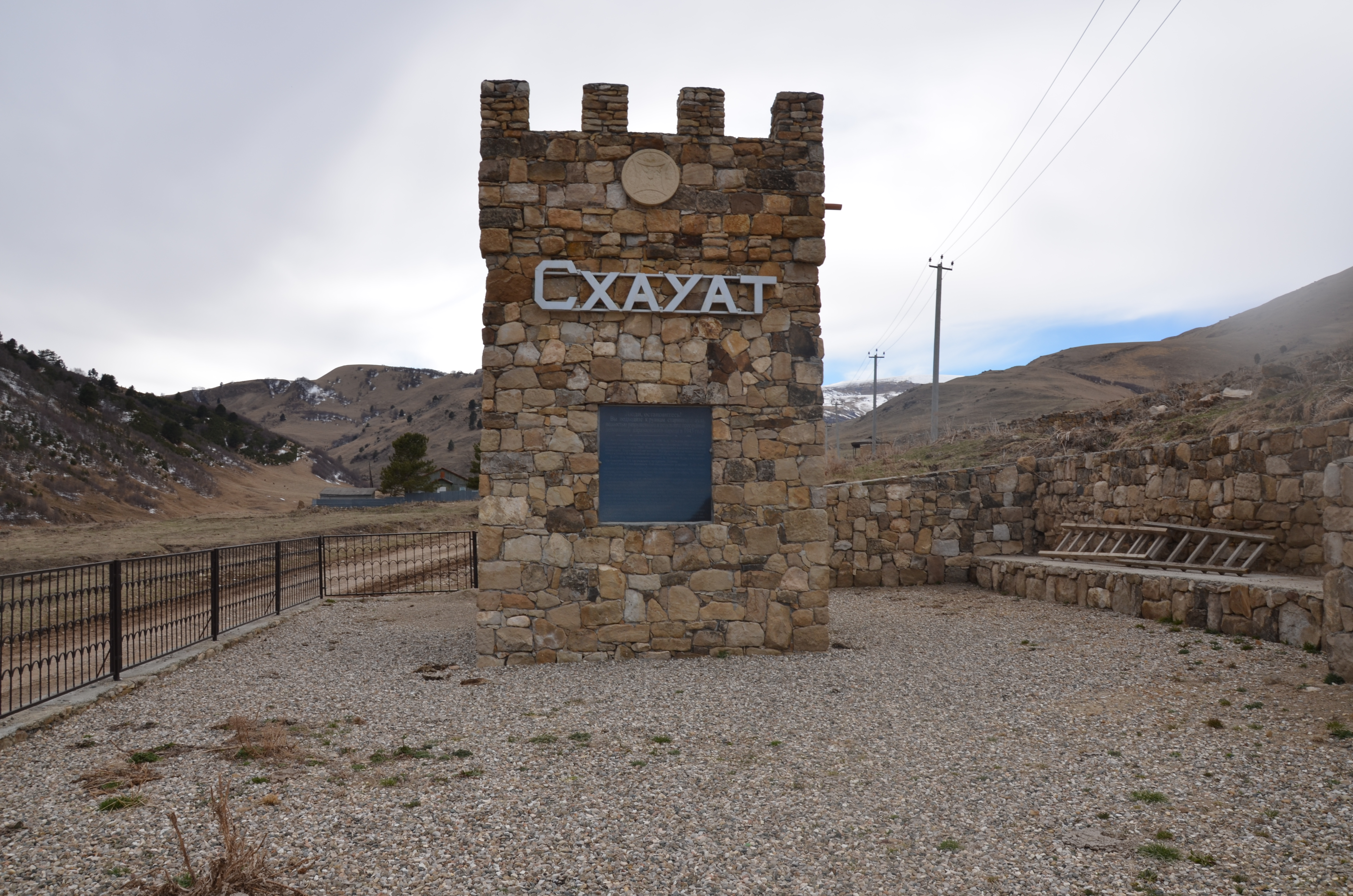
Monument in Khasaut commemorating its residents, including Golaev, who fought in World War II

- Presidential degree of September 7, 1995 awarded Golaev title of the Hero of the Russian Federation, for «bravery and heroism that he has shown in fighting against German-fascist invaders in the Great Patriotic war of 1941-1945». The award was bestowed posthumously.
- He was also awarded the Order of the Red Banner and Order of the Red Star.

== Commemoration ==
- A street in Kichy-Balyk, Golaev's hometown, was named in his honour.

== See also ==
- List of Heroes of the Russian Federation
