= Chapayevo, Astrakhan Oblast =

Chapayevo Чапаево
- Selo
- Location within Astrakhan Oblast Location within Russia
- Coordinates: 45°58′N 48°16′E
- Country: Russia
- Region: Astrakhan Oblast
- District: Kamyzyaksky District
- Time zone: UTC+4:00

Chapayevo (Russian: Чапаево) is a rural locality (a selo) in Karalatsky Selsoviet, Kamyzyaksky District, Astrakhan Oblast, Russia. The population was 450 as of 2010. There are 11 streets.

== Geography ==
Chapayevo is located 25 km southeast of Kamyzyak (the district's administrative centre) by road. Revin-Khutor is the nearest rural locality.
