= Chapayevo, Kazakhstan =

Chapayevo
- Location in Kazakhstan
- Coordinates: 43°28′20″N 76°48′26″E
- Country: Kazakhstan
- Region: Almaty Region
- Time zone: UTC+6 (Omsk Time)

Chapayevo is a village in Almaty Region of south-eastern Kazakhstan.
