= Davlekanovo =

Town in Bashkortostan, Russia

Davlekanovo Давлеканово
- Town

Other transcription(s)
  - Bashkir: Дәүләкән; Däwläkän
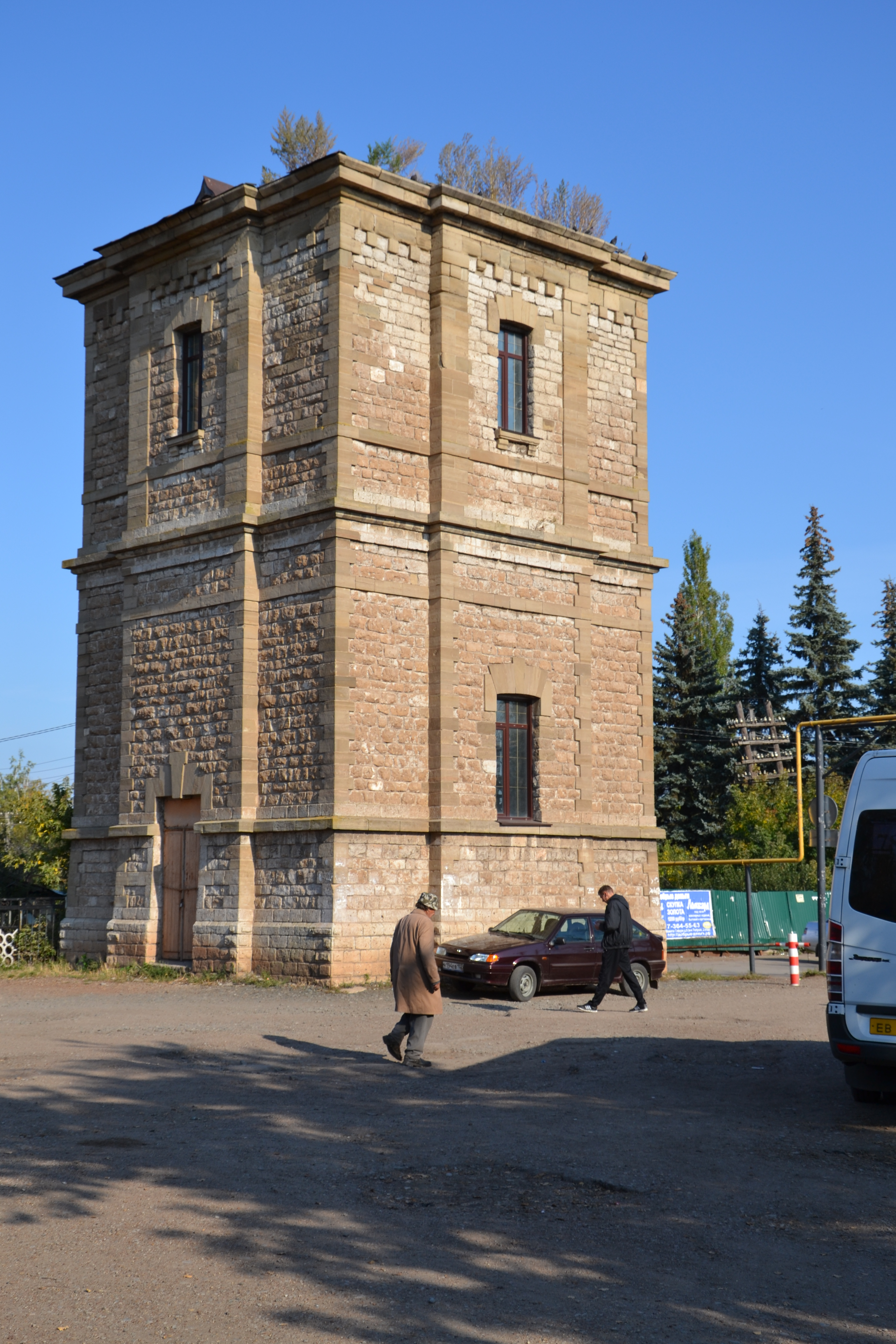

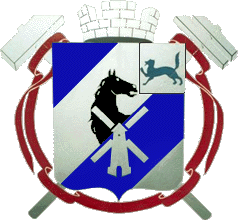
- Coat of arms
- Interactive map of Davlekanovo
- Location of Davlekanovo Davlekanovo (Bashkortostan)
- Coordinates: 54°13′N 55°02′E
- Country: Russia
- Federal subject: Bashkortostan
- Known since: mid-18th century
- Town status since: 1942
- Elevation: 110 m (360 ft)

Population (2010 Census)
  - Total: 24,073
  - Estimate (2021): 21,834 (−9.3%)

Administrative status
  - Subordinated to: town of republic significance of Davlekanovo
  - Capital of: Davlekanovsky District, town of republic significance of Davlekanovo

Municipal status
  - Municipal district: Davlekanovsky Municipal District
  - Urban settlement: Davlekanovo Urban Settlement
  - Capital of: Davlekanovsky Municipal District, Davlekanovo Urban Settlement
- Time zone: UTC+5 (MSK+2)
- Postal code: 453400–453409
- OKTMO ID: 80622101001

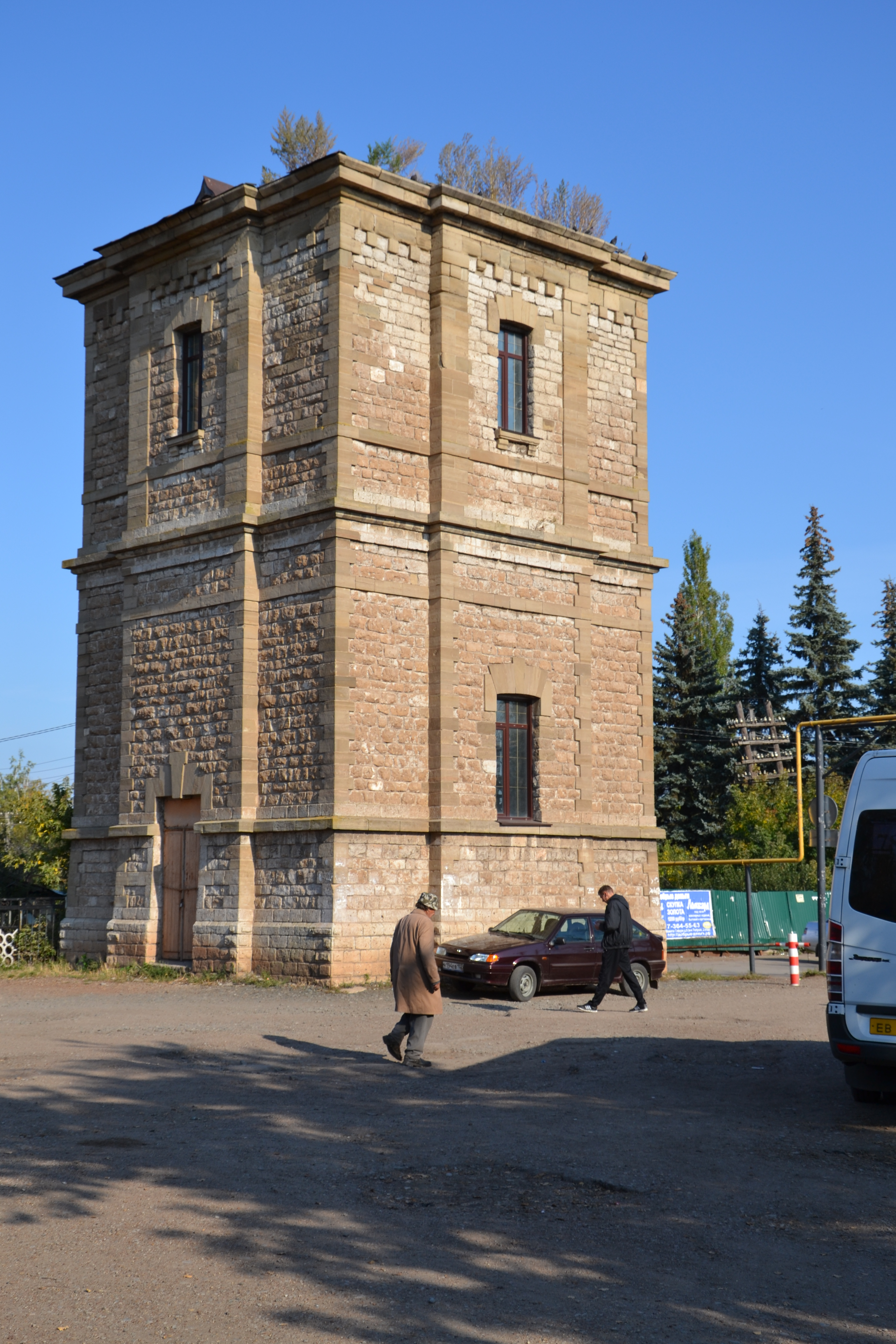
Water tower at the station square

Davlekanovo (Russian: Давлеканово; Bashkir: Дәүләкән, Däwläkän) is a town in the Republic of Bashkortostan, Russia, located on the Dyoma River 90 kilometers (56 mi) west of Ufa. Population: 24,073 (2010 census); 23,860 (2002 census); 21,911 (1989 Soviet census). It was previously known as Itkulovo.

== History ==
In the mid-18th century it was called Itkulovo (Иткулово); later renamed Davlekanovo. Urban-type settlement status was granted to it in 1928 and town status was granted in 1942.

== Administrative and municipal status ==
Within the framework of administrative divisions, Davlekanovo serves as the administrative center of Davlekanovsky District, even though it is not a part of it. As an administrative division, it is incorporated separately as the town of republic significance of Davlekanovo—an administrative unit with the status equal to that of the districts. As a municipal division, the town of republic significance of Davlekanovo is incorporated within Davlekanovsky Municipal District as Davlekanovo Urban Settlement.

== Climate ==
The average annual temperature is 3.8 °C (38.8 °F), ranging from −11.7 °C (10.9 °F) in January to 20.6 °C (69.1 °F) in July.

== Demographics ==
Ethnic composition:

- Russians: 36%
- Bashkirs: 32%
- Tatars: 20%
- Chuvash people: 5%
- Ukrainians: 5%
- others: 2%
