= Davlekanovsky District =

Davlekanovsky District Давлекановский район (Russian)
- District

Other transcription(s)
  - Bashkir: Дәүләкән районы
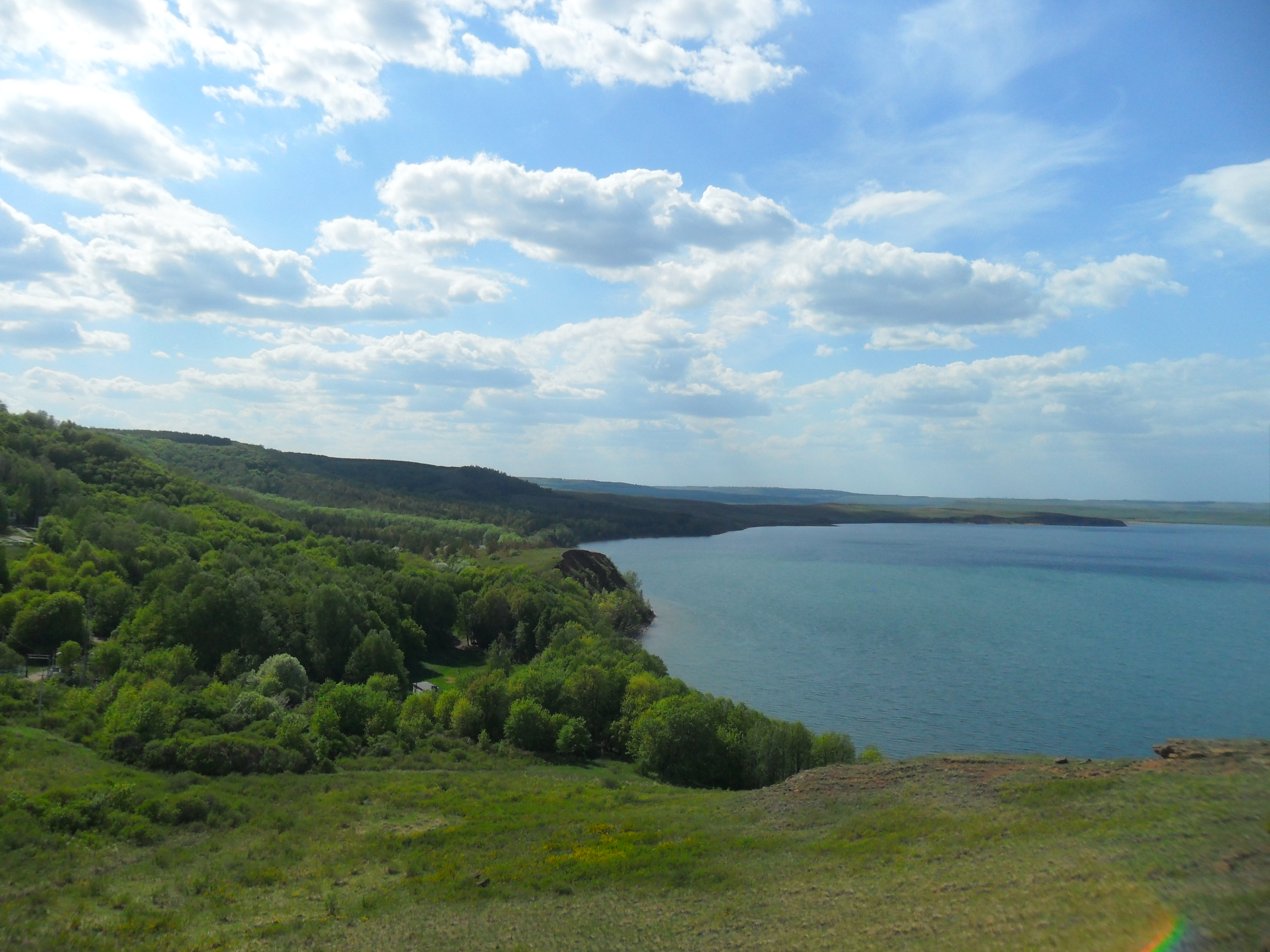
- Lake Asylykyul, Davlekanovsky District

- Flag Coat of arms
- Location of Davlekanovsky District in the Republic of Bashkortostan
- Coordinates: 54°13′N 55°02′E
- Country: Russia
- Federal subject: Republic of Bashkortostan
- Established: August 20, 1930
- Administrative center: Davlekanovo

Area
  - Total: 1,907 km^{2} (736 sq mi)

Population (2010 Census)
  - Total: 18,392
  - Density: 9.644/km^{2} (24.98/sq mi)
  - Urban: 0%
  - Rural: 100%

Administrative structure
  - Administrative divisions: 16 Selsoviets
  - Inhabited localities: 91 rural localities

Municipal structure
  - Municipally incorporated as: Davlekanovsky Municipal District
  - Municipal divisions: 1 urban settlements, 16 rural settlements
- Time zone: UTC+5 (MSK+2)
- OKTMO ID: 80622000
- Website: http://admdavlekan.ru

Population of Davlekanovsky District
- 2010 Census: 18,392
- 2002 Census: 18,278
- 1989 Census: 39,214
- 1979 Census: 42,042

Davlekanovsky District (Russian: Давлека́новский райо́н; Bashkir: Дәүләкән районы, Däwläkän rayonı) is an administrative and municipal district (raion), one of the fifty-four in the Republic of Bashkortostan, Russia. It is located in the center of the republic and borders with Blagovarsky and Chishminsky Districts in the north, Karmaskalinsky District in the northeast, Aurgazinsky District in the east, Alsheyevsky District in the south, Belebeyevsky District in the west, and with Buzdyaksky District in the northwest. The area of the district is 1,907 square kilometers (736 sq mi). Its administrative center is the town of Davlekanovo (which is not administratively a part of the district). As of the 2010 Census, the total population of the district was 18,392.

== History ==
The district was established on August 20, 1930.

== Administrative and municipal status ==
Within the framework of administrative divisions, Davlekanovsky District is one of the fifty-four in the Republic of Bashkortostan. It is divided into sixteen selsoviets, comprising ninety-one rural localities. The town of Davlekanovo serves as its administrative center, despite being incorporated separately as a town of republic significance—an administrative unit with the status equal to that of the districts.

As a municipal division, the district is incorporated as Davlekanovsky Municipal District, with the town of republic significance of Davlekanovo being incorporated within it as Davlekanovo Urban Settlement. Its sixteen selsoviets are incorporated as sixteen rural settlements within the municipal district. The town of Davlekanovo serves as the administrative center of the municipal district as well.
