= Oleg Kukhta =

Russian singer-songwriter (born 1970)

- Also known as: Олег Кухта; Oleg Kukhta
- Born: Олег Валерьевич Кухта; Oleg Valeryevich Kukhta; 27 December 1970 (age 55); Kinel-Cherkassy, Russian SFSR
- Origin: Russian
- Genres: Classical, pop, opera
- Occupations: Singer-songwriter, musician
- Instruments: Vocal, piano, guitar
- Years active: 1994–present
- Website: olegkukhta.ru

Oleg Valeryevich Kukhta (Russian: Олег Валерьевич Кухта, born 27 December 1970) is a Russian singer-songwriter, actor, former Spetsnaz GRU officer, and military intelligence man. He was titled an Honored Artist of Russia in 2008.

== Early life ==
Oleg Kukhta was born 27 December 1970 in Kinel-Cherkassy, Samara Oblast, Russian SFSR. When he was four years old, his family moved to Pervouralsk in Sverdlovsk Oblast.

== Military career ==
In 1988, he began his studies at the Higher Airborne Command School (Military Institute) in Ryazan. In 1990–1992 he interrupted his studies for service in the army. 1992–1993 he took part in the peacekeeping mission in the Republic of Serbian Krajina. 1994–1996 he continued his studies at the Higher Airborne Command School in Ryazan and at the Military Command Academy in Novosibirsk. He then took part in the First Chechen War (1994 to 1996) as commander of Spetsnaz GRU group. During the war he carried out many military operations, suffered a severe wound and was awarded the Order of Courage and medals. In 1999, he finished his military career and became a senior lieutenant in the Spetsnaz reserve.

== Musical career ==
He began his artistic career as an amateur singer during military service. In 1994, he became the first winner and 1995 Grand Prix winner of the All-Russian Military Song Festival "Victoria". In 1999, he performed in the International Festival "Slavyanskiy Bazar" in Vitebsk, and was awarded with a diploma. After completion of the military career he went from 1999 to 2012 as a soloist of the Academic song and dance ensemble of Internal Forces of Ministry of Internal Affairs. In 2005 he graduated from the Russian Academy of Theatre Arts in Moscow and got the same year the title of Honored Artist of North Ossetia-Alania. In 2008, he was titled an Honored Artist of Russia. Since 2011 he is soloist of the Orchestra of Russian Interior Ministry and began his solo career.

== Discography ==
- 2000: "Армейский сборник 2" (Song Шинели)
- 2003: "Doswidanja. Ich komm wieder" (Song O Happy Day)
- 2003: "Академический ансамбль песни и пляски внутренних войск МВД России" (Song Be My Love)
- 2008: "Академический ансамбль песни и пляски внутренних войск МВД России" (Songs Be My Love, O Happy Day, The Prayer, На дальнем берегу, Piu Che Puo)
- 2010: "Помяни меня, поле. 65 лет Победы в Великой Отечественной войне" (Album)
- 2010: "Русское поле. 65 лет Победы в Великой Отечественной войне" (Album)

== Filmography ==
- 2005: "Not Born Beautiful" / "Не родись красивой"
- 2007: "The Unknown Country" / "Незнакомая земля"
- 2007: "The Teacher in Law" / "Учитель в законе"
- 2011: "The Prosecutor's Investigation" / "Прокурорская проверка»
- 2011: "The Family Dramas" / "Семейные драмы»
- 2011: "Before The Court" /"До суда»

== Awards ==
- Honored Artist of North Ossetia–Alania
- Honored Artist of Russia
- Order of Courage
- Medal "For service in the North Caucasus»
- Medal "Army General Margelov"
- Medal "For Participation in Counterterrorism Operations"
- Medal "200 Years of the Ministry of Internal Affairs"
- United Nations Special Service Medal
- Medal "80 Years of Airborne Forces of Russia»
