= Army General Margelov Medal =

Russian military honor

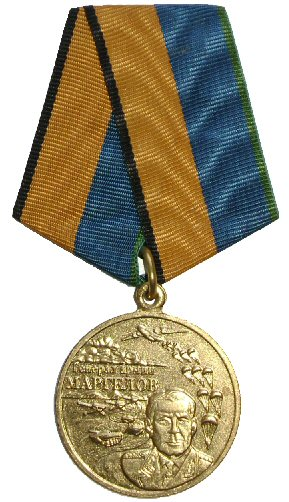
- Army General Margelov Medal (obverse)
- Type: Departmental award
- Presented by: Russian Federation Ministry of Defence
- Eligibility: Military and civilian personnel of the Armed Forces of Russia
- Established: 6 May 2005
- Ribbon of the Army General Margelov Medal

Precedence
- Next (higher): Army General Khrulev Medal
- Next (lower): Major General Alexander Alexandrov Medal

The Army General Margelov Medal (Russian: Медаль Генерал Армии Маргелов) is an award of the Ministry of Defence of the Russian Federation established by Order No. 182 of the Minister of Defence of the Russian Federation of 6 May 2005. It is named after the renowned past commander of Soviet Airborne Troops Army General Vasily Margelov. The medal is awarded to military and civilian personnel of the Russian Airborne Troops for good service.

== Award statute ==
The Army General Margelov Medal is awarded to Russian military personnel serving in the Airborne Troops (VDV) for good service of 15 years or more if previously awarded the Decoration "For Merit" of Airborne Troops. It is also awarded to civilian personnel of the VDV for good service of more than 20 years. The medal can be awarded to veterans of the VDV who are in the reserve or retired, and those who have served for more than 25 years. The medal can also be awarded to military and civilian personnel of the Russian Armed Forces for contributions to the development of the VDV.

The Russian Federation Order of Precedence dictates that the medal is worn immediately after the Army General Khrulev Medal.

== Award description ==
The Army General Margelov Medal is a 32 mm in diameter circular medal made of gilt metal. Its obverse bears a portrait of Vasily Margelov, with tanks and aircraft dropping paratroopers above the general. At the top, there is a relief inscription on two lines "Army General Margelov" (Russian: "Генерал армии МАРГЕЛОВ") . Under the inscription, there is a relief of three howitzers and three BMD infantry fighting vehicles.

The reverse of the medal bears the emblem of the Airborne Troops in the centre, with the embossed inscription "Ministry of Defence" at the top of the medal. The text "Russian Federation" is inscribed at the bottom of the medal.

The medal is suspended from a Russian pentagonal mount by a ring through the metal suspension loop. The mount is covered by an overlapping 24 mm wide silk moiré ribbon with the distinctive left half of Russian Defence Ministry awards consisting of a 2 mm black edge stripe and yellow to the centre, the right half is blue.

== Notable recipients ==
This is a partial list.

- Vladislav Achalov – Commander of the VDV
- Gennady Anashkin – Hero of the Russian Federation, deputy commander of the 58th Army
- Vyacheslav Bocharov – Hero of the Russian Federation, disabled in the Beslan school siege
- Vladimir Chirkin
- Vladimir Churov
- Oleg Gazmanov – Russian singer
- Oleg Kukhta – Spetsnaz GRU officer
- Viktor Sheiman
- Georgy Shpak
- Valery Yevtukhovich – commander of the VDV

== See also ==
- Ministerial awards of the Russian Federation
- Awards and emblems of the Ministry of Defence of the Russian Federation
- Awards of the Ministry for Emergency Situations of Russia
- Awards of the Ministry of Internal Affairs of Russia
- Awards of the Federal Border Service of the Russian Federation
- Awards of the Federal Protective Service of the Russian Federation
- Awards of the Federal Security Service of the Russian Federation
- Honorary titles of Russia
