= Awards and emblems of the Ministry of Defence of the Russian Federation =

Military awards in Russia

The Ministry of Defence of the Russian Federation has its own complex system of awards. This not only includes awards common to all the Armed Forces but also service specific and departmental awards subordinate to state awards. All awards herein were approved by orders of the Minister of Defence, these order numbers and inception dates are included as quick references to facilitate any further research.

== Ministry of Defence ==
=== Medals ===
The medals below are displayed in their proper order of precedence from top to bottom in accordance with the latest ministerial order of the defence ministry of the RF.

Award	Name (English/Russian)	Ministerial Order	Inception Date	Award Criteria
	Medal "For Distinction in Combat" Медаль «За Боевые Отличия»	No. 100 - No. 342 - No. 777	2003-03-31 ---------- 2008-06-20 ---------- 2017-12-14	Awarded to military personnel of the Armed Forces of the Russian Federation who stand out for courage and dedication in carrying out combat assignments or special operations in life-threatening situations. For carrying out proactive and decisive action that contributed to the success of the mission, for successfully guiding the actions of subordinates in carrying out combat missions. The type 1 of the medal awarded from its creation to 2017 is at left. The type 2 award at right with new background and ribbon has been awarded since December 2017.
	Medal "For Military Valour"; 1st Class Медаль «За Воинскую Доблесть» I Степени	No. 608 - No. 342 - No. 777	1999-12-22 ---------- 2008-06-20 ---------- 2017-12-14	Awarded to military personnel of the Armed Forces of the Russian Federation for excellent performance in training, for special distinction while performing normal military or combat duties, military exercises and military manoeuvres; for courage, dedication and other merits as demonstrated in the performance of military duty. The 1st and 2nd classes are bestowed sequentially, 2nd class, then 1st class.
	Medal "For Military Valour"; 2nd Class Медаль «За Воинскую Доблесть» II Степени	No. 608 - No. 342 - No. 777	1999-12-22 ---------- 2008-06-20 ---------- 2017-12-14	Awarded to military personnel of the Armed Forces of the Russian Federation for excellent performance in training, for special distinction while performing normal military or combat duties, military exercises and manoeuvres; for courage, dedication and other merits as demonstrated in the performance of military duty. The 1st and 2nd classes are bestowed sequentially, 2nd class, then 1st class.
	Medal "For Mine Clearing" Медаль «За Разминирование»	No. 90 - No. 342 - No. 777	2002-02-26 ---------- 2008-06-20 ---------- 2017-12-14	Awarded to members of the Armed Forces of the Russian Federation for their dedication, bravery courage and professionalism in the tasks of detecting and clearing (eliminating) explosive objects on the ground; for participation in international programs, projects or operations involved in Humanitarian Demining; in organising and directing mine clearance operations. Inscription on reverse reads «ЗА РАЗМИНИРОВАНИЕ» (For Clearance) «МИНИСТЕРСТВО ОБОРОНЫ» (Ministry of Defence) «РОССИЙСКОЙ ФЕДЕРАЦИИ» (Russian Federation).
	Medal "For Strengthening Military Cooperation" Медаль «За Укрепление Боевого Содружества»	No. 123 - No. 85 - No. 777	1995-03-27 ---------- 2009-03-05 ---------- 2017-12-14	Awarded to military and civilian personnel of the Ministry of Defence of the Russian Federation, and in some cases to ordinary citizens of Russia or foreign citizens for merits in strengthening the brotherhood of arms and fostering military cooperation with friendly nations. Type 1 medal (left) was awarded between 1995 and 2009. The type 2 medal (center) with new ribbon and reverse was awarded between 2009 and 2017, the type 3 medal (right) with new ribbon has been awarded since 2017.
	Medal "For Distinguished Military Service" 1st Class Медаль «За Отличие В Военной Службе» I Степени	No. 123 - No. 85 - No. 777	1995-03-27 ---------- 2009-03-05 ---------- 2017-12-14	Awarded to military personnel of the Defence Ministry of the Russian Federation for 20 years of good service. Type 1 medal (left) was awarded between 1995 and 2009. The type 2 award with new ribbon and reverse has been awarded since 2009.
	Medal "For Distinguished Military Service" 2nd Class Медаль «За Отличие В Военной Службе» II Степени	No. 123 - No. 85 - No. 777	1995-03-27 ---------- 2009-03-05 ---------- 2017-12-14	Awarded to military personnel of the Defence Ministry of the Russian Federation for 15 years of good service. Type 1 medal (left) was awarded between 1995 and 2009. The type 2 award with new ribbon and reverse has been awarded since 2009.
	Medal "For Distinguished Military Service" 3rd Class Медаль «За Отличие В Военной Службе» III Степени	No. 123 - No. 85 - No. 777	1995-03-27 ---------- 2009-03-05 ---------- 2017-12-14	Awarded to military personnel of the Defence Ministry of the Russian Federation for 10 years of good service. Type 1 medal (left) was awarded between 1995 and 2009. The type 2 award with new ribbon and reverse has been awarded since 2009.
	Medal "For Labour Valour" Медаль «За Трудовую Доблесть»	No. 310 - No. 342 - No. 220 - No. 692 - No. 777	2000-06-05 ---------- 2008-06-20 ---------- 2014-04-05 ---------- 2016-10-27 ---------- 2017-12-14	Awarded to civilian personnel of the Armed Forces of the Russian Federation with at least 15 years of civil service in the Ministry of Defense of the Russian Federation (Armed Forces of the Russian Federation) for conscientious performance of labor duties.
	Medal "Mikhail Kalashnikov" Медаль «Михаил Калашников»	No. 221 - No. 777	2014-04-05 ---------- 2017-12-14	Awarded to military and civilian personnel of the Armed Forces of the Russian Federation, as well as to employees of the military-industrial complex of the Russian Federation, to industrial production and scientific research organizations for excellence in innovation in the design, manufacture and commissioning of modern weapons and military equipment.
	Medal "Participant in Military Operations in Syria" Медаль «Участнику военной операции в Сирии»	No. 732 - No. 777	2015-11-30 ---------- 2017-12-14	Awarded to military and civilian personnel of the Armed Forces of the Russian Federation: for excellence, courage and selflessness, displayed during military operations in the Arab Republic of Syria; for the successful management of the actions of subordinates in carrying out military operations in the Arab Republic of Syria; for selfless work and great personal contribution in the performance of tasks during military operations in the Arab Republic of Syria. May also be awarded to other citizens of the Russian Federation and to foreign citizens for assistance in solving the tasks assigned to the Armed Forces of the Russian Federation during military operations in the Arab Republic of Syria.
	Medal "Participant of the March-Shot Bosnia-Kosovo 12 June 1999" Медаль «Участнику Марш-Броска Босния-Косово 12 Июня 1999»	No. 75 - No. 342 - No. 645	2000-02-11 ---------- 2008-06-20 ---------- 2017-10-24	Awarded to military and civilian personnel of the Armed Forces of the Russian Federation for their courage, bravery and valour displayed during the preparation and conduct of operation March-Shot of 12 June 1999 in Bosnia-Kosovo. The silver medal is awarded to actual participants of the raid, the bronze (tombac) medal is awarded for assistance in preparation and direct support of the operation. 93 awarded in Silver, 250 awarded in Bronze. Replaced in October 2017 by the medal "Participant in Peacekeeping Operations". No longer awarded.
	Medal "For Diligence in Engineering Tasks" Медаль «За Усердие При Выполнении Задач Инженерного Обеспечения»	No. 315 - No. 342	2000-06-18 ---------- 2008-06-20	Awarded to members of the Armed Forces for special distinction and exemplary execution of engineering tasks and activities; for merit demonstrated in the design and engineering of weapons and their successful exploitation, for initiative, diligence and hard work in performance aimed at enhancing the combat readiness of engineering troops.
	Medal "200 Years of the Ministry of Defence" Медаль «200 Лет Министерству Обороны»	No. 300 - No. 342	2002-08-30 ---------- 2008-06-20	Awarded to members of the Armed Forces of the Russian Federation having faithfully served for 25 years or more; other military troops, military units and bodies that Russian law provides for in military service.
	Medal "For Merit in Upholding the Memory of Fallen Defenders of the Homeland" Медаль «За Заслуги В Увековечении Памяти Погибших Защитников Отечества»	No. 505 - No. 342	2007-12-04 ---------- 2008-06-20	Awarded to soldiers and civilian personnel of the Armed Forces for great personal contribution to perpetuating the memory of the fallen Defenders of the Fatherland, their names and the fate of missing servicemen, demonstrating high moral and business qualities, diligence and initiative as well as to other citizens of the Russian Federation or foreign nationals who assist in perpetuating the memory of the fallen Defenders of the Fatherland.
	Medal "For Service in Railway Troops" Медаль «За Службу В Железнодорожных Войсках»	No. 330 - No. 342	2007-08-14 ---------- 2008-06-20	Awarded to soldiers of Railway Troops for good service of 10 years or more, subject to having previously been awarded the decoration "For Merit" of Railway Troops, as well as to members of the civilian staff who served (worked) for 20 years or more. The medal may also be awarded to individuals who have made a significant contribution to the development of Railway Troops and assisted in the tasks entrusted to the service.
	Medal "For Excellence in the Completion of Higher Professional Education in a Military Educational Institution of the MoD of the RF" Медаль «За Отличное Окончание Военного Образовательного Учреждения Высшего Профессионального Образования МО РФ»	No. 336 - No. 342	2007-08-20 ---------- 2008-06-20	Awarded to soldiers who have completed training in military institutions of higher vocational education, passed all the prescribed curriculum tests (tests with the assessment) and final certification testing with a final rating of "excellent".
	Medal "For Participation in the Victory Day Military Parade" Медаль «За Участие В Военном Параде В День Победы»	No. 130	2010-02-26	Awarded to military and civilian personnel of the Armed Forces of the Russian Federation and to foreign troops, military formations and bodies, for active participation, for the training and preparation of personnel, of weapons and of military equipment, for assistance in the preparation and conduct of the military parade on Victory Day in Moscow, in other Hero cities, as well as in cities where military districts headquarters, fleets headquarters, combined forces headquarters as well as the Caspian Flotilla headquarters are located; for distinction displayed during the military parade in Moscow, in other Hero Cities, as well as in cities where military districts headquarters, fleets headquarters, combined forces headquarters as well as the Caspian Flotilla headquarters are located.
	Medal "For the Return of Crimea" Медаль «За возвращение Крыма»	No. 160	2014-03-21	Awarded to military and civilian personnel of the Armed Forces of the Russian Federation for services and distinction displayed during the security measures related to the protection of the rights and lives of the citizens of the Crimea, the March 16, 2014 referendum in the Crimea and the entry of the Crimea in the Russian Federation as the result of the referendum. The medal can also be awarded to other citizens of the Russian Federation and to foreign citizens for assistance in solving the tasks assigned to the Armed Forces of the Russian Federation relating to these security measures taken in the Crimea.
	Medal "Admiral of the Fleet of the Soviet Union N.G. Kuznetsov" Медаль «Адмирал Флота Советского Союза Н.Г. Кузнецов»	No. 25 - No. 279 - No. 342 - No. 1023 - No. 34	2003-01-27 ---------- 2004-09-18 ---------- 2008-06-20 ---------- 2009-09-23 ---------- 2013-01-21	Awarded to naval personnel of the Navy of the Russian Federation for excellence in training; for impeccable service on ships, submarines or in a naval air crew for at least 5 years, in other naval formations for at least 10 years; for the successful implementation of tasks from at least 3 armed services; for great personal contribution to the high alert status of ships, submarines, aircraft or shore naval installations; for skilled, competent leadership of subordinate personnel and proactive, decisive actions that contribute to the success of naval combat operations; to other persons for merit in strengthening the combat readiness of the Navy.
	Medal "Admiral of the Fleet of the Soviet Union S.G. Gorshkov" Медаль «Адмирал Флота Советского Союза С.Г. Горшков»	No. 25 - No. 342 - No. 1023 - No. 35	2003-01-27 ---------- 2008-06-20 ---------- 2009-09-23 ---------- 2013-01-21	Awarded to members of the Russian Navy for great personal contribution to the development, production, testing and putting into operation of ships, submarines, aircraft and other military equipment intended for the Navy in a timely manner and with high quality; running tests on ships, submarines, development of new aircraft; for the introduction of new constructive solutions to significantly improve the combat capabilities of weapons and military equipment; the successful development of weapons and military equipment.
	Medal "Army General Khrulev" Медаль «Генерал Армии Хрулёв»	No. 210 - No. 342	2004-07-10 ---------- 2008-06-20	Awarded to senior logistics officers of the Armed Forces of the Russian Federation, to officials responsible for (ship) management, and that served for or have served in the armed forces for 20 years or more, as well as veterans of military service for great personal contribution to the organisation of logistical troops.
	Medal "Army General Margelov" Медаль «Генерал Армии Маргелов»	No. 182 - No. 342	2005-05-05 ---------- 2008-06-20	Awarded to soldiers serving in airborne units for good service of 15 years or more subject to previously being awarded an insignia «For merit», as well as members of the civilian staff for Airborne troops that have served faithfully in Airborne Troops for more than 20 years. May also be awarded to veterans of Airborne troops, in the Airborne reserve or retired and having served 25 years or more, as well as military and civilian personnel of the Armed Forces of the Russian Federation for personal contribution to the strengthening and development of airborne troops.
	Medal "Major General Alexander Alexandrov" Медаль «Генерал-Майор Александр Александров»	No. 317 - No. 342	2005-08-02 ---------- 2008-06-20	Awarded to members of the armed forces, civilian personnel of the Armed Forces, veterans of the Armed Forces who are in reserve or retired, as well as other citizens of the Russian Federation for great personal contribution to the creation and promotion of Russian patriotic military music and the development of military music culture.
	Medal "300 Years of the Baltic Fleet" Медаль «300 Лет Балтийскому флоту»	No. 160 - No. 342 - No. 1023	2003-05-16 ---------- 2008-06-20 ---------- 2009-09-23	Awarded to sailors of the Baltic Fleet who faithfully performed their official duties for 10 years or more as of 18 May 2003; to civilian personnel of the Baltic Fleet who faithfully performed their official duties for 25 years or more as of 18 May 2003; to other persons providing assistance in carrying out the assigned tasks of the Baltic Fleet.
	Medal "For Service in the Air Force" Медаль «За Службу В Военно-Воздушных Силах»	No. 240 - No. 342 - No. 470	2004-08-13 ---------- 2008-06-20 ---------- 2015-08-01	Was awarded to soldiers of the Air Force of the Russian Federation for 20 years or more of good service subject to holding the Medal For Distinguished Military Service 1st Class or a decoration "For Merit". In exceptional cases, for rewarding veterans of the Air Force or Air Defence Troops that met specified conditions like having been previously awarded the decoration "For merit" of the Air Force or of Air Defence Forces. It was replaced by the Medal "For Service in Aerospace Forces" in August 2015, it is no longer awarded.
	Medal "For Service in Naval Infantry" Медаль «За Службу В Морской Пехоте»	No. 455 - No. 342 - No. 1023	2005-11-03 ---------- 2008-06-20 ---------- 2009-09-23	Awarded to soldiers performing military service in the administration of Navy coastal troops, military compounds or Naval Infantry, for impeccable service of 5 years or more. The medal (regardless of the duration of military service in the Naval Infantry) may be awarded to soldiers for bravery and courage shown in the performance of military duty. Naval Infantry veterans may be awarded the medal for special services.
	Medal "For Service in the Submarine Force" Медаль «За Службу В Подводных Силах»	No. 105 - No. 342 - No. 1023	2006-03-10 ---------- 2008-06-20 ---------- 2009-09-23	Awarded to naval personnel for impeccable service associated with Navy submarines for 5 years or more, for bravery and courage shown in the performance of military duty or special combat missions; to civilian personnel of the armed forces of the Russian Federation, as well as other citizens of the Russian Federation who assist in fulfilling the tasks assigned to the Navy.
	Medal "Army General Komarovskii" Медаль «Генерал Армии Комаровский»	No. 175 - No. 342	2006-05-02 ---------- 2008-06-20	Awarded to soldiers for impeccable service over 10 years or more in the service of quartering and settlement of the Ministry of Defence of the Russian Federation, for courage and bravery shown in the performance of military duty or special tasks; to civilian personnel of the armed forces who have served in the Service of quartering and settlement of troops for 15 years or more, to veterans of military service for great personal contribution to the development of military construction, organization and arrangement of the quartering of troops, and other persons, in assisting in addressing the tasks assigned to the quartering and settlement service.
	Medal "Colonel General Dutov" Медаль «Генерал-полковник Дутов»	No. 450 - No. 342	2006-11-07 ---------- 2008-06-20	Awarded for outstanding personal contribution to the development and improvement of the financial and economic capabilities of the Armed Forces of the Russian Federation, for improving the social protection of the Armed Forces while demonstrating the highest professional and business qualities; to military and civilian personnel of financial and economic bodies of the Armed Forces who have served in these bodies for 10 years or more; to citizens of the Russian Federation, dismissed from military service after 20 years or more and who served in the financial and economic bodies of the Armed Forces for 10 years or more; to other citizens who provide assistance in addressing the financial and economic challenges facing the Armed Forces.
	Medal "For Merit in Ensuring a Nuclear Capability" Медаль «За Заслуги В Ядерном Обеспечении»	No. 290 - No. 342	2007-07-27 ---------- 2008-06-20	Awarded to members of the Armed Forces, civilian personnel of the Armed Forces, veterans of the Armed Forces who are in reserve or retired, as well as other citizens of the Russian Federation for great personal contribution to the establishment and development of nuclear weapons for the Russian Federation, for special merit in addressing the challenges facing the Ministry of Defence.
	Medal "For Service in Space Forces" Медаль «За Службу В Космических Войсках»	No. 360 - No. 342 - No. 470	2007-11-11 ---------- 2008-06-20 ---------- 2015-08-01	Was awarded for initiative, diligence and distinction shown in the line of duty in military service for 20 years or more if already awarded the decoration "For Merit" of Space Troops. It was replaced by the Medal "For Service in Aerospace Forces" in August 2015, it is no longer awarded.
	Medal "100 Years of the Air Force" Медаль «100 лет Военно-воздушным силам»	No. 1855 - No. 470	2012-07-31 ---------- 2015-08-01	Awarded to members of aircrews, ground crews and to servicemen of Air Defense Forces for conscientious service; to veterans of the Air Force and Air Defense Forces, retired from military service, in recognition of their distinguished service. No longer awarded.
	Medal "Marshal of Artillery E.V. Boychuk" Медаль «Маршал артиллерии Е.В. Бойчук»	No. 2777	2012-09-04	Awarded to serving artillerymen and to veterans of Artillery troops, for courage and selflessness in the performance of combat missions with a risk to life; for resolute and operational actions that led to the successful performance of combat missions; for the skilful management of the actions of subordinates.
	Medal "Strategic Command-Staff Exercise - Caucasus 2012" Медаль «Стратегическое командно-штабное учение - Кавказ 2012»	No. 2828	2012-09-14	Awarded to military personnel of the Armed Forces of the Russian Federation for high personal performance in field, naval or air training achieved during the Strategic Command-Staff Exercise "Caucasus 2012"; for having skilfully organized and conducted Strategic Command-Staff Exercise "Caucasus 2012"; for achievements in the development and improvement of techniques and methods of warfare enhancing the effectiveness of weapons and military equipment used during the Strategic Command-Staff Exercise "Caucasus 2012".
	Medal "200 Years of Road Construction Troops" Медаль «200 лет дорожным войскам»	No. 2929	2012-09-21	Awarded to military personnel of Road Construction Troops, as well as to veterans of Road Construction Troops, retired from military service or to the reserve, for impeccable and long service, who made a great contribution in the tasks entrusted to Road Construction Troops.
	Medal "For Service in Naval Aviation" Медаль «За службу в морской авиации»	No. 523	2013-07-19	Awarded to military aviation personnel of the Navy of the Russian Federation for conscientious service of 5 years or more. In some cases, may be awarded to veterans of Russian naval aviation, retired from military service, who have previously served in naval aviation or who have been dismissed from it.
	Medal "For Distinguished Service in the Land Forces" Медаль «За отличие в службе в Сухопутных войсках»	No. 550	2013-07-31	Awarded to military personnel performing military service in headquarters units, higher formations and units of the Land Forces, veterans of military service in the Land Forces, and to members of the civilian staff of Land Forces, with conscientious service of 5 years or more; for courage and bravery displayed during the performance of military duties; or for the execution of special tasks regardless of the period of military service in Land Forces; as well as to other citizens of the Russian Federation for assisting the Land Forces in the execution of their assigned tasks.
	Medal "Participant in the Struggle Against the Elements of the Amur" Медаль «Участнику борьбы со стихией на Амуре»	No. 665	2013-09-17	Awarded to military and civilian personnel of the Armed Forces of the Russian Federation, of other military forces, military formations and bodies, as well as to other citizens of the Russian Federation and foreign citizens: for their dedicated, determined and skillful actions in the performance of tasks of flood control in the Khabarovsk Territory, the Amur region and the Jewish Autonomous Region in 2013; for the successful management of the actions of subordinates in carrying out the tasks of flood control in the Khabarovsk Territory, the Amur region and the Jewish Autonomous Region in 2013.
	Medal "For Diligence in Ensuring Road Safety" Медаль «За усердие в обеспечении безопасности дорожного движения»	No. 740	2013-10-19	Awarded to military and civilian personnel of the Armed Forces of the Russian Federation, and in some cases, to other citizens of the Russian Federation, for great contribution to road safety in the Armed Forces; for trouble-free operation of vehicles belonging to military units (organizations) of the Armed Forces; for the introduction of new design solutions which will significantly improve road safety in the Armed Forces; for contributions to road safety at events involving men and vehicles of the Armed Forces; for impeccable service in the military automotive inspection service of at least 10 years, and in other military units (organizations) of the Armed Forces in positions directly associated with road safety for not less than 20 years; for achievements of high performance in activities aimed at preventive measures to prevent road traffic injuries, the suppression of offenses in the field of road safety; for reliable management of subordinate personnel contributing to the reduction of accidents in subordinate military units (organizations) at the end of the fiscal year; for assistance in addressing the tasks assigned to the military Automobile Inspectorate of the Armed Forces.
	Jubilee Medal "25 Years of the End of Hostilities in Afghanistan" Юбилейная медаль «В память 25-летия окончания боевых действий в Афганистане»	No. 900	2013-12-17	Awarded to veterans of the fighting in the Democratic Republic of Afghanistan for the period of 1979–1989; to members of the Armed Forces of the USSR, persons attached to them, as well as to citizens of the states - members of the Commonwealth of Independent States who have made a great contribution to the establishment of the names and burial sites of the dead and the fate of missing persons, who actively participated in the social and medical rehabilitation of soldiers-internationalists and their families, who perpetuated the memory of the fallen. May also be awarded to citizens of countries from outside the Commonwealth of Independent States in exceptional circumstances.
	Medal "For Service in Electronic Warfare Troops" Медаль «За службу в войсках радиоэлектронной борьбы»	No. 948	2013-12-23	Awarded to military personnel of all ranks of the Electronic Warfare Troops of the Russian Federation with at least 5 years of service, for valour, ingenuity and courage displayed during service, for excellent performance of duties. May also be awarded to citizens of the Russian Federation, whose actions helped in the development and establishment of the Electronic Warfare Troops of the Russian Federation.
	Medal "For Naval Merit in the Arctic" Медаль «За морские заслуги в Арктике»	No. 167	2014-03-22	Awarded to military personnel of the Navy of the Russian Federation who took part in exercises, expeditions and other events held in the North Pole and who displayed courage, ingenuity and conducted themselves in difficult situations. In exceptional cases, the medal may be awarded to civilians who have made a great contribution to the organization and realization of such activities.
	Medal "For Service in Naval Surface Forces" Медаль «За службу в надводных силах»	No. 195	2014-04-02	Awarded to military personnel of the Navy of the Russian Federation, whether conscripts or under contract, with at least 5 years of service on surface ships, for courage and bravery in the performance of their duties. May also be awarded to civilian personnel who have made a great contribution to the tasks assigned to the Navy of the Russian Federation.
	Medal "For Distinction during an Exercise" Медаль «За отличие в учениях»	No. 219	2014-04-05	Awarded to military personnel of the Armed Forces of the Russian Federation for high personal performance in field, naval or air training achieved during a major exercise; for having skilfully organized and conducted exercises in which all set goals were achieved; for achievements in the development and improvement of techniques and methods of warfare enhancing the effectiveness of weapons and military equipment used during the exercise.
	Medal "Artist Grekov" Медаль «Художник Греков»	No. 370	2014-05-30	Originally established in 1966 by the Ministry of Culture of the USSR and awarded until 1991. Reinstated in 2014 and awarded to military and civilian personnel of the Armed Forces of the Russian Federation, servicemen of other forces, military formations and bodies in which the legislation of the Russian Federation provides for military service, as well as to other citizens of the Russian Federation for personal merit in creating highly artistic works of art of a military-patriotic theme, for the organization of the activities of military artists and the training of military artists.
	Medal "Signal Corps Marshal Peresypkin" Медаль «Маршал войск связи Пересыпкин»	No. 373	2014-05-30	Awarded to military personnel of Communication Troops, both now serving and to veterans, as well as to representatives of other military departments, for special merit in the service of the Russian Federation. May also be awarded to citizens of other states for effective cooperation with communication departments or units of the Armed Forces of the Russian Federation.
	Medal "For achievements in the development of innovative technologies" Медаль «За достижения в области развития инновационных технологий»	No. 531	2014-08-01	Awarded to military and civilian personnel of the Armed Forces of the Russian Federation for significant personal contribution to the implementation of technological innovations; for a technological breakthrough and support in high-risk research and development in the field of defence. May also be awarded to other citizens of the Russian Federation for direct assistance in the task of development and implementation of innovative technologies for the Armed Forces of the Russian Federation.
	Medal "World Championship Tank Biathlon"; 1st place Медаль «Чемпионат мира танковый биатлон» I место	No. 299	2014-05-07	Awarded to military personnel of the Armed Forces of the Russian Federation and to military personnel of foreign armed forces who ranked 1st in the annual WORLD CHAMPIONSHIP TANK BIATHLON. This is the approved reduction medal for wear on the uniform as detailed in the official event regulations. The medal presented for the competition is of the same design but 60mm in diameter and hangs from a white 32mm wide neck ribbon.
	Medal "World Championship Tank Biathlon"; 2nd place Медаль «Чемпионат мира танковый биатлон» II место	No. 299	2014-05-07	Awarded to military personnel of the Armed Forces of the Russian Federation and to military personnel of foreign armed forces who ranked 2nd in the annual WORLD CHAMPIONSHIP TANK BIATHLON. This is the approved reduction medal for wear on the uniform as detailed in the official event regulations. The medal presented for the competition is of the same design but 60mm in diameter and hangs from a white 32mm wide neck ribbon.
	Medal "World Championship Tank Biathlon"; 3rd place Медаль «Чемпионат мира танковый биатлон» III место	No. 299	2014-05-07	Awarded to military personnel of the Armed Forces of the Russian Federation and to military personnel of foreign armed forces who ranked 3rd in the annual WORLD CHAMPIONSHIP TANK BIATHLON. This is the approved reduction medal for wear on the uniform as detailed in the official event regulations. The medal presented for the competition is of the same design but 60mm in diameter and hangs from a white 32mm wide neck ribbon.
	Medal "Chief Marshal of Aviation Kutakhov" Медаль «Главный маршал авиации Кутахов»	No. 560 - No. 470	2014-08-07 ---------- 2015-08-01	Was awarded to soldiers and officers serving in organizations under military control, attending military training of higher education in specialties of the Air Force; to military personnel serving in the reserve or retired from military service in the Air Force, for great personal contribution to the development of the Air Force; to leaders of federal and regional ministerial authorities, to enterprises of the military-industrial complex and public organizations of the Russian Federation, to citizens and allies of the Russian Federation, for assisting in the tasks assigned to the Air Force. It was replaced by the Medal "For Service in Aerospace Forces" in August 2015, it is no longer awarded.
	Medal "All-Army competition" 1st place Медаль «За отличие в соревнованиях» I место	No. 675	2014-09-18	Awarded to military personnel of the Armed Forces of the Russian Federation who ranked 1st in the all-army inter-departmental field competitions finals, in military sports championships, cups, command and district level competitions, and to their head coaches.
	Medal "All-Army competition" 2nd place Медаль «За отличие в соревнованиях» II место	No. 675	2014-09-18	Awarded to military personnel of the Armed Forces of the Russian Federation who ranked 2nd in the all-army inter-departmental field competitions finals, in military sports championships, cups, command and district level competitions, and to their head coaches.
	Medal "All-Army competition" 3rd place Медаль «За отличие в соревнованиях» III место	No. 675	2014-09-18	Awarded to military personnel of the Armed Forces of the Russian Federation who ranked 3rd in the all-army inter-departmental field competitions finals, in military sports championships, cups, command and district level competitions, and to their head coaches.
	Medal "For Merit in Maintaining Law and Order" Медаль «За заслуги в обеспечении законности и правопорядка»	No. 722	2014-10-04	Awarded to military and civilian personnel of the Armed Forces of the Russian Federation for personal contribution to law and order in the Armed Forces; for the introduction of new methods and ways of working that significantly improve the state of law and order in the Armed Forces; for services to law and order during events involving military personnel of the Armed Forces; for impeccable service in the Military Police of the Armed Forces for at least 10 years; for the pursuit of excellence in performance, aimed at preventive measures for the prevention of crimes and incidents in the Armed Forces; for skilful and competent management of subordinate personnel, in helping to reduce crime and accidents in subordinate units, military units (organizations). May also be awarded to other citizens of the Russian Federation providing assistance in solving the tasks assigned to the Military Police of the Armed Forces.
	Medal "For Merit in Technical-Material Security" Медаль «За заслуги в материально-техническом обеспечении»	No. 905	2014-12-12	Ministerial Order identified but not yet found and is possibly unpublished to this date.
	Medal "For Service in the National Control Centre for the Defence of the Russian Federation" Медаль «За службу в Национальном центре управления обороной Российской Федерации»	No. 912	2014-12-12	Awarded to servicemen who are (or used to be) in military service under contract with the National Control Centre for the Defence of the Russian Federation, for initiative and diligence displayed during military service over three years or more; for distinction in the performance of military duties and special missions. May also be awarded to other members of the Armed Forces of the Russian Federation, to personnel of the civilian staff of the Armed Forces of the Russian Federation, and to other Russian citizens, for a significant contribution to resolving the tasks assigned to the National Control Centre for the Defence of the Russian Federation.
	Medal "For participation in the military parade to mark the 70th anniversary of Victory in the Great Patriotic War of 1941–1945" Медаль «За участие в военном параде в ознаменование 70-летия Победы в Великой Отечественной войне 1941–1945 гг»	No. 955	2014-12-31	Awarded to military and civilian personnel of the Armed Forces of the Russian Federation and to foreign troops, military formations and bodies, for active participation in the preparation of personnel, of weapons and of military equipment for the military parade on the 2014 Victory Day in Moscow, for distinction displayed during the military parade.
	Medal "In Memory of the Heroes of the Homeland" Медаль «Памяти героев Отечества»	No. 35	2015-01-26	Awarded to military personnel for outstanding achievements in the field of military history and the humanities as well as for the implementation of major public projects of historical and patriotic character. May also be awarded to civilians, including foreigners, assisting in the tasks assigned to the Armed Forces of Russia.
	Medal "For Service in Aerospace Forces" Медаль «За службу в воздушно-космических силах»	No. 470	2015-08-01	Awarded to military and civilian personnel of the Armed Forces of the Russian Federation serving in the Air Force, or discharged from military service in the Air Force, for conscientious service (work) of 20 years or more in calendar years on condition of having previously been awarded a decoration of the Air Force or of Space Forces "For merit", "For distinction" or a commendation.
	Medal "100 Years of the Navigation Service of the Air Force" Медаль «100 лет штурманской службе Военно-воздушных сил»	No. 146	2016-03-24	Awarded to military and civilian personnel of the Armed Forces of the Russian Federation, who have served (worked) in Aerospace Forces of the Russian Federation for at least 15 years, for personal contribution to the development of the Navigation Service and for the highest performance rates, as well as to other soldiers, in the reserves or retired, for previous military service in Air Defense Forces or in the Air Force that have served for 25 years or more, for great personal contribution to the development of the Navigation Service. The medal may also be awarded to workers of the military industrial complex of the Russian Federation, and to other citizens of the Russian Federation for assistance in addressing the tasks assigned to the Aerospace Forces.
	Medal "For the Liberation of Palmyra" Медаль «За освобождение Пальмиры»	No. 273	2016-05-14	Awarded to servicemen of the Armed Forces of the Russian Federation and of the Syrian Arab Army, for direct participation in the heroic storming and liberation of Palmyra during the period from the 13th to 27 March 2016, as well as to the planners and leaders of military operations during the liberation of the Syrian city. The medal may also be awarded to civilians, for their assistance in dealing with the tasks entrusted to the united military forces in conducting military operations for the liberation of Palmyra.
	Medal "For the Demining of Palmyra" Медаль «За разминирование Пальмиры»	No. 277	2016-05-14	Awarded to soldiers of the International EOD Center of the Armed Forces of the Russian Federation, and in some cases, to other citizens, for dedication, courage and professionalism in conducting demining operations in the Syrian city of Palmyra in April and May 2016, for the performance of tasks in the detection and neutralization of explosive devices in the area, as well as for the organization and manual demining.
	Medal "Veteran of the Armed Forces of the Russian Federation" Медаль «Ветеран Вооруженных сил Российской Федерации»	No. 770	2016-11-24	Awarded for many years of honest service in the Armed Forces of the Russian Federation if previously awarded state awards of the Russian Federation (or of the USSR), or awarded the Russian Federation Presidential Certificate of Honour or of Gratitude, or if awarded two or more Defence Ministry of the Russian Federation departmental decorations, and having served with no disciplinary problems for 25 years or more in calendar years at the time of retirement from the military.
	Medal "Marshal of the Soviet Union A.M. Vasilevsky" Медаль «Маршал Советского Союза А.М.Василевский»	No. 780	2016-11-30	Awarded to officers of the General Staff of the Armed Forces of the Russian Federation and officers of operational directorates, divisions (departments) of the branches of the Armed Forces of the Russian Federation, of military districts, of the Northern Fleet, of arms of the Armed Forces of the Russian Federation, for exemplary performance of military duties and high performance indicators, with service of 10 years or more. The medal may also be awarded to citizens who are in the reserve or retired, for previous military service in the General Staff of the Russian Armed Forces who have served in the military for 25 years or more, as well as to other citizens of the Russian Federation, for assistance in solving the tasks assigned to the General Staff of the Russian Armed Forces.
	Medal "Army General Shtemenko" Медаль «Генерал армии Штеменко»	No. 222	2017-04-10	Awarded to officers of the General Staff of the Armed Forces of the Russian Federation, to military and civilian personnel of the organs of organisational mobilisation of the Armed Forces of the Russian Federation or of structural units for the protection of State secrets of the Armed Forces of the Russian Federation, who served (worked) in organs of organisational mobilisation of the Armed Forces of the Russian Federation, in military commissariats, in structural units for the protection of State secrets of the Armed Forces of the Russian Federation, for a minimum of five calendar years: for great personal contribution to mobilisation readiness of the Armed Forces of the Russian Federation, for the organisation and participation in activities aimed at the mobilisation readiness of the Armed Forces of the Russian Federation, for the implementation of activities aimed at the protection of State secrets of the Armed Forces of the Russian Federation. The medal may be awarded to citizens of the Russian Federation who have served (worked) in organs of organisational mobilisation of the Armed Forces of the Russian Federation or of structural units for the protection of State secrets of the Armed Forces of the Russian Federation, with a total service (work) time of more than 25 calendar years, it may also be awarded to sympathetic citizens of the Russian Federation for assistance in solving the tasks assigned to the organs of organisational mobilisation of the Armed Forces of the Russian Federation or of structural units for the protection of State secrets of the Armed Forces of the Russian Federation.
	Medal "100 Years of the Moscow Higher Combined Arms Command School" Медаль «100 лет Московскому ВОКУ»	No. 250	2017-04-24	Awarded to military and civilian personnel of the Moscow Higher Combined Arms Command School for distinction in the organisation of daily activities and the development of the educational process; to citizens of the Russian Federation who previously served (worked) in the school and made a significant contribution to the training of highly qualified military cadre personnel; to sympathetic citizens of the Russian Federation for assistance in solving the tasks assigned to the school.
	Medal "Participant in the Main Naval Parade" Медаль «За участие В Главном военно-морском параде»	No. 360	2017-05-31	Awarded to military and civilian personnel of the Armed Forces of the Russian Federation for distinction displayed during the preparation and conduct of the main naval parade; to other citizens of the Russian Federation for assistance in the preparation and conduct of the main naval parade.
	Medal "5 Years of Military Service" Медаль «5 лет на военной службе»	No. 535	2017-09-07	Awarded to soldiers (sailors), sergeants and sergeant-majors of the Armed Forces of the Russian Federation, in military service under contract for at least five years in calendar terms: for reasonable initiative, diligence and distinction in service; for the excellent development of new models of weapons and military equipment; for the successful execution of special assignments.
	Medal "Participant in Peacekeeping Operations" Медаль «Участнику миротворческой операций»	No. 645	2017-10-24	Awarded to military and civilian personnel of the Armed Force of the Russian Federation for special distinction displayed in the preparation, security and conduct of peacekeeping operations; to other citizens of the Russian Federation and to foreign nationals, who render assistance in resolving the tasks entrusted to the Armed Forces of the Russian Federation.
	Medal "Lieutenant-general Kovalev" Медаль «Генерал-лейтенант Ковалев»	No. 20	2018-01-19	Awarded to officers and civilian personnel of the Military Communications Service of the Armed Forces of the Russian Federation who served in military command and control agencies, military training facilities, and military media outlets for not less than 10 calendar years: for a great personal contribution to the organization of military communications of the Armed Forces of the Russian Federation; for merit in the development of the Military Communications Service of the Armed Forces of the Russian Federation. The medal can be awarded to other citizens of the Russian Federation, for assisting in solving the problems faced in providing communications for the Armed Forces of the Russian Federation.
	Medal "100 Years of Military Commerce" Медаль «100 лет военной торговле»	No. 111	2018-03-07	Awarded to military and civilian personnel of the Armed Forces of the Russian Federation for great personal contribution to the techno-material logistical organization of troops (forces); to citizens of the Russian Federation who previously served (worked) in the military commerce system and made a significant contribution to the trade and consumer support of the Armed Forces of the Russian Federation; to other citizens of the Russian Federation for providing assistance in solving problems faced in the trade and consumer support of the Armed Forces of the Russian Federation.
	Medal "For Merit in Special Activities" Медаль «За заслуги в специальной деятельности»	No. 430	2018-08-02	Text of inception order not yet found for translation to this article.
	Medal "For Diligence in the Performance of Radiological, Chemical and Biological Defense Tasks" Медаль «За усердие при выполнении задач радиационной, химической и биологической защиты»	No. 500	2018-09-18	Awarded to military and civilian personnel of the troops of Radiological, Chemical and Biological Defense of the Armed Forces of the Russian Federation, with at least 5 years of service (work) in the troops of Radiological, Chemical and Biological Defense of the Armed Forces of the Russian Federation, for great personal contribution in providing Radiological, Chemical and Biological Defense in the Armed Forces of the Russian Federation; for achieving high performance indicators in service and work; for the skilful and competent leadership of subordinate personnel; to citizens of the Russian Federation who previously served (worked) in the troops of Radiological, Chemical and Biological Defense of the Armed Forces of the Russian Federation for at least 20 years, to other citizens of the Russian Federation for providing assistance in solving problems faced by the troops of Radiological, Chemical and Biological Defense of the Armed Forces of the Russian Federation.
	Medal "Participant of the Military Maneuvers - Vostok 2018" Медаль «Участнику маневров войск(сил) - Восток 2018»	No. 560	2018-10-09	Awarded to military and civilian personnel of the Armed Forces of the Russian Federation, for high performance in field, naval and aerial skills, achieved during the conduct of the Military Maneuvers - Vostok 2018; for achievements in the development and improvement of techniques and methods of conducting combat operations, increasing the effectiveness in the use of weapons and military equipment, demonstrated during the conduct of the Military Maneuvers - Vostok 2018; for distinction in the training of personnel in the use of weapons and military equipment to conduct the Military Maneuvers - Vostok 2018. May also be awarded to other citizens of the Russian Federation and foreign nationals for assisting in the preparation and conduct of the Military Maneuvers - Vostok 2018.
	Medal "For Achievements in Military-Political Work" Медаль «За достижения в военно-политической работе»	No. 675	2018-11-23	Awarded to military and civilian personnel of the Armed Forces of the Russian Federation, who have served (worked) in Military-Political organs of the Armed Forces of the Russian Federation (bodies who work with personnel of the Armed Forces of the Russian Federation, bodies of educational work of the Armed Forces of the Russian Federation) for at least 10 years; for reasonable initiative, diligence and distinction in service; for impeccable and efficient civil service; for conscientious performance of duties; for the exemplary organization of military-political work; for maintaining a constant high level of moral; to other citizens of the Russian Federation for providing assistance in solving problems faced by the Military-Political organs of the Armed Forces of the Russian Federation.
	Medal "For Contributions to Congress and Exhibition Activities" Медаль «За вклад в конгрессно-выставочную деятельность»	No. 711	2018-12-13	Awarded to military and civilian personnel of the Armed Forces of the Russian Federation who made a significant contribution to the development and implementation of congress and exhibition activities of the Armed Forces of the Russian Federation, also to other citizens of the Russian Federation and foreign nationals for assistance in organizing and conducting congress and exhibition events of the Ministry of Defense of the Russian Federation.
	Medal "For Contribution to the Development of the International Army Games" Медаль «За вклад в развитие Армейских международных игр»	No. 50	2019-02-08	Awarded to military and civilian personnel of the Armed Forces of the Russian Federation who made a significant contribution to the development of the International Army Games; for merit and distinction displayed in the preparation and conduct of the Army International Games; for excellent performance in field (aerial, naval) training in the course of the International Army Games; also awarded to other citizens of the Russian Federation and foreign nationals for assistance in organizing and conducting the International Army Games.
	Medal "Participant in the Liquidation of the Consequences of the Emergency Situation on the Bureya River" Медаль «Участнику ликвидации последствий чрезвычайной ситуации на реке Бурея»	No. 65	2019-02-08	Awarded to military and civilian personnel of the Armed Forces of the Russian Federation, and to other citizens of the Russian Federation: for selfless work, decisive and skilful actions in the aftermath of the emergency situation on the Bureya river in 2019; for the successful planning, support and management of actions of subordinates in the performance of tasks to eliminate the consequences of the emergency situation on the Bureya river in 2019; for assisting in carrying out, accompanying and ensuring the completion of activities to eliminate the consequences of the emergency situation on the Bureya river in 2019.
	Medal "For Service in the Strategic Missile Forces" Медаль «За службу в Ракетных войсках стратегического назначения»	No. 174	2019-03-28	Awarded to military personnel and federal civil servants serving in the Strategic Missile Forces, if previously awarded the decoration (medal) of the Ministry of Defense of the Russian Federation "Chief Marshal of Artillery Nedelin" or the decoration of the Ministry of Defense of the Russian Federation "For Combat Duty in the Strategic Missile Forces": for reasonable initiative, diligence and distinction in service; for impeccable and efficient civil service; for merit in the planning, organization and security of combat assignments; for excellence during military duty, for exemplary performance of official (special) duties. May also be awarded to other citizens of the Russian Federation who previously served in the Strategic Missile Forces, for providing assistance in solving problems faced by the Strategic Missile Forces.
	Medal "Chief Marshal of Artillery Nedelin" Медаль «Главный маршал артиллерии Неделин»	No. 175	2019-03-28	Awarded to military and civilian personnel of the Strategic Missile Forces, who have served (worked) in the Strategic Missile Forces for at least 10 years: for reasonable initiative, diligence and distinction in service; for impeccable and efficient civil service; for conscientious performance of official duties; for distinction displayed in the performance of official (special) duties, while carrying out combat duties, in fulfilling special assignments; for a significant contribution to the Strategic Missile Forces. May also be awarded to other citizens of the Russian Federation for providing assistance in solving problems faced by the Strategic Missile Forces.
	Medal "For Contributions to the Development of International Military Cooperation" Медаль «За вклад в развитие международного военного сотрудничества»	No. 247	2019-04-27	Awarded to military and civilian personnel of the Armed Forces of the Russian Federation for significant contribution to the development of international military cooperation, for merit and distinction displayed during the preparation and conduct of joint military exercises, international humanitarian, educational and cultural events, the implementation of international obligations in the field of arms control, preparation and conclusion of international treaties and agreements, as well as other merits in the field of international military cooperation. May also be awarded to other citizens of the Russian Federation and foreign nationals for providing assistance in solving problems faced in the field of international military cooperation.
	Medal "Colonel-General Byzov" Медаль «Генерал-полковник Бызов»	No. 373	2019-07-06	Awarded to military and civilian personnel of the Topographic Service of the Armed Forces of the Russian Federation with at least ten years of service (work) in the Topographic Service of the Armed Forces of the Russian Federation for displaying reasonable initiative, diligence and who made a great personal contribution to the development and improvement of the topographic, geodetic and navigational support to the Armed Forces of the Russian Federation. For impeccable and efficient public civil service and for conscientious performance of labor duties. May also be awarded to other citizens of the Russian Federation for their assistance in solving the tasks assigned to the Topographic Service of the Armed Forces of the Russian Federation.
	Medal "For Contribution to Strengthening the Defense of the Russian Federation" Медаль «За вклад в укрепление обороны Российской Федерации»	No. 464	2019-09-04	Awarded to military and civilian personnel of the Armed Forces of the Russian Federation for a significant contribution to strengthening the defense of the Russian Federation; for the successful organization and development of interaction of the Armed Forces of the Russian Federation with the federal organs of the Russian Federation, federal organs of constituent entities of the Russian Federation, and local organs and organizations of the Russian Federation in solving problems aimed at strengthening the defense of the Russian Federation. May also be awarded to citizens of the Russian Federation for assisting in solving the tasks assigned to the Armed Forces of the Russian Federation aimed at strengthening the defense of the Russian Federation.
	Medal "For Contribution to the Implementation of the State Armaments Program" Медаль «За вклад в реализацию государственной программы вооружения»	No. 504	2019-09-04	Awarded to military and civilian personnel of the Armed Forces of the Russian Federation for a contribution to the timely and high-quality planning of activities of the state armaments program, assignment and implementation of tasks of the state defense commissioned for the development (modernization), production (repair) of systems, weapon systems and models, military and special equipment and their components, achieved results in the organization of operation of weapons, of military and special equipment. May also be awarded to citizens of the Russian Federation and foreign nationals for assisting in solving the tasks assigned to the Armed Forces of the Russian Federation in implementing the State Armaments Program.
	Medal "For Distinction in Financial Security" Медаль «За отличие в финансовом обеспечении»	No. 530	2019-09-13	Awarded to military and civilian personnel of the Financial and Economic Service of the Armed Forces of the Russian Federation with at least fifteen years of service (work) in the Financial and Economic Service of the Armed Forces of the Russian Federation: for reasonable initiative, diligence and distinction in service; for impeccable and efficient civil service; for conscientious performance of labor duties; for achieving high performance in areas of activity. May also be awarded to other citizens of the Russian Federation who have assisted in solving the tasks assigned to the Financial and Economic Service of the Armed Forces of the Russian Federation.
	Medal "For participation in the military parade to mark the 75th anniversary of Victory in the Great Patriotic War of 1941–1945" Медаль «За участие в военном параде в ознаменование 75-летия Победы в Великой Отечественной войне 1941–1945 гг»	No. 590	2019-10-17	Awarded to military and civilian personnel of the Armed Forces of the Russian Federation and to foreign troops, military formations and bodies, for active participation, for the training and preparation of personnel, of weapons and of military equipment, for assistance in the preparation and conduct of the military parade to mark the 75th anniversary of Victory in the Great Patriotic War of 1941–1945 in Moscow, in other Hero cities, as well as in cities where military districts headquarters, fleets headquarters, combined forces headquarters as well as the Caspian Flotilla headquarters are located; for distinction displayed during the military parade in Moscow, in other Hero Cities, as well as in cities where military districts headquarters, fleets headquarters, combined forces headquarters as well as the Caspian Flotilla headquarters are located.
	Jubilee Medal "100 Years of the Air Force Academy named after Professor N. E. Zhukovsky and Y. A. Gagarin" Юбилейная медаль «100 лет Военно-воздушной академии имени профессора Н. Е. Жуковского и Ю. А. Гагарина»	No. 747	2019-12-19	Awarded to military and civilian personnel of the Air Force Military Training Center "Air Force Academy named after Professor N. E. Zhukovsky and Y. A. Gagarin" for reasonable initiative, zeal and distinction in service, for conscientious performance of labor duties, for distinction in the organization of daily activities and the development of the educational process. May also be awarded to other citizens of the Russian Federation who have assisted in solving the tasks assigned to the academy.
	Medal "Marshall of Engineering Troops Chestopalov" Медаль «Маршал инженерных войск Шестопалов»	No. 752	2019-12-19	Awarded to military and civilian personnel of the Armed Forces of the Russian Federation with at least ten years of service (work) in the military construction complex of the Ministry of Defense of the Russian Federation, for reasonable initiative, diligence and distinction in service; for impeccable and efficient civil service; for conscientious performance of official duties; for a significant personal contribution to improving the efficiency of crucial construction and the technical level of military-construction production; for the development and successful implementation of new technologies aimed at improving the construction of facilities of the military and public infrastructures, for the application of innovative technologies in the construction (reconstruction) or overhaul of crucial military facilities, for the production of modern high-quality energy-saving and environmentally friendly construction materials, designs and products, intended for the construction of facilities of the military and public infrastructures, for the performance of special tasks assigned to the military construction complex of the Ministry of Defense of the Russian Federation. May also be awarded to other citizens of the Russian Federation who have assisted in solving the tasks assigned to the military construction complex of the Ministry of Defense of the Russian Federation.
	Medal "Lieutenant General Karpinsky" Медаль «Генерал-лейтенант Карпинский»	No. 333	2020-07-27	Awarded to military and civilian personnel of the Armed Forces of the Russian Federation, with at least 10 years of service (work) in the Clothing Service of the Armed Forces of the Russian Federation, for reasonable initiative, diligence and distinction in service; for impeccable and efficient civil service; for conscientious performance of official duties; for a significant personal contribution in ensuring the development and improvement of military clothing. The medal may also be awarded to citizens of the Russian Federation who have served (worked) for at least 20 years in the Clothing Service of the Armed Forces of the Russian Federation, to other citizens of the Russian Federation for assistance in solving the tasks assigned to the Clothing Service.
	Medal "For the fight against the COVID-19 pandemic" Медаль «За борьбу с пандемией COVID-19»	No. 414	2020-09-03	Awarded to military and civilian personnel of the Armed Forces of the Russian Federation, for significant contribution to the fight against the new COVID-19 coronavirus pandemic, for dedication and professionalism displayed in the performance of military and official duties, conscientious performance of official duties in the provision of medical and other assistance aimed at combating the coronavirus infection; for merit in the development and implementation of treatments for the coronavirus infection; for the highly efficient organization of work on diagnostics and treatment of the coronavirus infection. May also be awarded to other citizens of the Russian Federation or foreign nationals, assisting the Armed Forces of the Russian Federation in solving problems in the fight against the coronavirus infection.
	Medal "For Merit in Ensuring Flight Safety" Медаль «За заслуги в обеспечении безопасности полетов»	No. 490	2020-09-29	Awarded to military and civilian personnel of the Armed Forces of the Russian Federation with not less than five years of service, for merit in the performance of duties to ensure flight safety and prevent aviation accidents. May also be awarded to other citizens of the Russian Federation who have assisted in tasks to ensure flight safety.
	Medal "Lieutenant General Belyusov" Медаль «Генерал-лейтенант Белюсов»	No. 500	2020-10-02	Awarded to military and civilian personnel of the Armed Forces of the Russian Federation, for special merit in official service (work) and scientific activities aimed at ensuring the protection of state secrets of the Armed Forces of the Russian Federation (ZGT VS); for substantial personal contribution to the development and improvement of the ZGT VS service. The medal may also be awarded to other citizens of the Russian Federation, for assistance in solving the tasks assigned to the ZGT VS service.
	Jubilee Medal "200th Anniversary of the Peter the Great Strategic Missile Forces Military Academy" Юбилейная медаль «200 лет Военной академии РВСН имени Петра Великого»	No. 629	2020-11-26	Awarded to military and civilian personnel of the Peter the Great Strategic Missile Forces Military Academy, for reasonable initiative, diligence and distinction in service; for the conscientious performance of labor duties; for distinction in the development of the educational process and in everyday activities. The medal may also be awarded to other citizens of the Russian Federation, for assistance in solving the tasks assigned to the academy.
	Medal "Colonel General of the Medical Service Smirnov" Медаль «Генерал-полковник медицинской службы Смирнов»	No. 685	2020-12-15	Awarded to military and civilian personnel of the Armed Forces of the Russian Federation with not less than fifteen years of service (work) within the Medical Service of the Armed Forces of the Russian Federation, for reasonable initiative, diligence and distinction in service, for the conscientious performance of labor duties; for a great personal contribution to the development of medical support for troops (forces); for special achievements and exemplary performance of tasks and measures of medical support for troops (forces). The medal may also be awarded to other citizens of the Russian Federation who have served (worked) for at least 20 years in the Medical Service of the Armed Forces of the Russian Federation, for assistance in solving the tasks assigned to the Medical Service, as well as for a great personal contribution and special achievements in the development of medical support for the Armed Forces of the Russian Federation.
	Jubilee Medal "100th Anniversary of the V.P. Chkalov State Flight Test Center" Юбилейная медаль «100 лет Государственному лётно-испытательному цеетру имени В.П.Чкалова»	No. 139	2021-03-10	Establishment order being translated for this article.
	Medal "For Service in Information Support" Медаль «За заслуги в информационном обеспечении»	No. 256	2021-05-05	Awarded to military and civilian personnel of the Information and Mass Communications Department of the Defense Ministry of the Russian Federation as well as of information support bodies of the Armed Forces of the Russian Federation, with not less than three years of service (work) in the Mass Communications Department of the Defense Ministry of the Russian Federation or information support bodies of the Armed Forces of the Russian Federation, for reasonable initiative, diligence and distinction in service; for impeccable and efficient civil service; for the conscientious performance of labor duties; for distinction displayed in the performance of official duties, while performing special assignments; for significant contributions to the development of information support bodies of the Armed Forces of the Russian Federation.
	Medal "Konstantin Simonov" Медаль «Константин Симонов»	No. 257	2021-05-05	Awarded to military and civilian personnel of the Information and Mass Communications Department of the Defense Ministry of the Russian Federation as well as of information support bodies of the Armed Forces of the Russian Federation, with not less than five years of service (work) in the Mass Communications Department of the Defense Ministry of the Russian Federation or information support bodies of the Armed Forces of the Russian Federation, for reasonable initiative, diligence and distinction in service; for impeccable and efficient civil service; for the conscientious performance of labor duties; for distinction displayed in the performance of official duties, while performing special assignments; for significant contributions to the development of information support bodies of the Armed Forces of the Russian Federation. The medal may also be awarded to other citizens of the Russian Federation and to foreign nationals for assistance in solving the tasks assigned to the Information and Mass Communications Department of the Defense Ministry of the Russian Federation or to information support bodies of the Armed Forces of the Russian Federation.
	Medal "Participant in the Peacekeeping Operation in Nagorno-Karabakh" Медаль «Участнику миротворческой операции в Нагорном Карабахе»	No. 630	2021-10-27	Awarded to military and civilian personnel of the Armed Forces of the Russian Federation for special distinction displayed during the peacekeeping operation in Nagorno-Karabakh; for the successful leadership of the actions of subordinate personnel during the peacekeeping operation in Nagorno-Karabakh; for great personal contribution to the fulfillment of tasks in the peacekeeping operation in Nagorno-Karabakh. The medal may also be awarded to other citizens of the Russian Federation and foreign citizens who provided assistance in solving the assignments assigned to the Armed Forces of the Russian Federation in the peacekeeping operation in Nagorno-Karabakh.
	Medal "For Participant in the Special Military Operation" Медаль «Участнику специальной военной операции»	No. 461	2022-08-10	Established by the order of the Minister of Defense of Russia dated August 10, 2022 No. 461 "On the establishment of the medal of the Ministry of Defense of the Russian Federation "Participant in the Special Military Operation"" for participants in the Russian invasion of Ukraine. According to the regulations on the medal "Participant in the Special Military Operation", it is awarded to military personnel and civilian personnel of the Armed Forces of the Russian Federation for: "reasonable initiative, diligence and distinction in service"; "impeccable and effective civil service"; "conscientious performance of work duties"; "direct performance of tasks in the area of the Special Military Operation"; "successful completion of tasks that contribute to the achievement of the goals of the Special Military Operation". The medal may also be awarded to other citizens of the Russian Federation "who provide assistance in solving the tasks of the Special Military Operation".

=== Decorations "For Merit" ===
Award	Name (English/Russian)	Ministerial Order	Inception Date	Award Criteria
	Decoration "For Merit"; Legal Service of the Armed Forces Знак Отличия «За Заслуги» Юридическая Служба Вооруженных Сил	No. 5 - No. 547	2001-01-31 ---------- 2007-12-07	Awarded to military personnel and members of the civilian staff who have served (worked) in the Legal Service of the Armed Forces for 5 years or more, for distinction in the performance of official duties, in activities aimed at strengthening the rule of law, in ensuring the legality of the activities of central bodies of the military administration, associations, formations, military units and organisations of the Armed Forces of the Russian Federation.
	Decoration "For Merit"; Administrative Departments Personnel of the Ministry of Defence Знак Отличия «За Заслуги» Личного Состава Управления Делами Министерства Обороны	No. 500	2001-12-29	Awarded to military personnel of the Administrative Departments of the Ministry of Defence of the Russian Federation with at least one year of seniority in the office, for initiative, diligence and distinction displayed in the performance of military duties; also awarded to members of the civilian staff who have worked in the office for at least five years, for high performance in scientific and socio-cultural activities.
	Decoration "For Merit"; Military Personnel of Ground Forces Знак Отличия «За Заслуги» Военнослужащих Сухопутных Войск.	No. 540	2001-12-30	Awarded to officers and warrant officers serving in the Ground Forces: for exemplary performance of military duties and high performance; for planning, organising and providing leadership; for excellent performance in combat and field training.
	Decoration "For Merit"; Military Personnel of Space Forces Знак Отличия «За Заслуги» Военнослужащих Космических Войск	No. 125 - No. 470	2002-03-19 ---------- 2015-08-01	Was awarded to soldiers of the Space Forces for initiative, diligence and distinction shown in the performance of military duties. May also be awarded to members of the civilian staff of the Space Forces for high performance in business and scientific activities, as well as other persons - for providing effective assistance in performing the tasks assigned to the Space Forces. It was replaced by the Decoration "For merit" of Aerospace Forces in August 2015, it is no longer awarded.
	Decoration "For Merit"; Military Personnel of the Office of Operational Management of the General Staff of the Armed Forces Знак Отличия «За Заслуги» Военнослужащих Главного Оперативного Управления Генерального Штаба Вооруженных Сил	No. 455	2002-11-16	Awarded to generals, officers and warrant officers, serving in the Main Operations Directorate of the General Staff of the Armed Forces of the Russian Federation, for diligence and initiative. displayed in the performance of official duties, and who have served in the Main Operations Directorate of the General Staff of the Armed Forces for at least 3 years.
	Decoration "For Merit"; Military Personnel of the Main Personnel Office of the Ministry of Defence Знак Отличия «За Заслуги» Военнослужащих Главного Управления Кадров Министерства Обороны	No. 165	2003-05-17	Awarded to military personnel serving in the main personnel department of the Ministry of Defence of the Russian Federation for not less than three years of hard work and initiative displayed during the performance of official duties.
	Decoration "For Merit"; Military Personnel of the Mobilization Directorate of the General Staff of the Armed Forces Знак Отличия «За Заслуги» военнослужащих Главного организационно-мобилизационного управления Генерального штаба Вооруженных Сил	No. 308	2003-08-03	Awarded to officers and warrant officers of the Mobilization Directorate of the General Staff of the Armed Forces of the Russian Federation who have served there for at least 3 years, for due diligence and initiative displayed during the performance of official duties.
	Decoration "For Merit"; Air Force Знак Отличия «За Заслуги» Военно-воздушным сил	No. 240 - No. 470	2004-08-13 ---------- 2015-08-01	Was awarded to officers and warrant officers after 5 years or more in the Air Force for exemplary performance of military duties, able and competent leadership of subordinates, high rate of performance; for planning, organizing and carrying out for air defence combat drills and manoeuvres; for high results in the training subordinates or in the development of new weapons’ technology; for professional excellence and superior performance in combat training and field (air) training. It was replaced by the Decoration "For merit" of Aerospace Forces in August 2015, it is no longer awarded
	Decoration "For Merit"; Staff of the Minister of Defence Знак Отличия «За Заслуги» Штаб Министра Обороны	No. 90	2005-03-19	Awarded to military personnel and members of the civilian staff of the Office of the Minister of Defence of the Russian Federation for hard work and initiative displayed in the performance of official duties that have served (worked) in the office for at least 3 years.
	Decoration "For Merit"; Military Personnel of Airborne Troops Знак Отличия «За Заслуги» Военнослужащих Воздушно-Десантных Войск	No. 182	2005-05-06	Awarded to officers and warrant officers serving in Airborne Troops for 5 years or more: for exemplary performance of military duties; for outstanding results in training and in the education of subordinates or in the development of new technology and weapons; for professional excellence and superior performance in combat training.
	Decoration "For Merit"; Personnel Administrative Departments of Information and Public Relations of the Ministry of Defence Знак Отличия «За Заслуги» Личного Состава Управления Информации И Общественных Связей Министерства Обороны	No. 464	2005-11-02	Awarded to military and civilian personnel of the Office of Information and Public Relations of the Ministry of Defense of Russia who have served in the department for at least 3 years: for exemplary performance of military duties and high performance indicators; for diligence and initiative displayed during the performance of official duties.
	Decoration "For merit in educational work" Знак отличия «За заслуги в воспитательной работе»	No. 375	2007-09-27	Awarded to military and civilian personnel of the General Directorate for Educational Work of the Armed Forces of the Russian Federation, bodies of educational work of the Armed Forces and their subordinate organizations: for diligence and initiative demonstrated in the performance of duties in improving the quality and organization of the military educational system, and that have served (worked) in the administrative and educational bodies of military education for at least 10 years. May also be awarded to citizens in the reserves or retired from military service that are serving in the administrative and educational bodies of military education with a total length of service of 25 years or more; also to active military personnel and civilian personnel of military bodies, as well as citizens of the Russian Federation for special assistance in carrying out the tasks entrusted to the management and educational bodies of the MO.
	Decoration "For Merit"; Military Personnel of the Navy Знак Отличия «За Заслуги» Военнослужащих ВМФ	No. 3435	2012-11-03	Ministerial Order was identified but not yet found in its entirety for translation to this article.
	Decoration "For Merit"; Main Directorate of International Military Cooperation Знак Отличия «За Заслуги» Главного управления международного военного сотрудничества	No. 1935	2012-07-17	Ministerial Order was identified but not yet found in its entirety for translation to this article.
	Decoration "For Merit"; Electronic Warfare Troops Знак Отличия «За Заслуги» Войск Радиоэлектронной Борьбы	No. 949	2013-12-23	Ministerial Order was identified but not yet found in its entirety for translation to this article.
	Decoration "For Merit"; Central Armoured Automotive Management Знак Отличия «За Заслуги» Главного автобронетанкового управления	No. 105	2014-02-04	Ministerial Order was identified but not yet found in its entirety for translation to this article.
	Decoration "For Merit"; National Control Centre for the Defence of the Russian Federation Знак Отличия «За Заслуги» Национального центра управления обороной Российской Федерации	No. 910	2014-12-12	Awarded to military and civilian personnel of the Armed Forces of the Russian Federation with service of at least one calendar year in the National Control Centre for the Defence of the Russian Federation: for diligence and initiative displayed during the performance of official and special duties, and high performance indicators in service activities; for services in planning, organizing and ensuring combat duty rosters and the centralized command and control of troops (forces); for professional excellence and positive results in the training and education of subordinate personnel.
	Decoration "For Merit"; Aerospace Forces Знак Отличия «За Заслуги» воздушно-космических сил	No. 470	2015-08-01	Awarded to officers and warrant officers in military service with aerospace forces for five or more calendar years: for the exemplary performance of military duty, skilful and competent management of the actions of subordinates on duty crews, for high performance indicators; for services in the planning, organization and delivery of air defence combat duty crews (operational service); for high results in education of subordinate personnel or in the development of new equipment and weapons; for professional excellence, excellent performance in combat training and field (air) training. An undress ribbon is worn in lieu of the decoration when its wear is not called for.
	Decoration "For Merit"; Military Personnel of Engineering Troops Знак Отличия «За Заслуги» Военнослужащих инженерных войск	No. 670	2015-10-30	Ministerial Order was identified but not yet found in its entirety for translation to this article.
	Decoration "For Merit"; Office of the Ministry of Defense for Civilian Contracts Знак Отличия «За Заслуги» Управления Министерства обороны по работе с обращениями граждан	No. 275	2015-05-22	Ministerial Order was identified but not yet found in its entirety for translation to this article.
	Decoration "For Merit"; Main Directorate for Control and Supervision of Defence Ministry Activities Знак Отличия «За Заслуги» Главного управления контрольной и надзорной деятельности Министерства обороны	No. 690	2015-11-14	Ministerial Order was identified but not yet found in its entirety for translation to this article.
	Decoration "For Merit"; Military Automotive Inspectorate of the Ministry of Defence Знак Отличия «За Заслуги» Военной автомобильной инспекции Министерства обороны	No. 715	2015-11-28	Ministerial Order was identified but not yet found in its entirety for translation to this article.
	Decoration "For Merit"; Financial and economic service of the Armed Forces Знак Отличия «За Заслуги» Финансово-экономической службы Вооруженных Сил	No. 60	2016-02-15	Ministerial Order was identified but not yet found in its entirety for translation to this article.
	Decoration "For Merit"; Main Department for scientific research and technological support of advanced technologies Знак Отличия «За Заслуги» Главного управления научно-исследовательской деятельности и технологического сопровожденния передовых технологий	No. 145	2016-03-23	Ministerial Order was identified but not yet found in its entirety for translation to this article.
	Decoration "For Merit"; Main Directorate for Rockets and Artillery of the Ministry of Defence Знак Отличия «За Заслуги» Главного ракетно-артиллернийского управления Министерства обороны	No. 310	2016-05-30	Ministerial Order was identified but not yet found in its entirety for translation to this article.
	Decoration "For Merit"; Strategic Rocket Forces Знак Отличия «За Заслуги» Ракетных Войск Стратегического Назначения	No. 805	2016-12-05	Awarded to officers, warrant officers and members of the civilian personnel of Strategic Missile Forces, for dedication and initiative displayed during the performance of official duties, for high performance indicators in professional performance, who have served (worked) in the Strategic Missile Forces for at least five years or with a total duration of military and civil service of not less than 10 years; to citizens of the Russian Federation, with previous military service or state civil service in the Strategic Missile Forces with a total duration of military or civil service (seniority) of 20 years or more; to officers, warrant officers and members of the civilian personnel of the Armed Forces of the Russian Federation with military (state civil) service (work) in other military command agencies, as well as to other citizens of the Russian Federation rendering assistance in solving tasks assigned to the Strategic Missile Forces.
	Decoration "For Merit"; Culture Department of the Defense Ministry Знак Отличия «За Заслуги» Департамента культуры Министерства обороны	No. 820	2016-12-16	Awarded to officials of the Department of Culture of the Ministry of Defense of the Russian Federation with a total duration of service (work) in the Armed Forces of the Russian Federation of at least five years, for reasonable initiative, diligence, and distinction in service; for excellent and efficient civil service; for high performance in professional activities. May also be awarded to other citizens of the Russian Federation who assist in the development of culture in the Russian Armed Forces.
	Decoration "For Merit"; Housing Department of the Defense Ministry Знак Отличия «За Заслуги» Департамента жилищного обеспечения Министерства обороны	No. 22	2017-01-11	Awarded to servicemen and members of the civilian staff of the Housing Department of the Defense Ministry of the Russian Federation, with a total length of service (work) in the Housing Department of the Defense Ministry of not less than two (calendar) years: for reasonable initiative, diligence, and distinction in service; for excellent and efficient civil service; for the faithful fulfillment of obligations and high performance in professional activities. May also be awarded to military and civilian personnel of the Armed Forces of the Russian Federation for assistance in solving the housing problems of military personnel and their families, as well as to other citizens of the Russian Federation who assist in solving the tasks assigned to the Housing Department of the Ministry of Defense of the Russian Federation.
	Decoration "For Merit"; Management for the State supervision of nuclear and radiation safety Знак Отличия «За Заслуги» Управления государтвенного надзора за ядерной и редиационной безопасно стью Министерства обороны	No. 145	2017	Ministerial Order was identified but not yet found in its entirety for translation to this article.
	Decoration "For Merit" of the office of the military commandant of Moscow, and of military units subordinated to the military commandant of the city of Moscow Знак Отличия «За Заслуги» военнослужащих военной комендатуры г. Москвы, воинских частей и подразделений, подчиненных военному коменданту г. Москвы	No. 320	2002-08-19	Awarded to military personnel of the Office of the military commandant of Moscow and of military units subordinated to the military commandant of the city of Moscow, for reasonable initiative, diligence and distinction displayed during the performance of official or special duties.
	Decoration "For Merit" of the Main Missile and Artillery Directorate Знак Отличия «За Заслуги» военнослужащих Главного ракетно-артиллерийского управления	No. 425	2002-10-18	Awarded to officers and warrant officers serving in the Main Missile and Artillery Directorate of the Ministry of Defence of the Russian Federation, with at least 1 year of service within the directorate: for exemplary performance of military duties and high performance indicators in service activities; for the successful planning, organization and maintenance of the educational process for alert crews, for excellent performance in combat training, field training of subordinate military units and military control bodies and other distinction displayed during the performance of military duties.
	Decoration "For Merit" for military personnel of the 41st Army Знак Отличия «За Заслуги» военнослужащих 41 армии	No. 155	2006-04-13	Awarded to officers and warrant-officers who have served in the 41st Army for at least three years, for the exemplary performance of military duties and high performance in service activities; for the successful planning, organization and delivery of military training of combat ready troops; for excellent performance in combat training, field training of subordinate military units and military control bodies and other distinction in the performance of military duties.
	Decoration "For Merit" of Department 8 of the General Staff of the Armed Forces of the Russian Federation Знак Отличия «За Заслуги» Восьмого управления Генерального штаба Вооруженных Сил Российской Федерации	No. 120 - No. 260	2008-03-26 ---------- 2013-04-09	Ministerial Order was identified and is awaiting translation.

=== Decorations "For Distinction" ===
Award	Name (English/Russian)	Ministerial Order	Inception Date	Award Criteria
	Decoration "Chief Marshal of Artillery Nedelin" Знак Отличия «Главный Маршал Артиллерии Неделин»	No. 162 - No. 175	1998-04-07 ---------- 2019-03-28	Awarded to military and civilian personnel of the Strategic Missile Forces, as well as veterans of the service, for distinction displayed in the line of normal duties, combat assignments, in carrying out special tasks, for courage and valour in the line of duty, as well as activities strengthening the position of Strategic Missile Forces. No longer awarded, replaced by the Medal "Chief Marshal of Artillery Nedelin" in March 2019.
	Decoration "For Distinction in Battlefield Research" 1st Class Знак «За Отличие В Поисковом Движении» I Степени	No. 505 - No. 342	2007-12-04 ---------- 2008-06-20	Awarded to military and civilian personnel of the armed forces for outstanding personal contribution to the establishment of the names of the dead and the fate of missing servicemen and for active involvement in research for not less than seven years with significant results.
	Decoration "For Distinction in Battlefield Research" 2nd Class Знак «За Отличие В Поисковом Движении» II Степени	No. 505 - No. 342	2007-12-04 ---------- 2008-06-20	Awarded to military and civilian personnel of the armed forces for outstanding personal contribution to the establishment of the names of the dead and the fate of missing servicemen and for active involvement in research for not less than five years with significant results.
	Decoration "For Distinction in Battlefield Research" 3rd class Знак «За Отличие В Поисковом Движении» III Степени	No. 505 - No. 342	2007-12-04 ---------- 2008-06-20	Awarded to military and civilian personnel of the armed forces for outstanding personal contribution to the establishment of the names of the dead and the fate of missing servicemen and for active involvement in research for not less than three years with significant results.
	Decoration "For the best scientific work" 1st class Знак Отличия «За лучшую научную работу» I Степени	No. 565	2013-07-30	Ministerial Order was identified but not yet found in its entirety for translation to this article.
	Decoration "For the best scientific work" 2nd class Знак Отличия «За лучшую научную работу» II Степени	No. 565	2013-07-30	Ministerial Order was identified but not yet found in its entirety for translation to this article.
	Decoration "For the best scientific work" 3rd class Знак Отличия «За лучшую научную работу» III Степени	No. 565	2013-07-30	Ministerial Order was identified but not yet found in its entirety for translation to this article.
	Decoration "Submariner-Hydronaut" Знак Отличия «Подводник-гидронавт»	No. 595	2015-10-09	Ministerial Order was identified but not yet found in its entirety for translation to this article.
	Decoration "Best Young Scientist" Знак отличия «Лучший молодой ученый»	No. 342	2015-06-18	Awarded to the winner of the annual contest "Best Young Scientist of the Ministry of Defense of the Russian Federation".
	Decoration "Laureate of the contest in the field of science" Знак отличия «Лауреат конкурса в области науки»	No. 342	2015-06-18	Awarded to the two second-place winners of the annual contest "Best Young Scientist of the Ministry of Defense of the Russian Federation".
	Decoration "Laureate of the contest in the field of science" Знак отличия «Лауреат конкурса в области науки»	No. 342	2015-06-18	Awarded to the three third-place winners of the annual contest "Best Young Scientist of the Ministry of Defense of the Russian Federation".
	Decoration "For Distinction"; Army Ground Troops Военнослужащих Сухопутных Войск; Знак «За Отличие»	No. 540	2001-12-30	Awarded to soldiers, sergeants, master sergeants, in military service by conscription or by contract in the Ground Forces: for high achievements in the development, operation and maintenance of weapons and military equipment; for carrying out special assignments; for excellent performance in combat training, field training, other services, demonstrated in the performance of military duties.
	Decoration "For Distinction"; Air Force Военно-воздушным сил Знак «За Отличие»	No. 240 - No. 470	2004-08-13 ---------- 2015-08-01	Was awarded to soldiers, sergeants and master sergeants, in military service by conscription or under contract to the Air Force for not less than one year: for high achievements in the development, operation and maintenance of weapons and military equipment; for the successful completion of special assignments; for excellent performance in combat training or highly specialized training. It was replaced by the Decoration "For distinction" of Aerospace Forces in August 2015, it is no longer awarded.
	Decoration "For Distinction"; Airborne Troops Военнослужащих Воздушно-Десантных Войск; Знак «За Отличие»	No. 182	2005-05-06	Awarded to soldiers serving in the Airborne troops who have served at least 1 year: for exemplary performance of military duties, excellent performance in combat training; for high achievements in the development and exploitation of armament systems and military equipment; for the successful completion of special assignments and other distinction shown in the performance of military duty.
	Decoration "For Distinction"; Strategic Rocket Forces Военнослужащих Ракетных Войск Стратегического Назначения; Знак «За Отличие»	No. 195	2006-05-12	Awarded to soldiers, sergeants, master sergeants, in military service by conscription or by contract in the Strategic Missile Forces for not less than 1 year: for exemplary performance of military duties, excellent performance in combat training; for high achievements in the development and maintenance of weapons and military equipment.
	Decoration "For Distinction"; Military Personnel of the Navy Знак «За Отличие» Военнослужащих ВМФ	No. 3435	2012-11-03	Ministerial Order was identified but not yet found in its entirety for translation to this article.
	Decoration "For Distinction"; Electronic Warfare Troops Знак «За Отличие» Войск Радиоэлектронной Борьбы	No. 949	2013-12-23	Ministerial Order was identified but not yet found in its entirety for translation to this article.
	Decoration "For Distinction"; Central Armoured Automotive Management Знак «За Отличие» Главного автобронетанкового управления	No. 105	2014-02-04	Ministerial Order was identified but not yet found in its entirety for translation to this article.
	Decoration "For Distinction"; Aerospace Forces Воздушно-космических Сил; Знак «За Отличие»	No. 470	2015-08-01	Awarded to soldiers, sergeants and master sergeants, in military service under contract in the Aerospace Forces for five years or more (if class qualification at least second class): for outstanding achievements in the development of weapons, military and special equipment, and exemplary military discipline; for the successful fulfillment of special tasks; for excellent performance in combat training and skills for at least two years. An undress ribbon is worn in lieu of the decoration when its wear is not called for.
	Decoration "For Distinction"; Military Personnel of Engineering Troops Знак «За Отличие» Военнослужащих инженерных войск	No. 670	2015-10-30	Ministerial Order was identified but not yet found in its entirety for translation to this article.
	Decoration "For Distinction"; Main Directorate for Rockets and Artillery Знак Отличия «За Отличие» Главного ракетно-артиллернийского управления Министерства обороны	No. 310	2016-05-30	Ministerial Order was identified but not yet found in its entirety for translation to this article.
	Decoration "For Distinction"; Special Service of the Armed Forces Знак «За Отличие» Специальная Служба Вооруженных Сил	No. 554	1998-12-12	Awarded to officers of the Special Service of the Armed Forces for the successful implementation of measures to prevent unauthorised use of weapons; for excellent results achieved in the development, operation and maintenance of weapons and military equipment of the Special Service of the Armed Forces of Russia.
	Honorary Decoration "For Distinction"; Special Service of the Armed Forces Почетный Знак «За отличие» Специальная служба Вооруженных Сил	No. 554	1998-12-12	Awarded to military personnel or civilians that are not members of the Special Service of the Armed Forces of Russia, that have made a significant contribution to the prevention of unauthorised use of weapons.
	Decoration for "Officer of the Rear of the Armed Forces" Знак Отличия «Офицеров Тыла Вооруженных Сил»	No. 21	2000-01-16	Awarded to officers of the Rear of the Armed Forces of the Russian Federation for diligence and distinction in the performance of duties, for courage and valour during service, as well as for great personal contribution to the development and strengthening the rear of the Armed Forces of the Russian Federation.
	Decoration for "Officer of Engineering Troops" Знак Отличия «Офицеров Инженерных Войск»	No. 315	2000-08-18	Awarded to officers of engineering troops of the Armed Forces of the Russian Federation, or serving in higher military command formations in the field of military engineering, for distinction, initiative and diligence displayed in the performance of official duties.
	Decoration "For Service in the Military Offices of the Defense Ministry of the Russian Federation" Знак Отличия «Военнослужащих Военных Представительств Министерства Обороны Российской Федерации»	No. 110	2001-03-23	Awarded to soldiers performing military service in the offices of the Ministry of Defence of the Russian Federation, for zeal, initiative and diligence displayed in the performance of military duties.
	Decoration "For Service in the Environmental Protection Office of the Defense Ministry of the Russian Federation" Знак Отличия «За обеспечение экологической безопасности Вооруженных Сил Российской Федерации»	No. 404	2001-03-10	Awarded to military personnel of the Office of the Chief of Environmental Protection of the Armed Forces of the Russian Federation and subordinate control units, as well as to military environmental services of the central military command of the Armed Forces, military districts, fleets, military training institutions, and of other military units, for exemplary performance of duties, performing specific tasks, personal contribution to the organization and provision of ecological protection of the Armed Forces of the Russian Federation.
	Decoration for "Officers of the Main Directorate of the General Staff of the Armed Forces of the Russian Federation" Знак Отличия «Офицеров Главного управления Генерального штаба Вооруженных Сил Российской Федерации»	No. 460	2005-11-03	Awarded to officers of the Main Directorate of the General Staff of the Armed Forces of the Russian Federation with at least five years service in the department who made a significant contribution in addressing the challenges facing the General Directorate of the General Staff of the Armed Forces of the Russian Federation, for exemplary performance of military duties and high performance in service activities, for due diligence and initiative shown during the performance of official duties.
	Decoration "For Distinction"; Military Organs of Technical-Material Security Знак «За Отличие» Военнослужащих органов материально-технического обеспечения	No. 435	2013-06-06	Ministerial Order was identified but not yet found in its entirety for translation to this article.

=== Decorations for Service and Combat Duty ===
Award	Name (English/Russian)	Ministerial Order	Inception Date	Award Criteria
	Decoration "For Service in the Caucasus"; Gold Знак отличия «За Службу на Кавказе» золото	No. 367	2001-08-17	Awarded to officers and warrant officers performing military service in the North Caucasus Military District, for initiative and diligence shown in the performance of official duties, as well as taking part in counter terrorism operations in the North Caucasus region of the Russian Federation.
	Decoration "For Service in the Caucasus"; Silver Знак отличия «За Службу на Кавказе» серебро	No. 367	2001-08-17	Awarded to soldiers, sailors, sergeants and petty officers, performing military service in the North Caucasus Military District, for initiative and diligence shown in the performance of official duties, as well as taking part in counter terrorism operations in the North Caucasus region of the Russian Federation.
	Decoration "For Service in the Naval Infantry"; 1st Class Знак отличия «За службу в морской пехоте» I степени	No. 325 - No. 1023	2001-07-24 ---------- 2009-09-23	Awarded to marines for special services and distinction in strengthening the combat readiness of formations and units of marines, in improving personal combat skills, for courage and bravery displayed in the performance of military duties. Promotion to this class requires one year following award of the badge 2nd class unless awarded for courage and bravery or exemplary leadership in the performance of special military operations of marine units.
	Decoration "For Service in the Naval Infantry"; 2nd class Знак отличия «За службу в морской пехоте» II степени	No. 325 - No. 1023	2001-07-24 ---------- 2009-09-23	Awarded to marines with at least 1 year of service for special services and distinction in strengthening the combat readiness of formations and units of marines, in improving personal combat skills, for courage and bravery displayed in the performance of military duties.
	Decoration "For Service in the Strategic Missile Forces" Знак отличия «За службу в Ракетных войсках стратегического назначения»	No. 539 - No. 174	1998-12-04 ---------- 2019-03-28	Awarded to soldiers of the Strategic Missile Forces: for planning, organising and serving in alert areas, for outstanding performance of combat duties, exemplary fulfilment of military duties and high personal performance in service while serving in the Strategic Missile Forces for 10 years or more; for service in the Strategic Missile Forces for 15 years or more if previously awarded the Badge "Chief Marshal of Artillery Nedelin". No longer awarded, replaced by the Medal "For service in the Strategic Missile Forces" in March 2019.
	Decoration "For Service in Military Intelligence" Знак отличия «За службу в военной разведке»	No. 291	1998-06-18	Awarded to military personnel of military intelligence agencies: for services in planning, organisational skills, maintaining security; for exemplary performance of military duties, high personal performance for service in military intelligence agencies. Type 1 award on the left, type 2 award on the right.
	Decoration "For exemplary management of armored vehicles and weapons" Знак отличия «За образцовую эксплуатацию бронетанковой техники и вооружения»	No. 538 - No. 227	1999-11-14 ---------- 2014-09-04	Awarded to members of the Armed Forces for good service and personal contribution to the maintenance of high combat readiness of armoured units and formations and the successful development, skilled application and testing of armoured vehicles. In exceptional cases to individuals who have previously served in research institutions or defence plants in recognition of their achievements in ensuring the development of armoured vehicles and the organisation of effective operation and testing. Type 1 award (left) was awarded between 1999 and 2014. The type 2 award with new ribbon and reverse has been awarded since September 2014.
	Decoration "For Exemplary Service in Automotive Engineering" Знак отличия «За образцовую эксплуатацию автомобильной техники»	No. 538 - No. 227	1999-11-14 ---------- 2014-09-04	Awarded to military and civilian staff of the Armed Forces of the Russian Federation for personal contribution to combat readiness, for improving automotive technology, the organisation and safe implementation into operation of such new technologies. Can also be awarded in exceptional cases to individuals who have previously served in research institutions or defence plants in recognition of their achievements in ensuring the development of armoured vehicles, the organisation and effective operation of automotive testing. Type 1 award (left) was awarded between 1999 and 2014. The type 2 award with new ribbon and reverse has been awarded since September 2014.
	Decoration "For the Development of Armoured Vehicles and Technologies" Знак отличия «За создание бронетанкового вооружения и техники»	No. 538 - No. 227	1999-11-14 ---------- 2014-09-04	Awarded to employees of research institutions, design offices, defence industries and the Armed Forces of Russia for labour, personal contribution to the development, production and testing of armoured vehicles and the development of new processes, with experience in the defence industry and in research organisations of at least 10 years. Type 1 award (left) was awarded between 1999 and 2014. The type 2 award with new ribbon and reverse has been awarded since September 2014.
	Decoration "For the Development of Automotive Technologies" Знак отличия «За создание автомобильной техники»	No. 538 - No. 227	1999-11-14 ---------- 2014-09-04	Awarded to employees of research organizations, design offices and industrial enterprises, and to military personnel of the Armed Forces of the Russian Federation, for conscientious work and personal contribution to the development, production and testing of motor vehicles, with experience in the defence industry or research institutions of at least 10 years. May also be exceptionally awarded to individuals who have previously served in research organizations or defence enterprises, in recognition of their service in the development of armoured vehicles, or the organization of their effective operation and testing. Type 1 award (left) was awarded between 1999 and 2014. The type 2 award with new ribbon and reverse has been awarded since September 2014.
	Commemorative Badge "For Service in Military Communications Units" Памятный знак «За службу в органах военных сообщений»	No. 110	2008-03-12	Ministerial Order was identified but not yet found in its entirety for translation to this article.
	Decoration "Veteran of the Hydrometeorological Service of the Armed Forces" Знак отличия «Ветеран гидрометеорологической службы вооруженных сил»	No. 325	2005-08-08	Ministerial Order was identified but not yet found in its entirety for translation to this article.
	Decoration "Participant in demining in the Chechen Republic and in the Republic of Ingushetia" Памятный знак «Участнику разминирования в Чеченской Республике и Республике Ингушетия»	No. 177	2015-04-04	Awarded to members of the Armed Forces for displaying dedication, courage and bravery, professionalism in the performance of assigned tasks in the detection and neutralization of explosive ordnance in Chechnya and Ingushetia; for direct participation in the organization and control of these tasks.
	Decoration "For Service in Military Intelligence in Airborne Troops" Знак отличия «За службу в военной разведке Воздушно-десантных войск»	No. 740	2014-10-14	Ministerial Order was identified but not yet found in its entirety for translation to this article.
	Commemorative Badge "For Participation in Congress and Exhibition Activities" Памятный знак «За участие в конгрессно-выставочной деятельности»	No. 711	2018-12-13	Awarded to military and civilian personnel of the Armed Forces of the Russian Federation for participating in the preparation and holding of congresses, exhibitions, forums and other congress and exhibition events of the Armed Forces of the Russian Federation; to other citizens of the Russian Federation for providing assistance in organizing and preparing congresses and exhibition events of the Armed Forces of the Russian Federation.
	Decoration "For Combat Duty in the Strategic Rocket Forces" Знак отличия «За боевое дежурство в Ракетных войсках стратегического назначения»	No. 359	2000-07-09	Awarded to soldiers doing military service under contract in the Strategic Rocket Forces with class 2 training qualifications or above and with excellent bearing during alerts, serving in alert crews of the Central Control of Strategic Rocket Forces, of control stations or relay stations, in alert crews at missile regiments or in the regimental command and control station: for 300 cumulative days on alert; serving in alert crews in other military units for 400 cumulative days on alert; to commanders of military units engaged in combat alert duty who rate as "excellent" during alert exercises.
	Decoration "For Combat Duty in the Air Defence Forces" Знак отличия «За боевое дежурство по противовоздушной обороне»	No. 240 - No. 470	2004-08-13 ---------- 2015-08-01	Awarded to soldiers in military service under contract to the Air Force that possess at minimum a first class training qualification, for exemplary performance in military duties on air defence alert crews: for firing solutions while employed in command and control alert crews for at least 5 years; for support and logistical tasks while attached to alert crews for at least 6 years. Commanders of air defence units that rate as "excellent" may also be awarded the badge. An undress ribbon is worn in lieu of the decoration when its wear is not called for.
	Decoration "For a Long Range Cruise" (variant for an aircraft carrier) Знак отличия «За дальний поход»	No. 123 - No. 203	1996-03-31 ---------- 2014-02-04	Awarded to the most distinguished, highly disciplined military and civilian personnel of the Navy who participate in long-range cruises on vessels of the Navy, provided that the missions are successful. For all vessels, transition from one ocean to another; for vessels of under 1000 tons, a 30-day cruise with a distance of at least 500 miles from departure point; for vessels of over 1000 tons, a 45-day cruise depending on home port, Northern Fleet - the limits of the Norwegian Sea, Pacific fleet – 3000 miles from point of origin, Black Sea Fleet and the Novorossiysk Naval district - outside of the Aegean Sea, Baltic fleet - beyond the North Sea. This particular one identifies the ship as the aircraft carrier Admiral Kuznetsov.
	Decoration "For a Long Range Cruise" (variant for surface ships) Знак отличия «За дальний поход»	No. 123 - No. 203	1996-03-31 ---------- 2014-02-04	Awarded to the most distinguished, highly disciplined military and civilian personnel of the Navy who participate in long-range cruises on vessels of the Navy, provided that the missions are successful. For all vessels, transition from one ocean to another; for vessels of under 1000 tons, a 30-day cruise with a distance of at least 500 miles from departure point; for vessels of over 1000 tons, a 45-day cruise depending on home port, Northern Fleet - the limits of the Norwegian Sea, Pacific fleet – 3000 miles from point of origin, Black Sea Fleet and the Novorossiysk Naval district - outside of the Aegean Sea, Baltic fleet - beyond the North Sea.
	Decoration "For a Long Range Cruise" (variant for submarines) Знак отличия «За дальний поход»	No. 123 - No. 203	1996-03-31 ---------- 2014-02-04	Awarded to the most distinguished, highly disciplined military and civilian personnel of the Navy who participate in long-range cruises on vessels of the Navy, provided that the missions are successful. For all vessels, transition from one ocean to another; for vessels of under 1000 tons, a 30-day cruise with a distance of at least 500 miles from departure point; for vessels of over 1000 tons, a 45-day cruise depending on home port, Northern Fleet - the limits of the Norwegian Sea, Pacific fleet – 3000 miles from point of origin, Black Sea Fleet and the Novorossiysk Naval district - outside of the Aegean Sea, Baltic fleet - beyond the North Sea. Specifically for submarines, a cruise with no docking amounting to more than half of the full autonomy of the vessel.
	Decoration "Excellence in Military Construction" Знак отличия «Отличник военного строительства»	No. 295	1999-07-07	Awarded to military and civilian personnel of military units and organisations of construction and quartering of troops of the Ministry of Defence of Russian Federation, for distinction in the performance of official duties, for achieving high results in work, or for active participation in important construction during military operations.
	Decoration "For Valour and Diligence" of the 12th Main Directorate Знак отличия «За доблесть и усердие» 12 Главного управления	No. 65	2006-02-14	Awarded to soldiers of the 12th Main Directorate of the Ministry of Defense with at least 5 years of service within the 12th Main Directorate of the Russian Defense Ministry, for due diligence and initiative displayed during the performance of official duties; for the successful planning, organization and maintenance of the educational processes, combat duty; for excellent performance in combat training, field training of subordinate military units and military administrative bodies; for the successful solution of problems faced by the Head Office, and other distinction in the performance of military duties.

=== Commemorative Badges ===
Award	Name (English/Russian)	Ministerial Order	Inception Date	Award Criteria
	Commemorative Badge "100 Years of Major-General Boris Aleksandrov" Памятный знак «100 лет генерал-майору Борису Александрову»	No. 425	2005-10-06	Awarded to military and civilian personnel of the Armed Forces for great personal contributions to the development of musical culture of the Armed Forces, as well as to others, for assistance in the tasks entrusted to the Armed Forces of Russia.
	Commemorative Badge "300 Years of Naval Infantry" Памятный знак «300-лет морской пехоте»	No. 465 - No. 1023	2005-11-03 ---------- 2009-09-23	Awarded to soldiers, veterans and civilian personnel of the Armed Forces of Russia, as well as to others, who assist in the tasks assigned to the Marines. It is no longer awarded.
	Commemorative Badge "100 Years of the Russian Submarine Forces" Памятный знак «100 лет Подводным силам России»	No. 110 - No. 1023	2006-03-11 ---------- 2009-09-23	Awarded to soldiers, veterans and civilian personnel of the Armed Forces of Russia, as well as to others, who assist in the tasks assigned to the submarine force. It is no longer awarded.
	Commemorative Badge "50th Anniversary of the Moscow Commandant's Office Honour Guard" Памятный знак «50 летие роты почетного караула Военной комендатуры Москвы»	No. 465	2006-05-11	Ministerial Order was identified but not yet found in its entirety for translation to this article and is possibly unpublished to this date.
	Commemorative Badge "Colonel-General Pikalov" Памятный знак «Генерал-полковник Пикалов»	No. 310	2006-08-04	Awarded to soldiers and civilian personnel of the Armed Forces, as well as other citizens of the Russian Federation, for providing assistance in solving the tasks entrusted to the Federal Agency for Safe Storage and Destruction of Chemical Weapons.
	Commemorative Badge "50 Years of the Space Age" Памятный знак «50 лет Космической Эры»	No. 360 - No. 342 - No. 470	2007-09-11 ---------- 2008-06-20 ---------- 2015-08-01	Was awarded to soldiers and veterans of military service in space forces and representatives of the military-industrial complex, for personal contribution to the domestic development of space technologies. It is no longer awarded.
	Commemorative Badge "Nikolai Rimsky-Korsakov" Памятный знак «Николай Римский-Корсаков»	No. 40	2008-01-31	Awarded to military and civilian personnel of the Military Band Service of the Armed Forces of the Russian Federation, for great personal contribution to the development of military music and who have served in (worked for) the Armed Forces for at least 10 years. May also be awarded to other citizens of Russia for assistance in the tasks assigned to the Military Band Service of the Armed Forces.
	Commemorative Badge "200 Years of the Military Topographical Department of the General Staff" Памятный знак «200 лет Военно-топографическому управлению Генерального штаба»	No. 2244	2011-11-18	Awarded to soldiers performing military service in topographic military units and organizations of the Topographical Service of the Armed Forces of the Russian Federation for at least 3 years, for exemplary performance of military duties and high performance indicators in activities; as well as to civilian personnel who have served in topographic military units of the Topographical Service of the Armed Forces of the Russian Federation for at least 3 years, for due diligence and initiative displayed during the performance of official duties.
	Commemorative Badge "200 Years of the Military Science Committee of the Armed Forces of the Russian Federation" Памятный знак «200 лет Военно-научному комитету Вооруженных Сил Руссийской Федерации»	No. 2740	2011-12-30	Ministerial Order was identified but not yet found in its entirety for translation to this article and is possibly unpublished to this date..
	Commemorative Badge "250 Years of the General Staff" Памятный знак «250 лет Генеральному штабу»	No. 7	2013-01-14	Ministerial Order was identified but not yet found in its entirety for translation to this article and is possibly unpublished to this date.
	Commemorative Badge "50 Years of the Mobilization Directorate of the General Staff of the Armed Forces" Памятный знак «50 лет Главному организационно-мобилизационному управлению Генерального штаба»	No. 50	2014-01-13	Awarded to military and civilian personnel as well as to veterans of the Mobilization Directorate of the General Staff of the Armed Forces of the Russian Federation: for personal contribution to the development of the Armed Forces of the Russian Federation; for diligence and initiative displayed during the performance of official or special duties, for the achievement of high performance indicators.
	Commemorative Badge "150 Years of the Western Military District" Памятный знак «150 лет Западному военному округу»	No. 586	2014-08-19	Ministerial Order was identified but not yet found in its entirety for translation to this article and is possibly unpublished to this date.
	Commemorative Badge "100 Years of Air Defense" Памятный знак «100 лет противовоздушной оборонe»	No. 828 - No. 470	2014-11-14 ---------- 2015-08-01	Was awarded to military and civilian personnel of the Air Force who have served (have worked) in Aerospace Defence Forces for at least 20 calendar years, for personal contribution to the development of Russian air defences, for high performance in service; may also be awarded to other personnel, in the reserves or retired, who previously served in the Air Force, Air Defence Forces and Aerospace Defence Troops for great personal contribution to the air defence of Russia. May also be awarded to workers of the defence-industrial complex of the Russian Federation and other citizens of the Russian Federation for assistance in solving the problems faced in air defence. Medal abrogated in August 2015, it is no longer awarded.
	Commemorative Badge "100 Years of Military Air Defense" Памятный знак «100 лет войсковой противовоздушной обороне»	No. 565	2015-09-25	Awarded to military and civilian personnel of military units of Air Defence Ground Forces, for faithful performance of duties, as well as to other citizens of the Russian Federation for assistance in the tasks assigned to military units of Air Defence Ground Forces.
	Commemorative Badge "50 Years of the General Directorate for Deep-Sea Research" Памятный знак «50 лет Главному управлению глубоководных исследований»	No. 600	2015-10-09	Ministerial Order not yet found in its entirety for translation and is possibly unpublished to this date.
	Commemorative Badge "100 Years of the Hydrometeorological Service of the Armed Forces" Памятный знак «100 Лет гидрометеорологической службы вооруженных сил»	No. 665	2015-10-30	Medal was confirmed as having been awarded but Ministerial Order not yet found and is possibly unpublished to this date.
	Commemorative Badge "100 Years of Konstantin Simonov" Памятный знак «100 лет Константину Симонову»	No. 691	2015-11-13	Awarded to media professionals of the Ministry of Defense of the Russian Federation, veterans of Russian journalism and cultural figures, for significant contributions in the ability to produce coverage promoting military service, strengthening the defense capability of Russia.
	Commemorative Badge "300 Years of the Engineering Troops of Russia" Памятный знак «300 лет инженерным войскам России»	No. 348	1996-09-23	Type I is made of silver and is awarded to officers and warrant officers of engineering troops, to other ranks of engineering troops who have served flawlessly in the engineering troops for at least 20 years and have previously been awarded state awards; to former members of the Corps of Engineers and veterans of World War II. Type II is made of brass and is awarded to other ranks of engineering troops who have served flawlessly in the engineering troops for at least 20 years; to other soldiers of the Armed Forces of Russia and other persons who served in the corps of engineers and contributed to their tasks.
	Commemorative Badge "300 Years of the Rear of the Armed Forces" Памятный знак «300 лет Тылу Вооруженных Сил»	No. 523	1999-11-08	Awarded to military personnel, civilian staff and veterans of the Rear Services (Logistics) of the Armed Forces of the Russian Federation, for distinction in the performance of official duties, special assignments, activities aimed at strengthening the Rear Services of the Armed Forces and who served in the Armed Forces 20 years or more.
	Commemorative Badge "300 Years of the Clothing Service of the Armed Forces" Памятный знак «300 лет вещевой службы Вооруженных Сил»	No. 65	2000-02-14	Awarded to military and civilian personnel of the Russian Armed Forces and to veterans of the Clothing Service of the Armed Forces of the Russian Federation with at least 20 years service: for distinction in the performance of official duties, during special assignments, or for activities aimed at strengthening the Rear of the Armed Forces of the Russian Federation.
	Commemorative Badge "300 Years of the Food Service" Памятный знак «300 лет продовольственной службе»	No. 91	2000-02-18	Awarded to military and civilian personnel of the Armed Forces with at least 20 years of service, veterans of the Food Service of the Armed Forces, for distinction in the performance of official duties, for performing special tasks or activities aimed at strengthening the combat readiness of the Food Service of the Armed Forces.
	Commemorative Badge "200 Years of the Ministry of Defence" Памятный знак «200 лет Министерству обороны»	No. 300	2002-08-30	Awarded on the occasion of the 200th Anniversary of the Ministry of Defence of the Russian Federation to persons who actively promoted and assisted in the tasks entrusted to the Armed Forces.

=== Commendations ===
Award	Name (English/Russian)	Ministerial Order	Inception Date	Award Criteria
	Memorable Badge "Minister of Defense of the Russian Federation" Памятный знак «Министра обороны Российской Федерации»	No. 59	1999-04-14	Awarded to soldiers, citizens of Russia and foreign citizens who have made a significant contribution to the development of the RF Armed Forces and interstate relations in the military field. Worn on the right lapel.
	Memorable Badge "Chief of the General Staff of the Armed Forces of the Russian Federation" Памятный знак «начальника Генерального штаба Вооруженных Сил Российской Федерации»	No. 346	1999-08-06	Awarded to soldiers, citizens of Russia and foreign citizens who have made a significant contribution to the development of the RF Armed Forces and interstate relations in the military field. Worn on the right lapel.
	Memorable Badge "Commander in chief of the Air Force" Памятный знак «главнокомандующего Военно-воздушными сил»	No. 240 - No. 470	2004-08-13 ---------- 2015-08-01	Was awarded to military and civilian personnel who have served (have worked) in the Air Force for at least 10 years, veterans of the Air Force and Air Defence Forces, or to others who have made significant contributions to the Air Force for assistance in the tasks assigned to the Air Force. Replaced by the memorable badge "Commander of Aerospace Forces", it is no longer awarded.
	Memorable Badge "Commander of Aerospace Forces" Памятный знак «главнокомандующего Воздушно-космическими сил»	No. 470	2015-08-01	Awarded to military and civilian personnel of the Armed Forces who have served (worked) in Aerospace Forces for at least 10 years, veterans of the Air Force, of Air Defence Forces and Aerospace Forces, or to others who have made significant contributions to the development of Aerospace Forces and assistance in solving the tasks assigned to Aerospace Forces. Worn on the left lapel. An undress ribbon is worn in lieu of the decoration when its wear is not called for.
	Memorable Badge "Commander in chief of the Land Forces" Памятный знак «главнокомандующего Сухопутными войсками»	No. 585	2013-08-12	Awarded to military personnel, to civilian staff members of the Land Forces, as well as to other citizens of the Russian Federation and foreign citizens who have made significant contributions to the development of the Land Forces and to inter-state relations in the sphere of military cooperation in the development of the Land Forces. Worn on the left lapel.
	Memorable Badge "Commander in chief of the Navy" Памятный знак «главнокомандующего Военно-Морским Флотом»	No. 3430	2012-11-03	Ministerial Order was identified but not yet found in its entirety for translation to this article.
	Memorable Badge "Commander of the Railway Troops" Памятный знак «Командующего Железнодорожными войсками»	No. 330	2007-08-14	Awarded to military and civilian personnel of Railway Troops who have served faithfully and (or) worked in Railway Troops for at least 10 years, and to others who have made significant contributions to the development of Railway Troops and for assistance in carrying out the tasks assigned to Railway Troops. Worn on the left lapel.
	Memorable Badge "Chief of the Central Armoured Automotive Management" Памятный знак «Начальника Главного автобронетанкового управления»	No. 414	2014-06-11	Ministerial Order was identified but not yet found in its entirety for translation to this article.
	Memorable Badge "Air Defence of Russia" Памятный знак «Противовоздушная оборона России»	No. 125	2005-04-10	Awarded to military and civilian personnel who have served (worked) in the Air Defence Forces for not less than 15 years, veterans of the Air Force (Defence Forces) and other individuals who have made a significant contribution to the development of Russia's air defence and assist in addressing the tasks assigned to the Air Force.
	Memorable Badge "Constantine Badge" Памятный знак «Константиновский знак»	No. 540	2005-12-20	Awarded to graduates with honours of Naval Academies for initiative and diligence displayed in the study of naval sciences, research and development work in the construction, operation and implementation of weapons and military equipment; great contribution to the study of Russian history and in strengthening Russia's statehood, preservation and development of Russian naval traditions, high military discipline; scientific, literary or artistic work on Russian history, geography and oceanography, and other humanitarian and socio-economic sciences, aimed at strengthening patriotism and devotion to the homeland.
	"Certificate of honour of the Defense Ministry of the Russian Federation" «Почетная грамота министерства обороны Российской Федерации»	No. 220	2017-04-10	Awarded to servicemen for initiative, diligence and distinction in service; to federal civil servants of the Ministry of Defense who have a total length of service of at least 10 years and a civil service record in the Ministry of Defense of at least 5 years, for impeccable and efficient civil service; to employees who have a total length of service of at least 10 years and work experience in military units and organizations of the Armed Forces in civilian positions for at least 5 years, for conscientious performance of work duties; to other citizens of the Russian Federation and foreign citizens for rendering assistance in solving the tasks assigned to the Armed Forces. A lapel pin for wear on civilian attire or military uniform accompanies the certificate.

=== Decorations for excellence ===
Award	Name (English/Russian)	Ministerial Order	Inception Date	Award Criteria
	Decoration "Excellent in Ground Troops" Знак отличия «Отличник Сухопутных войск»	No. ?	?	Ministerial Order was not identified but award creation has been confirmed.
	Decoration "Excellent in the Air Force" Знак отличия «Отличник Военно-воздушных сил»	No. ?	?	Ministerial Order was not identified but award creation has been confirmed.
	Decoration "Excellent in the Navy" Знак отличия «Отличник Военно-Морского Флота»	No. 204	2014-02-04	Ministerial Order was identified but not yet found in its entirety for translation to this article.
	Decoration "Excellent in Space Forces" Знак отличия «Отличник Космических войск»	No. ?	?	Ministerial Order was not identified but award creation has been confirmed.
	Decoration "Excellent in Military Intelligence" Знак отличия «Отличник военной разведки»	No. 490	2014-07-18	Ministerial Order was identified but not yet found in its entirety for translation to this article.
	Decoration "Excellent in Electronic Warfare Troops" Знак отличия «Отличник войск радиоэлектронной борьбы»	No. 949	2013-09-23	Ministerial Order was identified but not yet found in its entirety for translation to this article.
	Decoration "Excellent in Special Security" Знак отличия «Отличник специального обеспечения»	No. 383	2014-06-02	Ministerial Order was identified but not yet found in its entirety for translation to this article.
	Decoration "Excellent in the Sentry Service" Знак отличия «Отличник караульной службы»	No. 270	2015-05-19	Ministerial Order was identified but not yet found in its entirety for translation to this article.
	Decoration "Excellent in the Armoured Automotive Services" Знак отличия «Отличник автобронетанковой службы»	No. 529	2015-09-14	Ministerial Order was identified but not yet found in its entirety for translation to this article.
	Decoration "Excellent in the Service of Quartering and Settlement" Знак отличия «Отличник расквартирования и обустройства»	No. 55	2007-02-01	Ministerial Order was identified but not yet found in its entirety for translation to this article.
	Decoration "Excellent in Rocket and Artillery Troops" Знак отличия «Отличник ракетных войск и артиллерии»	No. 3520	2012-11-16	Awarded to sergeants and soldiers called up or under contract serving in Rocket and Artillery Troops of ground forces that achieved excellent results in firing solutions and final checks, who have no disciplinary actions on their records.
	Decoration "Excellent in Airborne Troops" Знак отличия «Отличник Воздушно-десантные войск»	No. ?	?	Ministerial Order was not identified but award creation has been confirmed.
	Decoration "Excellent in Strategic Missile Forces" Знак отличия «Отличник Ракетные войск стратегического назначения»	No. ?	?	Ministerial Order was not identified but award creation has been confirmed.
	Decoration "Excellent in Communication Troops" Знак отличия «Отличник войск связи»	No. 565	2016-09-13	Ministerial Order was identified but not yet found in its entirety for translation to this article.
	Decoration "Excellent in Railway Troops" Знак отличия «Отличник Железнодорожных Войск»	No. 45	2017-01-23	Awarded to soldiers, sergeants and sergeant-majors of Railway Troops for high results achieved in combat training, for the development, operation and maintenance of weapons and military equipment; for the successful execution of special tasks; for other services in the performance of military duties.

== Railway Troops of the Russian Federation ==
Russian Railway Troops were integrated into the Rear of the Armed Forces of the Russian Federation on 9 March 2004 by decree No. 314 of President Vladimir Putin. Below are the awards specific to that service.

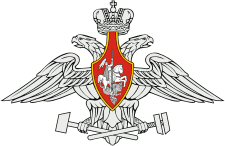

=== Medals ===
Award	Name (English/Russian)	Ministerial Order	Inception Date	Award Criteria
	Medal "For Distinction in Service" Медаль «За отличие в службе»	No. 46	1999-02-04	Awarded to warrant officers and officers of the Railway Troops of the Russian Federation who faultlessly served the service for not less than five years on military posts, who demonstrated initiative, dedication and distinction in official responsibilities and made great personal contributions to resolving the special challenges faced by the service, for training and educating subordinates, for the strengthening of military readiness, research, legal and personnel support for the Railway Troops of the Russian Federation.
	Medal "For Valour" 1st Class Медаль «За доблесть» I степени	No. 127	2001-04-10	Awarded to military personnel of the Railway Troops of the Russian Federation for outstanding contribution to the development of the service, for success in maintaining units at high combat readiness, for excellent performance in training and other achievements during military service.
	Medal "For Valour" 2nd Class Медаль «За доблесть» II степени	No. 127	2001-04-10	Awarded to civilian personnel of military units of the Railway Troops of the Russian Federation for outstanding achievements and outstanding performance of research institutions, enterprises, organizations and military educational institutions of vocational education for the service.
	Medal "For Impeccable Service" 1st Class Медаль «За безупречную службу» I степени	No. 47	1999-02-04	Awarded to members of the Railway Troops of the Russian Federation for 20 years of good service.
	Medal "For Impeccable Service" 2nd Class Медаль «За безупречную службу» II степени	No. 47	1999-02-04	Awarded to members of the Railway Troops of the Russian Federation for 15 years of good service.
	Medal "For Impeccable Service" 3rd Class Медаль «За безупречную службу» III степени	No. 47	1999-02-04	Awarded to members of the Railway Troops of the Russian Federation for 10 years of good service.
	Jubilee Medal "150 Years of Railway Troops of Russia" Юбилейная медаль «150 лет ЖДВ России»	No. 352	2000-08-23	Awarded to military personnel of the Railway Troops of the Russian Federation if previously awarded government or departmental awards of the Russian Federation or the USSR and who faultlessly served for more than 10 years; to generals, officers, ensigns, warrant officers, sergeants and soldiers, retired, dismissed from the Railway Troops of the Russian Federation, of the Armed Forces of the USSR, when previously awarded government or departmental awards of the Russian Federation or the USSR and who faultlessly served for Railway Troops for 20 years or more; to civilian personnel of military units, research institutions, enterprises, organizations and military educational institutions of vocational education for Russian railway troops when previously awarded government or departmental awards the Russian Federation or the Soviet Union and worked flawlessly in the railway troops for 10 years or more; to citizens who have made a significant contribution to the tasks entrusted to the Railway Troops of the Russian Federation.

=== Decorations ===
Award	Name (English/Russian)	Ministerial Order	Inception Date	Award Criteria
	Decoration "For Merit" Знак отличия «За заслуги»	No. 330	2007-08-14	Awarded to officers and warrant officers with 5 years or more in Railway Troops (ZHDV): for professional excellence and superior performance in combat training; for exemplary performance of military duties, able and competent leadership.
	Decoration "For Distinction" Знак отличия «За отличие»	No. 330	2007-08-14	Awarded to soldiers, sergeants and master sergeants with no less than one year of service in Railway Troops (ZHDV): for high achievements in the development, operation and maintenance of weapons and military equipment; for the successful completion of special assignments; for excellent performance in combat training.

=== Badges ===
Award	Name (English/Russian)	Ministerial Order	Inception Date	Award Criteria
	Badge "Veteran of Railway Troops" Знак «Ветеран Железнодорожных Войск»	No. 171	1998-06-01	Awarded to soldiers and veterans of the Railway Troops of the Russian Federation who faultlessly served for at least 20 years in the service, for great personal contribution in resolving the special challenges faced by the service, training and education of personnel, the strengthening of military readiness, science and research, legal and personnel support for the Railway Troops.

== Federal Agency for Special Construction (SpetsStroj Russia) ==
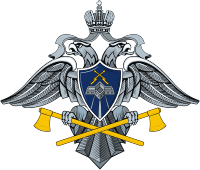

By order of Presidential decree 727 of 29 December 2016, the Federal Agency for Special Construction was stood down on 1 July 2017 as an independent entity and its organs were absorbed by the Ministry of Defence.

=== Medals ===
Award	Name (English/Russian)	Ministerial Order	Inception Date	Award Criteria
	Decoration "For Merit in Special Construction" Почётный знак «За заслуги в области специального строительства»	No. ? - No. 727	2010-06 ---------- 2016-12-29	Awarded to military and civilian personnel of engineering and technical units with at least 20 years of service (work) of which at least 15 were within SpetsStroj of Russia, for merit and personal contribution to the development of special construction, for the successful execution of production orders, work of the highest quality, introduction of new technologies, effective work rationalization, widespread dissemination of best practices, the implementation of measures aimed at improving the efficiency of the production organization. May also be awarded to employees of other ministries, departments and public organizations, who have made a significant contribution at solving the common problems faced in the field of special construction.
	Medal "For Distinction in Service" Медаль «За отличие в службе»	No. 51 - No. 727	2001-02-22 ---------- 2016-12-29	Awarded to soldiers who served flawlessly in the central administration of the Federal Agency for Special Construction, in the military, technical and engineering training and development of specialists, in military formations with at least 5 years on military posts; to officers or warrant officers for initiative, diligence, and distinction who made a great contribution to overcoming the special challenges faced by military units in the training and education of personnel.
	Medal "For Labour Valour" Медаль «За Трудовую Доблесть»	No. 166 - No. 727	2014-06-14 ---------- 2016-12-29	Awarded to employees of SpetsStroy of Russia with at least 10 years of experience in the Special Construction Service of Russia who were previously awarded departmental awards of SpetsStroy of Russia; can also be awarded in special circumstances to employees of other federal executive bodies, organizations subordinate to the federal executive authorities at the request of the heads of federal executive authorities, as well as to employees of other organizations at the request of the leaders of these organizations, for significant contributions to solving of problems in the field of special construction.
	Medal "For Impeccable Service" 1st Class Медаль «За безупречную службу» I степени	No. 52 - No. 727	2001-02-22 ---------- 2016-12-29	Awarded to soldiers of the Federal Agency for Special Construction of Russia for impeccable service over a period of 20 years. The reverse inscription reads «ЗА БЕЗУПРЕЧНУЮ СЛУЖБУ» (FOR FAULTLESS SERVICE).
	Medal "For Impeccable Service" 2nd Class Медаль «За безупречную службу» II степени	No. 52 - No. 727	2001-02-22 ---------- 2016-12-29	Awarded to soldiers of the Federal Agency for Special Construction of Russia for impeccable service over a period of 15 years. The reverse inscription reads «ЗА БЕЗУПРЕЧНУЮ СЛУЖБУ» (FOR FAULTLESS SERVICE).
	Medal "For Impeccablen Service" 3rd Class Медаль «За безупречную службу» III степени	No. 52 - No. 727	2001-02-22 ---------- 2016-12-29	Awarded to soldiers of the Federal Agency for Special Construction of Russia for impeccable service over a period of 10 years. The reverse inscription reads «ЗА БЕЗУПРЕЧНУЮ СЛУЖБУ» (FOR FAULTLESS SERVICE).
	Medal "50 Years of SpetsStroj of Russia" Медаль «50 лет Спецстроя России»	No. 174 - No. 727	2000-10-27 ---------- 2016-12-29	Awarded to military and civilian personnel who worked in the Federal Agency for Special Construction of Russia for 20 years or more, as well as to soldiers of other departments who made a significant contribution to the tasks entrusted to the agency as well as to other citizens who made a significant contribution to the tasks entrusted to the agency.
	Medal "55 Years of SpetsStroj of Russia" Медаль «55 лет Спецстроя России»	No. 421 - No. 727	2005-10-17 ---------- 2016-12-29	Awarded to soldiers of the central administration of engineering forces, of military road construction formations with 15 years or more of faultless service; veterans of the service with 20 years or more; civilian staff members who worked for 30 years or more in the service; soldiers and citizens who have made significant contributions to the tasks entrusted to the Federal Agency for Special Construction of Russia.
	Medal "60 Years of SpetsStroj of Russia" Медаль «60 лет Спецстроя России»	No. ? - No. 727	2010-10 ---------- 2016-12-29	Awarded to military personnel who have served perfectly in the central office or in military units of the Federal Agency for Special Construction for at least 15 years; to soldiers who are in the reserve (retired), retired from the central administration or from military units of the Federal Agency for Special Construction, who impeccably served in the system of Spetsstroj of Russia for at least 20 years; to members of the civilian staff who worked perfectly in the system of Spetsstroj of Russia for at least 20 years; to soldiers and citizens who have made a significant contribution to the solutions of the tasks entrusted to Spetsstroj of Russia.
	Medal "65 Years of SpetsStroj of Russia" Медаль «65 лет Спецстроя России»	No. 49 - No. 727	2016-02-24 ---------- 2016-12-29	Awarded to employees who have worked flawlessly (during military service) in the system of the Federal Agency for Special Construction of Russia for 20 years or more, may also be awarded to citizens who have made a significant contribution to solving the tasks assigned to the Federal Agency for Special Construction of Russia.
	Medal "40 Years of the MTU of SpetsStroj of Russia" Медаль «40 лет ВТУ при Спецстрое России»	No. 191 - No. 727	2007-04-19 ---------- 2016-12-29	Awarded to military personnel and veterans who worked in the Military-Technical University of the Federal Agency for Special Construction of Russia for 10 years or more; to members of the civilian staff for 15 years or more; to soldiers and civilians who have made a significant personal contribution to the development of the Military Technical University and to the tasks entrusted to it.
	Medal "65 Years of VEVUS" Медаль «65 лет ВЭВУС при Спецстрое России»	No. 192 - No. 727	2007-04-19 ---------- 2016-12-29	Awarded to military and civilian personnel as well as to veterans who worked in the Federal Agency for Special Construction of Russia on VEVUS, the Military Operational Communications Recovery System, for 15 years or more; to soldiers and civilians who have made a significant personal contribution to the development of VEVUS. Reverse inscription: ВОЕННОЕ ЭКСПЛУАТАЦИОННО-ВОССТАНОВИТЕЛЬНОЕ УПРАВЛЕНИЕ СВЯЗИ (MILITARY OPERATIONAL RECOVERY OF COMMUNICATIONS).

=== Badges ===
Award	Name (English/Russian)	Ministerial Order	Inception Date	Award Criteria
	Commemorative Badge "Chief of the Federal Agency for Special Construction of the Russian Federation" Памятный Знак «Начальника Федеральной Службы Специального Правительства Российской Федерации»	No. 169 - No. 727	2000-11-21 ---------- 2016-12-29	Awarded to employees of the Federal Service for Special Construction of the Russian Federation, of the military central administration, of military engineering and road-building units in military formations of SpetsStroj and others have made a significant contribution to solving the challenges facing the service.
Type 1 Type 2	Badge "Veteran of the Federal Agency for Special Construction" Знак «Ветеран Спецстроя России»	No. 7/237/8-2 - No. 727	2000-03-10 ---------- 2016-12-29	Awarded to employees who have 20 years of continuous service in Spetsstroy, 25 for women, as well as to military personnel who have at least 20 years of military service, including at least 15 years in Spetsstroy of Russia. Type 1 is at left, the current type 2 is at right.
Type 1 Type 2	Badge "Excellent Special Construction Troops of Russia" Знак «Отличник Спецстроя России»	No. 7/237/8-3 - No. 727	2000-03-10 ---------- 2016-12-29	Awarded to meritorious male employees of SpetsStroj with more than 10 years, female employees with more than 15 years of seniority in the department, as well as military personnel with 5 years or more of service, of which at least three have been with SpetsStroj.
Prototype	Badge "Excellent Special Construction Troops of Russia" Знак «Отличник Спецстроя России»	No. 7/237/8-3 - No. 727	2000-03-10 ---------- 2016-12-29	Awarded to meritorious male employees of SpetsStroj with more than 10 years, female employees with more than 15 years of seniority in the department, as well as military personnel with 5 years or more of service, of which at least three have been with SpetsStroj.

== Federal Agency for the Safe Storage and Destruction of Chemical Weapons ==
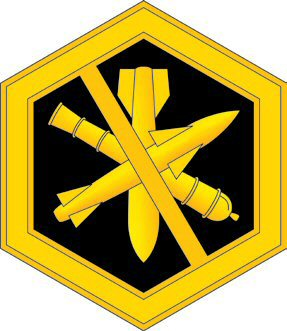

The Federal Agency for the Safe Storage and Destruction of Chemical Weapons was subordinate to the Ministry of Defence.

=== Medals ===
Award	Name (English/Russian)	Ministerial Order	Inception Date	Award Criteria
75px.center	Decoration "For outstanding achievements and contribution to the field of chemical disarmament" Почетный знак «За выдающиеся заслуги и личный вклад в области химического разоружения»	No. ?	2007-08-10	The complete establishment order as not yet been found for translation to this article and is possibly not published to date.
75px.center	Decoration "For the successful completion of the destruction of poisonous substances in a facility" Знак отличия «За успешное завершение уничтожения отравляющих веществ на объекте»	No. 190	2015-09-10	Departmental Order was identified but not yet found in its entirety for translation to this article. It is possibly unpublished to date.
75px.center	Medal "For Active Participation in Chemical Disarmament" Медаль «За активное участие в уничтожении химического оружия»	No. 250	2009-09-01	Departmental Order was identified but not yet found in its entirety for translation to this article. It is possibly unpublished to date.
75px.center	Medal "For Contributions to Chemical Disarmament" Медаль «За вклад в химическое разоружение»	No. 250	2009-09-01	Departmental Order was identified but not yet found in its entirety for translation to this article. It is possibly unpublished to date.
75px.center	Medal "For Cooperation in the Field of Chemical Disarmament" Медаль «За содружество в области химического разоружения»	No. 319	2007-10-15	Departmental Order was identified but not yet found in its entirety for translation to this article. It is possibly unpublished to date.
75px.center	Medal "Veteran of Chemical Disarmament" Медаль «Ветеран химического разоружения»	No. 50	2012-03-23	Departmental Order was identified but not yet found in its entirety for translation to this article. It is possibly unpublished to date.
75px.center	Jubilee Medal "15 Years of the Federal Agency for the Safe Storage and Destruction of Chemical Weapons" Юбилейной Медаль «15 лет федеральное управление по безопасному хранению и уничтожению химического оружия»	No. 319	2007-10-15	Departmental Order was identified but not yet found in its entirety for translation to this article. It is possibly unpublished to date.
75px.center	Jubilee Medal "20 Years of the Federal Agency for the Safe Storage and Destruction of Chemical Weapons" Юбилейной Медаль «20 лет федеральное управление по безопасному хранению и уничтожению химического оружия»	No. 50	2012-03-23	Departmental Order was identified but not yet found in its entirety for translation to this article. It is possibly unpublished to date.
75px.center	Jubilee Medal "25 Years of the Federal Agency for the Safe Storage and Destruction of Chemical Weapons" Юбилейная медаль «25 лет федеральное управление по безопасному хранению и уничтожению химического оружия»	No. 111	2017-05-10	Departmental Order was identified but not yet found in its entirety for translation to this article. It is possibly unpublished to date.
75px.center	Jubilee Medal "15 Years of the Research Center of the Federal Administration for the Safe Storage and Destruction of Chemical Weapons" Юбилейной Медаль «15 лет научно-исследовательскому центру федерального управления по безопасному хранению и уничтожению химического оружия»	No. ?	2016	Departmental Order was identified but not yet found in its entirety for translation to this article. It is possibly unpublished to date.

=== Decorations ===
Award	Name (English/Russian)	Ministerial Order	Inception Date	Award Criteria
	Decoration "For Merit in the Destruction of Chemical Weapons" Знак отличия «За заслуги в уничтожении химического оружия»	No. 131	2004-07-24	The complete establishment order as not yet been found for translation to this article and is possibly not published to date. Awarded in three grades.
	Decoration "For Valour in the Storage and Destruction of Chemical Weapons" Знак отличия «За доблесть при хранении и уничтожении химического оружия»	No. 310	2006-08-04	Awarded to soldiers of the Federal Office for the Safe Storage and Destruction of Chemical Weapons, who had served there for at least 3 years, for exemplary performance of military duties and the successful completion of special assignments.
	Decoration "For Merit in the development of sport" Знак отличия «За заслуги в развитии спорта»	No. 80	2014-04-18	The complete establishment order as not yet been found for translation to this article and is possibly not published to date.

== Emblems of Defence Ministry entities ==
Branch/department	Emblem	Branch/department	Emblem
Ministry of Defence; Министерство обороны		Armed Forces; Вооружённые Силы	
General Staff; Генеральный Штаб		Army; Сухопутные войска	
Navy; Военно-морской флот		Aerospace Force; Воздушно-космических сил	
Airborne Troops; Воздушно-десантные войска		Strategic Rocket Forces; Ракетные войска стратегического назначения	
Air Defense; Противовоздушная оборона сухопутных войск		Environmental Service of the Armed Forces; Экологическая служба Вооруженных Сил	
Rocket and Artillery Troops; Ракетные войска и артиллерия		Signal Corps; Войска связи	
Special Purpose Units; Спецназ ГРУ Генерального штаба		Corps of Engineers; Инженерные войска	
Military Nuclear Security Units; Воинские части ядерного обеспечения		Railway Troops; Железнодорожные войска	
Rear of the Armed Forces - Logistics; Служба тыла Вооруженных Сил		Quartering and Settlement; Служба расквартирования и обустройства	
Federal Agency for Special Construction; Федеральное агентство специального строительства		Nuclear, Chemical and Biological troops Войска радиационной, химической и биологической защиты	
Federal Service for Technical and Export Control; Федеральная служба по техническому и экспортному контролю		Federal Service for Defence Contracts; Федеральная служба по оборонному заказу	
Federal Service for Military-Technical Cooperation; Федеральная служба по военно-техническому сотрудничеству		Federal Agency for Safe Storage and Destruction of Chemical Weapons; Федеральное управление по безопасному хранению и уничтожению химического оружия	

== See also ==
- Awards and decorations of the Russian Federation
- Ministerial Awards of the Russian Federation
- List of awards of independent services of the Russian Federation
- Awards of the Ministry for Emergency Situations of Russia
- Awards of the Ministry of Internal Affairs of Russia
- Awards of the Federal Security Service of the Russian Federation
- Awards of the Federal Protective Service of the Russian Federation
- Honorary titles of the Russian Federation
- Awards and decorations of the Soviet Union
- Ministry of Defence (Russia)
- Russian Armed Forces
- Russian Ground Forces
- Russian Navy
- Russian Air Force
- Russian Airborne Troops
- Strategic Rocket Forces
- Russian Space Forces
- Russian Railway Troops
- Internal Troops
- Internal Troops (Russia)
- Military history of the Russian Federation
