= BMK =

BMK may refer to:

- Baja Mali Knindža, Bosnian Serb turbofolk singer
- Barbie Mini Kingdom, a doll line
- Big Mama King, a Korean singer
- Bulaimu Muwanga Kibirige, a Ugandan businessman
- M. Balamuralikrishna, a Carnatic musician
- Benzyl methyl ketone, synonymous of phenylacetone
- Brian Kibler, full name Brian McCormick Kibler
- Bare metal kernel, an operating system capable running natively on some hardware
- Beloretskiy Metallurgicheskiy Kombinat, a steel company in Russia

bmk may refer to:

- Ghayavi language (ISO 639-3 code), a language of Papua New Guinea
