= Declaration of State Sovereignty of Bashkortostan =

Declaration of State Sovereignty of Bashkortostan Bashkir: Башҡортостандың Дәүләт Суверенитеты тураһында Декларация, Başqortostandıñ Däwlät Suverenitetı turahında Deklaratsiya
- Created: 11 October 1990
- Ratified: 11 October 1990
- Location: Russian SFSR, Bashkir ASSR, Ufa
- Purpose: Declaration of sovereignty

Declaration of State Sovereignty of Bashkortostan was a document declaring the political and economic autonomy of the Bashkir Autonomous Soviet Socialist Republic from the Soviet Union. The Declaration was adopted on 11 October 1990 at the third session of the Supreme Soviet of the Bashkir ASSR. The former Bashkir ASSR is today the Republic of Bashkortostan, a federal subject of Russia. The declaration of Bashkortostan’s sovereignty was effectively rescinded following the decision of the Constitutional Court of the Russian Federation in June 2009 to strike out all language mentioning regional sovereignty from regional constitutions and laws as contradictory to the Constitution of the Russian Federation.

== Declaration ==
On 12 June 1990 the Congress of People's Deputies of the RSFSR adopted the Declaration of State Sovereignty of the Russian Soviet Federative Socialist Republic. This Declaration, as well as laws of the USSR "On the division of powers between the USSR and the subjects of the Federation", "On the basis of economic relations of the USSR and the Union and autonomous republics" were the legal basis for the development and adoption of the Declaration of State Sovereignty of the Bashkir Republic.

With the launch of the Supreme Council BASSR, which started the drafting of the Declaration of State Sovereignty of the Bashkir SSR in the country, a discussion about the place of Bashkortostan in the Soviet Union and the Russian Federation began. During the development of the Declaration there were designated two centres – in the Supreme Soviet Bashkir ASSR Council of Ministers and the Bashkir ASSR. At the end of July 1990 were developed two draft Declaration that August 2, 1990 were sent to USSR People's Deputies of the RSFSR and BASSR for study and their proposals.

On 10 August 1990 several projects have been published on the Declaration pages by national newspapers for public discussion, among which was a draft prepared by scholars L. Sh. Gumerova, Z. I. Enikeew, A. N. Timonin and F. Z. Yusupov.

On 11 October 1990 at the third session of the Supreme Soviet of the Bashkir ASSR, they adopted of the Declaration of State Sovereignty of the Republic.

Murtaza Rakhimov described the adoption of the Bashkortostan Declaration of Sovereignty as "In the name of great aims", "we may say that the Bashkort people is undergoing its second birth. The development of the national culture, growing interest in the native language, of the old traditions — all this gives hope that the Bashkorts will not lose its national originality. It is necessary to point out that further all-round development of the Bashkort people will be possible only if other peoples of Bashkortostan go through the same process of development, will use their native languages, enjoy their morality, history and culture."

== Republic Day ==
Bashkortostan celebrates 11 October as Republic Day, a national holiday – the Day of the Declaration on State Sovereignty of the Republic. The holiday was enacted by the Supreme Council of the Republic of Bashkortostan on 27 February 1992. Along with other national holidays like Eid al-Fitr, Eid al-Adha and the Day of the Constitution of Bashkortostan, the Republic Day is a non-working holiday.

== See also ==
- Dissolution of the USSR
- Constitution of the Republic of Bashkortostan
- Russian constitutional crisis of 1993
