= Bashkortostan =

First-level administrative division of Russia

Republic of Bashkortostan Республика Башкортостан (Russian)
- Republic

Other transcription(s)
  - Bashkir: Башҡортостан Республикаһы
  - Romanization: Başqortostan Respublikahı
- Flag Coat of arms
- Anthem: State Anthem of the Republic of Bashkortostan
- Interactive map of Republic of Bashkortostan
- Location within European Russia
- Coordinates: 54°43′00″N 55°56′30″E
- Country: Russia
- Federal district: Volga
- Economic region: Ural
- Capital: Ufa

Government
  - Body: State Assembly-Kurultay
  - Head: Radiy Khabirov
  - Prime Minister: Andrei Nazarov
  - Members of the State Duma: List of Deputies: Pavel Kachkayev; Rafael Mardanshin; Elvira Aitkulova; Rifat Shaykhutdinov; Zarif Baiguskarov; Dinar Gilmutdinov
  - Senators: Lilia Gumerova; Oleg Golov

Area
  - Total: 142,947 km^{2} (55,192 sq mi)

Population (2021 Census)
  - Total: ▲4,091,423: 36.89% Russians; 31.01% Bashkirs; 23.82% Volga Tatars; 2.10% Mari; 2.08% Chuvash; 0.42% Udmurts; 0.36% Ukrainians
  - Estimate (2018): 4,063,293
  - Rank: 7th
  - Density: 28.62/km^{2} (74.1/sq mi)
  - Urban: 59.1%
  - Rural: 40.9%

GDP (nominal, 2024)
  - Total: ₽3 trillion (US$35.18 billion)
  - Per capita: ₽739,699 (US$8,679.77)
- Time zone: UTC+5 (MSK+2)
- ISO 3166 code: RU-BA
- License plates: 02, 102, 702
- OKTMO ID: 80000000
- Official languages: Russian; Bashkir
- Website: bashkortostan.ru

Bashkortostan, (Note: UK: /bæʃˈkɔːrtəstɑːn/ bash-KOR-tə-stahn, US: /bɑːʃˈ-/ bahsh-; Bashkir: Башҡортостан, romanized: Bashqortostan; Russian: Башкортостан, romanized: Bashkortostan, IPA: [bəʂkərtɐˈstan].) officially the Republic of Bashkortostan, (Note: Bashkir: Башҡортостан Республикаһы, romanized: Bashqortostan Respublikahy; Russian: Республика Башкортостан, romanized: Respublika Bashkortostan, IPA: [rʲɪsˈpublʲɪkə bəʂkərtɐˈstan].) sometimes also called Bashkiria, (Note: Russian: Башкирия, romanized: Bashkiriya, IPA: [bɐʂˈkʲirʲɪjə].) is a republic of Russia between the Volga river and the Ural Mountains in Eastern Europe. The republic borders Perm Krai to the north, Sverdlovsk Oblast to the northeast, Chelyabinsk Oblast to the east, Orenburg Oblast to the south, Tatarstan to the west and Udmurtia to the northwest. It covers 143,600 square kilometres (55,400 square miles). It is the seventh-most populous federal subject in Russia and the most populous republic. As of 2025, it has a population of 4,046,094. Its capital and largest city is Ufa. Other major cities include Sterlitamak, Salavat, Neftekamsk, and Oktyabrsky.

Bashkortostan was established on 28 November [O.S. 15 November] 1917. On 20 March 1919, it was transformed into the Bashkir ASSR, the first autonomous republic in the Russian SFSR. On 11 October 1990, it adopted the Declaration of State Sovereignty. In the Constitution of Bashkortostan and Constitution of Russia, Bashkortostan is defined as a state.

== Name ==
The name Bashkortostan derives from the name of the Bashkir ethnic group, and is literally translated as "land of the Bashkirs". While the endonym having various theories on its meaning, the most prominent being a combination of Turkic words baş, meaning 'head', 'chief', 'main', 'principal' and qurt meaning 'wolf' (one of the animals regarded as sacred to Turkic peoples); the suffix -stan is Persian, commonly used for many Eurasian territorial names.

The Russian name Bashkiriya first appeared at the end of the 16th century. Originally, it appeared in the forms Bashkir land, Bashkir, Bashkirda and Bashkir horde.

== History ==
=== Early history ===
The first settlements in the territory of modern Bashkortostan date from the early Paleolithic period, but the Bronze Age spurred an upsurge in the population of this territory. When people of the Abashevo culture started settling here, they possessed high skills in manufacturing bronze tools, weapons and decorations. They were the first to establish permanent settlements in the Southern Urals.

In the 10th century, Al-Balkhi wrote about Bashkirs as a people, divided into two groups, one of which inhabited the Southern Urals, while the other lived near the Danube River, close to the boundaries of Byzantium. His contemporary Ibn-Ruste described the Bashkirs as "an independent people, occupying territories on both sides of the Ural mountain ridge between Volga, Kama, Tobol and upstream of Yaik River".

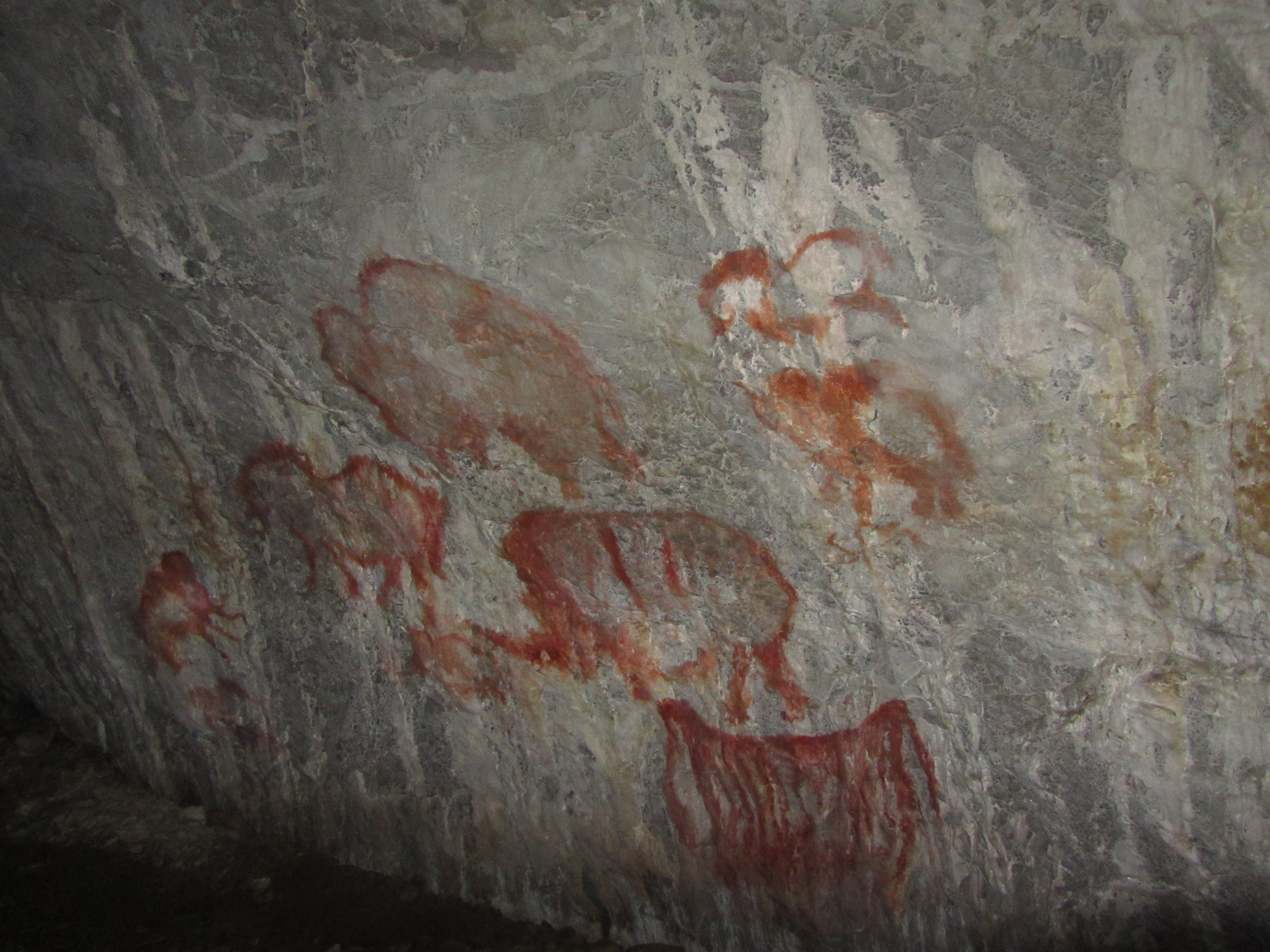
Cave paintings in the Shulgan-Tash Nature Reserve.

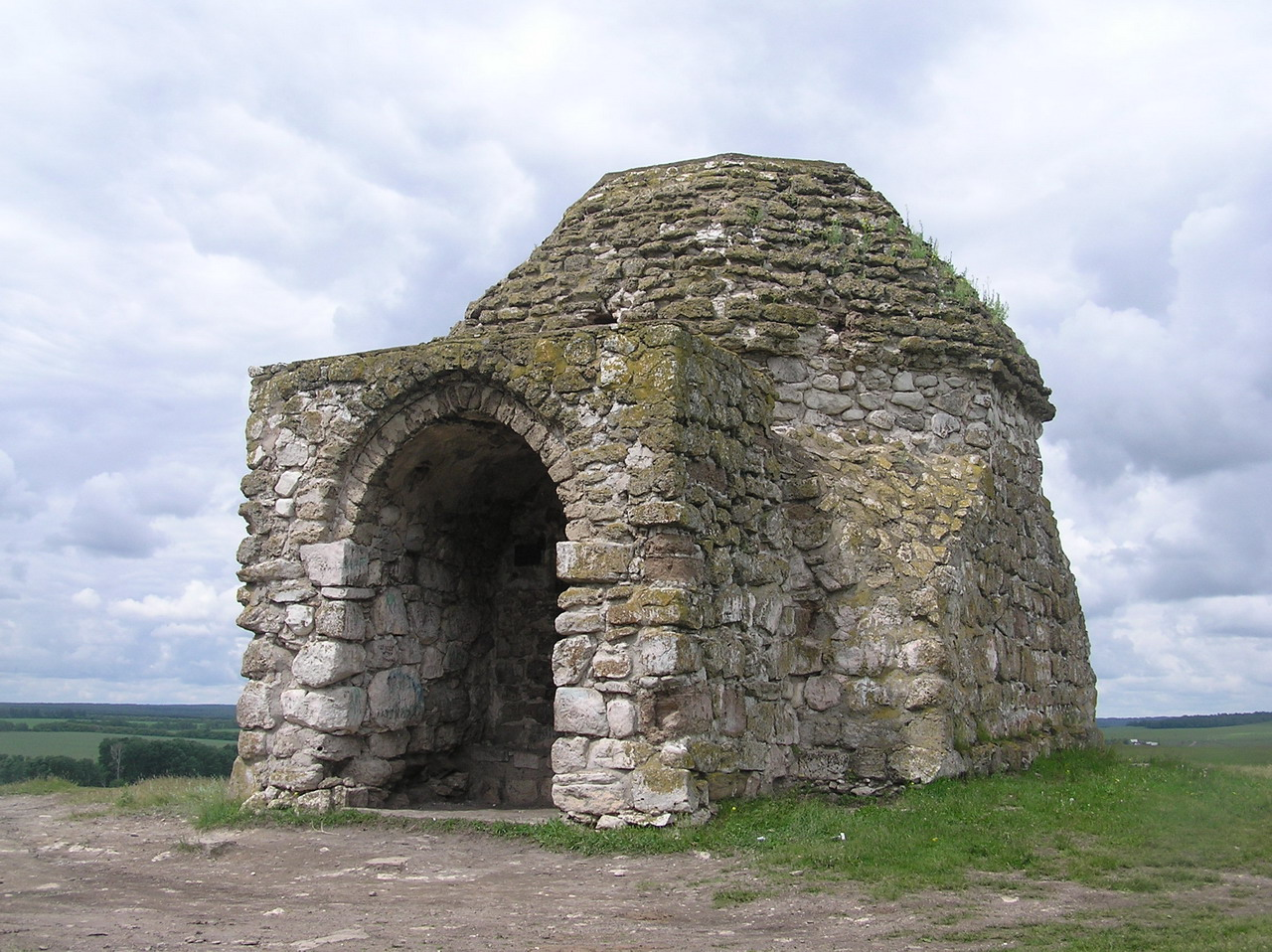
Mausoleum of Turahan, 14th-century building.

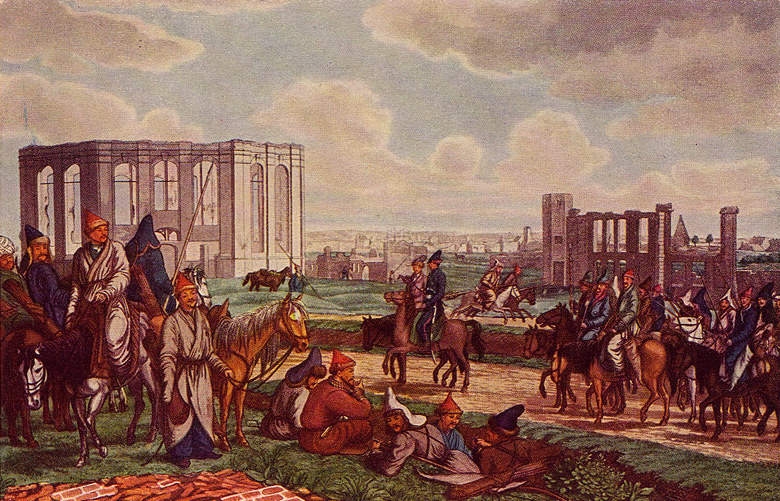
Bashkirs near Hamburg during the Napoleonic Wars, c. 1813.

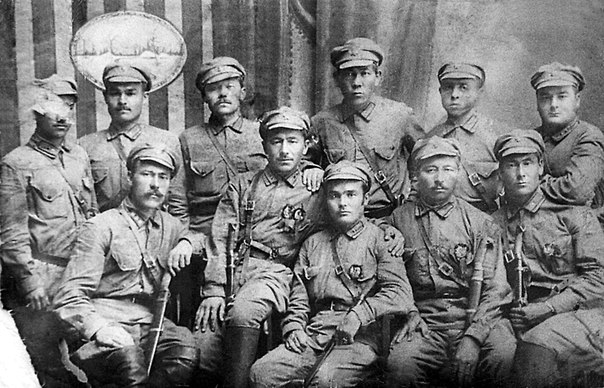
A Red Army cavalry unit made up of Bashkirs, likely taken between 1924 and 1927.

After the early-feudal Mongolian state had broken down in the 14th century, the territory of modern Bashkortostan became divided between the Kazan, the Siberia Khanates and the Nogai Horde. The tribes that lived there were headed by bi (tribal heads).

=== Within the Russian Tsardom and Empire ===
After Kazan fell to Ivan the Terrible in 1554–1555, representatives of western and northwestern Bashkir tribes approached the Tsar with a request to voluntarily join Muscovy. The Bashkir rebellion of 1662–1664 and the Bashkir rebellion of 1704–1711 were primarily caused by the Russian government's violations of the terms and conditions previously agreed between the Bashkirs and the Russian authorities. Bashkirs were also largely involved in the Pugachev Rebellion (their leader Salawat Yulayev, currently considered a national hero of the Bashkirs, was one of Pugachev's closest aides).

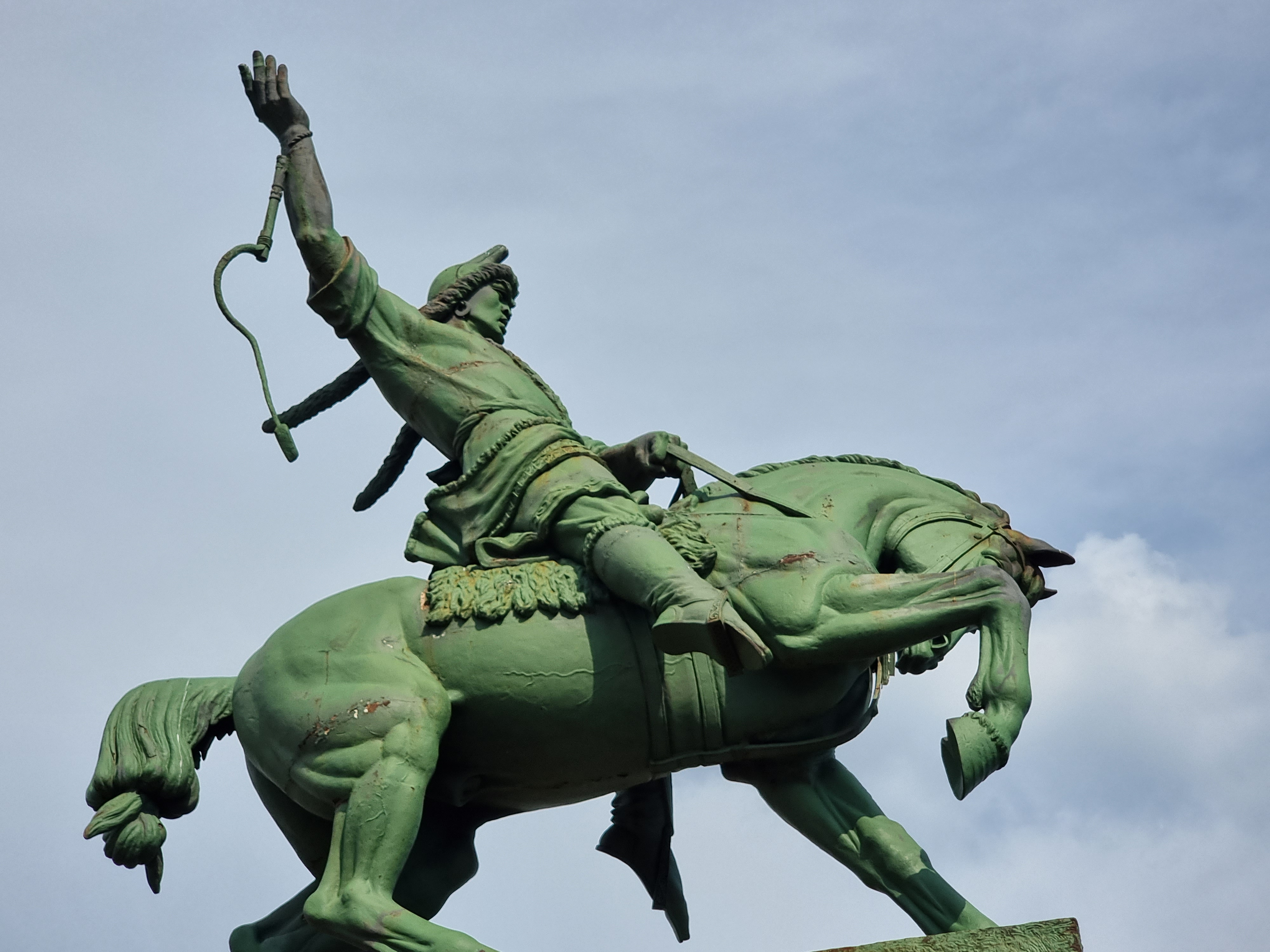
The monument for the national hero of Bashkortostan, Salawat Yulayev, who led a rebellion against the Russian Empire.

Starting from the second half of the 16th century, Bashkiria's territory began taking shape as a part of the Russian state. In 1798, the Spiritual Assembly of Russian Muslims was established, an indication that the tsarist government recognized the rights of Bashkirs, Tatars, and other Muslim nations to profess Islam and perform religious rituals. Ufa Governorate (guberniya), with a center in Ufa, was formed in 1865—another step toward territorial identification.

=== After the Russian Revolution of 1917 ===
After the Russian Revolution of 1917 were the All-Bashkir Qoroltays (conventions), which required a decision on the need to create a national federal republic within Russia. As a result, on 28 November 1917, the Bashkir Regional (Central) Shuro (Council) proclaimed the establishment of territorial and national autonomy in areas of Orenburg, Perm, Samara, and Ufa provinces with a predominantly Bashkir population.

In December 1917, delegates to the All-Bashkir (constituent) Congress, representing the interests of the population edge of all nationalities, voted unanimously for the resolution (Farman #2) of the Bashkir regional Shuro for the proclamation of national-territorial autonomy (of the Republic) Bashkurdistan. The congress formed the government of Bashkurdistan, the Pre-parliament—Kese-Qoroltay and other bodies of power and administration, and decisions were made on how to proceed.

In March 1919, based on the agreements of the Russian Government, the Bashkir Autonomous Soviet Socialist Republic was formed. During the Soviet period, Bashkiria was granted broad autonomous rights, the first among other Russian regions. The administrative structure of the Bashkir ASSR was based on principles similar to those of other autonomous republics of Russia.

=== Dissolution of the Soviet Union ===
On 11 October 1990, the Supreme Soviet of the Republic adopted the declaration on state sovereignty of the Bashkir ASSR. On 25 February 1992, the Bashkir ASSR was renamed the Republic of Bashkortostan.

On 31 March 1992, a Federative Compact "On separation of authorities and powers among federal organs of power of the Russian Federation and the organs of power of the Republic of Bashkortostan" was signed. On 3 August 1994, a Compact "On separation of authorities and mutual delegating of powers among the organs of power of the Russian Federation and the organs of power of the Republic of Bashkortostan" was signed, granting the republic autonomy. This agreement was unilaterally abolished on 7 July 2005.

== Geography ==
Bashkortostan contains part of the southern Urals and the adjacent plains.

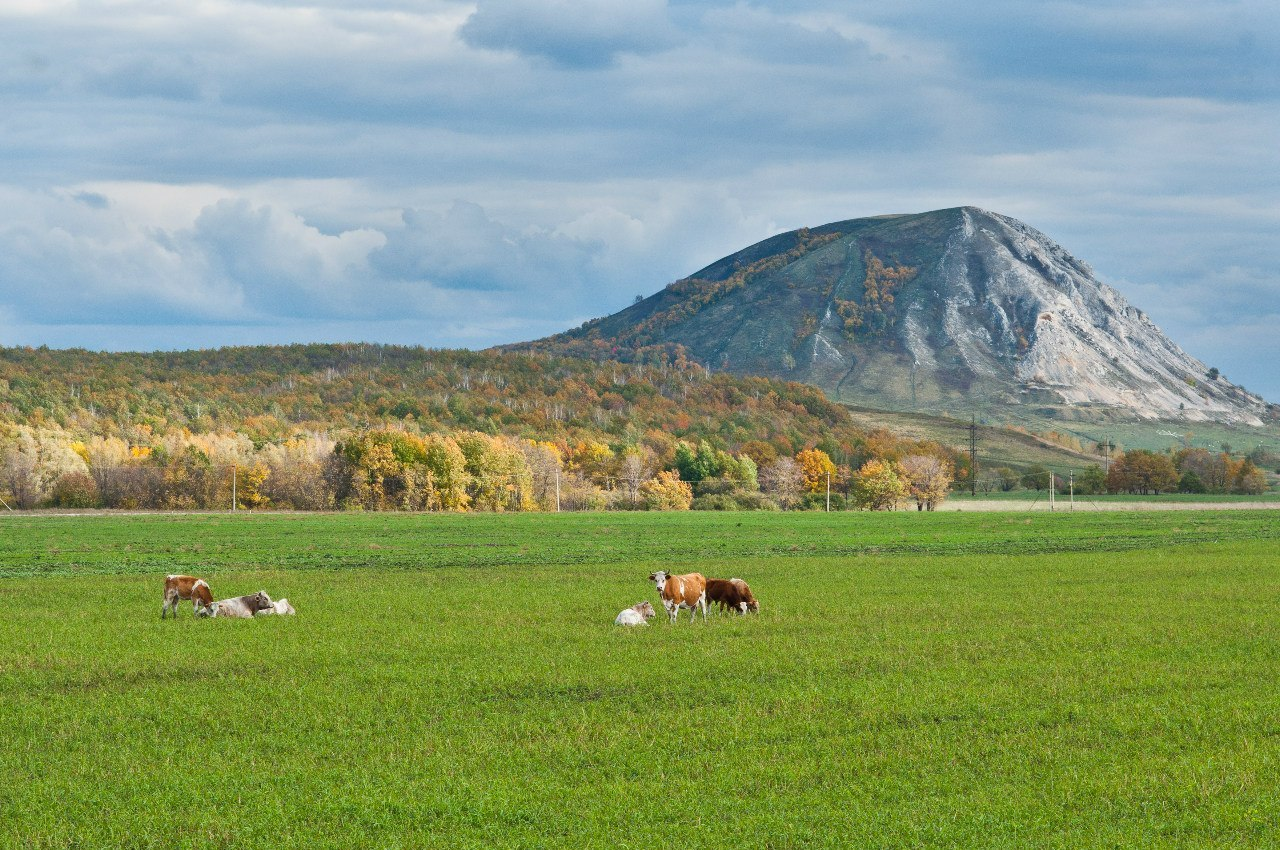
Shihan Toratau. Single hills are popular symbols of Bashkortostan.

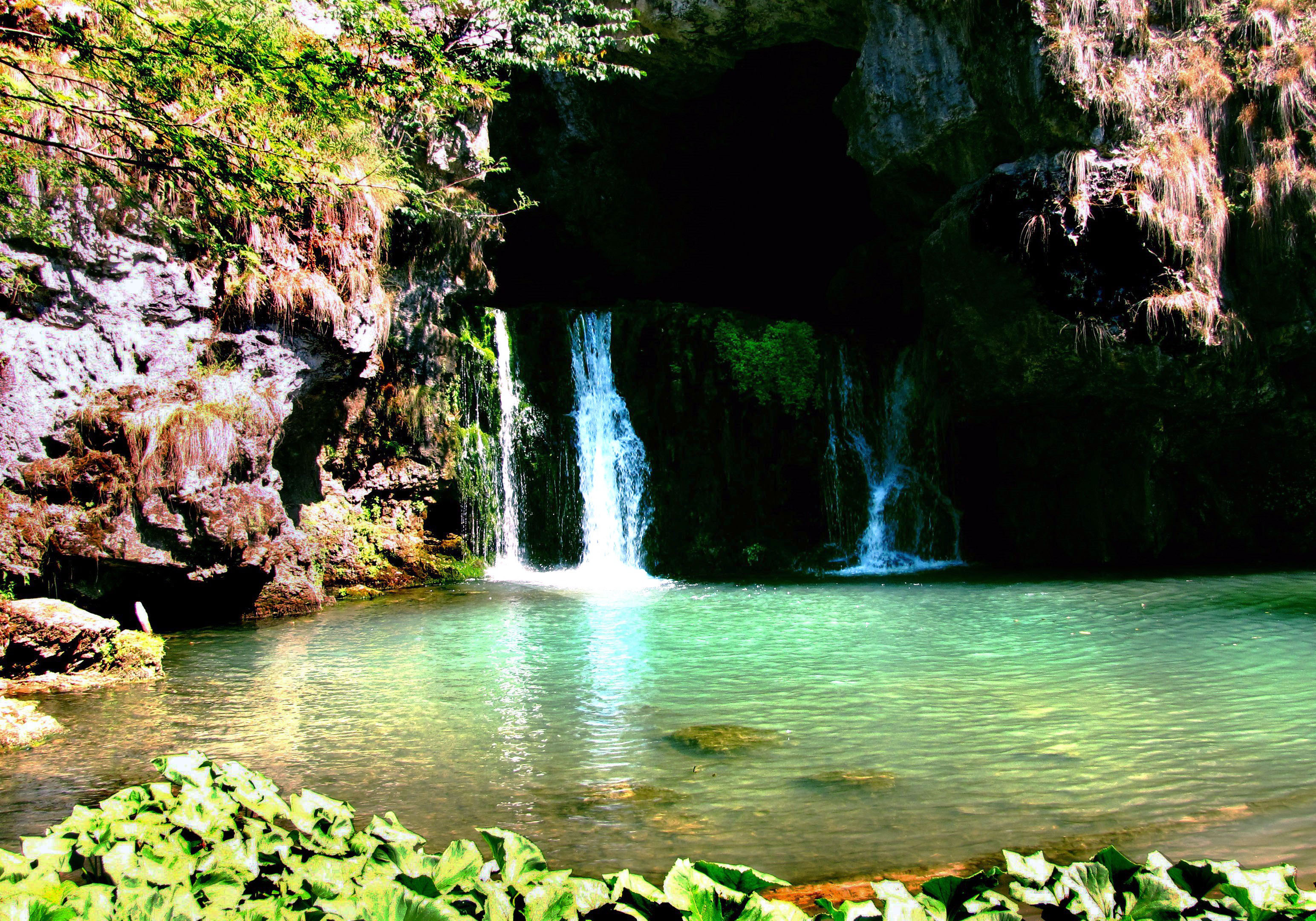
Atysh waterfall

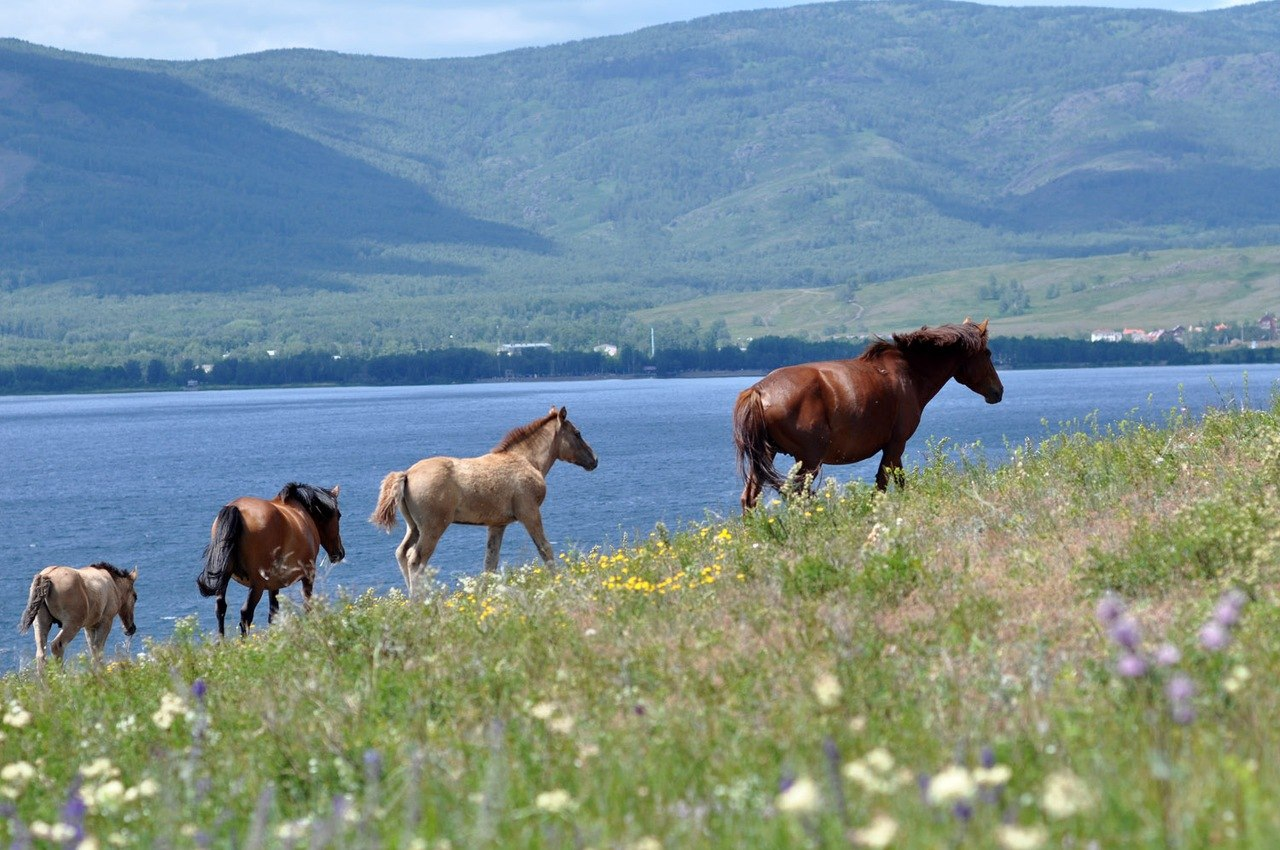
Bashkir horses near Yakty-Kul lake

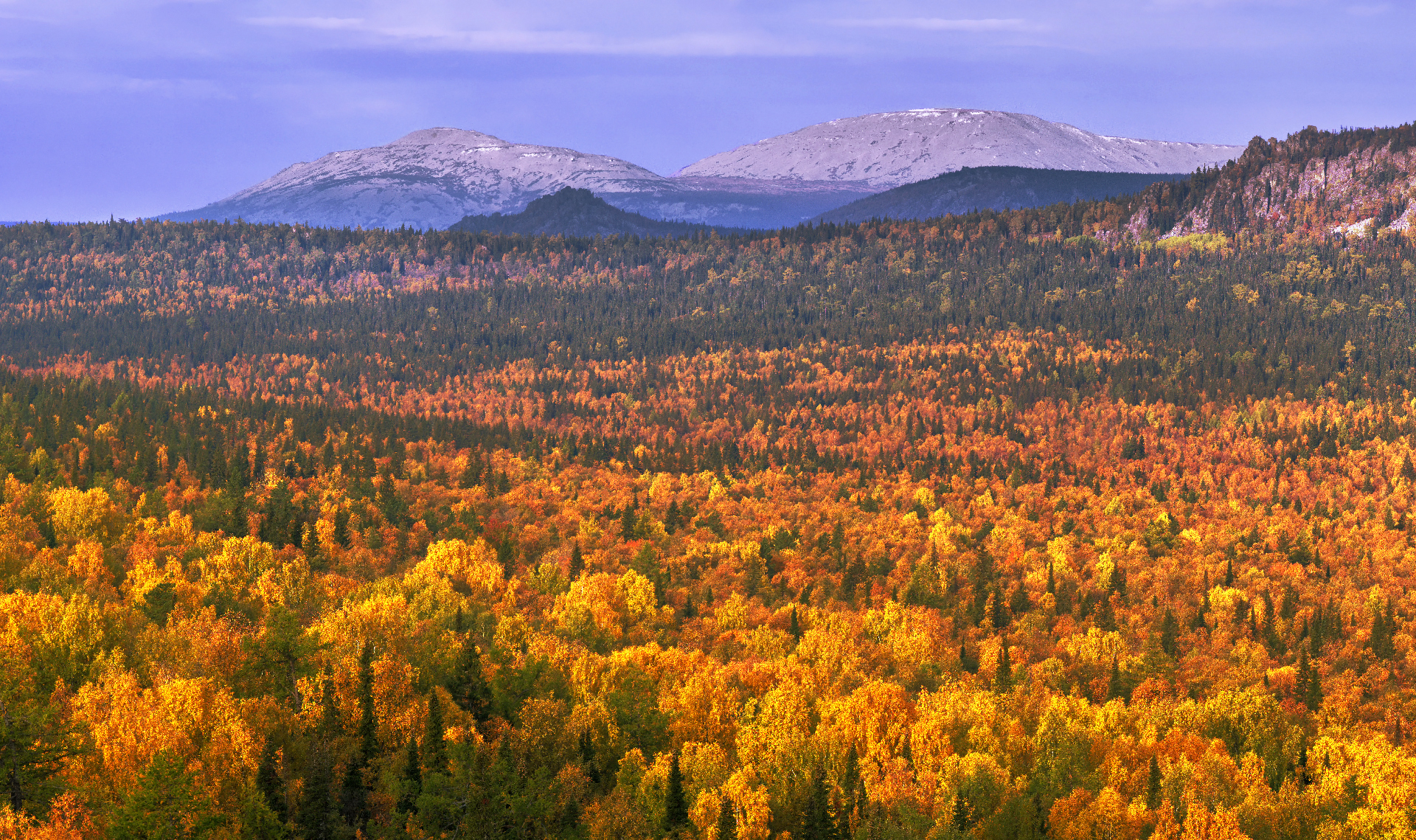
Autumn Yamantau
- Area: 143,600 square kilometers (55,400 sq mi) (according to the 2002 Census)
- Borders: Bashkortostan borders with Perm Krai (N), Sverdlovsk Oblast (NE), Chelyabinsk Oblast (NE/E/SE), Orenburg Oblast (SE/S/SW), the Republic of Tatarstan (W), and the Udmurt Republic (NW)
- Highest point: Mount Yamantau (1,638 m)
- Maximum north-south distance: 550 km
- Maximum east-west distance: over 430 km

=== Rivers ===
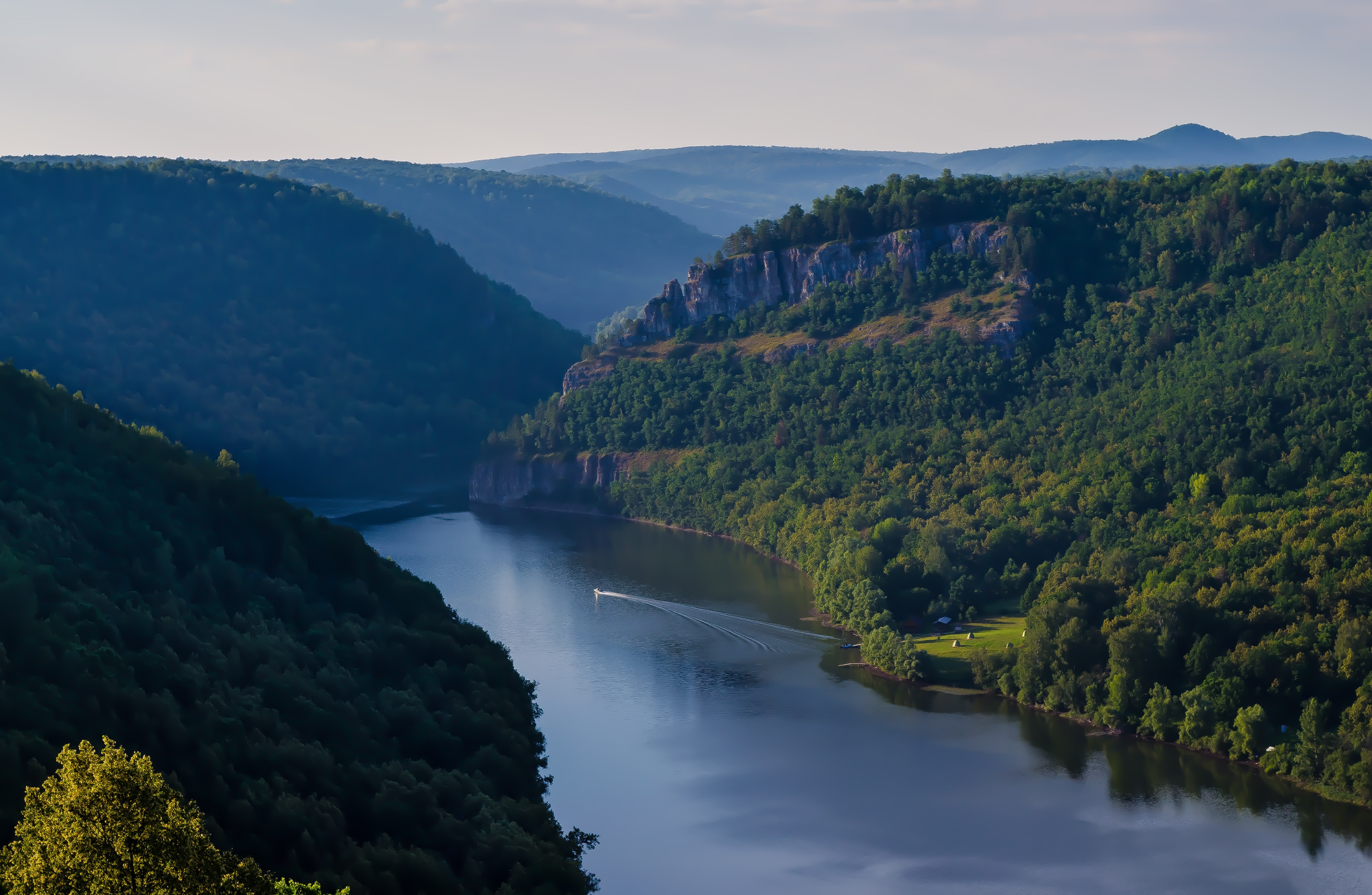
Nugush River

There are over 13,000 rivers in the republic. Many rivers are part of the deep-water transportation system of European Russia; they provide access to ports of the Baltic and Black seas.

Major rivers include:

- Belaya (Aghidhel) River (1,430 km)
- Ufa (Qaraidel) River (918 km)
- Sakmara River (760 km)
- Ik (Iq) River (571 km)
- Dyoma (Dim) River (556 km)
- Ay River (549 km)
- Yuruzan River (404 km)
- Bystry Tanyp River (345 km)
- Sim River (239 km)
- Nugush River (235 km)
- Tanalyk River (225 km)
- Zilim (Yethem) River (215 km)
- Syun River (209 km)

=== Lakes ===
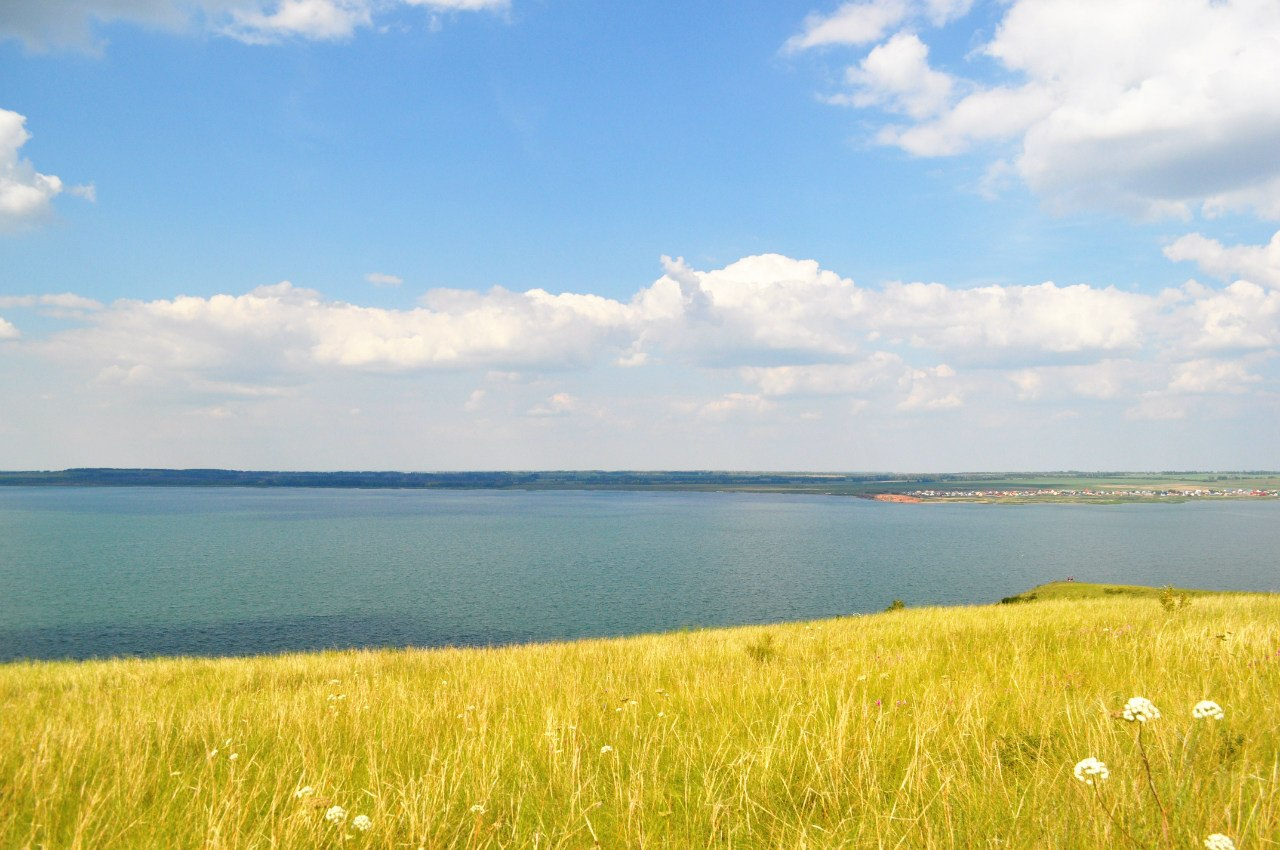
Lake Asylykül

There are 2,700 lakes and reservoirs in the republic.

=== Mountains ===
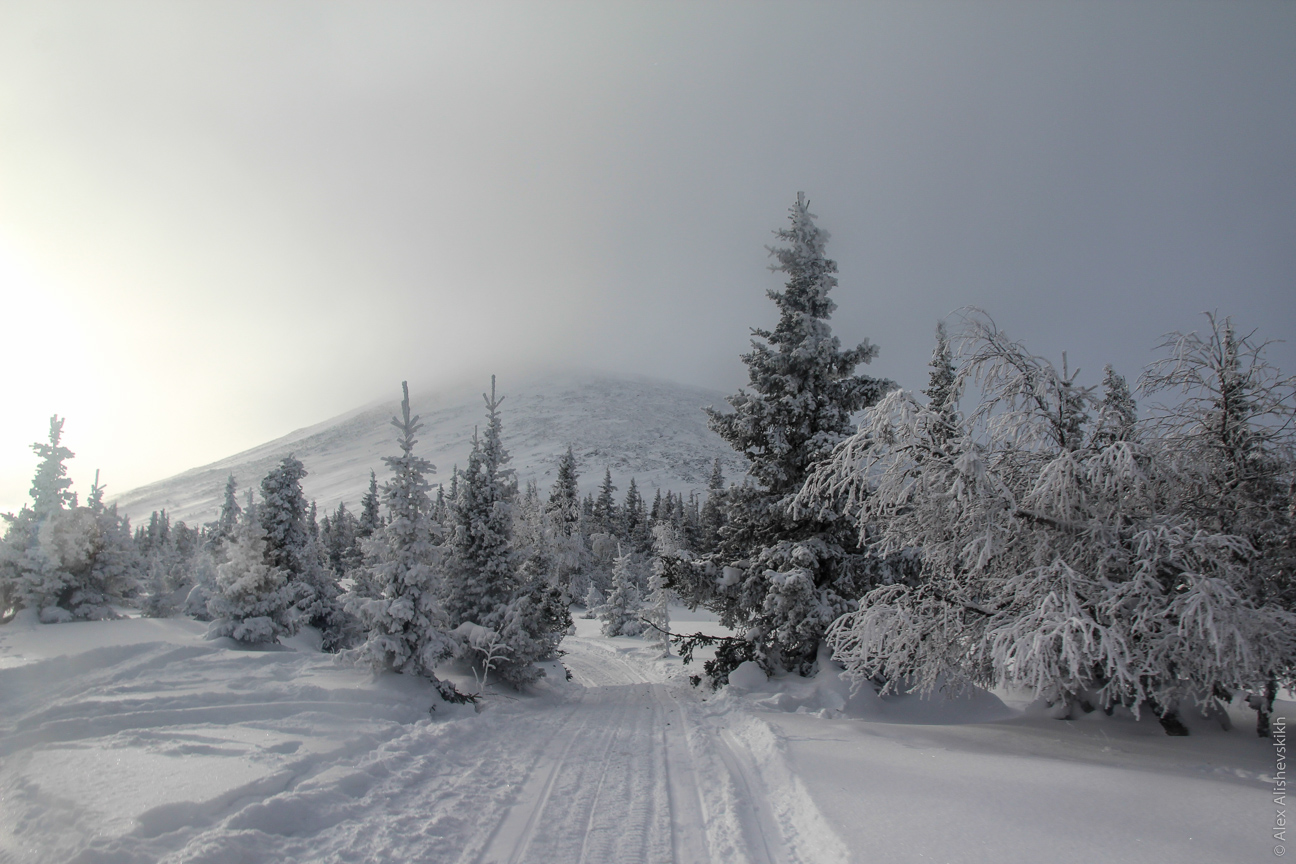
Iremel Mount

The Republic contains part of the southern Urals, which stretch from the northern to the southern border. It includes a number of mountain ranges.

The highest mountains include:

- Mount Yamantau (1,638 m)
- Mount Bolshoy Iremel (1,582 m)
- Mount Maly Iremel (1,449 m)

=== Natural resources ===
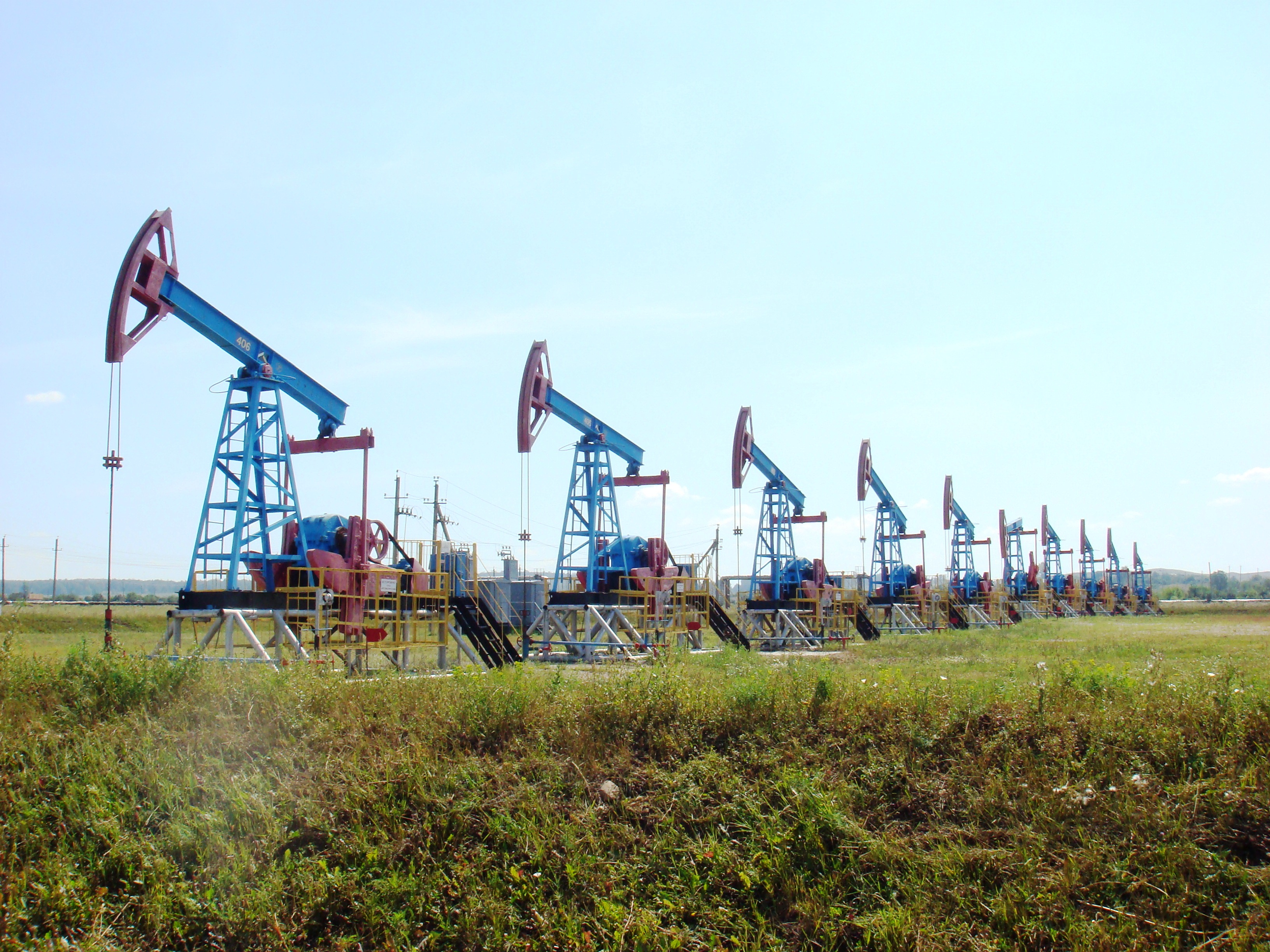
Bashneft oil pumps

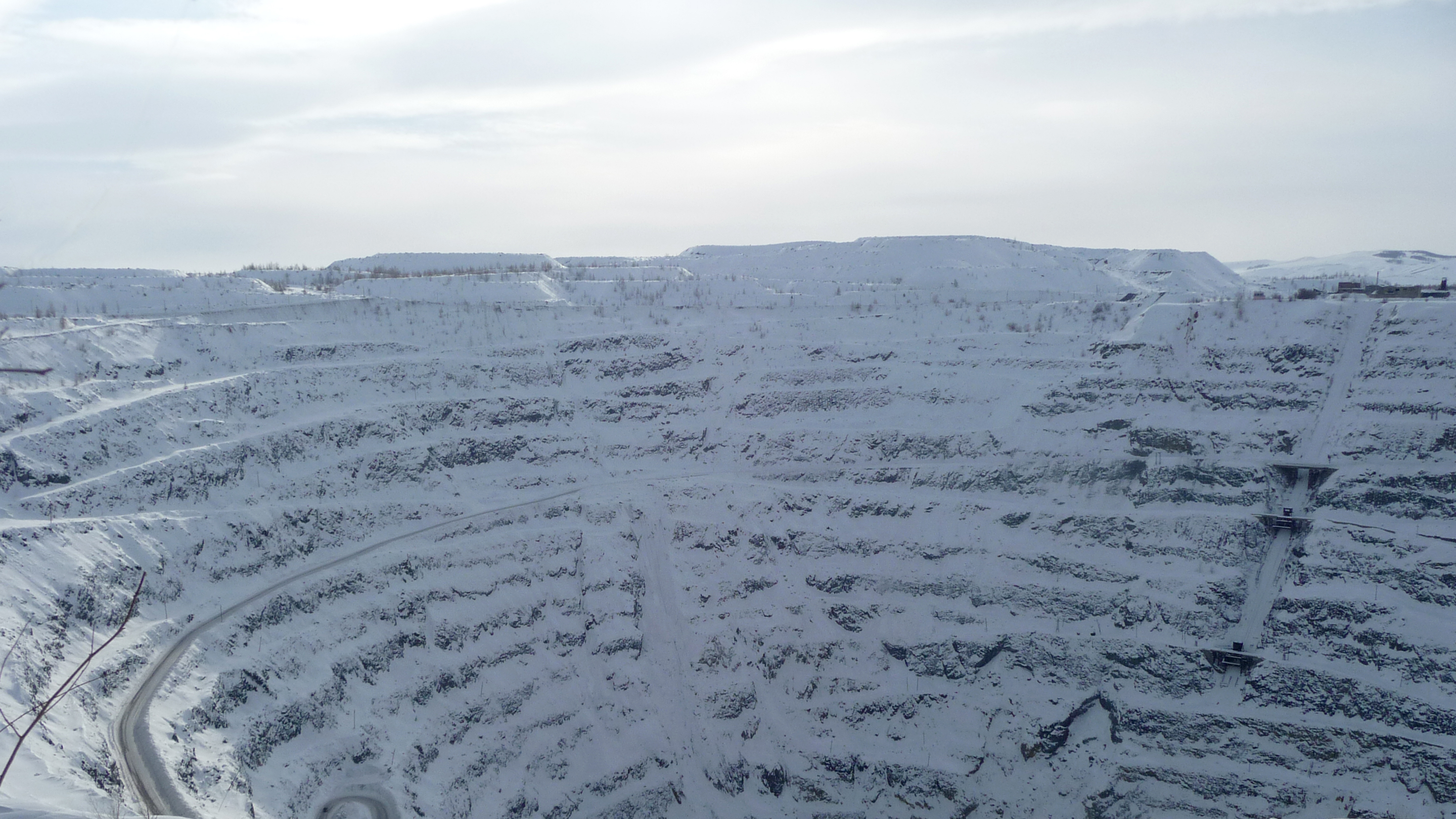
Quarry near Sibay

Major resources are oil reserves, natural gas, coal, ferrous metal ores, manganese, chromite, and more. Bashkortostan is a major source of materials used in non-ferrous metallurgy. The republic has considerablee deposits of lignite with a high degree of bitumen.

Over one-third of the territory of Bashkortostan, or 62,000 square kilometres (24,000 sq mi), is wooded. The following types of trees dominate: birch, conifers, lime, oak, and maple. Bashkortostan forests have special sanctuaries and national parks. They cover more than 10,000 square kilometres (3,900 sq mi).

The Asselian Age at the start of the Permian period of geological time is named after the Assel River in Bashkortostan.

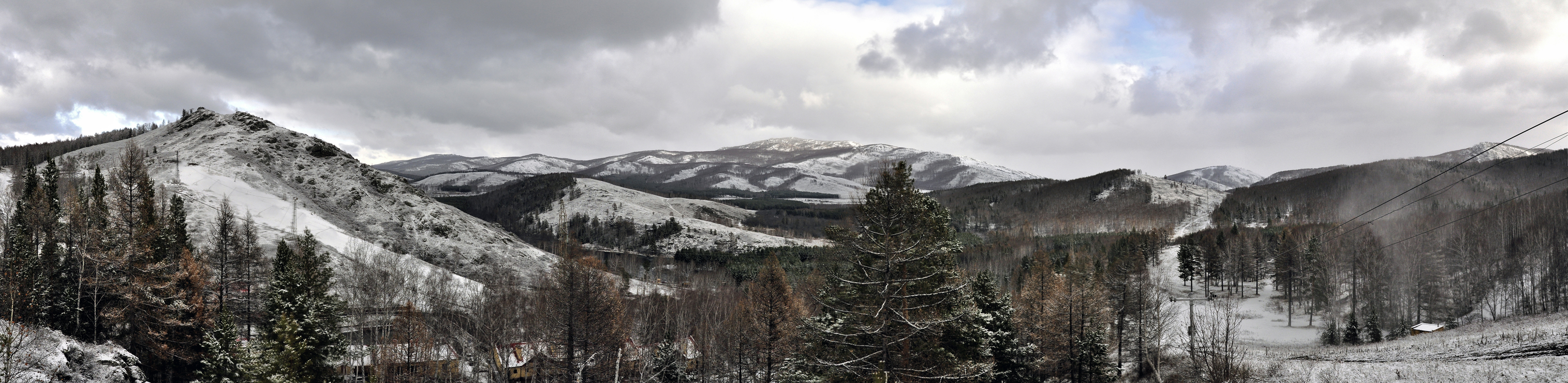
The ski resort "Abzakovo" in Abzelilovsky District. October 2009.

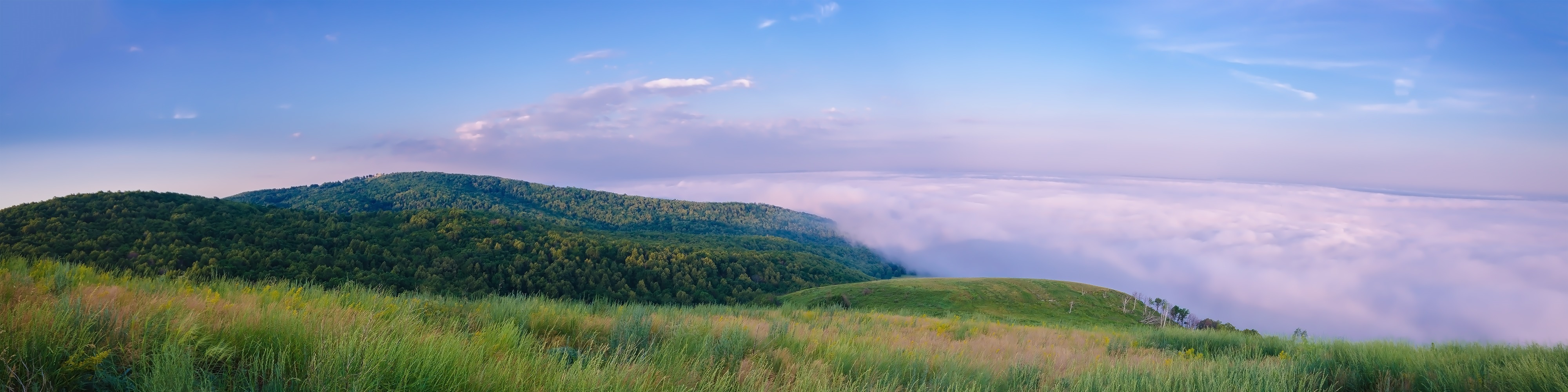
Morning fog in Ishimbaysky District

== Administrative divisions ==
As of 2013, Republic of Bashkortostan is divided into 54 districts, 21 cities or towns, 2 urban type settlements and 827 selsoviets.

== Politics ==
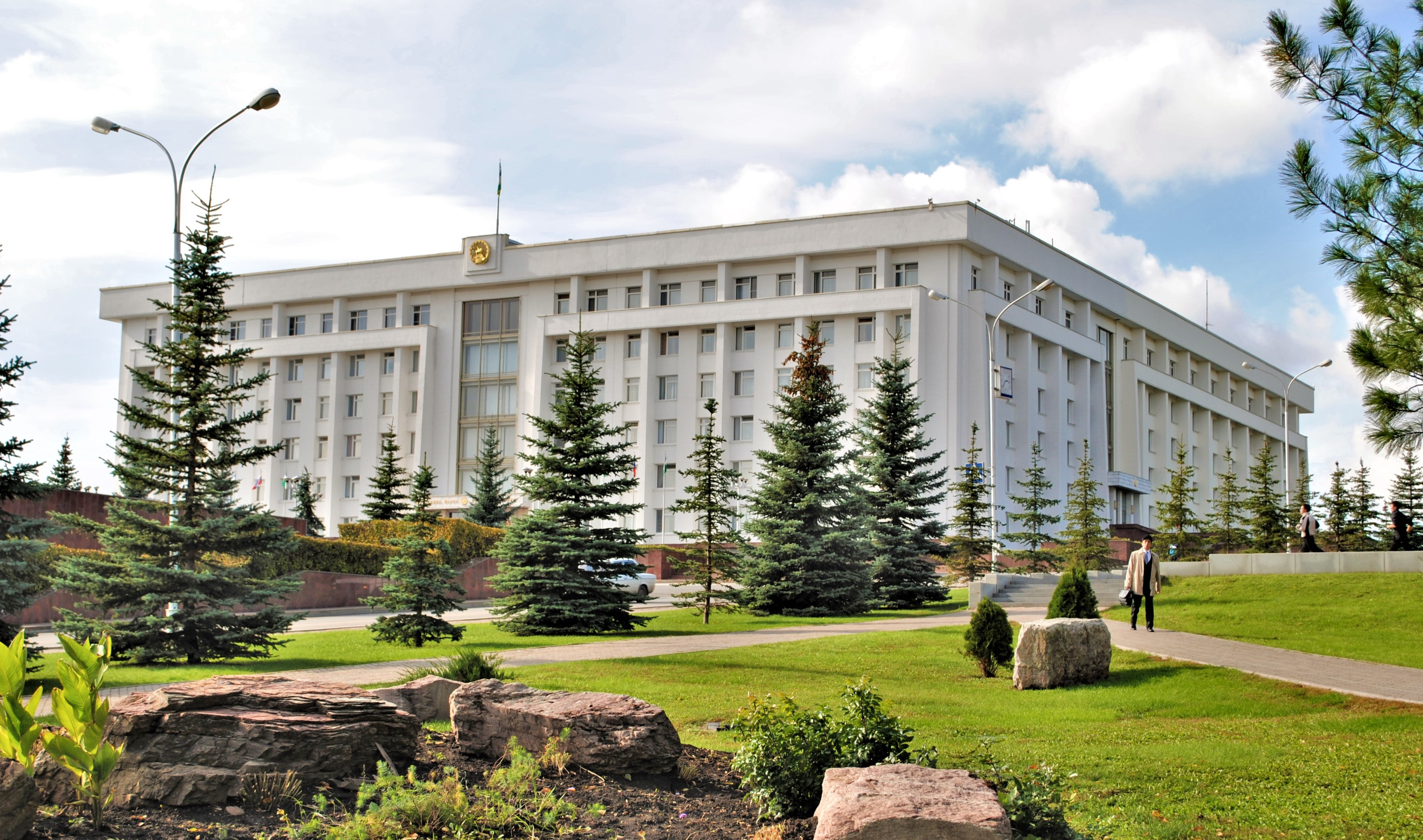
Building of the Government of the Republic also known as Bashkir White House

The head of the government of the Republic of Bashkortostan is called the Head (before 1 January 2015 the title was "President"). According to the Constitution, the Head of the Republic of Bashkortostan guarantees rights and liberties to the country's people and citizens, protects the economic and political interests of the Republic of Bashkortostan, and secures legitimacy, law, and order within its territory.

Since 11 October 2018, the Head of the Republic of Bashkortostan has been Radiy Khabirov. He was first appointed as acting head by Russian president Vladimir Putin. In 2019 he was elected after winning 82% of the vote in the 2019 Bashkir head election. He was re-elected in the 2024 Bashkir head election. Before his current role, Radiy Khabirov was the Head of Krasnogorsk, Moscow Oblast. His predecessor was Rustem Khamitov, the leader after 19 July 2010. He resigned on 11 October 2018 ahead of the election because he decided to not run for reelection.

The Republic's parliament is the State Assembly—Kurultai, popularly elected every five years. The one-chamber State Assembly has 110 deputies.

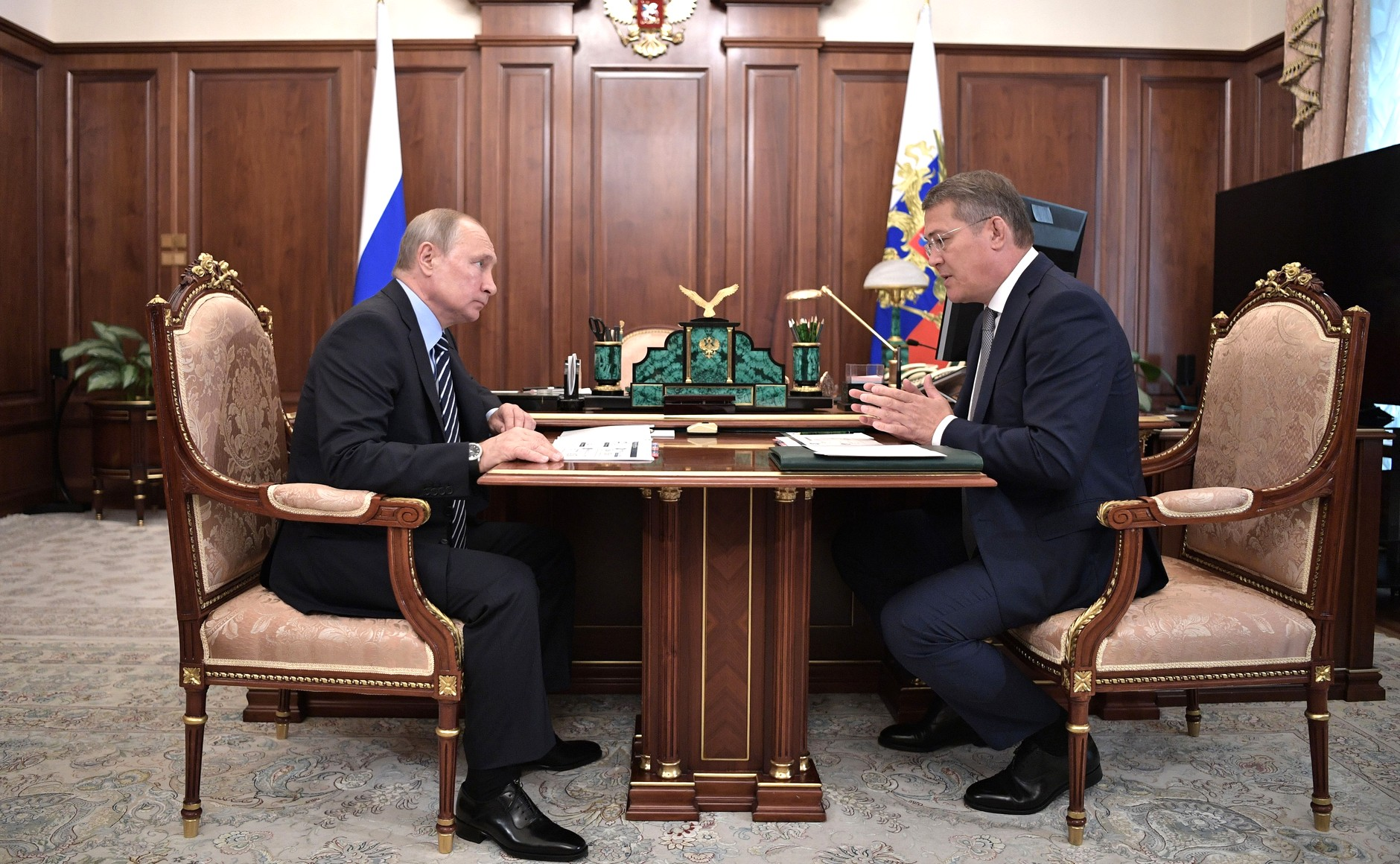
Bashkortostan's leader Radiy Khabirov with Russian president Vladimir Putin, 26 August 2019

The Republic's Constitution was adopted on 24 December 1993. Article 1 of the Constitution stipulates that Bashkortostan is a sovereign state within Russia, it has state power beyond the limits of the authority of the Russian Federation and the powers of the Russian Federation concerning the aspect of the joint authority of the Russian Federation and the Republic of Bashkortostan. The Republic of Bashkortostan is a full-fledged subject of the Russian Federation on equal and agreed bases.

The relations of the Republic of Bashkortostan and the Russian Federation are based on the articles of the Constitution of the Russian Federation, the Constitution of the Republic of Bashkortostan, the Federative Treaty (with amendments) and the Agreement on Separation of authorities and powers and mutual delegating of powers among the organs of state power of the Republic of Bashkortostan.

The judicial power of the republic is in the hands of the Supreme Court, the Court of Appeals, district courts, and justices of the peace.

In full accord with universally recognized principles of international law, articles of the European Charter of Local Self-Government and the Constitution of the Russian Federation, the Republic of Bashkortostan ensures in its Constitution that local self-government is recognized and guaranteed within the republic's territory.

The Republic of Bashkortostan resolves all issues of administrative-territorial structure on its own. The list of districts and towns, municipalities, as well as the order of establishing, amending and changing borders of municipalities and their names, are stipulated by the Republic of Bashkortostan law "On administrative-territorial structure of the Republic of Bashkortostan and territory of municipalities".

The state has strong economic and cultural ties with its western neighbour, the Republic of Tatarstan.

== Economy ==
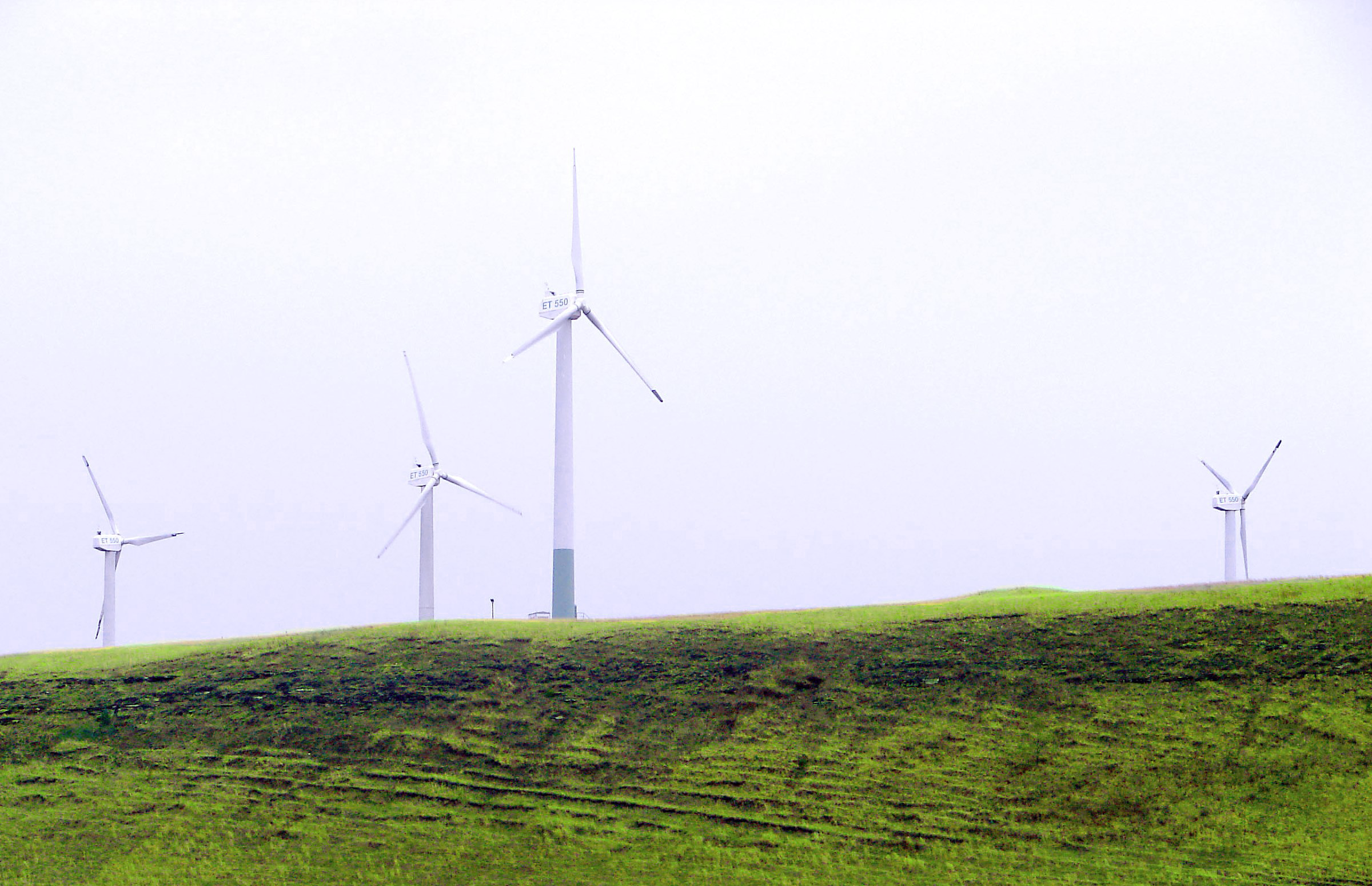
Tyupkildy wind park

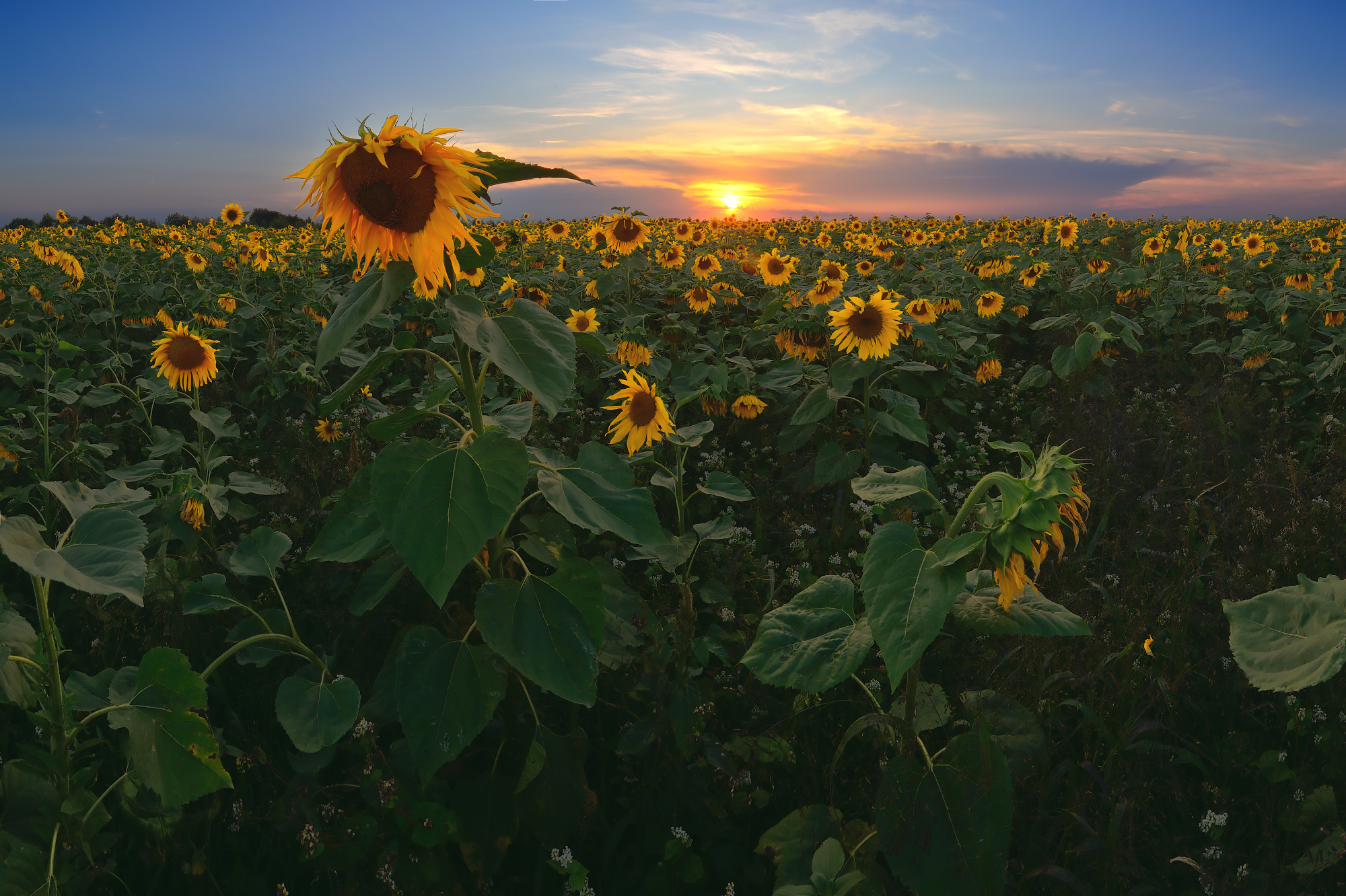
Sunflower field in Ishimbaysky District. Bashkortostan has a developed agriculture

Bashkortostan is one of the Russian Federation's most developed regions in terms of its cross-regional output, the volume of industrial production, agricultural production, and investment in fixed assets.

The region's largest companies include Bashneft, Ufa Engine Industrial Association (part of United Engine Corporation), Peton Holding, Bashkhim, Ufaorgsintez, Beloretsk Iron and Steel Works.

The extraction of crude oil in Bashkiria began in 1932. with major deposits first discovered in 1943. During the Great Patriotic War, Bashkiria became one of the major regions of the Soviet Union to accommodate plants and factories evacuated from Western Russia, as well as great masses of people, while also providing the country with weaponry, fuel, and foodstuffs. After the war, several industries developed further in Bashkiria, such as mining (Bakr-Tay and Blyavinsky copper mines), machine-building and oil-refining. Bashkiria's industry became a base for the further economic growth of all European outlying territories of Russia.

Bashkortostan has a diverse economy, including a large agricultural sector. But the republic's most important industry is chemical processing. Bashkortostan produces more oil than any other region of Russia, about 26 million tons annually, and provides 17% of the country's gasoline and 15% of its diesel fuel. Other important products manufactured in Bashkortostan include alcohols, pesticides, and plastics. In 2026, during the Russo-Ukrainian War, the agricultural grain harvest achieved record levels for a second year but had insufficient local storage, transport, and export options such that a surplus of over 2.5 million tons remained, and had to be covered in plastic and stored in the fields. Transport by road is virtually impossible and the large volume would require 640 trains, unprofitable in the current restricted export market due to the war.

Bashkortostan's gross regional product (GRP) in 2016 was 1.34 trillion rubles, making the republic the subject with the ninth-highest GRP in Russia. The state had a positive trade balance, with $13.7 billion exported and $1.2 billion imported in 2013. As much as 82.9% of enterprises in Bashkortostan are profitable, higher than the nationwide average of 68.42%. Bashkortostan has been recognized as the region with the lowest economic risk.

Bashkortostan is among the leaders in real estate development, developed electric power industry and tourism.

Ufa was ranked by Forbes as among the best cities for business in Russia in 2013.

=== Structure of GRP ===
GRP structure of Bashkortostan for 2013.

Sector	%
Manufacturing	36.2
Wholesale and retail trade	16.7
Transport and communications	7.3
Real estate transactions	7
Construction	6.9
Agriculture	6.5
Education	4.1
Healthcare and social services	4.1
State management and social insurance	3.8
Mining	2.8
Production of electricity, gas, water	2.4
Hotels and restaurants	1.1
Other	1.1

Some industrial products of Bashkortostan

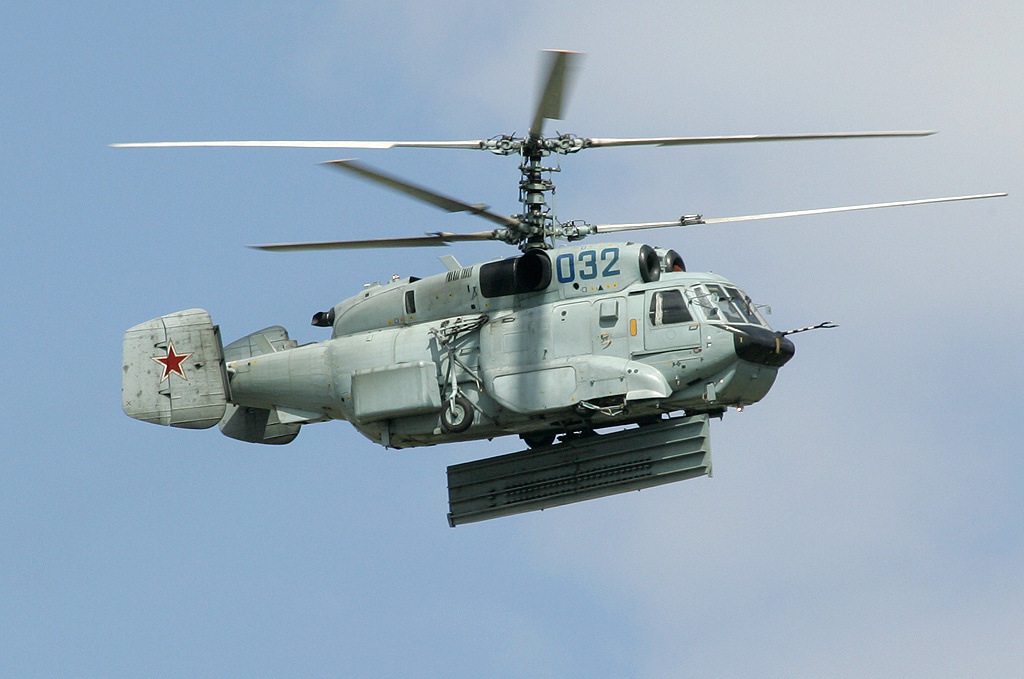
Ka-31 helicopter, produced in Kumertau.

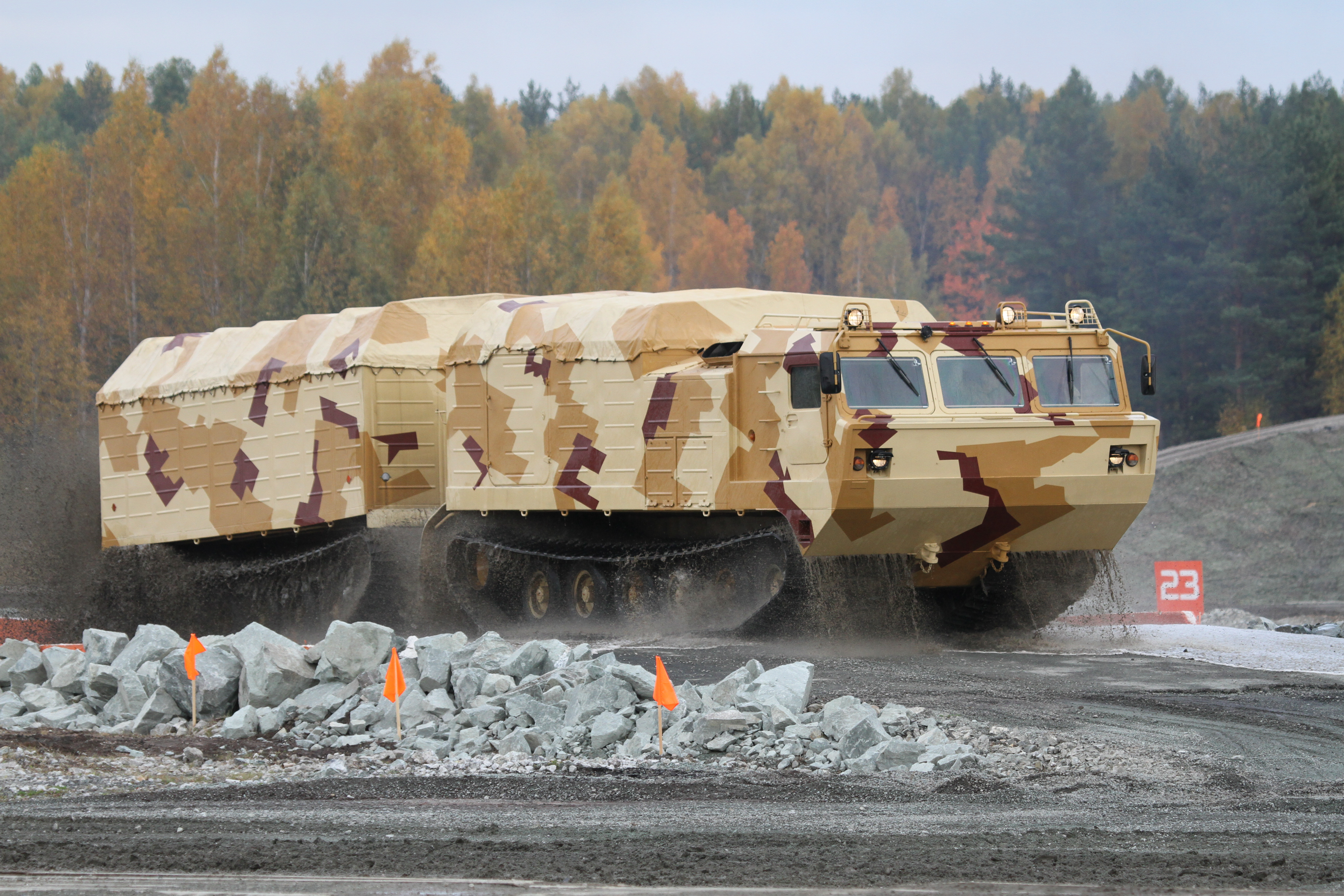
DT-30 amphibious ATV, made in Ishimbay.

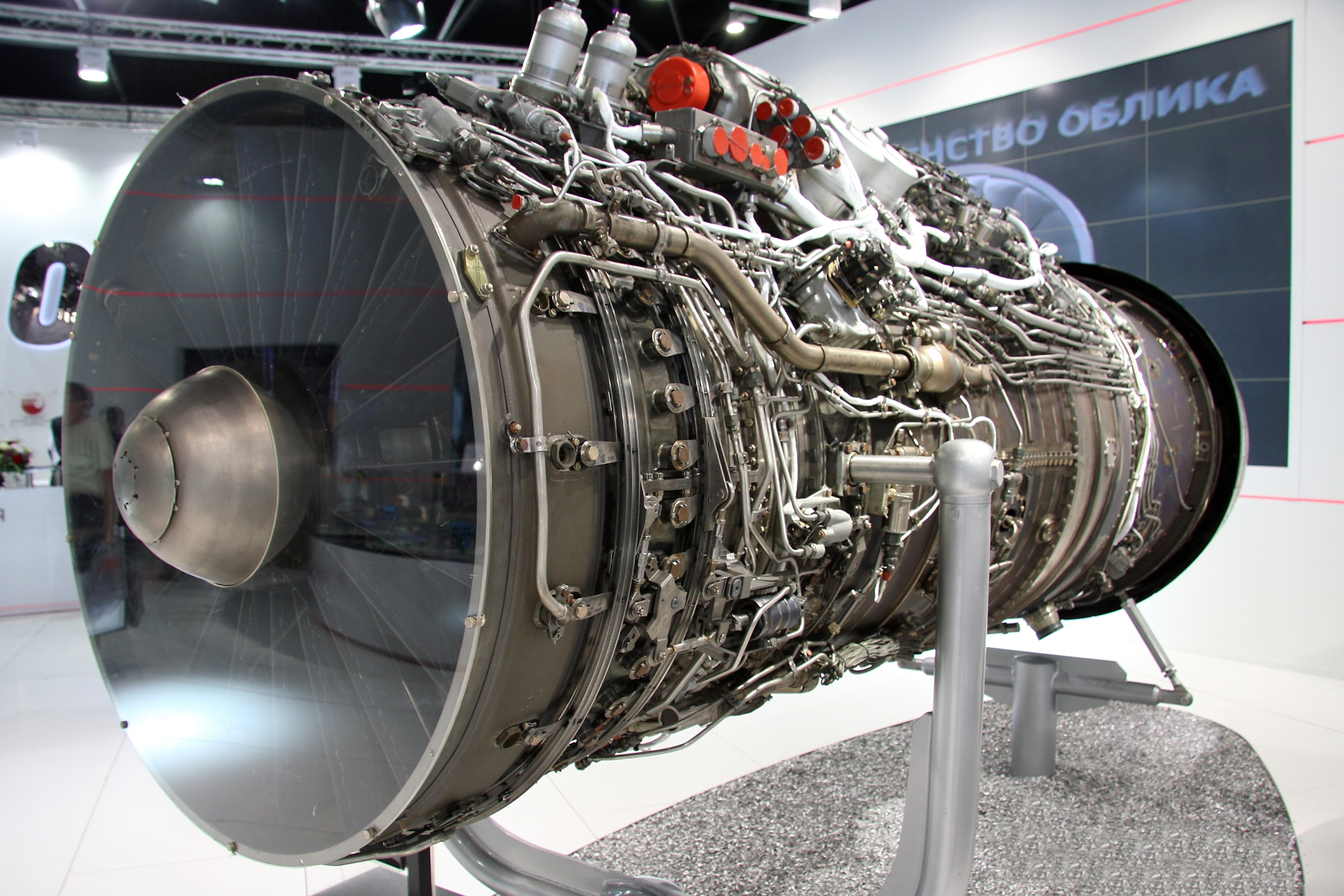
AL-41F1 engine for PAK FA fifth-generation fighter and Su-35S, produced in Ufa.

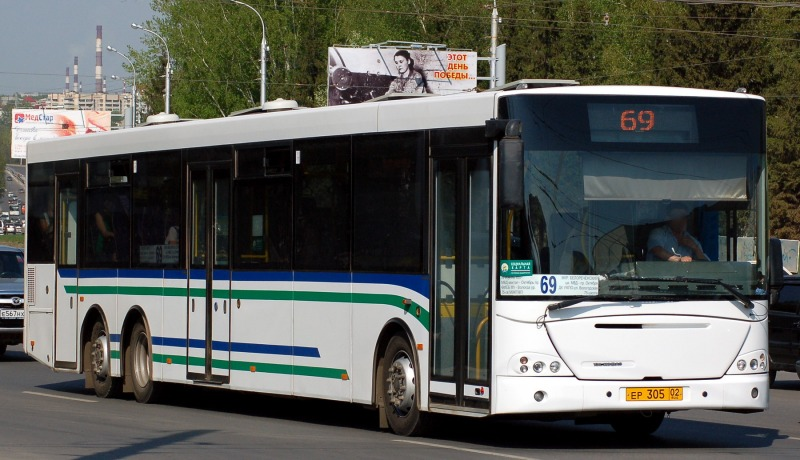
Nefaz-VDL bus of Neftekamsk Automotive Plant.

== Tourism ==
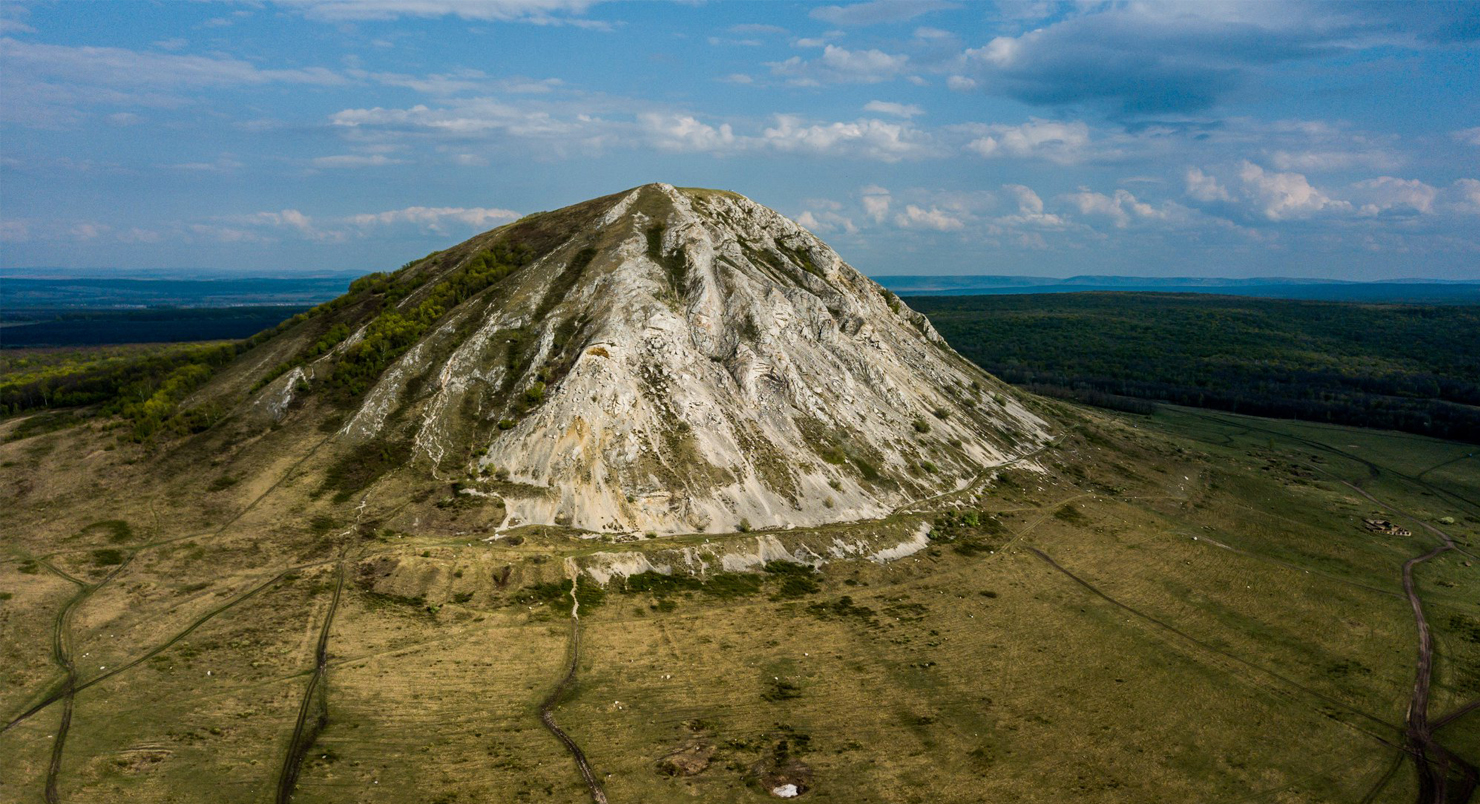
Geopark Toratau

Tourism in the region is regulated by the Russian Federation. Efforts are underway to enhance tourism and hospitality in the northeast region. These initiatives are founded on the innovative scientific, educational, and industrial infrastructure of the Geopark "Yangan-Tau."

== Demographics ==
=== Settlements ===
Largest cities or towns in Bashkortostan 2010 Russian Census
Rank	Name	Administrative Division	Pop.
1	Ufa	Ufimsky District	1,062,319
2	Sterlitamak	Sterlitamaksky District	273,486
3	Salavat	City of republic significance of Salavat	156,095
4	Neftekamsk	City of republic significance of Neftekamsk	121,733
5	Oktyabrsky	City of republic significance of Oktyabrsky	109,474
6	Beloretsk	Beloretsky District	68,806
7	Tuymazy	Tuymazinsky District	66,836
8	Ishimbay	Ishimbaysky District	66,259
9	Kumertau	Town of republic significance of Kumertau	62,851
10	Sibay	Town of republic significance of Sibay	62,763

Historical population
Year	Pop.	±%
1897	1,991,000	—
1926	2,545,165	+27.8%
1939	3,158,000	+24.1%
1959	3,341,609	+5.8%
1970	3,818,075	+14.3%
1979	3,848,627	+0.8%
1989	3,950,482	+2.6%
2002	4,104,336	+3.9%
2010	4,072,292	−0.8%
2021	4,091,423	+0.5%
Source: Census data

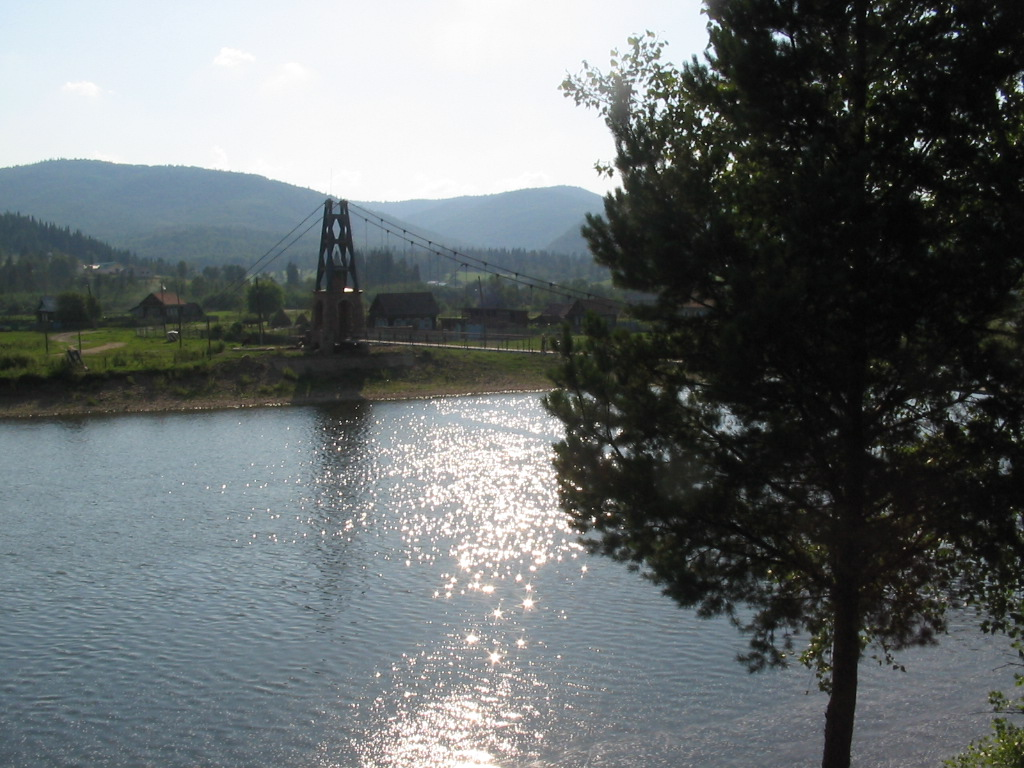
Bashkir village Brishtamak on the Inzer River

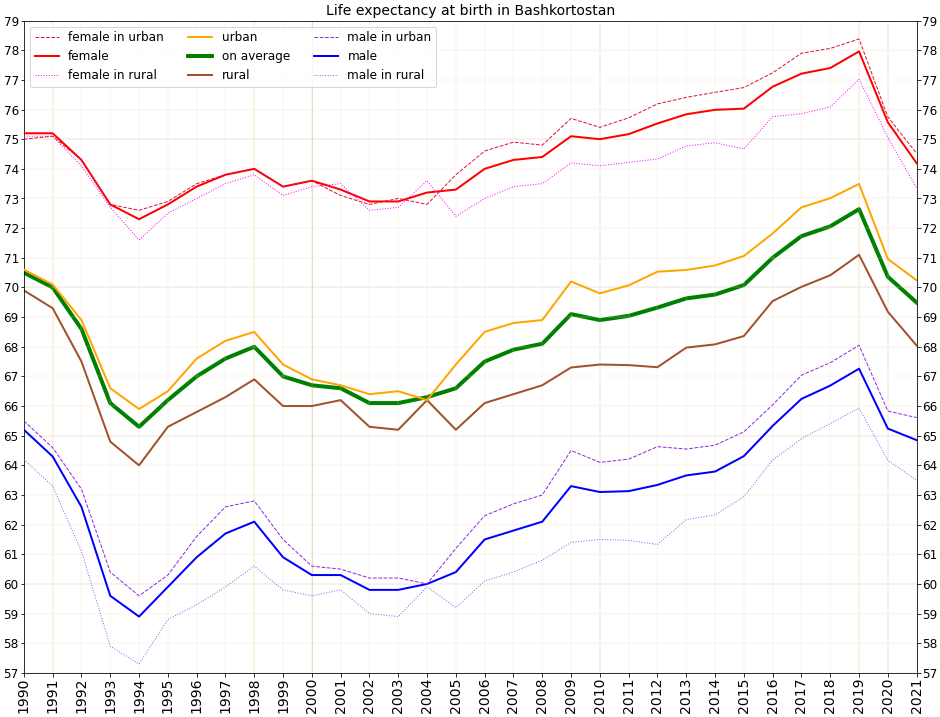
Life expectancy at birth in Bashkortostan

=== Ethnic groups ===
Bashkirs are the indigenous (autochthonal) peoples of Bashkortostan. According to the 2021 Census, the ethnic composition was:

- Russians 36.89%
- Bashkirs 31.01%
- Volga Tatars 23.82%
- Mari 2.1%
- Chuvash 2.08%
- Udmurts 0.42%
- Ukrainians 0.36%

Ethnic group	1920 Census		1926 Census		1939 Census		1959 Census		1970 Census		1979 Census		1989 Census		2002 Census		2010 Census		2021 Census^{1}	
Ethnic group	Number	%	Number	%	Number	%	Number	%	Number	%	Number	%	Number	%	Number	%	Number	%	Number	%
Bashkirs	254,921	14.10%	625,845	23.48%	671,188	21.25%	737,711	22.08%	892,248	23.37%	935,880	24.34%	863,808	21.91%	1,221,302	29.76%	1,172,287	28.79%	1,268,806	31.5%
Russians	640,626	35.44%	1,064,707	39.95%	1,281,347	40.56%	1,418,147	42.44%	1,546,304	40.50%	1,547,893	40.26%	1,548,291	39.27%	1,490,715	36.32%	1,432,906	36.05%	1,509,246	37.50%
Kazan Tatars+Mishar Tatars+Kryashens+Teptyars	603,103	33.37%	461,877	23.30%	777,230	24.60%	768,566	23.0%	944,505	24.74%	940,436	24.46%	1,120,702	28.42%	990,702	24.14%	1,009,295	24.78%	974,533	24.2%
Mari	82,971	4.59%	79,298	2.98%	90,163	2.85%	93,902	2.81%	109,638	2.87%	106,793	2.78%	105,768	2.68%	105,829	2.58%	103,658	2.55%	84,988	2.10%
Chuvash	43,358	2.40%	84,886	3.18%	106,892	3.38%	109,970	3.29%	126,638	3.32%	122,344	3.18%	118,509	3.01%	117,317	2.86%	107,450	2.64%	79,950	2.0%
Udmurts	23,907	1.32%	23,256	0.87%	25,103	0.79%	25,388	0.76%	27,918	0.73%	25,906	0.67%	23,696	0.6%	22,625	0.60%	21,477	0.53%	17,149	0.4%
Ukrainians	53,759	2.97%	76,710	2.88%	92,289	2.92%	83,594	2.50%	76,005	1.99%	75,571	1.97%	74,990	1.90%	55,249	1.35%	39,875	0.98%	14,876	0.4%
Others	5,103	5.81%	249,263	9.3%	107,757	3.4%	104,298	3.1%	94,819	2.5%	87,445	2.3%	87,349	2.2%	96,231	2.3%	87,772	2.2%	75,819	1.9%
^{1} 66,056 people were registered from administrative databases, and could not declare an ethnicity. It is estimated that the proportion of ethnicities in this group is the same as that of the declared group.

=== Languages ===
According to the 2021 Census, spoken languages: Russian (97%), Bashkir (23%) and Tatar (20%).

=== Religion ===
Religion in Bashkortostan as of 2012 (Sreda Arena Atlas)
Islam	58.3%
Russian Orthodoxy	17.2%
Other and undeclared	10.2%
Atheism and irreligion	5.4%
Other Christians	4.6%
Mari religion and Rodnovery	2.6%

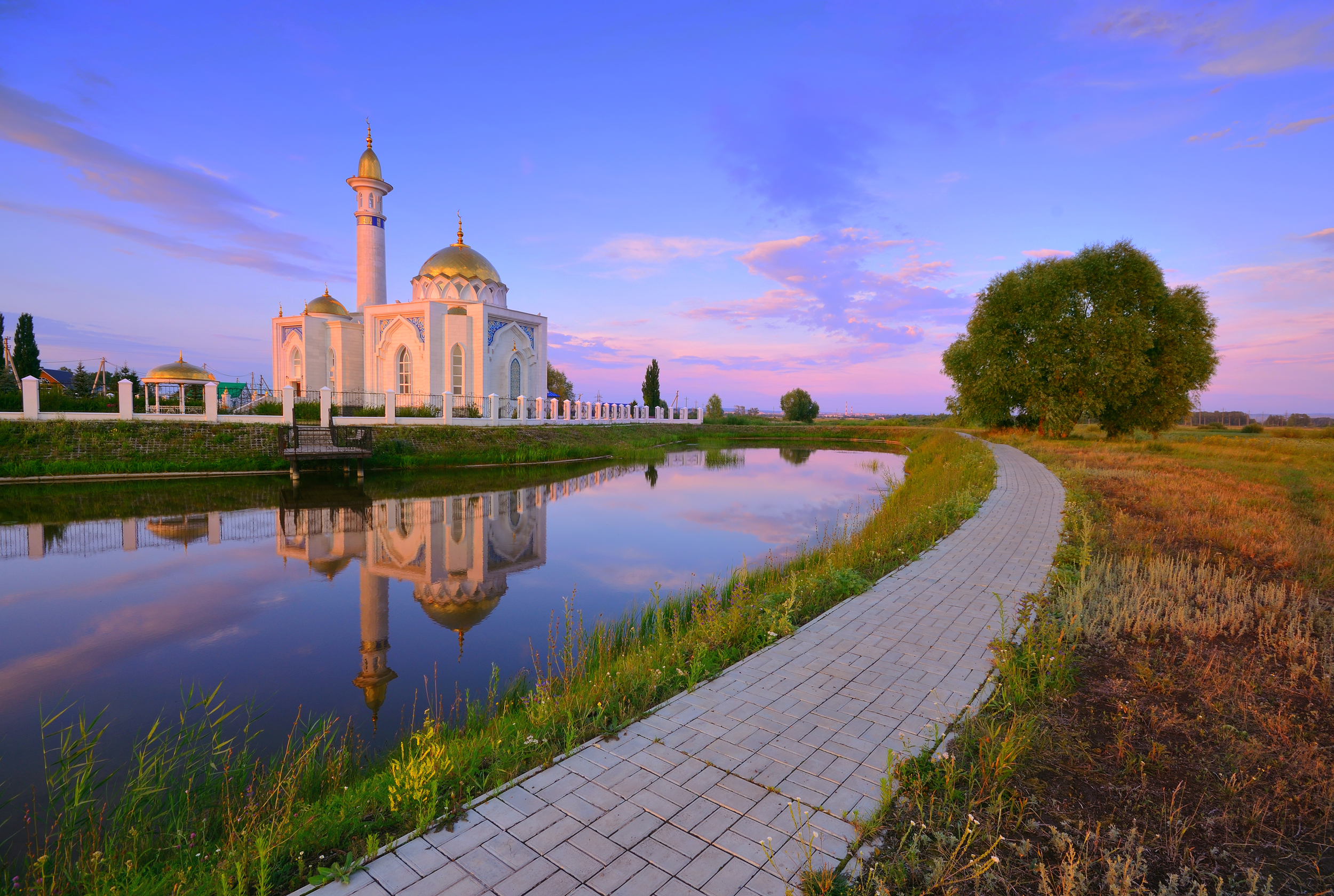
Sufiya Mosque near Salavat

Islam is adhered to by a majority of the nation's population of Bashkir and Tatar descent. The Muslims of Bashkortostan follow the Sunni Hanafi school of Islamic law.

Most ethnic Russians, Chuvash, and Ukrainians are Orthodox Christians. Most Mari are Pagan. Non-religious people form a substantial part of any ethnic group in Bashkortostan. There are 13,000 Jews in the republic, with a historic synagogue in Ufa, and a new Jewish Community Center built in 2008.

According to a 2012 Sreda survey of 56,900 people, 58% of the population of Bashkortostan are Muslim, 17% adhere to the Russian Orthodox Church, 3% are unaffiliated generic Christians, 1% are Orthodox Christian believers without belonging to any church or members of other Orthodox churches, and 2% are adherents of the Slavic native faith (Rodnovery), the Mari native religion, Chuvash Vattisen Yaly or Tengrism. In addition, 4% of the population declare to be "spiritual but not religious", 5% are atheist, and 7% follow other religions or did not give an answer to the question. Note, however, that this survey has been criticized as biased. It was conducted by the service "Sreda", which has ties to the Christian organizations.

In 2010, there were over 1,000 mosques in Bashkortostan, 200 Orthodox churches and 60 religious buildings of other confessions.

=== Education ===
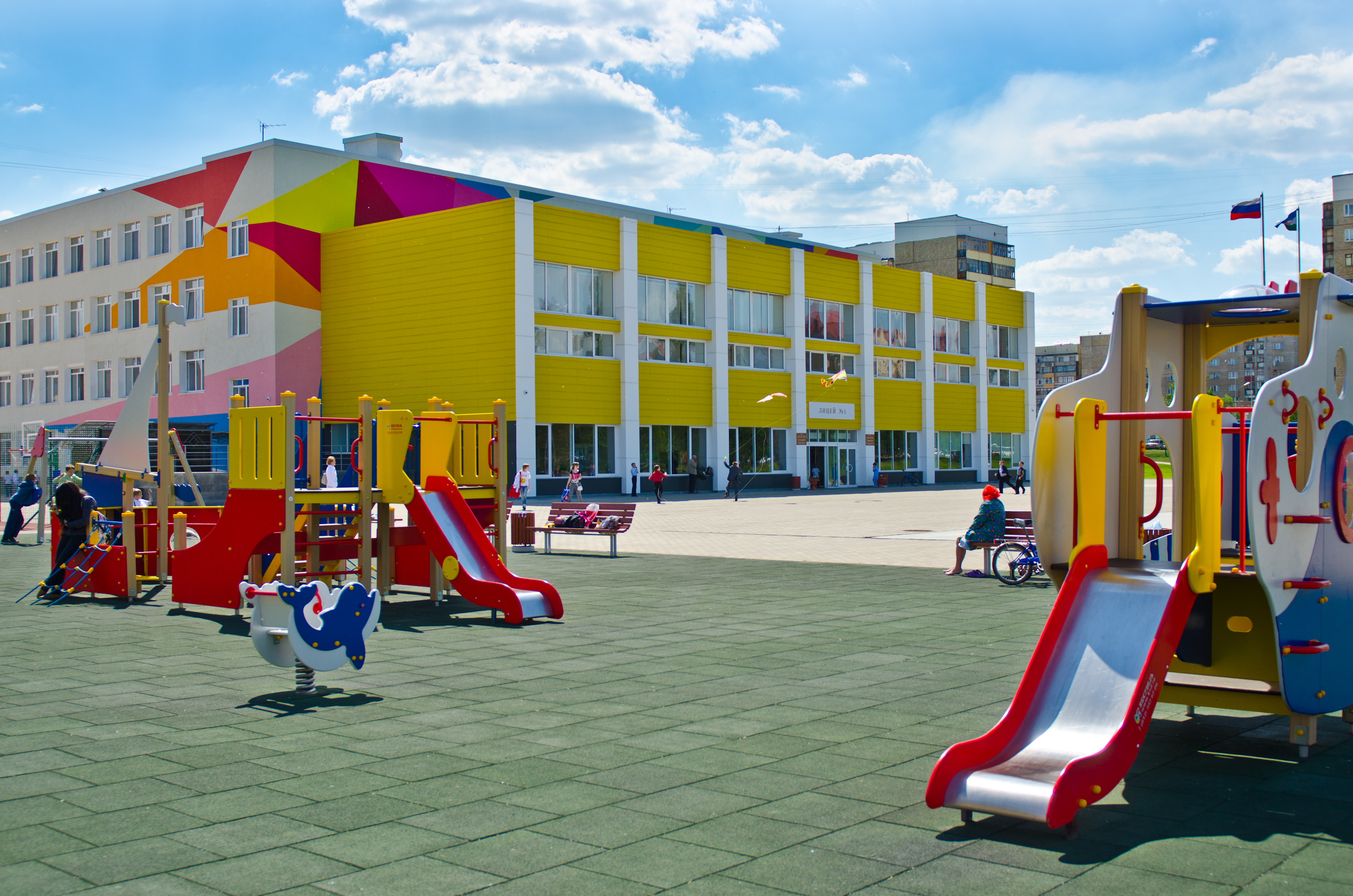
School in Salavat

About sixty scientific organizations are active in the republic. Fundamental and applied scientific research is underway at 12 institutes of the Russian Academy of Sciences, 29 institutes of different branches of industry, as well as numerous design bureaus and organizations, universities, and colleges.

The country's system of popular education took shape over many centuries and reflects the Bashkir people's folklore, national customs, and traditions. When Islam spread in Bashkiria in the 10th century, an educational system began to emerge gradually—primarily religious schools operated under the supervision of mosques (maktabeh and madrasah).

In addition, many institutions of higher education operate in the republic, including branches of 16 leading Russian universities and colleges. Specialists graduate with degrees in about 200 trades and professions.

Education is primarily in Russian and Bashkir.

== Sport ==
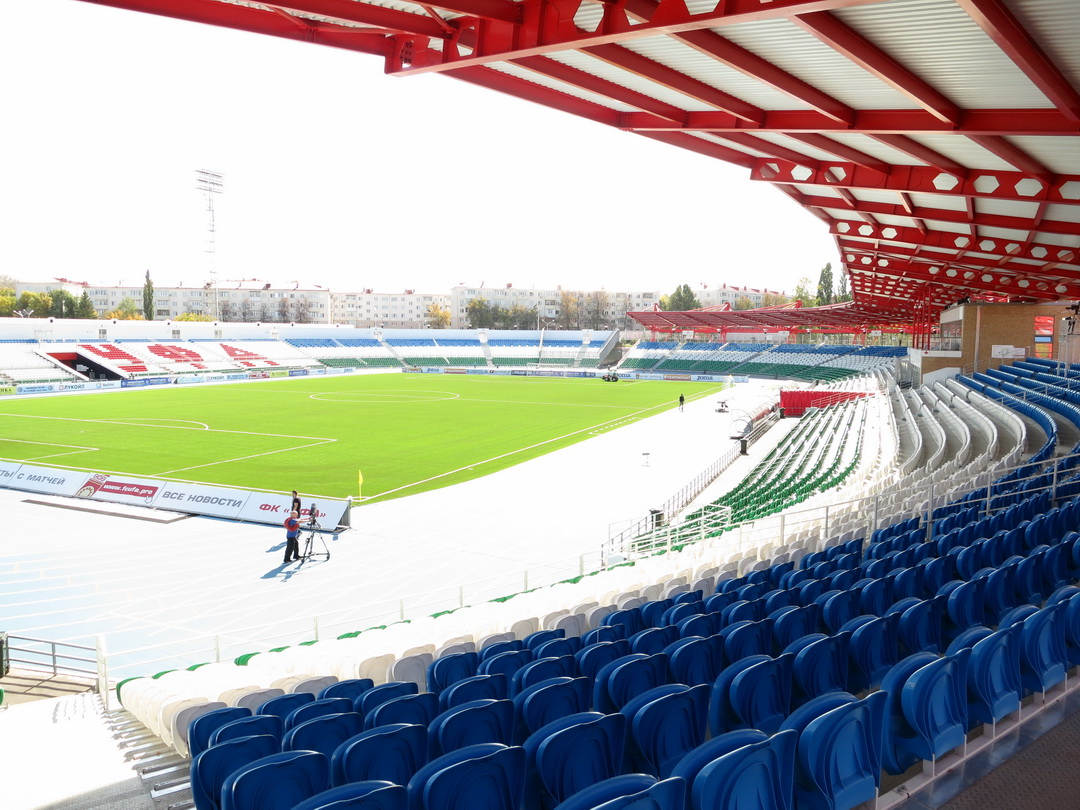
Neftyanik Stadium

Russian Premier League football club FC Ufa is from Ufa. KHL team Salavat Yulaev Ufa plays in the city, as does Supreme Hockey League team Toros Neftekamsk, Minor Hockey League team Tolpar Ufa and Russian Women's Hockey League team Agidel. Russian Volleyball Super League team Ural and volleyball team Samrau-UGNTU are from Ufa. Russian Handball Super League team Ugntu-VNZM and Russian Women's Handball Super League team Ufa-Alisa are from Ufa. Formula One driver Daniil Kvyat hails from Ufa. It was decided in 2018 to revive bandy. There are even preliminary plans for building an indoor arena.

== Culture ==
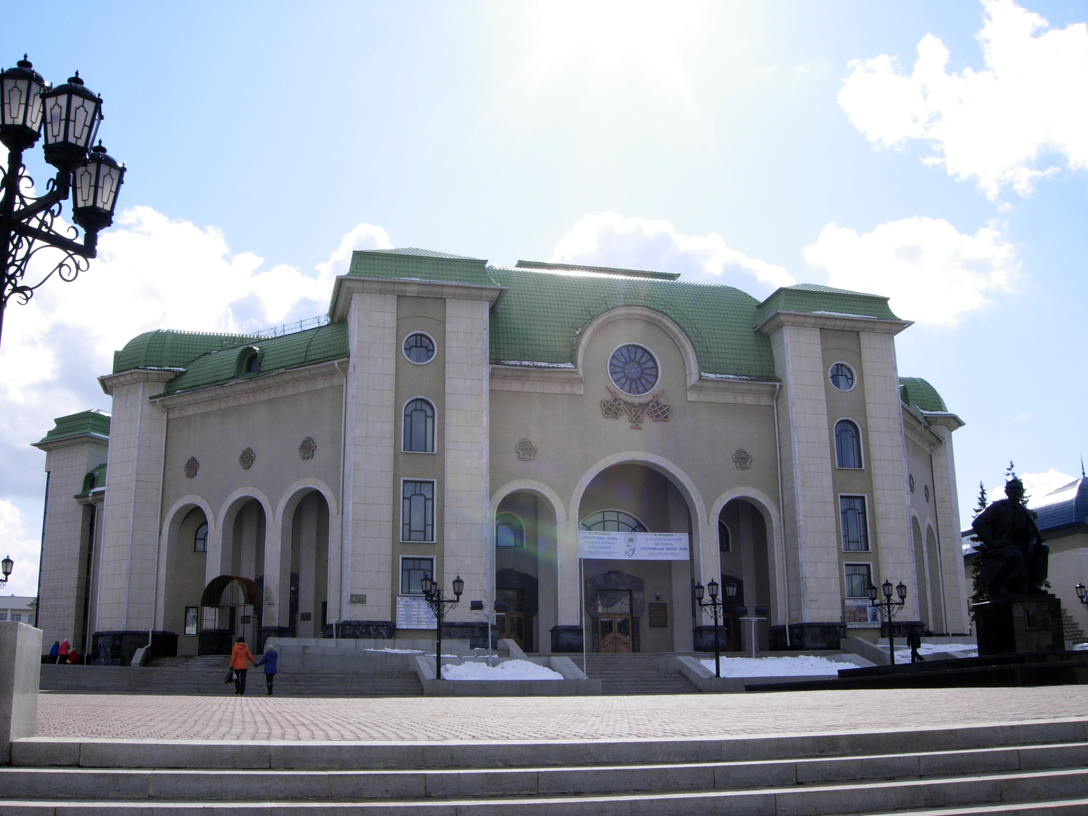
Bashkir State Academic Theater of Drama in Ufa

Bashkortostan is home to song and dance companies, a network of national theaters, museums, and libraries, and a number of annual folk festivals. The republic has seven Bashkir, four Russian, and two Tatar State Drama Theaters, a State Opera and Ballet Theater, a National Symphony Orchestra, "Bashkortostan" film studio, thirty philharmonic collectives, and the Bashkir State Folk Dance Ensemble.

The Bashkir School of Dance is well respected, with many students receiving international awards at competitions in Russia and other countries. World-renowned ballet dancer Rudolf Nureyev, as a child, was encouraged to dance in Bashkir folk performances, and began his dancing career in Ufa.

Bashkir literature is the literary tradition of the Republic of Bashkortostan.

There are many museums in the Republic that chronicle the region's history. The National Museum of the Republic of Bashkortostan, the Bashkir Nesterov Art Museum, the Museum of Archeology and Ethnography are the largest of them.

== See also ==
- Bashkir cuisine
