= Brishtamak =

Brishtamak Бриштамак
- Selo
- Location within Bashkortostan Location within Russia
- Coordinates: 54°22′N 57°29′E
- Country: Russia
- Region: Bashkortostan
- District: Beloretsky District
- Time zone: UTC+5:00

Brishtamak (Russian: Бриштамак; Bashkir: Берештамаҡ, Bereştamaq) is a rural locality (a selo) in Assinsky Selsoviet, Beloretsky District, Bashkortostan, Russia. The population was 283 as of 2010. There are 3 streets.

== Geography ==
Brishtamak is located 119 km northwest of Beloretsk (the district's administrative centre) by road. Brish is the nearest rural locality.
