= Iremel =

Mount Iremel
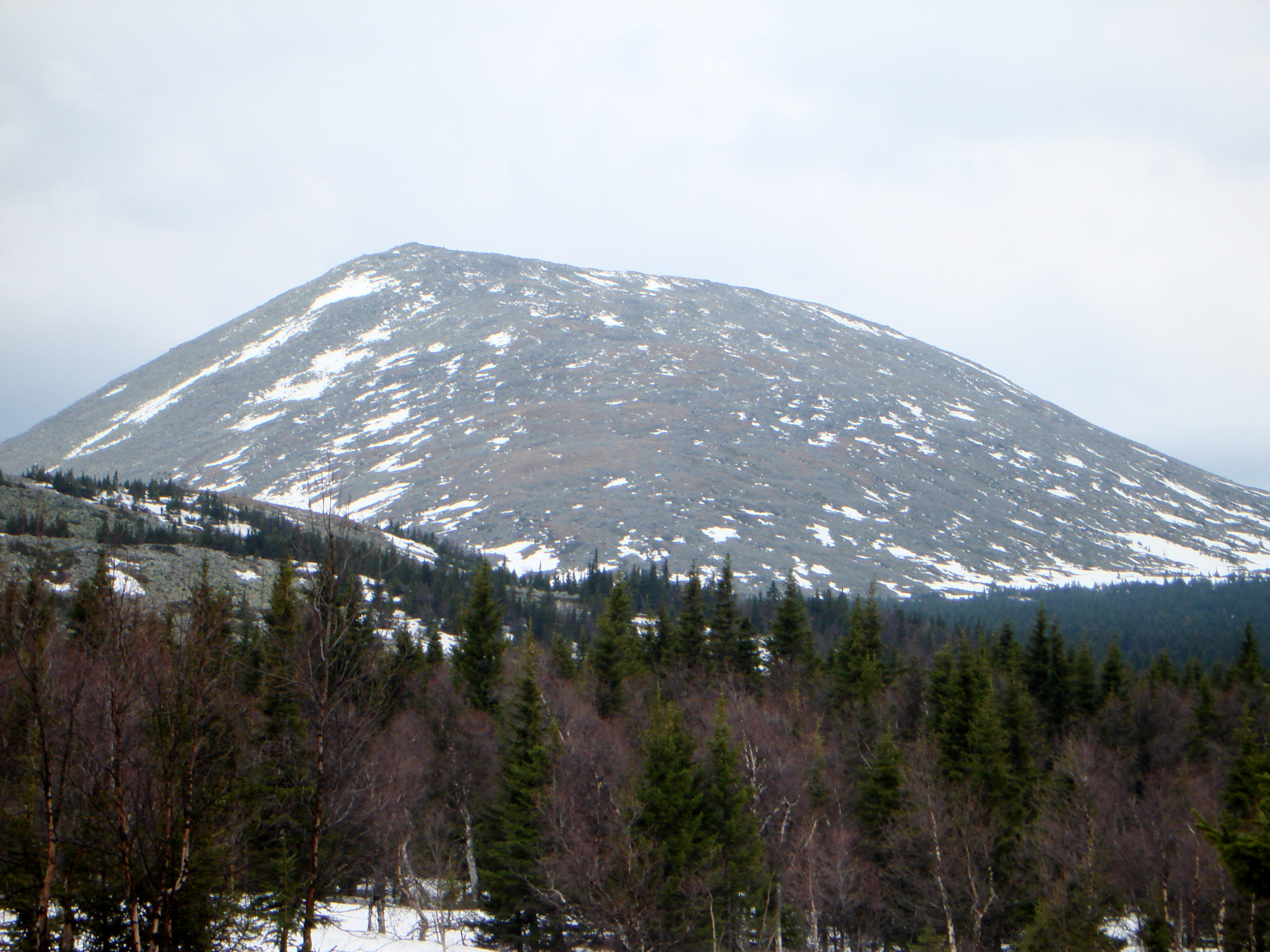

Highest point
- Elevation: 1,589 m (5,213 ft)
- Coordinates: 54°30′54″N 58°50′24″E

Geography
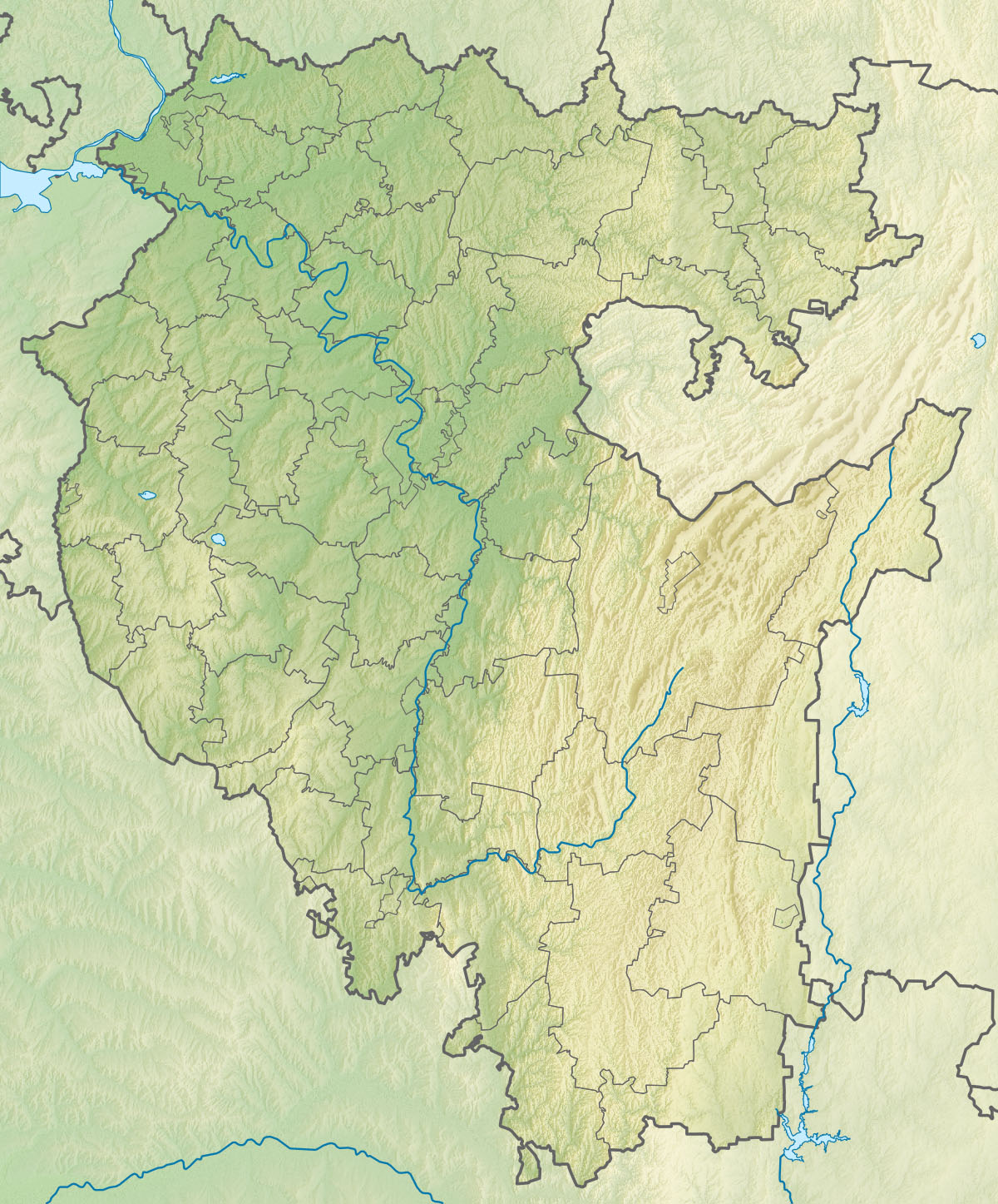
- Location within Bashkortostan Location within European Russia
- Location: Republic of Bashkortostan, Russia
- Parent range: Ural Mountains

Iremel (Bashkir: Ирәмәл, Russian: Иремель) is a compact mountain ridge in the Southern Ural Mountains in the republic of Bashkortostan, Russian Federation (bordering with Chelyabinsk Oblast to the north-west). The highest peak, Bolshoy Iremel (Big Iremel), or simply Iremel, stands at 1,589 metres (5200 ft) high. Maly Iremel (Small Iremel), 6 kilometers north-east, stands at 1,449 meters. It is the source of the 1,430 kilometres long River Belaya.

The highest peak of the South Urals, Mount Yamantaw (1,638 meters) is located 53 kilometers south-west from Bolshoy Iremel.

== Gallery ==
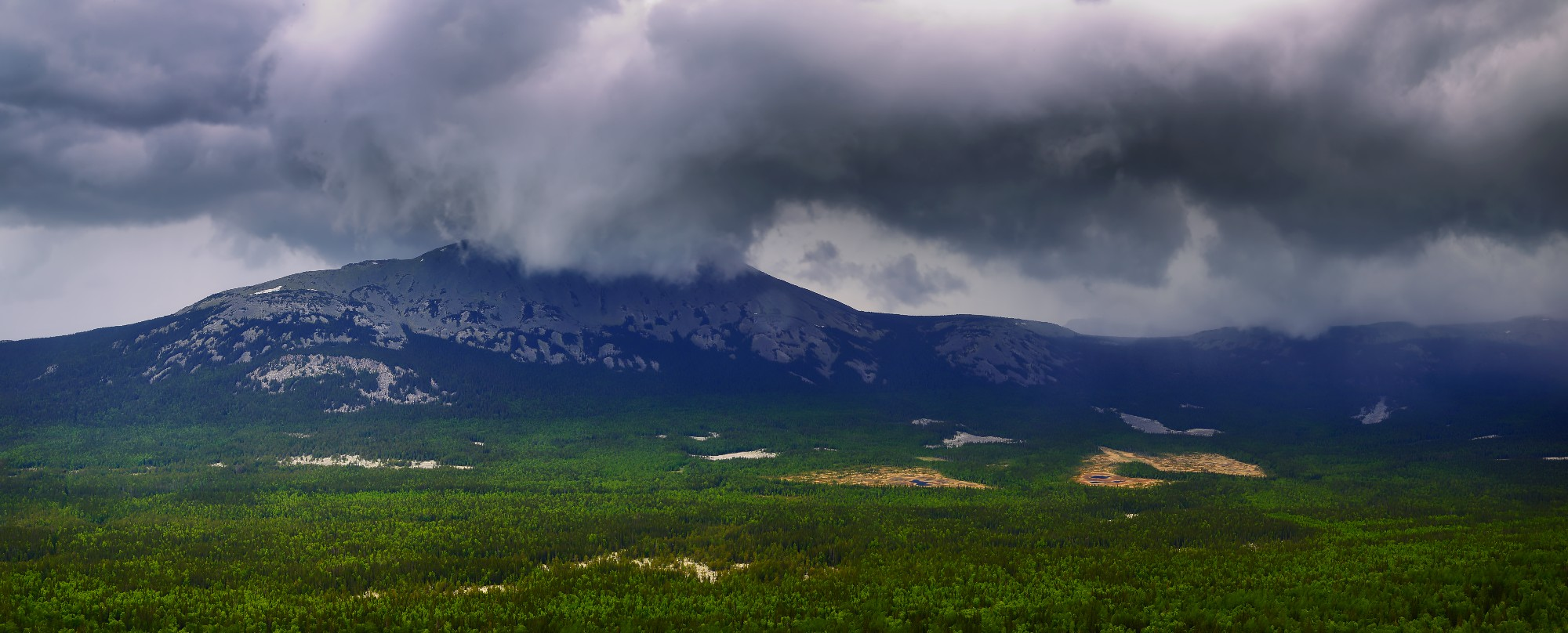
Storm clouds over Iremel.
