= Beloretsk Iron and Steel Works =

OJSC Beloretsk Steelmaking Plant
- Native name: ОАО Белорецкий металлургический комбинат
- Company type: Public (OAO)
- Industry: Steel
- Headquarters: Beloretsk, Russia
- Products: Steel; Steel products
- Revenue: 87,200,000 United States dollar (1994)

Beloretsk steelmaking plant (Russian: Белорецкий металлургический комбинат, Beloretskiy Metallurgicheskiy Kombinat; Bashkir: Белорет металлургия комбинаты,), abbreviated as BMK, is the steel company in Russia. It is located in the city of Beloretsk, in Bashkortostan.

== History ==
In the past, the main area for Russian iron production was the Tula region. However, during the early 18th century, there was a shift towards developing the industrial capabilities of the Urals, resulting in more than doubling Russia's iron production.

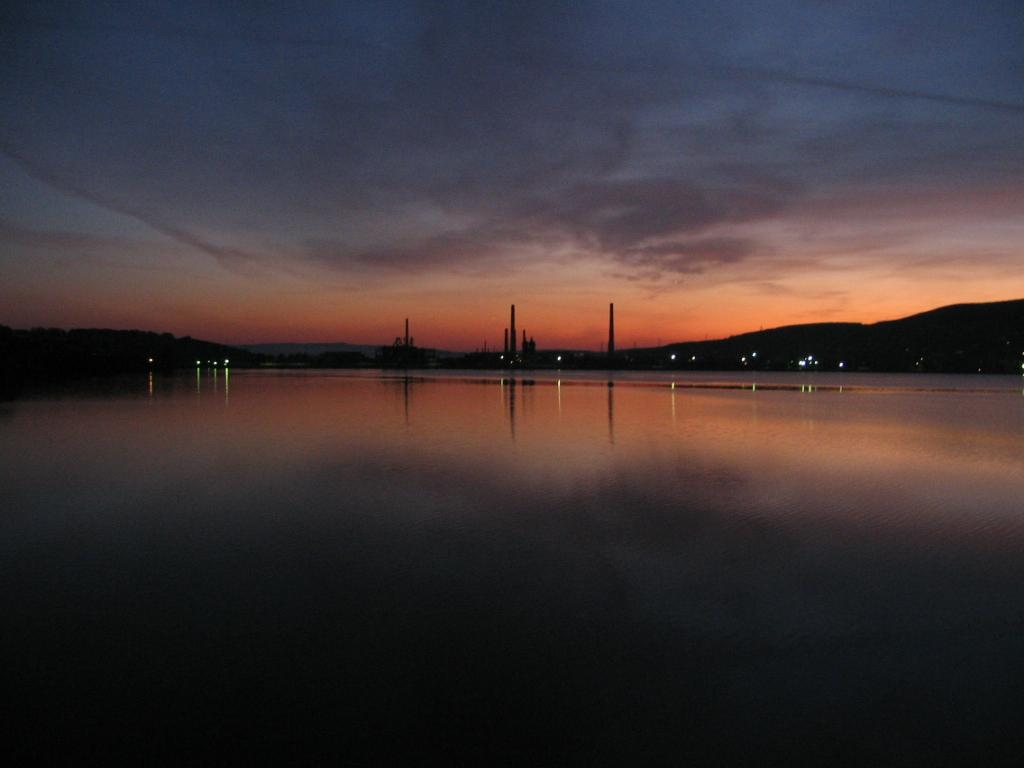
Beloretsk Iron and Steel Works

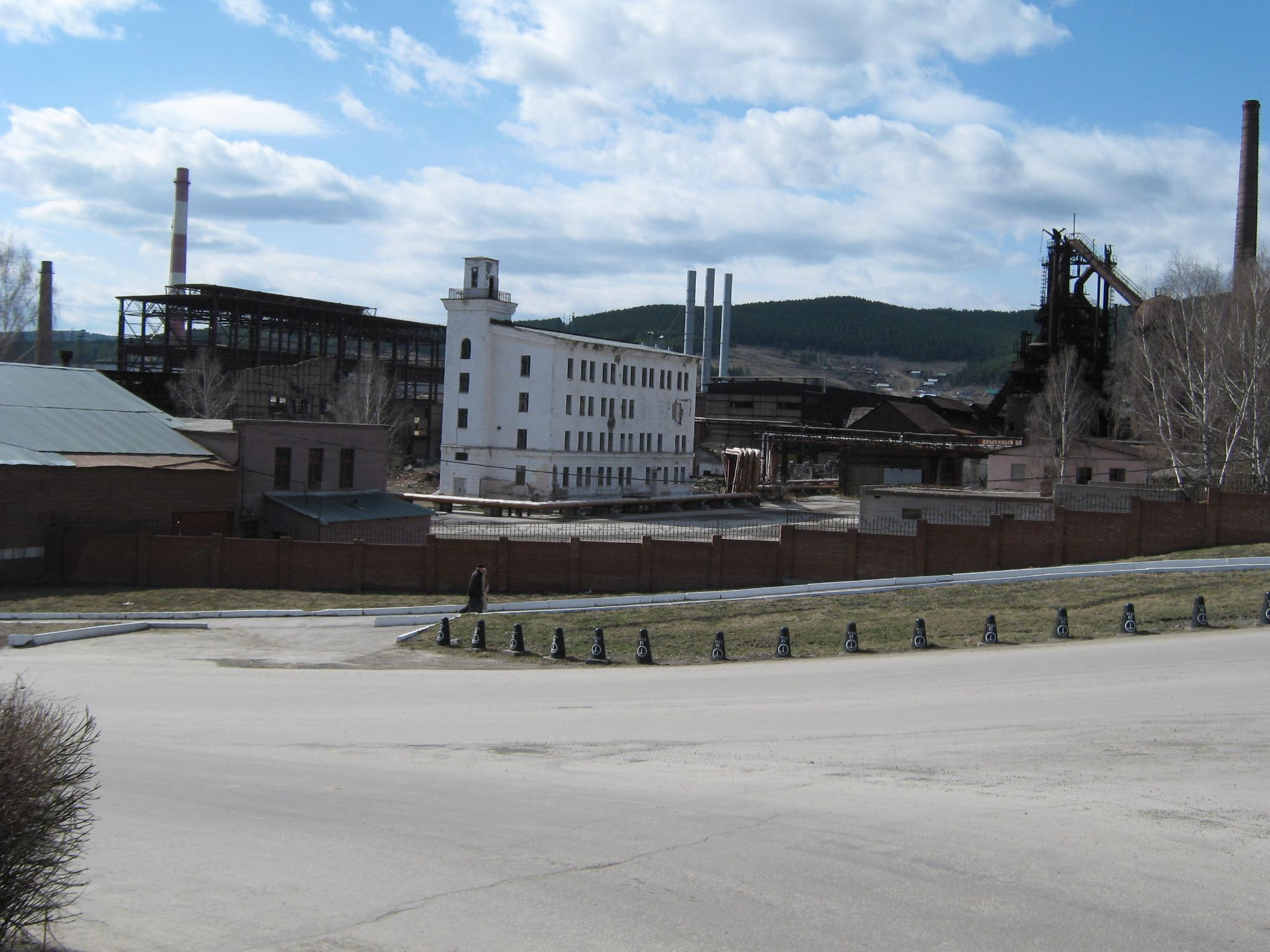
Beloretsk Iron and Steel Works

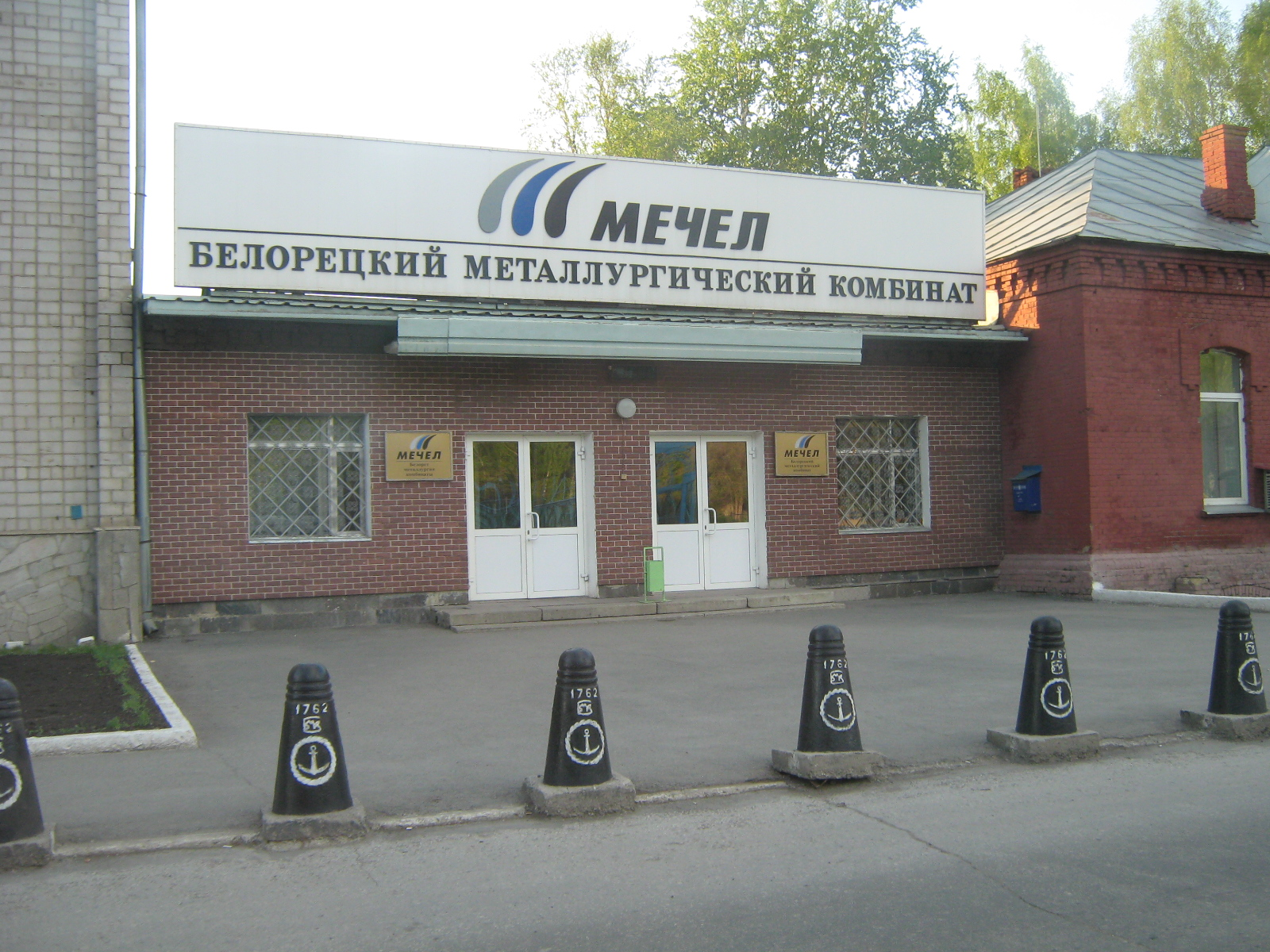
Beloretsk Iron and Steel Works
