= Shardak =

Russian River

The Shardak (Bashkir: Шарҙаҡ, Şarźaq) is a river in the Tatyshlinsky District of Bashkortostan, in Russia; it flows into the river Yug (Bashkir: Йоҡ, Yoq, a tributary of the Bystry Tanyp). It flows past the villages Old Shardak (Bashkir: Иҫке Шарҙаҡ ) and New Shardak (Bashkir: Яңы Шарҙаҡ, Yañı Şarźaq).

== Etymology of the name Shardak ==
Hydronym 'Shardak' has Finno-Ugric origin, now the term 'Shardak' is preserved in Bashkirs from Urman-Girey clan and means - 'fishing net'. The term and hydronym in the form of a “Shardz” is also preserved in the Ugro-Finnish languages themselves, for example, in Komi, Mari, Sámi, Finnish languages. So in the languages Komi-Ziryane and Komi-Permyak from Perm Krai, fishing tackle is called a Shardz. A number of rivers and lakes where Mari, Komi, Finns (Suomi), Sámi live are still called Shardi, Sharda.

If initially from Finno Ugric fishermen 'sharda' (шарда) meant 'fishing tackle', then among Finno Ugric hunters, moose began to be called 'shardi' (шарды).

== Water registry data ==
According to State Water Register of Russia refers to Kama River, the water sector of the river is Belaya from the city Birsk and to the mouth, the river sub-basin of the river is Belaya. The river basin of the river is Kama

== Geographical location ==
Distance to:

- district center (Verkhniye Tatyshly): 12 km,
- center of the village council (Kaltyaevo): 7 km,
- the nearest railway station (Kueda): 37 km.
