= Assel River =

Assel Albayevka
- Location of the river in Russia
- Etymology: Named after the Bashkir word for solonchak
- Native name: Ассель (Russian); Әселе (Bashkir)

Location
- Country: Russia
- Region: Bashkortostan and Orenburg Oblast

Physical characteristics
- Source
  - location: Zianchurinsky District, Bashkortostan, Russia
  - coordinates: 52°0′21″N 56°59′38″E
  - elevation: 393 m (1,289 ft)
- Mouth: Bolshoy Ik
  - location: 14 km along the left bank
  - coordinates: 51°53′36″N 56°31′58″E
  - elevation: 142 m (466 ft)
- Length: 51 km (32 mi)
- Basin size: 358 km^{2} (138 mi^{2})

Basin features
- Progression: Bolshoy Ik→ Sakmara→ Ural→ Caspian Sea
- River system: Ural Basin

Assel (Russian: Ассель; Bashkir: Әселе, Äsele) is a river in Russia, that flows through Bashkortostan and the Orenburg Oblast. The river mouth is 14 km along the left bank of the Bolshoy Ik. The river is 51 km long and the catchment area is 358 km².

At 11 km from the mouth, the river Yuldybayevo flows into the left bank.

The name of the river came from the Bashkir language. The part эсе means "solonchak", and -ле is a word-formation affix.

The other name of the river is Albayevka (Альбаевка).

== Water registry data ==
According to the Russian State Water Register, the river belongs to the water management of the Bolshoy Ik in the Ural Watershed district.

Code of the object in the State Water Register is 12010000612112200006368.

== In culture ==
The Asselian geochronologic age is named after the river.
