= Assel =

Assel may refer to:

- Assel, Gelderland, a hamlet in the Netherlands
- Assel, Luxembourg, a village in Luxembourg
- Assel River, a river in Russia
