= Tyulgan =

Tyulgan (Russian: Тюльган) may refer to:

- Tyulgan, Chapayevsky Selsoviet, Tyulgansky District, Orenburg Oblast, a station in Chapayevsky Selsoviet
- Tyulgan, Tyulgansky Settlement Council, Tyulgansky District, Orenburg Oblast, a settlement in Tyulgansky Settlement Council
