= Pozdeyev Estate =

- Russian: Усадьба Якова Михайловича Поздеева
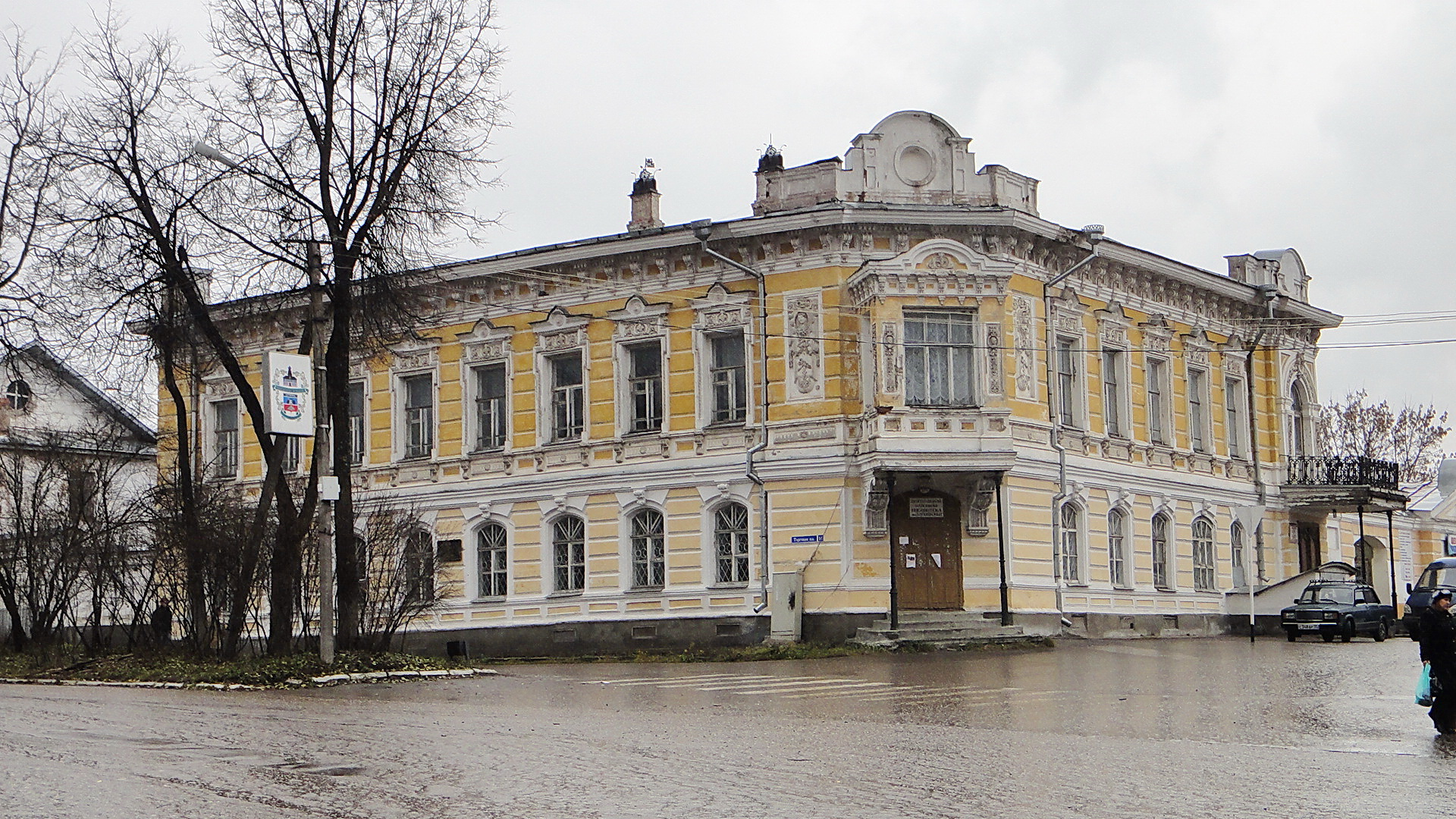
- Main house of the estate
- 58.8432°N 36.4306°E
- Location: Ustyuzhna, Vologda Oblast, Russia
- Material: brick
- Beginning date: 1870s

Yakov Pozdeyev Estate is a complex of residential and administrative buildings located at 14, Torgovaya Square in Uztyuzhna, Vologda Oblast, Russia. The estate is an architectural monument and has status of cultural heritage monument of Russia of federal significance.

Estate was built by one of the richest and most influential citizens of Uztyuzhna — Yakov Mikhaylovich Pozdeyev and was an important community center of town before the Revolution. After 1917 all buildings were expropriated and used to place different cultural institutions. Estate stands out from other buildings in Ustyuzhna with very rich decorations and profuse usage of stucco.

== History ==
The two-story stone mansion with additional buildings was constructed in 1870s by the order of Yakov Mikhaylovich Pozdeev who was a merchant and a head of one of the most influential Uztyuzhna's families of that time. The estate was built by one of the example projects made by capitol's Brick buildings committee. Its first floor was planned for shop and storage rooms, the second one was residential. Pozdeyev house was an important local community center used for local noblemen gatherings and as a guesthouse for different town visitors. For example, John of Kronstadt who was Pozdeyev's penpal, stayed here.

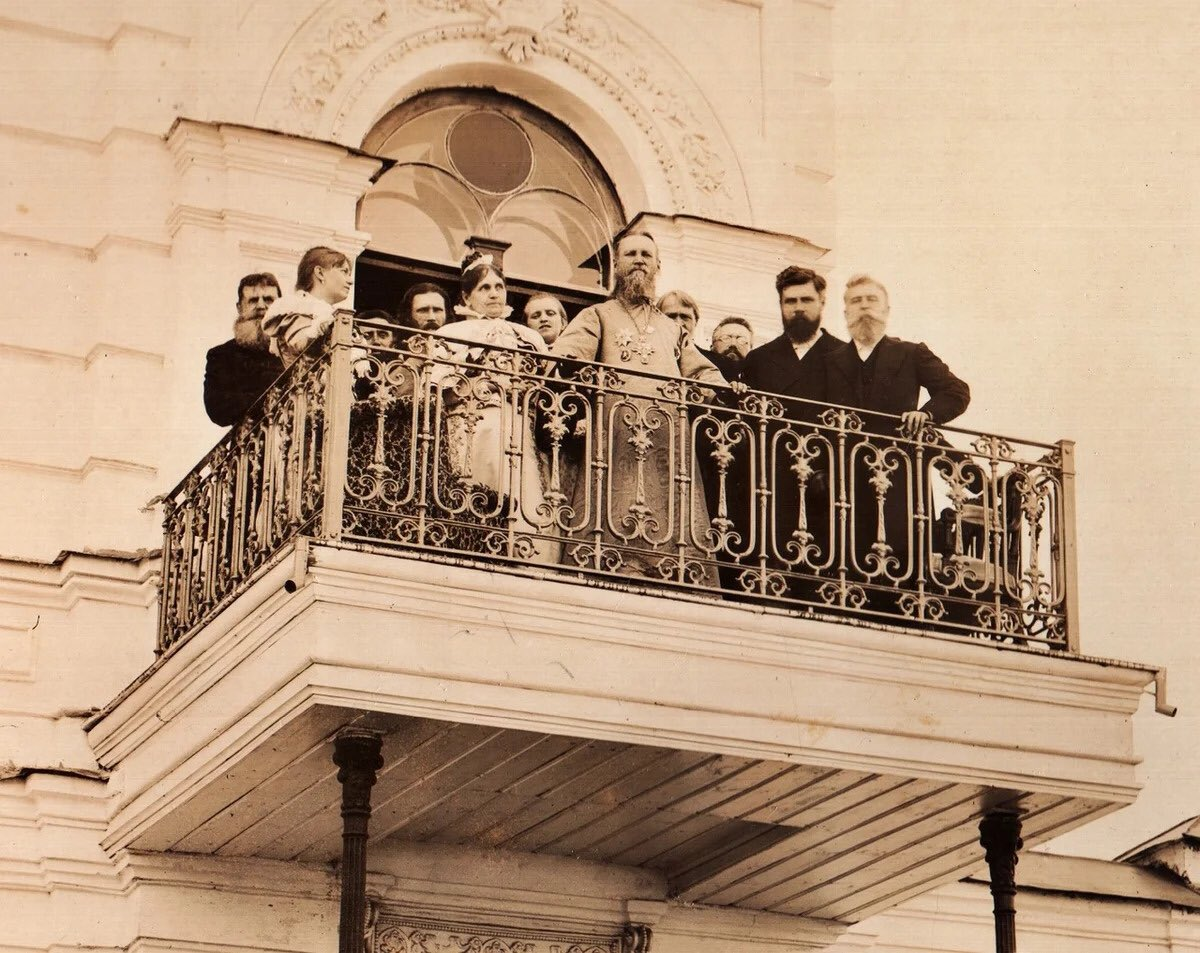
John of Kronstadt is reading a sermon from the mansion balcony standing there with Yakov Pozdeyev family

In 1917, after the October Revolution, the estate was expropriated and all the inhabitants except Yakov Pozdeyev himself were evicted. On November 8th, 1918 a proletarian club was opened there and few days later, on November 24, Yakov Pozdeyev died. The club established a «KIM» cinema that was active in the mansion until November 1935 when it moved into the Resurrection church building.

In 1995 President of Russia ordered to recognize the estate complex — among others historic buildings in Russia — as an architectural monument of federal significance, at the same time Ustyuzhna district's library moved there. In 1998 first marketplace at the Torgovaya Square happened named after Yakov Pozdeev who was also famous with organizing markets. At the same time memorial plate commemorating him was placed on the wall of his former estate. In 2022 Ustyuzhna library named after Batyushkovs was located in the main house, former stables were used in commercial purposes.

== Description ==
Pozdeev estate is located in eastern part of Torgovaya Square and has building number 14 by that square. Estate is opening the square ensemble from the side of Vorozha river bridge and has 2 buildings: main house or mansion and stables. Mansion is faced to the square and stables are faced to Melnichny lane. Estate yard is bordered by stone wall decorated with niches and panelled blades. Building is very decorated: aside of rusticated facades windows and cornices are highlighted with fine artistic stucco, attics and bay window on corbels are connected with parapet made of thin cast iron grate. Mansion interiors are also decorated with stucco.

== Sources ==
- Рыбаков А. А. (1981). Устюжна. Череповец. Вытегра (50000 экз ed.). Л.: Искуство.
- Воротынцева Е. А. (2016). Старинная Устюжна: из истории города и края с древнейших времен до начала XX века. Вологда: Полиграф-периодика.
