= Ufa Belaya River Bridge =

Bridge in Russia

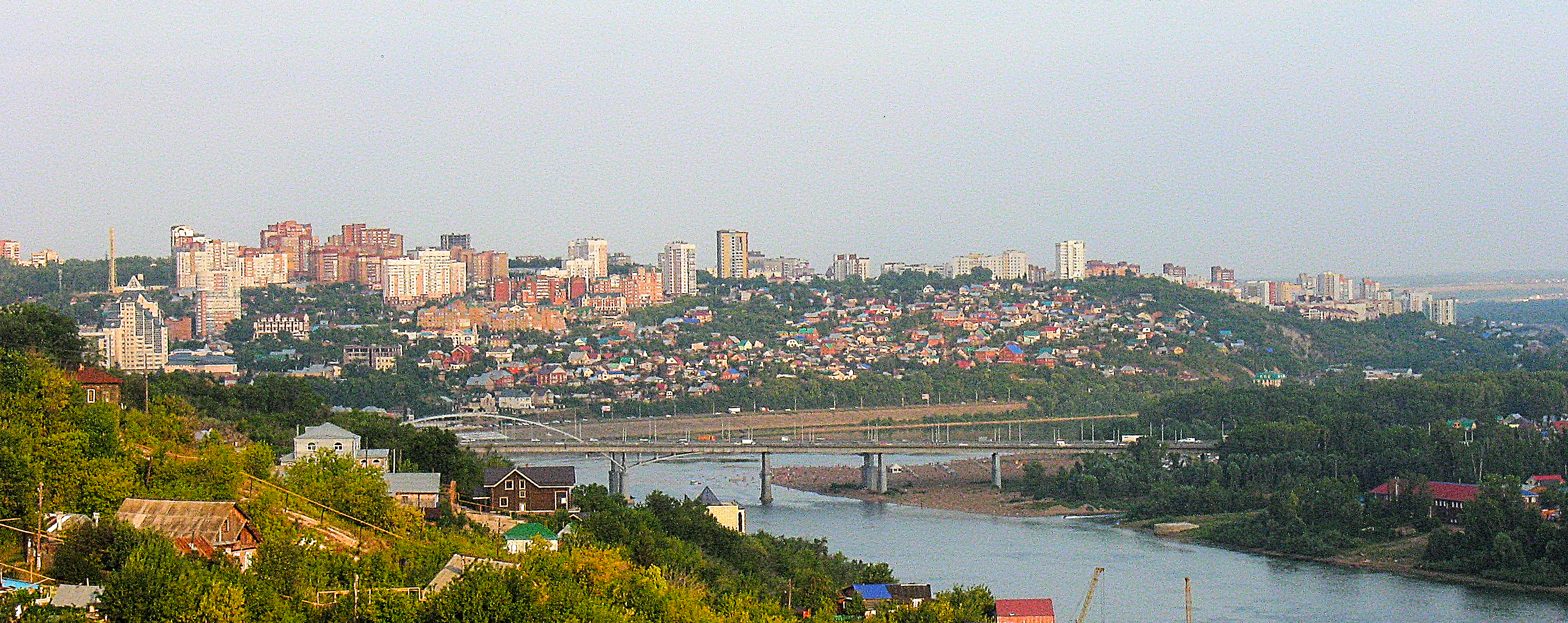
- Panoramic view of Belaya River
- Coordinates: 54.709610°N 55.953577°E
- Carries: General traffic; pedestrian transit
- Crosses: Belaya River
- Locale: Ufa

Characteristics
- Design: Arch bridge
- Material: Reinforced concrete and steel
- Trough construction: Asphalt
- Pier construction: Iron
- No. of lanes: 4 vehicular; 2 pedestrian

History
- Opened: 1956, 1993

The Ufa Belaya River Bridge is a bridge, that carries four lanes of traffic over the Belaya River, between Ufa center and Dema neighbourhood of Ufa, in Bashkortostan.

== History ==
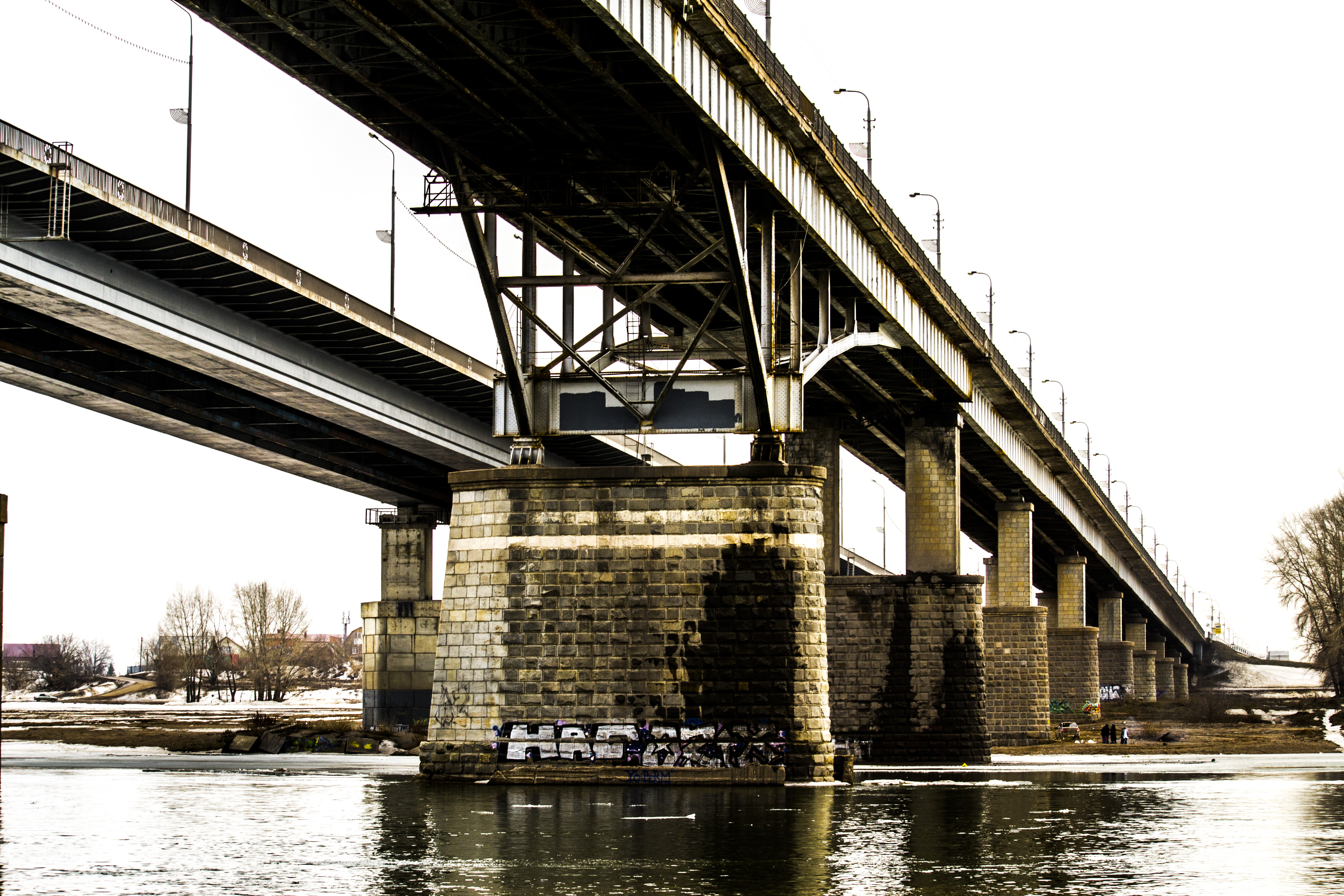

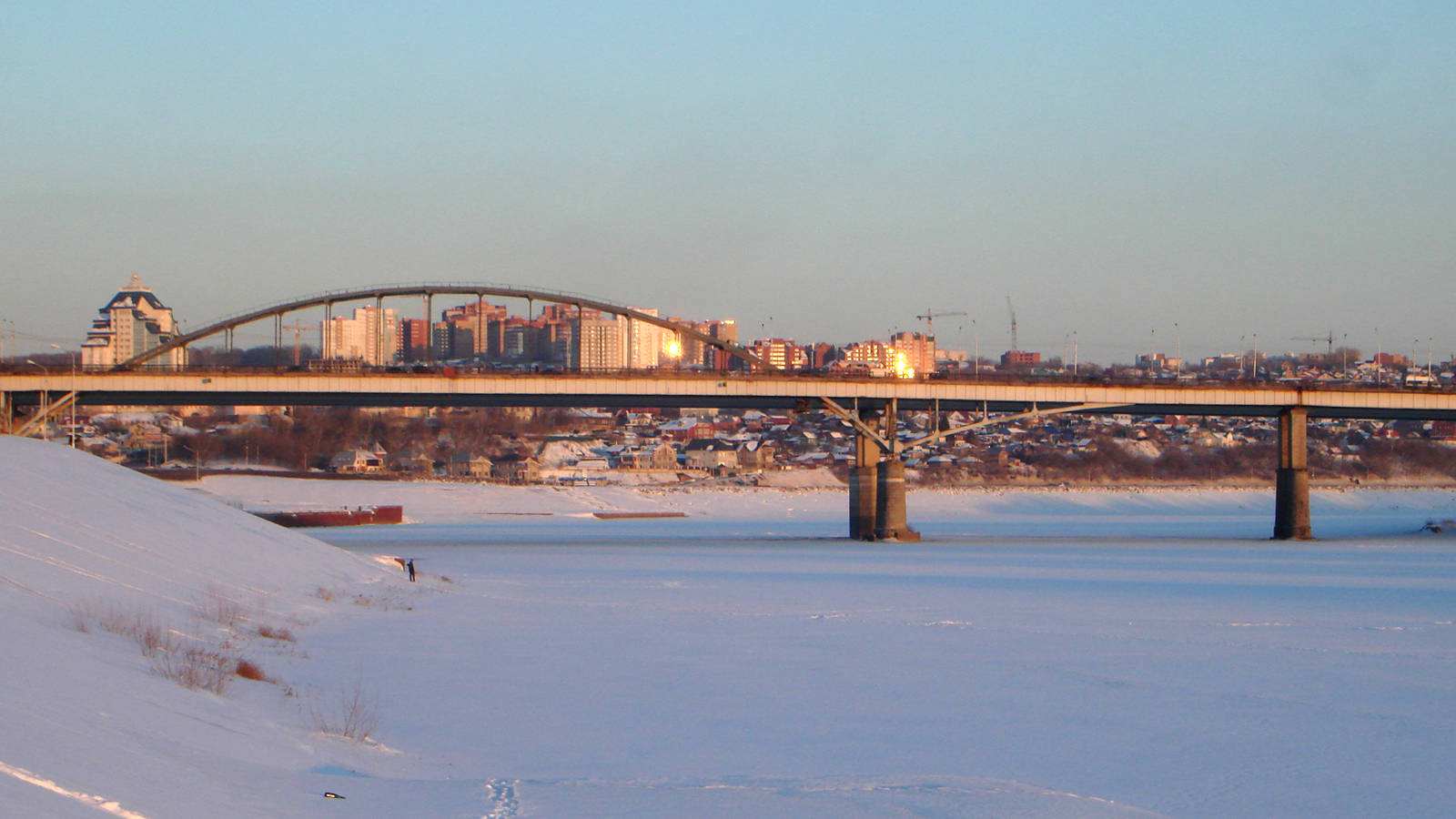
Ufa Belaya River Bridge in winter of 2011

This most in fact consist from two bridges which located near. One of them was built in 1956 and second was built in 1993. In 2018 years regional authorities informed about plan new bridge over the Belaya River in the alignment of Vorovsky Street at the southern exit of Ufa. New bridge by the plan will be located between 1956 bridge and 1993 bridge.
