= Sergey I. Shivtzov =

- Born: 3 October 1874; Wozdwizhenskaya Fortress, Russian Empire
- Died: 17 March 1915 (aged 40); Khotyn, Russian Empire
- Military career
- Allegiance: Russian Empire
- Branch: Imperial Russian Army
- Service years: 1893 to 1915
- Rank: Yesaul
- Conflicts: Russo-Japanese War; World War I
- Awards: Order of St. George

Yesaul Sergey Shivtzov (3 October 1874 – 17 March 1915) was an officer in the Imperial Russian Army who commanded the 1st Squadron of the 1st Orenburg Cossacks Cavalry Regiment during the World War I. He died leading the charge into battle of Khotyn against the Austro-Hungarian Army. Sergey Shivtzov' was the only son of a cavalry officer and Ataman of stanitsa Vozdvízhenskaya Ivan I. Shivtzov, a member of a Shivtzov Family.
