= Shivtzov family (Orenburg) =

The Shivtzov family (Russian: Шивцовы) was the name of noble family of Orenburg Cossacks origin, that also belonged to the Russian nobility.

== History ==
Ivan Ilijich Shivtzov was an Ataman of stanitsa Vozdvízhenskaya and a member of an Orenburg Cossack rada in time of ataman Alexander Dutov revolt against the Soviet authorities in Orenburg Host in 1918.

- Sergey Ivanovich Shivtzov
