= Lukinsky =

Lukinsky Лукинский
- Village
- Location within Bashkortostan Location within Russia
- Coordinates: 54°20′N 56°36′E
- Country: Russia
- Region: Bashkortostan
- District: Arkhangelsky District
- Time zone: UTC+5:00

Lukinsky (Russian: Лукинский) is a rural locality (a village) in Krasnozilimsky Selsoviet, Arkhangelsky District, Bashkortostan, Russia. The population was 14 as of 2010. There are 2 streets.

== Geography ==
Lukinsky is located 17 km southwest of Arkhangelskoye (the district's administrative centre) by road. Akkulevo is the nearest rural locality. Lukinsky lays on the bank of a side stream of the river: ''Zilim''.
