= Nakas (mountain) =

Mountain in Russia

- Накас / Наҡаҫ
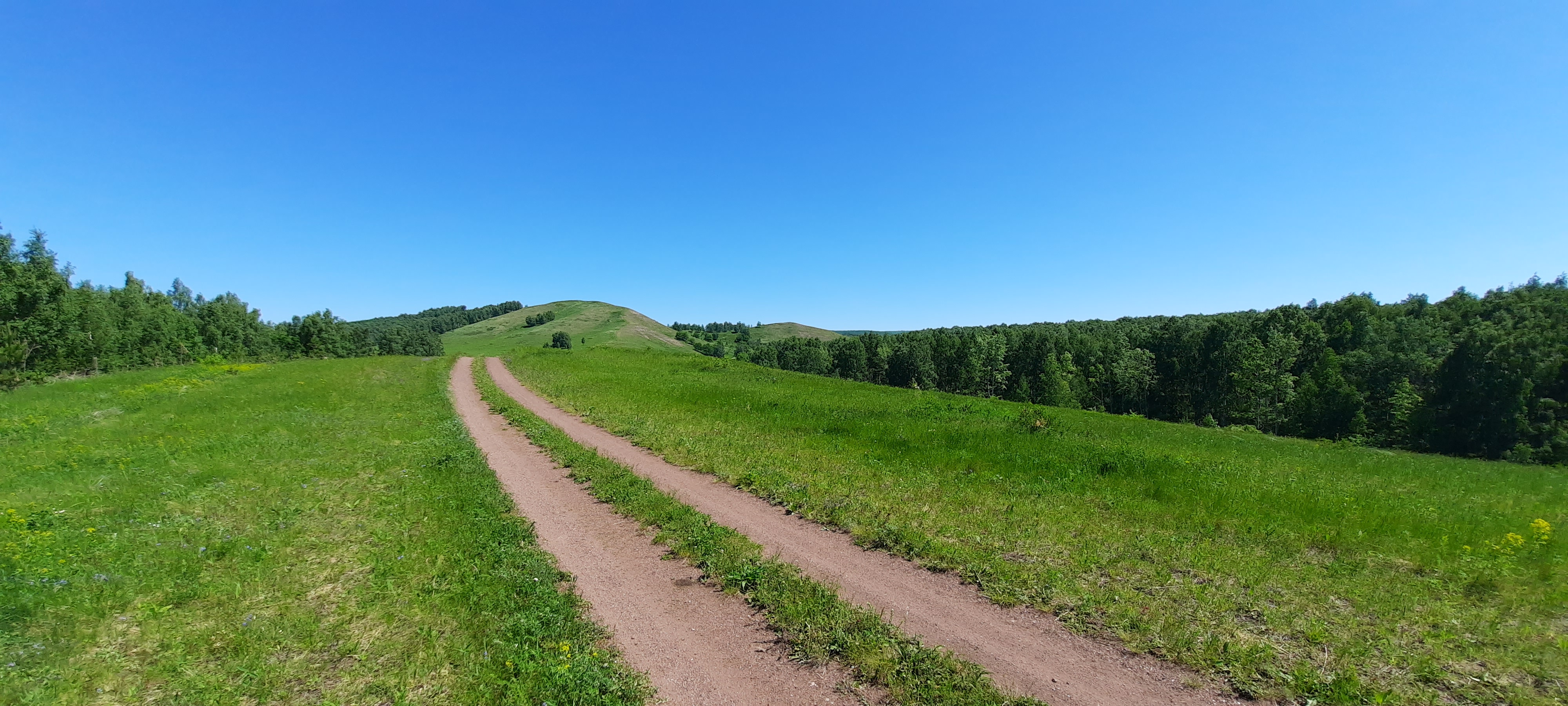
- Landscape of the Nakas

Highest point
- Elevation: 667.6 m (2,190 ft)
- Prominence: 364 m (1,194 ft)
- Coordinates: 52°32′41″N 56°15′27″E

Geography
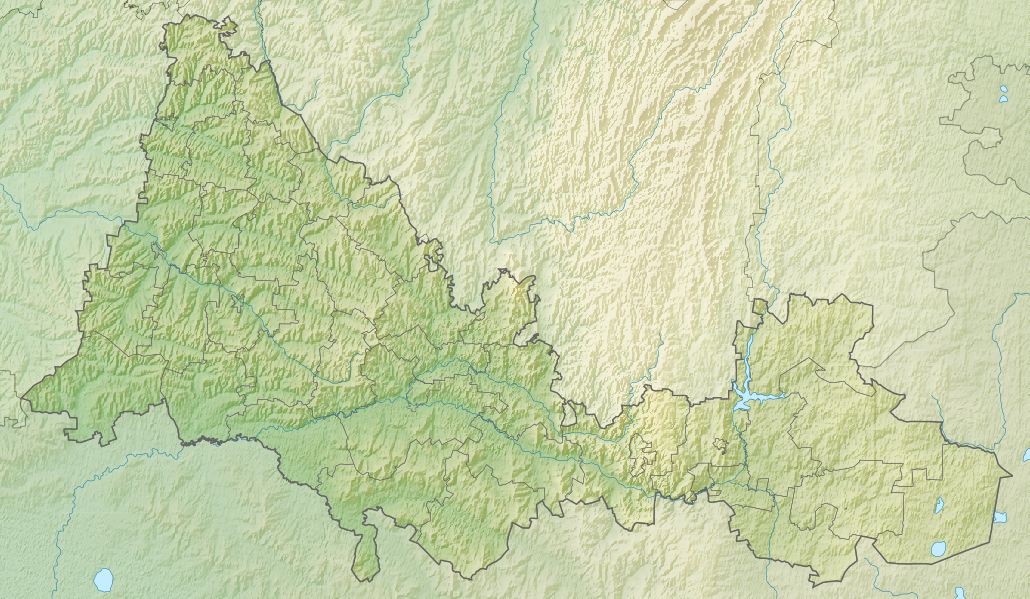
- Location within Orenburg Oblast Location within Russia
- Location: Orenburg Oblast; Russian Federation
- Parent range: Southern Urals, Ural Mountains

Geology
- Rock age(s): Permian, Triassic

Climbing
- Easiest route: From Tyulgan

Nakas (Russian: Накас; Bashkir: Наҡаҫ) also known as Maly Nakas, is a mountain in the Southern Urals, Russian Federation. Its largest part is in Orenburg Oblast, with a small section in Bashkortostan.

== Geography ==
The Nakas rises in northern Tyulgansky District, near the border with Bashkortostan. Rather than a mountain or ridge the Nakas is an elevated area, where its 667.6 m (2,190 ft) high summit —the highest point of Orenburg Oblast— is only a slightly bulging plateau. Despite the lack of pronounced relief the Nakas forms an important drainage divide, separating the basins of the Belaya, Salmysh and Bolshoy Ik rivers.

== Flora ==
Nakas is a relatively woody area; its oak and linden forests stand out in the surrounding steppes of the region. The Nakas includes the Tugustemirov Forest, a protected area with a number of tree and rare plant species.

== See also ==
- List of highest points of Russian federal subjects
- List of mountains and hills of Russia
