= Dyoma (river) =

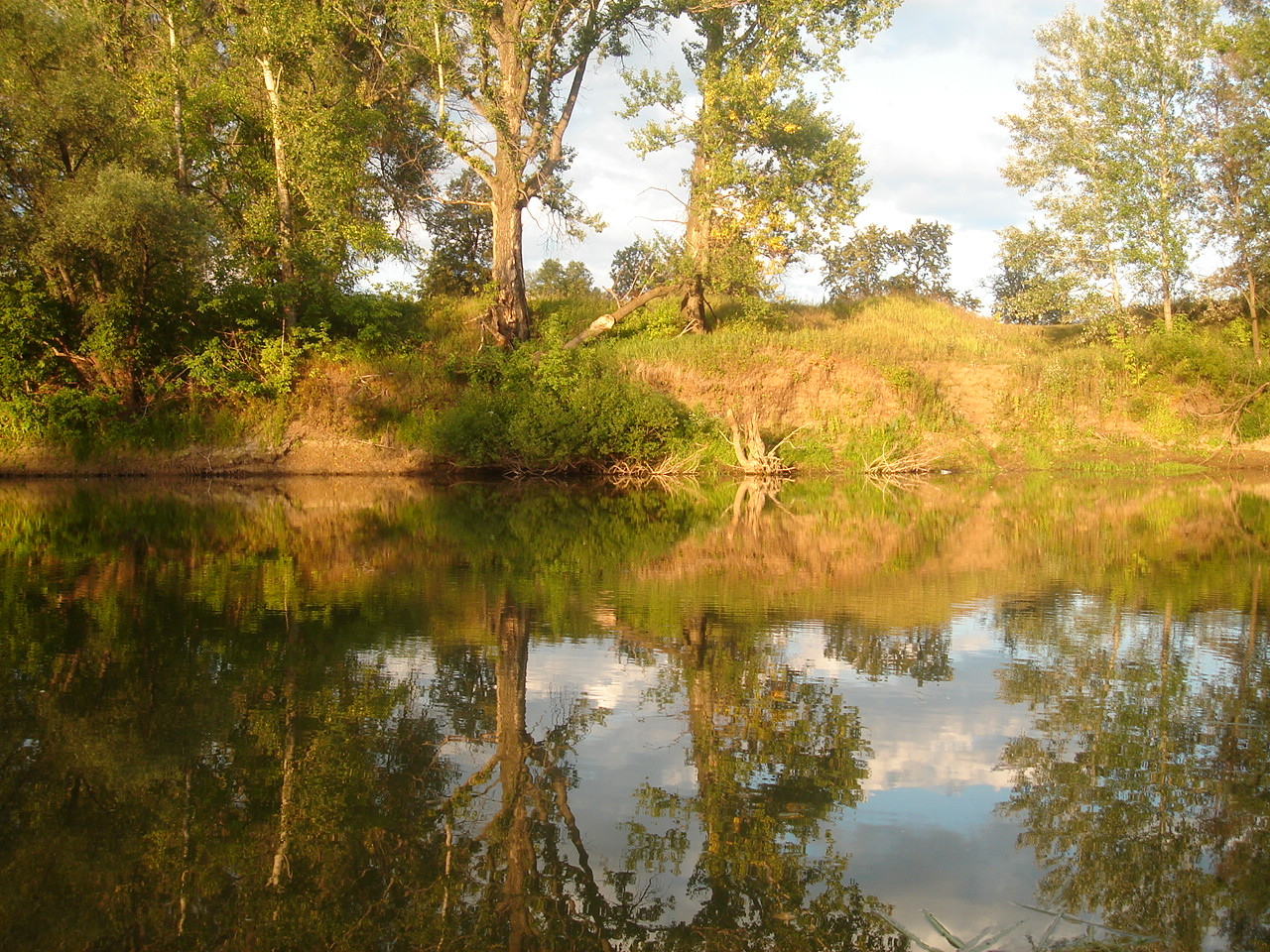
- The Dema at Bochkarevka
- Native name: Дёма (Russian)

Location
- Country: Russia

Physical characteristics
- Mouth: Belaya
  - coordinates: 54°42′50″N 55°54′47″E
- Length: 535 km (332 mi)
- Basin size: 12,800 km^{2} (4,900 sq mi)

Basin features
- Progression: Belaya→ Kama→ Volga→ Caspian Sea

The Dyoma (Bashkir: Дим, Dim, also Күгиҙел, Kügiźel; Russian: Дёма) is a river in the Republic of Bashkortostan, Russia. It flows north and joins the Belaya from the left bank at Ufa, the capital and largest city of Bashkortostan. The river is 535 km (332 mi) long, with a drainage basin of 12,800 km^{2} (4,900 mi^{2}). Its average discharge is 35 cubic metres per second (1,200 cu ft/s).

The Dyoma has its sources on the northern slopes of the Obshchy Syrt plateau at the border of Orenburg Oblast north of the south-flowing Salmysh branch of the Sakmara River. From there, it flows towards the northeast into Bashkortostan, where it forms a wide valley. Here, the river runs slowly, and is heavily meandering, particularly in its lower reaches before its confluence with the Belaya.

The town of Davlekanovo lies at the Dyoma, and the river's mouth is within the boundaries of the city of Ufa, in the township of Dyoma, named after the river.
