= Vorozha =

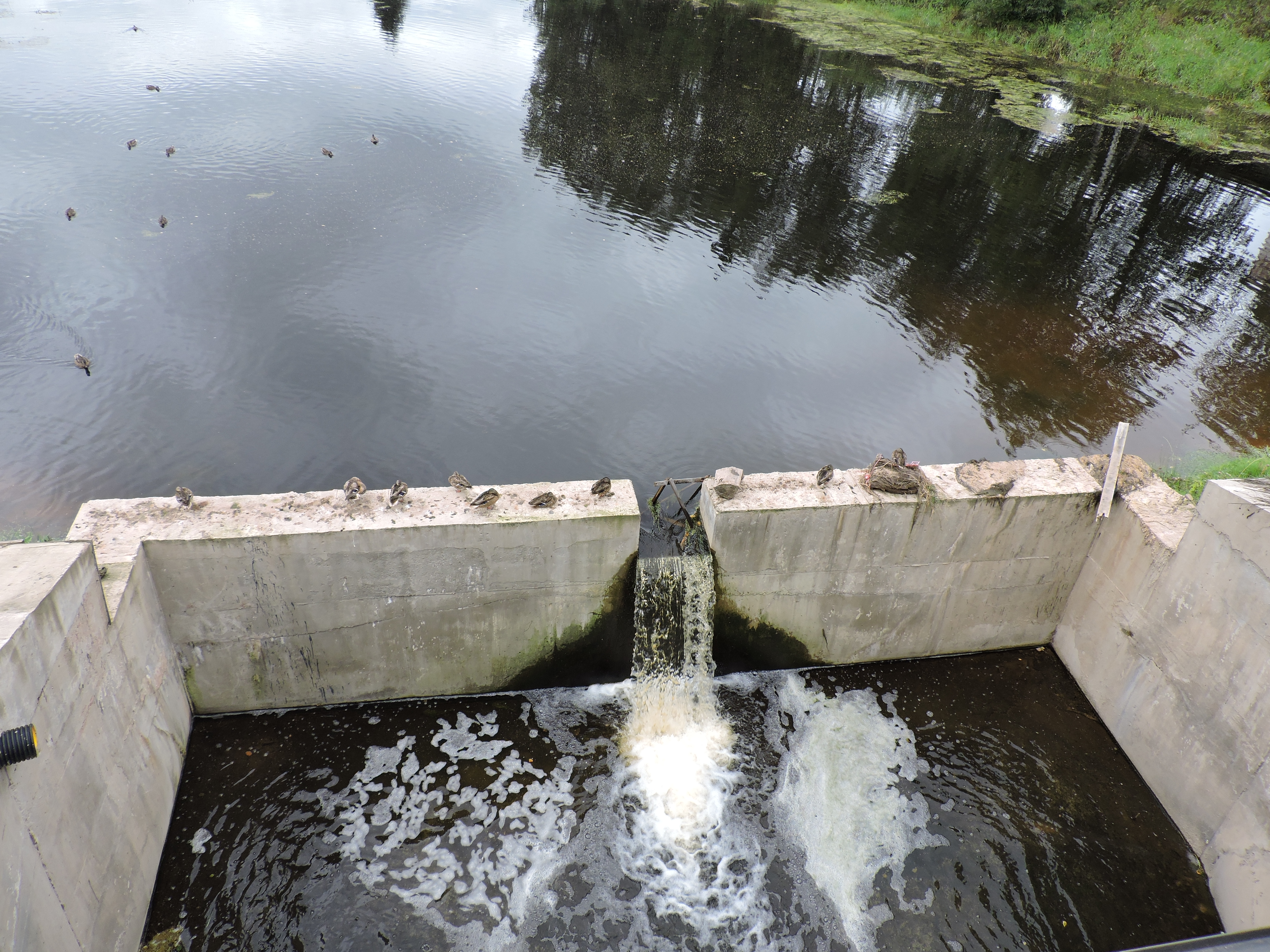
- Dam-bridge across Vorozha River
- Native name: Ворожа (Russian)

Location
- Country: Russia

Physical characteristics
- Source
  - location: Okunevo at the south of Osinovik village
  - coordinates: 58.7758°N 36.4803°E
- Mouth: Mologa
  - location: Ustyuzhna
  - coordinates: 58.8452°N 36.4361°E
- Length: 12 km (7.5 mi)

Basin features
- Progression: Mologa/Rybinsk Reservoir/Volga/Caspian Sea

Vorozha (Russian: Ворожа) is a river in Ustyuzhensky District in Vologda Oblast Russia. It is a right tributary of Mologa River.

According to the State Water Register of Russia, it belongs to the Upper Volga Basin District (Rivers of the Rybinsk reservoir basin). The river basin of the river is the (Upper) Volga to the Kuibyshev reservoir (without the Oka basin)..

It starts 2 km east of Obukhovo village. Than flows to the north, leaving the Torsheevo village at the right hand. After about 5 km it turns and flows west for about 3 km, leaving the villages of Ramenye and Chesalovo on the right, and Voronino and Aristovo on the left. Than, turning to the north and northeast again it reaches the center of Ustyuzhna and flows into the Mologa River (about 82 km from its mouth). The place of Vorozha and Mologa confluence significantly influences the urban ensemble Ustyuzhna. Thus the reservoir on the river separates the Torgovaya and Sobornaya squares. These form the planning kernel of the whole city.

The length of the river is 12 km. The natural watercourse has been significantly changed by melioration.

Object code in State Water Register: 08010200112110000006672

== Literature ==
- Рыбаков, А. А. (1981). "Устюжна". Устюжна. Череповец. Вытегра (50000 экз ed.). Л: Искусство.
