= Tyulgansky District =

Tyulgansky District Тюльганский район (Russian)
- District
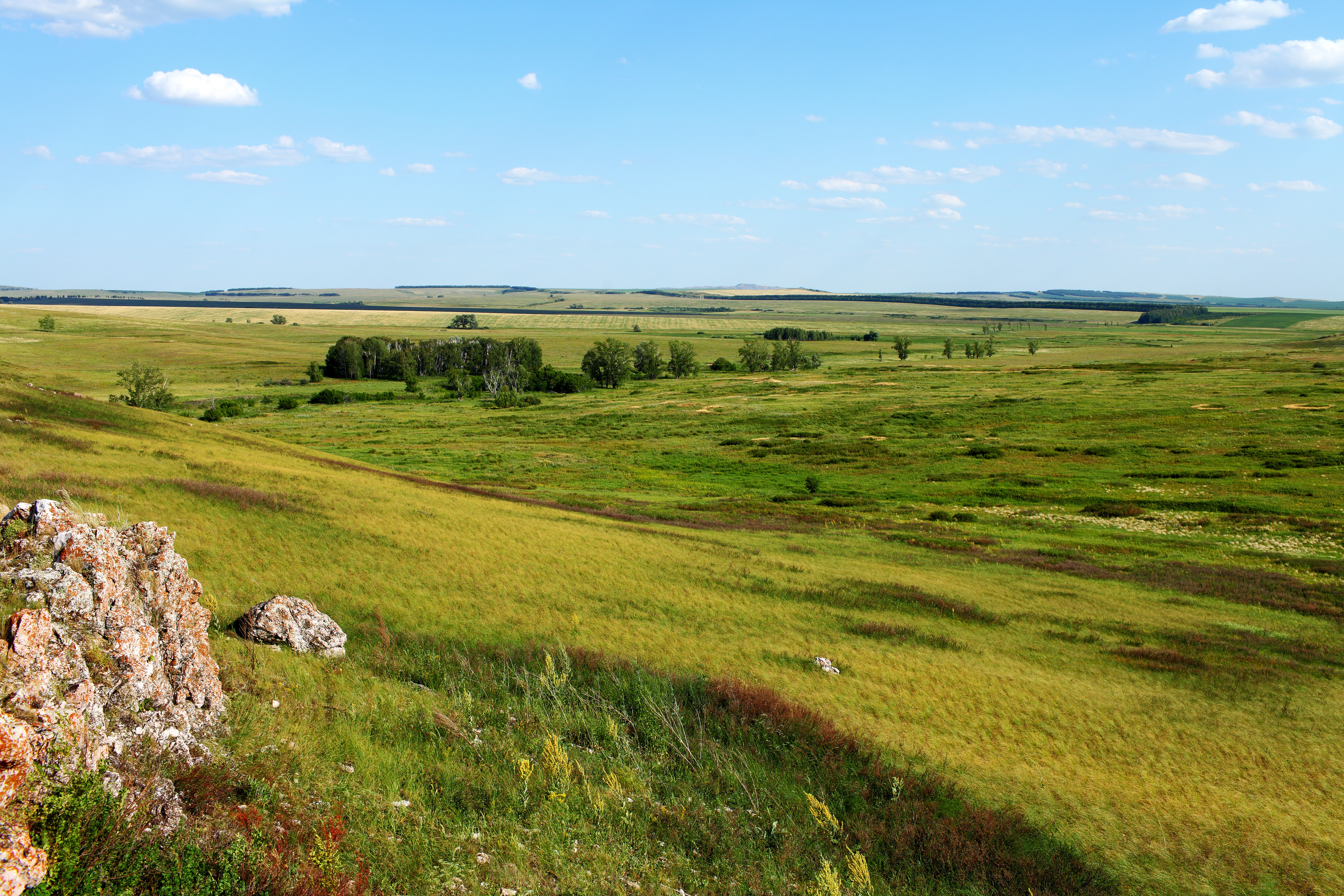
- Blue Tract Stones in Tyulgansky District

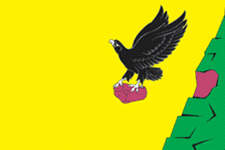
- Flag Coat of arms
- Location of Tyulgansky District in Orenburg Oblast
- Coordinates: 52°20′37″N 56°09′15″E
- Country: Russia
- Federal subject: Orenburg Oblast
- Established: 11 January 1965
- Administrative center: Tyulgan

Area
  - Total: 1,887 km^{2} (729 sq mi)

Population (2010 Census)
  - Total: 19,725
  - Density: 10.45/km^{2} (27.07/sq mi)
  - Urban: 0%
  - Rural: 100%

Administrative structure
  - Administrative divisions: 14 Selsoviets, 1 Settlement councils
  - Inhabited localities: 42 rural localities

Municipal structure
  - Municipally incorporated as: Tyulgansky Municipal District
  - Municipal divisions: 0 urban settlements, 14 rural settlements
- Time zone: UTC+5 (MSK+2)
- OKTMO ID: 53653000
- Website: http://mo-tu.orb.ru

Population of Tyulgansky District
- 2010 Census: 19,725
- 2002 Census: 23,627
- 1989 Census: 23,871
- 1979 Census: 20,369

Tyulgansky District (Russian: Тюльга́нский райо́н) is an administrative and municipal district (raion), one of the thirty-five in Orenburg Oblast, Russia. The area of the district is 1,887 square kilometers (729 sq mi). Its administrative center is the rural locality (a settlement) of Tyulgan. As of the 2010 Census, the total population of the district was 19,725, with the population of Tyulgan accounting for 45.4% of that number.

== Geography ==
Orenburg Oblast's highest point, 668 m (2,192 ft) high Nakas, is located in the northeastern part of the district.
