= Torgovaya Square =

Central urban square of Ustyuzhna, Vologda Oblast, Russia

Coordinates: 58.842796°N 36.428742°E

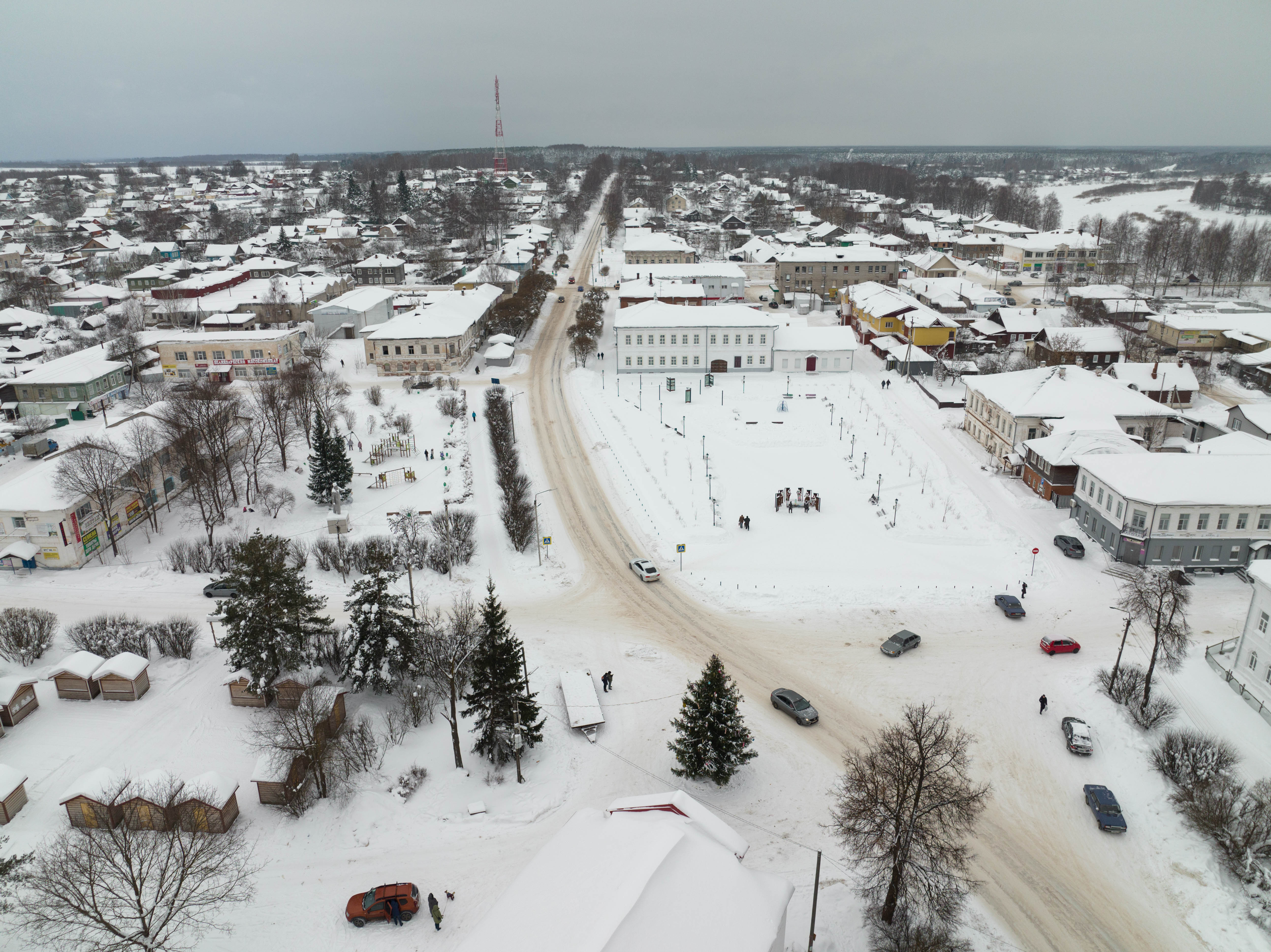
Torgovaya Square - a view from Vorozha River

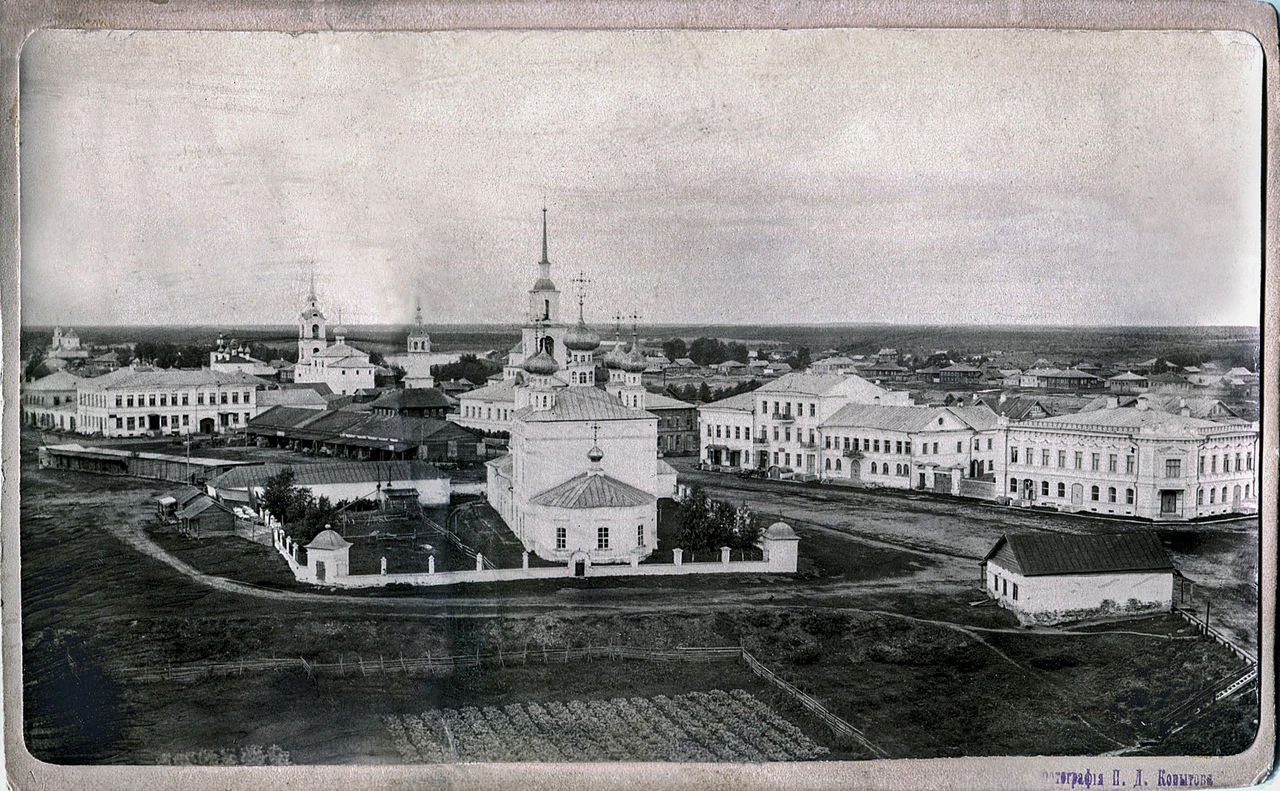
At the beginning of XX century

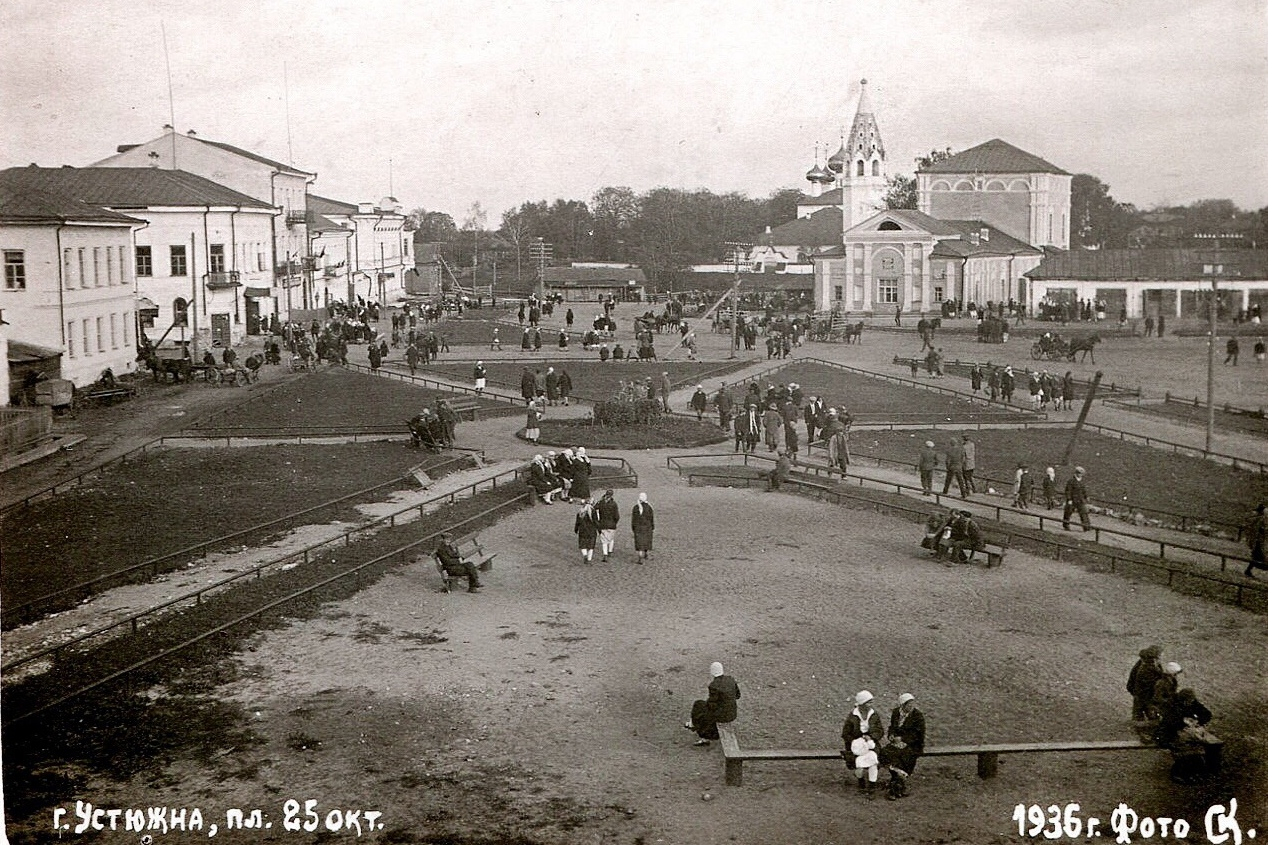
In 1936

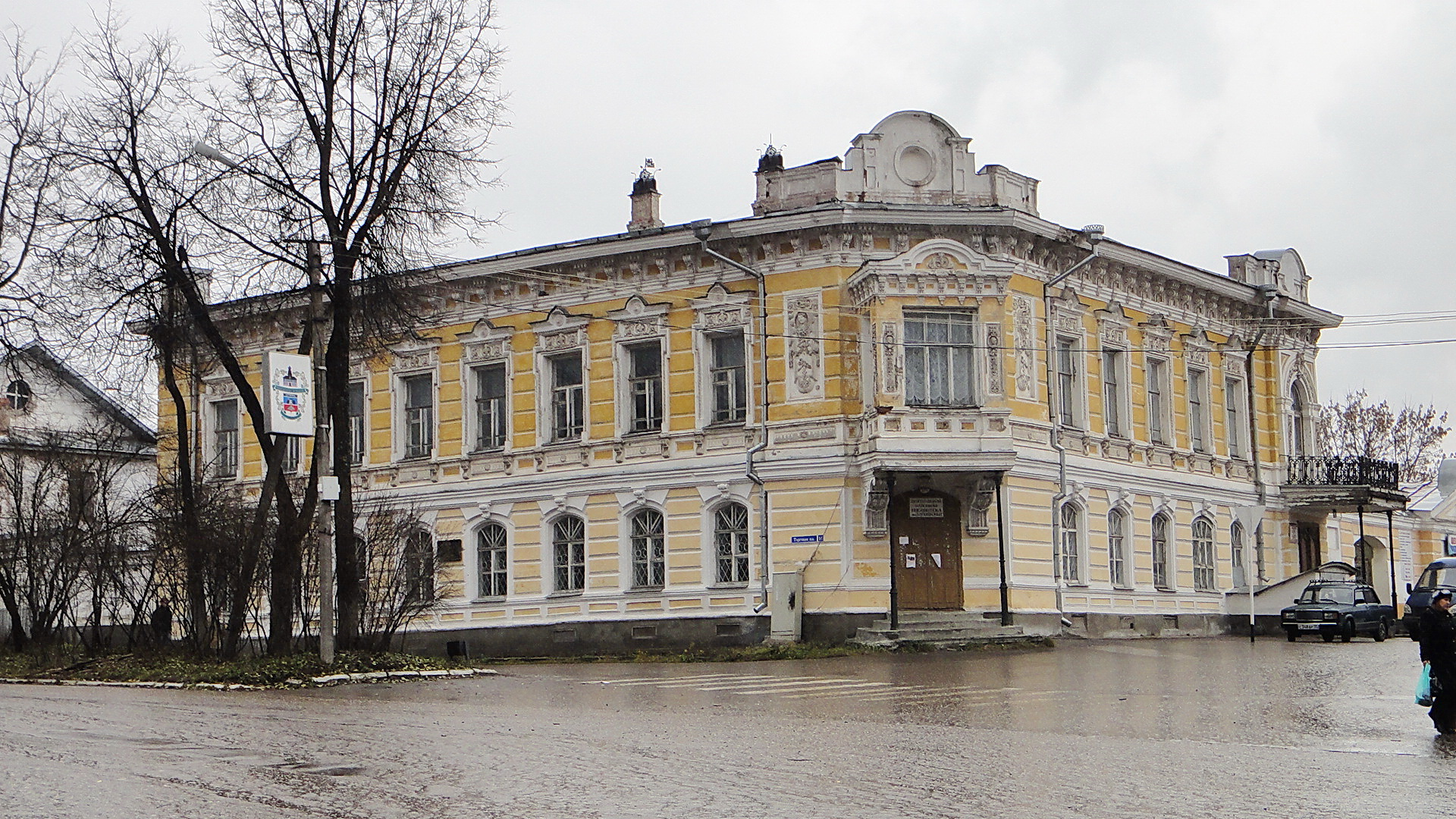
Pozdeyev Estate located on the square

Torgovaya square is the central square of the Russian town of Ustyuzhna in Vologda Oblast. The square had appeared in the XVI-th century and since then was the center of the social and economic life of the city. In 1778 it was redeveloped according to the architectural plans of the Catherine II's commission and received a modern form. The building of the square was formed later — from the XIX-th to early XX-th centuries. Annual Trade fairs are held at the square.

Torgovaya square is located in the center of Ustyuzhna, on the right bank of Mologa river, at the intersection of Lenin Street and Korelyakova Lane. It is rectangular in plan, stretching from west to east. The size of the square is 210 x 140 meters.

From the east, the area is bounded by Vorozha River's pond, which separates Torgovaya Square from the Sobornaya one. Together these squares form the planning kernel of the whole city. The buildings are located on all other sides along the setback lines.

== Literature ==
- Рыбаков, А. А. (1981). "Устюжна". Устюжна. Череповец. Вытегра (50000 экз ed.). Л: Искусство.
- Воротынцева Е. А. (2016). Старинная Устюжна: из истории города и края с древнейших времен до начала XX века (500 экз ed.). Вологда: Полиграф-Периодика. ISBN 978-5-91965-148-2.
