= Syun =

Location
- Country: Russia
- Republics: Bashkortostan and Tatarstan

Physical characteristics
- Source
  - location: Bashkortostan
- Mouth: Belaya
  - coordinates: 55°43′11″N 54°16′37″E
- Length: 209 km (130 mi)
- Basin size: 4,500 km^{2} (1,700 sq mi)
- Discharge
  - average: 14.8 m^{3}/s (520 cu ft/s)

Basin features
- Progression: Belaya→ Kama→ Volga→ Caspian Sea

The Syun (Bashkir: Сөн, Sön; Russian: Сюнь; Tatar: Сөн, Sön) is a river in Bashkortostan and Tatarstan, Russian Federation, a left-bank tributary of the Belaya (Kama basin). It is 209 kilometres (130 mi) long, of which 74 kilometres (46 mi) are in Tatarstan. Its drainage basin covers 4,500 square kilometres (1,700 mi^{2}). Major tributaries in Tatarstan are the Kalmiya, Sikiya, Terpelya, Bezyada, and Sharan in Bashkortostan. The maximal water discharge is 655 cubic metres per second (23,100 cu ft/s) (1979), and the maximal mineralization 500 to 1000 mg/L. Average sediment at the mouth per year is 120 millimetres (4.7 in). Drainage is regulated. Since 1978 it is protected as a "natural monument of Tatarstan".
