= Saraktash =

Rural locality in Orenburg Oblast, Russia

Saraktash Саракташ
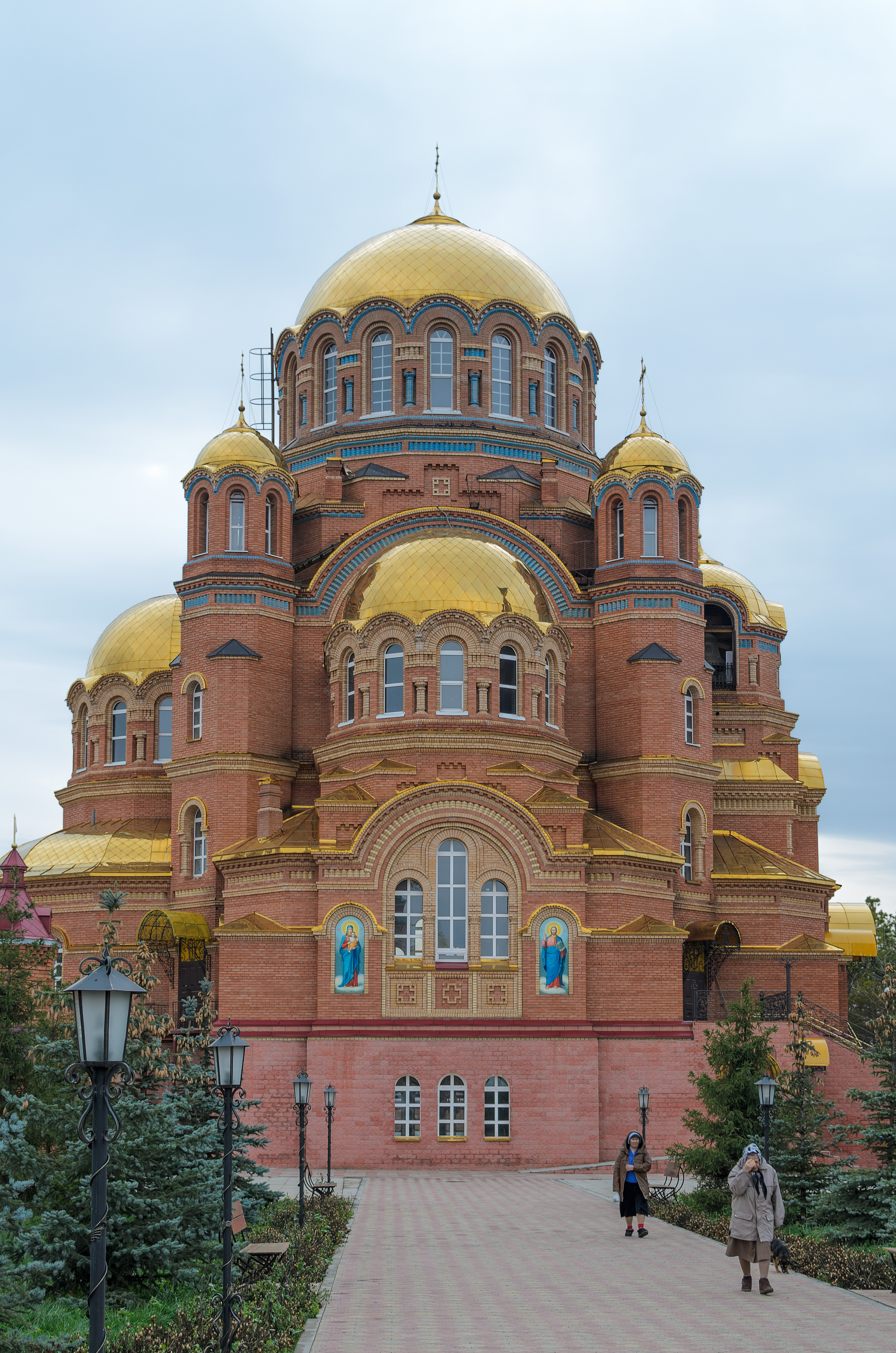
- Monastery of the Holy Trinity

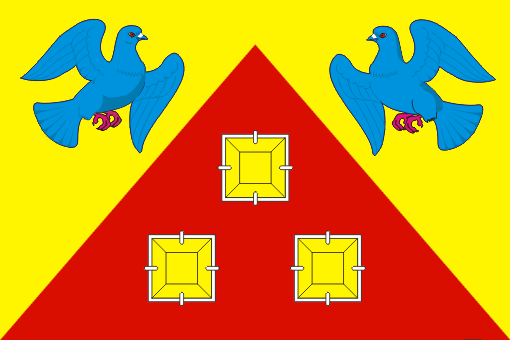
- Flag
- Interactive map of Saraktash
- Location of Saraktash Saraktash (European Russia) Saraktash (Russia)
- Coordinates: 51°47′13″N 56°21′23″E
- Country: Russia
- Federal subject: Orenburg Oblast

Population
  - Estimate (2025): 18,429 )
- Time zone: UTC+5 (MSK+2)
- Postal code: 462100
- OKTMO ID: 53641444101

Saraktash (Russian: Саракташ) is a rural locality (a settlement) and the administrative center of Saraktashsky District, Orenburg Oblast, Russia.

It is near Saraktash that the Sakmara river receives its tributary the Bolshoy Ik River.

Population: 17,235 (2010 census); 17,510 (2002 census); 16,250 (1989 Soviet census).
