= Saraktashsky District =

Saraktashsky District Саракташский район (Russian)
- District
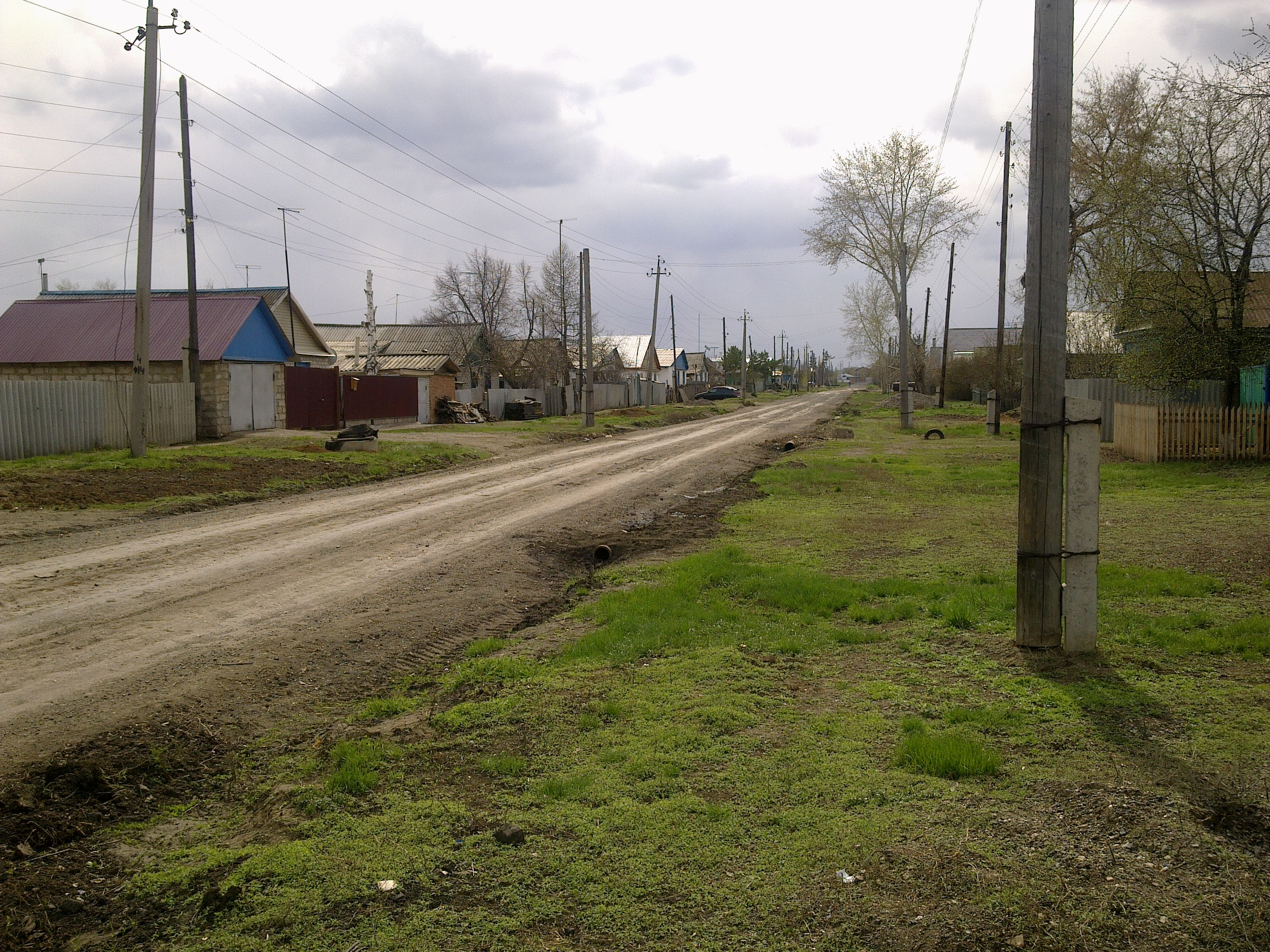
- In Saraktash, the administrative center of Saraktashsky District

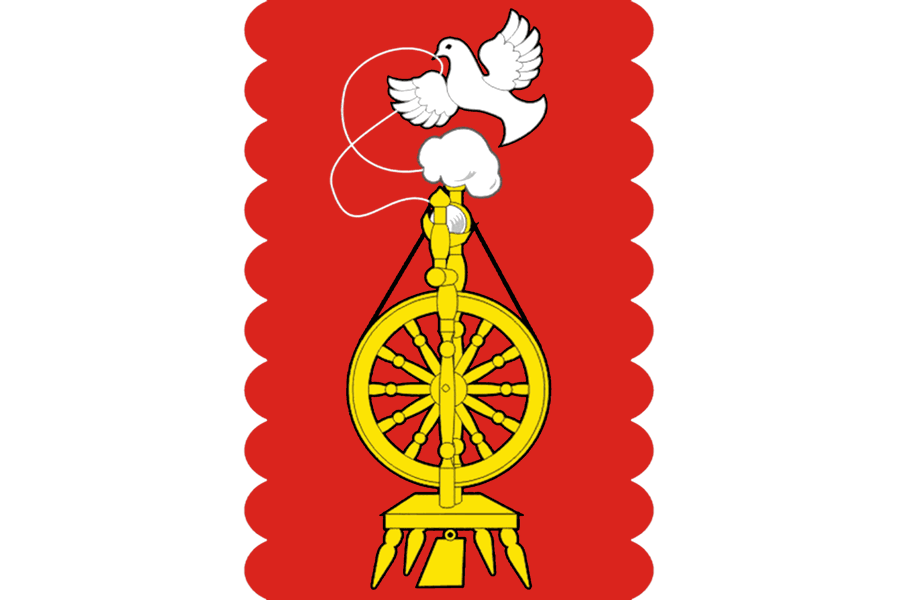
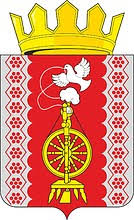
- Flag Coat of arms
- Location of Saraktashsky District in Orenburg Oblast
- Coordinates: 51°54′N 56°24′E
- Country: Russia
- Federal subject: Orenburg Oblast
- Established: 4 January 1931
- Administrative center: Saraktash

Area
  - Total: 3,600 km^{2} (1,400 sq mi)

Population (2010 Census)
  - Total: 40,145
  - Density: 11/km^{2} (29/sq mi)
  - Urban: 0%
  - Rural: 100%

Administrative structure
  - Administrative divisions: 19 Selsoviets, 1 Settlement councils
  - Inhabited localities: 77 rural localities

Municipal structure
  - Municipally incorporated as: Saraktashsky Municipal District
  - Municipal divisions: 0 urban settlements, 19 rural settlements
- Time zone: UTC+5 (MSK+2)
- OKTMO ID: 53641000
- Website: http://www.area-sar.ru

Saraktashsky District (Russian: Саракташский райо́н) is an administrative and municipal district (raion), one of the thirty-five in Orenburg Oblast, Russia. It is located in the northeast of the oblast. The area of the district is 3,600 square kilometers (1,400 sq mi). Its administrative center is the rural locality (a settlement) of Saraktash. Population: 40,145 (2010 Census); 42,307 (2002 census); 40,887 (1989 Soviet census). The population of Saraktash accounts for 42.9% of the total district's population.
