= Amur watershed district =

Watershed district of Russia

Coordinates: 51°N 135°E

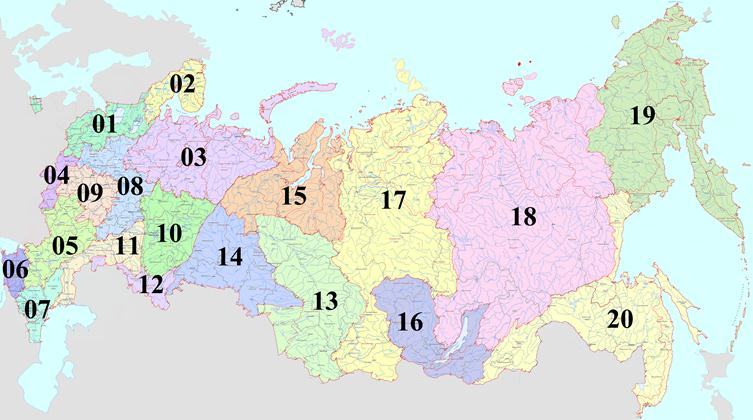
Map (01 - Baltic, 02 - Barents–Belomor, 03 - Dvina–Pechora, 04 - Dnieper, 05 - Don, 06 - Kuban, 07 - Western Caspian, 08 - Upper Volga, 09 - Oka, 10 - Kama, 11 - Lower Volga, 12 - Ural, 13 - Upper Ob, 14 - Irtysh, 15 - Lower Ob, 16 - Angara–Baikal, 17 - Yenisey, 18 - Lena, 19 - Anadyr–Kolyma, 20 - Amur). See also a detailed map

The Amur watershed district (Russian: Амурский бассейновый округ) is a watershed district of Russia, as defined by the Water Code of the Russian Federation with the code number 20.).

== Structure ==
- 20.01 - Drainage basins of the Sea of Okhotsk from Suntar-Khayata Range to Uda river basin
- 20.02 - Uda river basin
- 20.03 - Amur river basin
- 20.04 - Drainage basins of the Sea of Japan
- 20.05 - Drainage basins of Sakhalin and Kuril Islands

In the north it borders with the subdistrict 19.10 " Drainage basins of the Sea of Okhotsk from Penzhina to Suntar-Khayata Range" of the Anadyr-Kolyma watershed district.

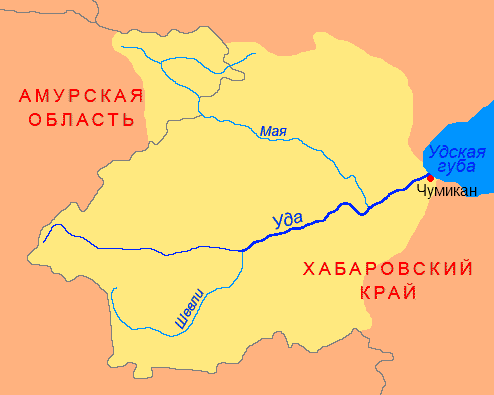
20.02: Uda river basin

20:03 Amur river basin
