= Belaya (Kama) =

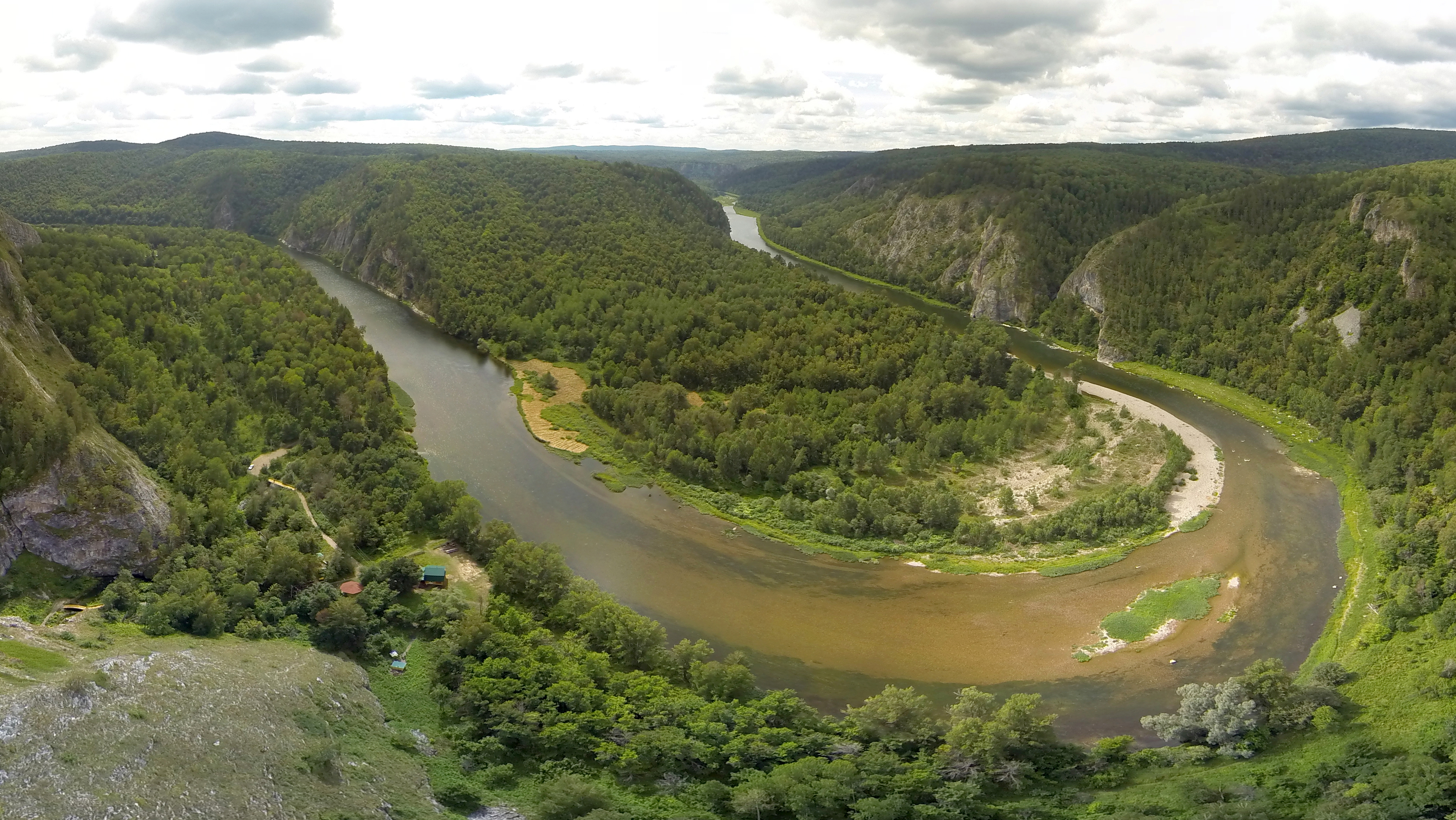
- The Belaya near Shulgan-Tash Cave

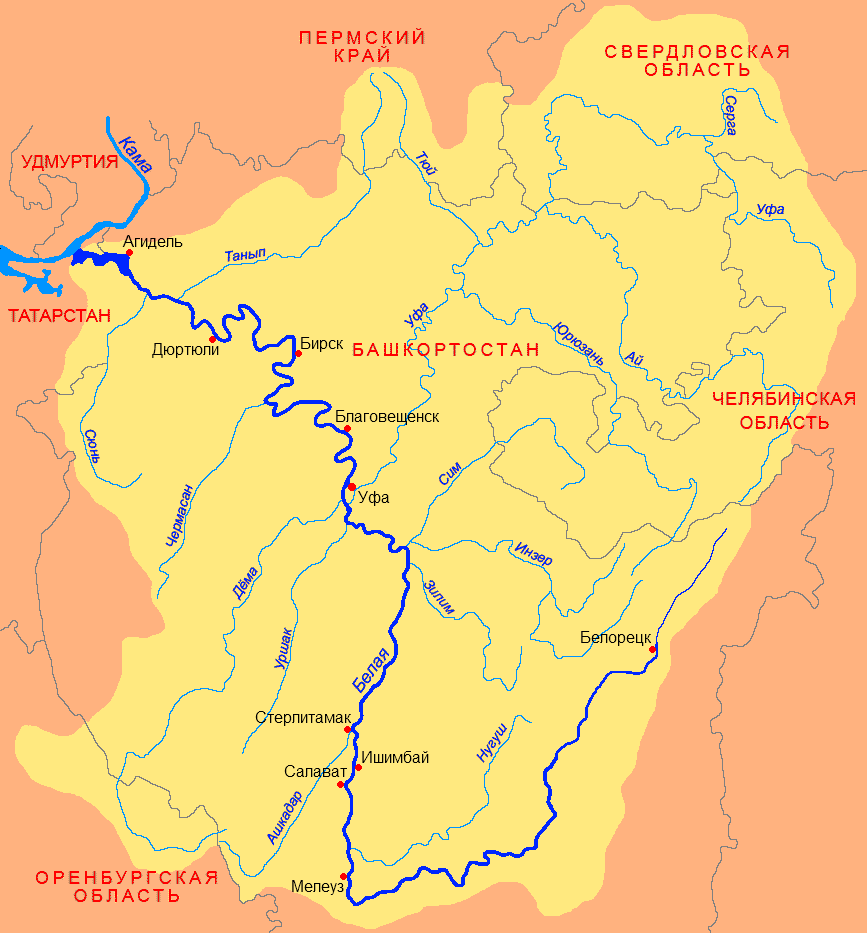
- Belaya basin

- Location within European Russia

Location
- Country: Russia
- Region: Bashkortostan

Physical characteristics
- Source: Iremel mountains
  - location: Novokhusainovo, Uchalinsky District
  - coordinates: 54°33′0″N 59°3′0″E
  - elevation: 749 m (2,457 ft)
- Mouth: Kama
  - location: Nizhnekamsk Reservoir
  - coordinates: 55°53′14″N 53°36′14″E
  - elevation: 57 m (187 ft)
- Length: 1,430 km (890 mi)
- Basin size: 142,000 km^{2} (55,000 sq mi)
- Discharge
  - average: 858 m^{3}/s (30,300 cu ft/s) (near Birsk)

Basin features
- Progression: Kama→ Volga→ Caspian Sea

The Belaya (/ˈbɛlaɪə/ BEL-y-ə) (Note: Russian: Белая, romanized: Belaja, IPA: [ˈbʲeɫəjə]; lit. 'white (f.)'; Bashkir: Ағиҙел, romanized: Ağiźel, IPA: [ɑʁe̝ˈðɪ̞l]; Tatar: Агыйдел, romanized: Ağıydel, IPA: [ɒʁɯɪˈdel]) is a river in Bashkortostan, Russia. Its source lies in the south-western Ural Mountains.

It is 1,430 kilometres (890 mi) long, and its drainage basin covers 142,000 square kilometres (55,000 mi^{2}).

Settlements along the Belaya include Beloretsk, Sterlitamak, Ufa (at the confluence with the river Ufa), and Birsk. The Belaya flows into the Kama near Neftekamsk.

== Tributaries ==
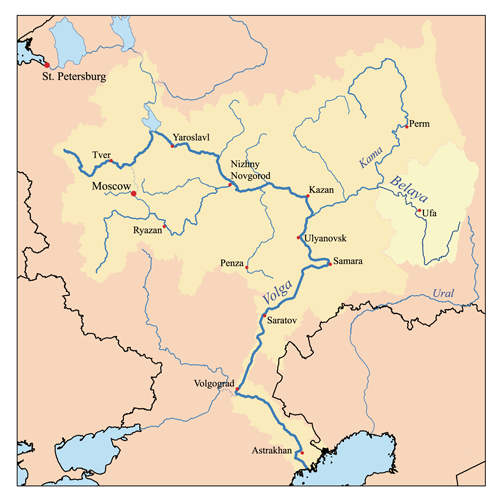
Map of the Volga watershed with the Belaya highlighted

The largest tributaries of the Belaya are, from source to mouth:

- Tirlyan (right)
- Nugush (right)
- Ashkadar (left)
- Kuganak (left)
- Zigan (right)
- Zilim (right)
- Sim (right)
- Urshak (left)
- Ufa (right)
- Dyoma (left)
- Chermasan (left)
- Bir (right)
- Bystry Tanyp (right)
- Baza (left)
- Syun (left)

== See also ==
- List of rivers of Russia
- Nakas (mountain)

== Gallery ==
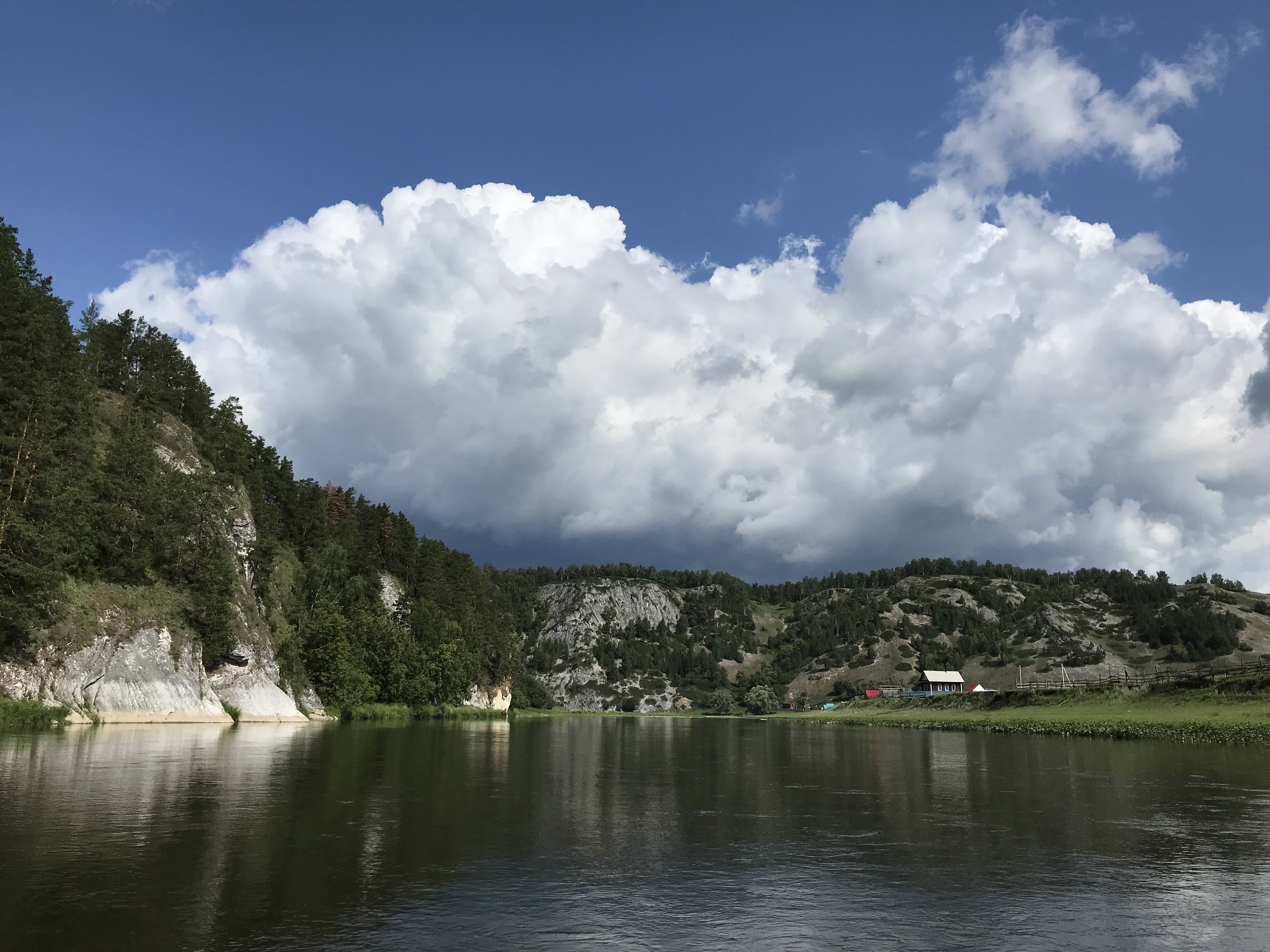
The middle Belaya valley

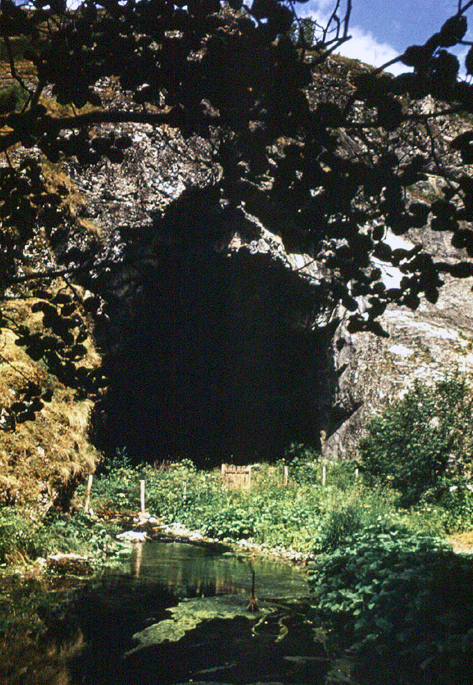
The entrance to the Kapova Cave

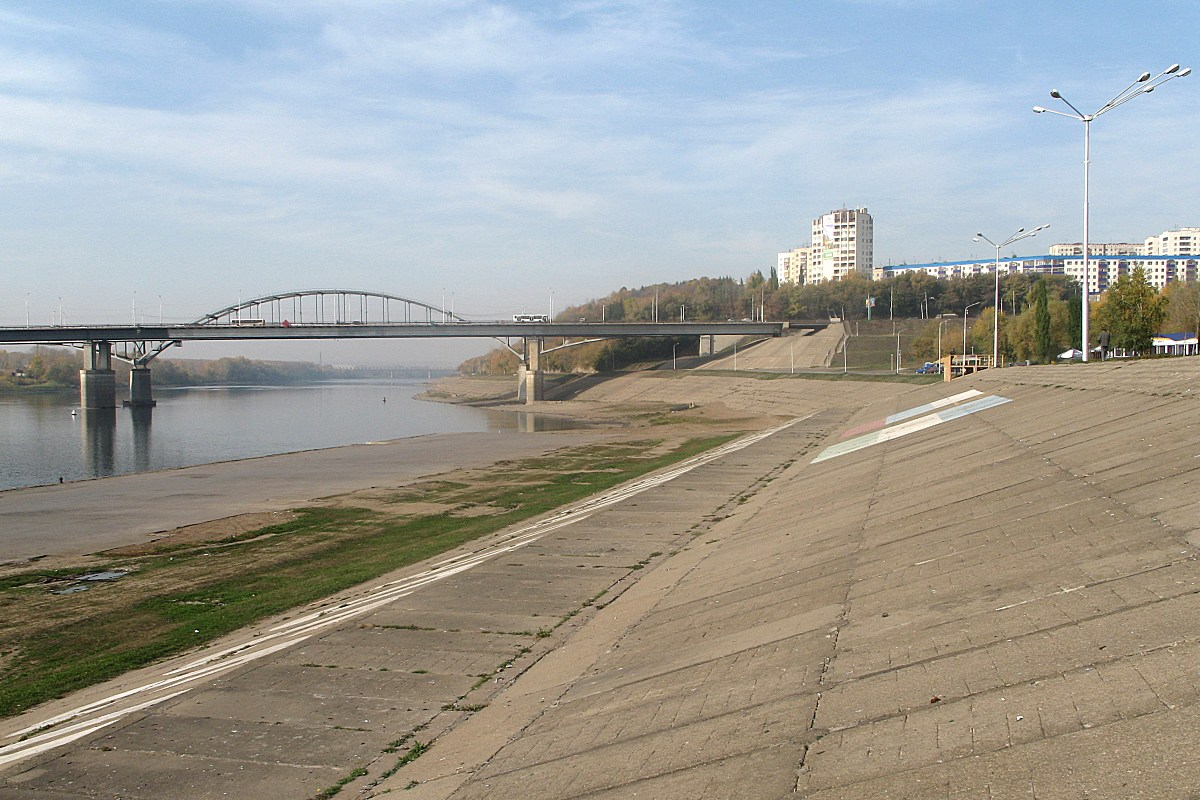
The Belaya River in Ufa
