= Bystry Tanyp =

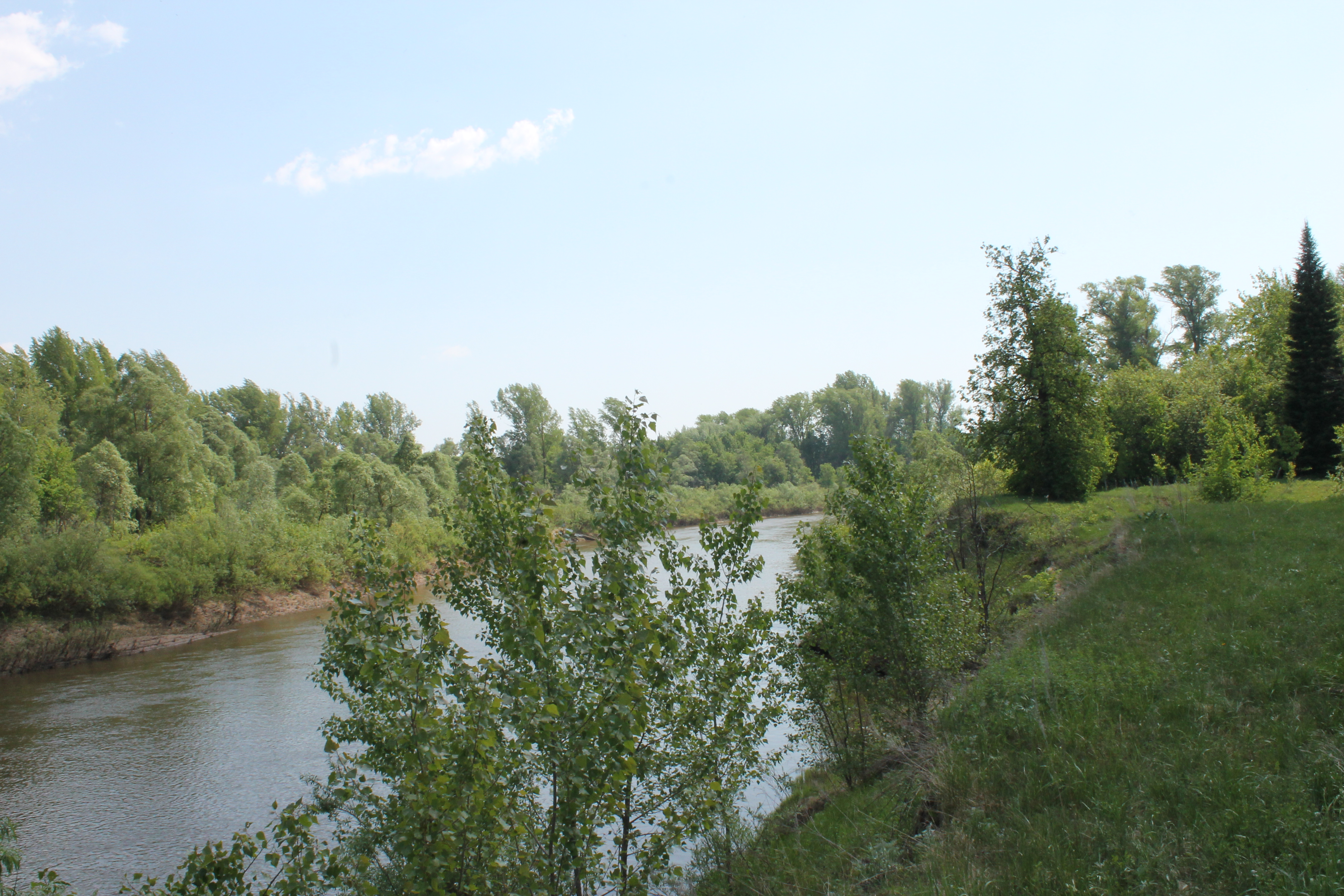
- Native name: Быстрый Танып (Russian)

Location
- Country: Russia

Physical characteristics
- Mouth: Belaya
  - coordinates: 55°42′18″N 54°33′26″E
- Length: 345 km (214 mi)
- Basin size: 7,560 km^{2} (2,920 sq mi)

Basin features
- Progression: Belaya→ Kama→ Volga→ Caspian Sea

The Bystry Tanyp or Tanyp (Bashkir: Тере Танып, Етеҙ Танып, Tere Tanıp, Eteź Tanıp; Russian: Быстрый Танып), is a river in Bashkortostan and Perm Krai in Russia, a right tributary of the Belaya. The river is 345 kilometres (214 mi) long, and the area of its drainage basin is 7,560 square kilometres (2,920 mi^{2}). The Bystry Tanyp freezes up in the first half of November and remains icebound until April.
