= Novokhusainovo =

Novokhusainovo Новохусаиново
- Village
- Location within Bashkortostan Location within Russia
- Coordinates: 54°32′N 59°05′E
- Country: Russia
- Region: Bashkortostan
- District: Uchalinsky District
- Time zone: UTC+5:00

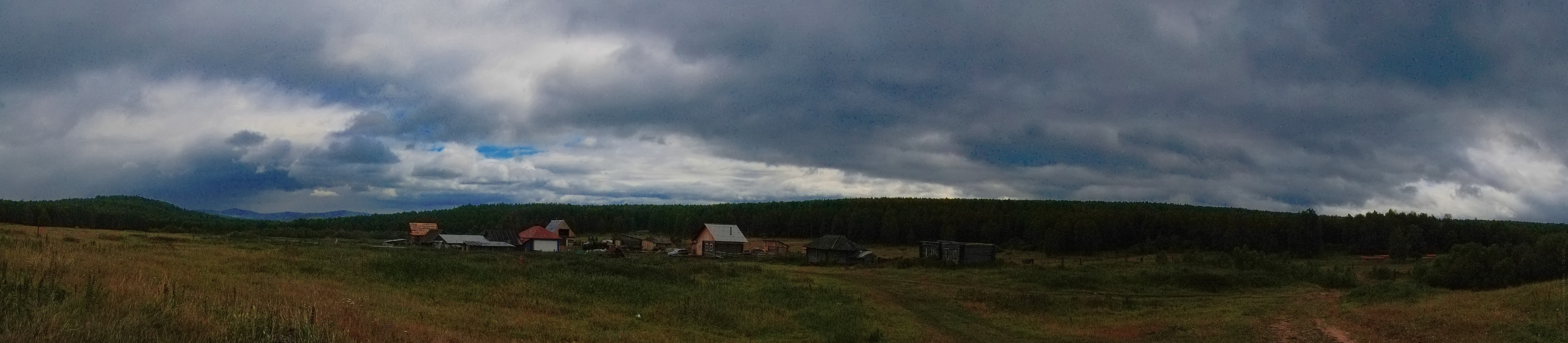
Panorama of Novokhusainovo

Novokhusainovo (Russian: Новохусаиново; Bashkir: Яңы Хөсәйен, Yañı Xösäyen) is a rural locality (a village) in Kiryabinsky Selsoviet, Uchalinsky District, Bashkortostan, Russia. The population was 2 as of 2010. There is 1 street.

== Geography ==
Novokhusainovo is located 50 km northwest of Uchaly (the district's administrative centre) by road. Kiryabinskoye is the nearest rural locality.
