= Assel, Gelderland =

Assel
- Hamlet
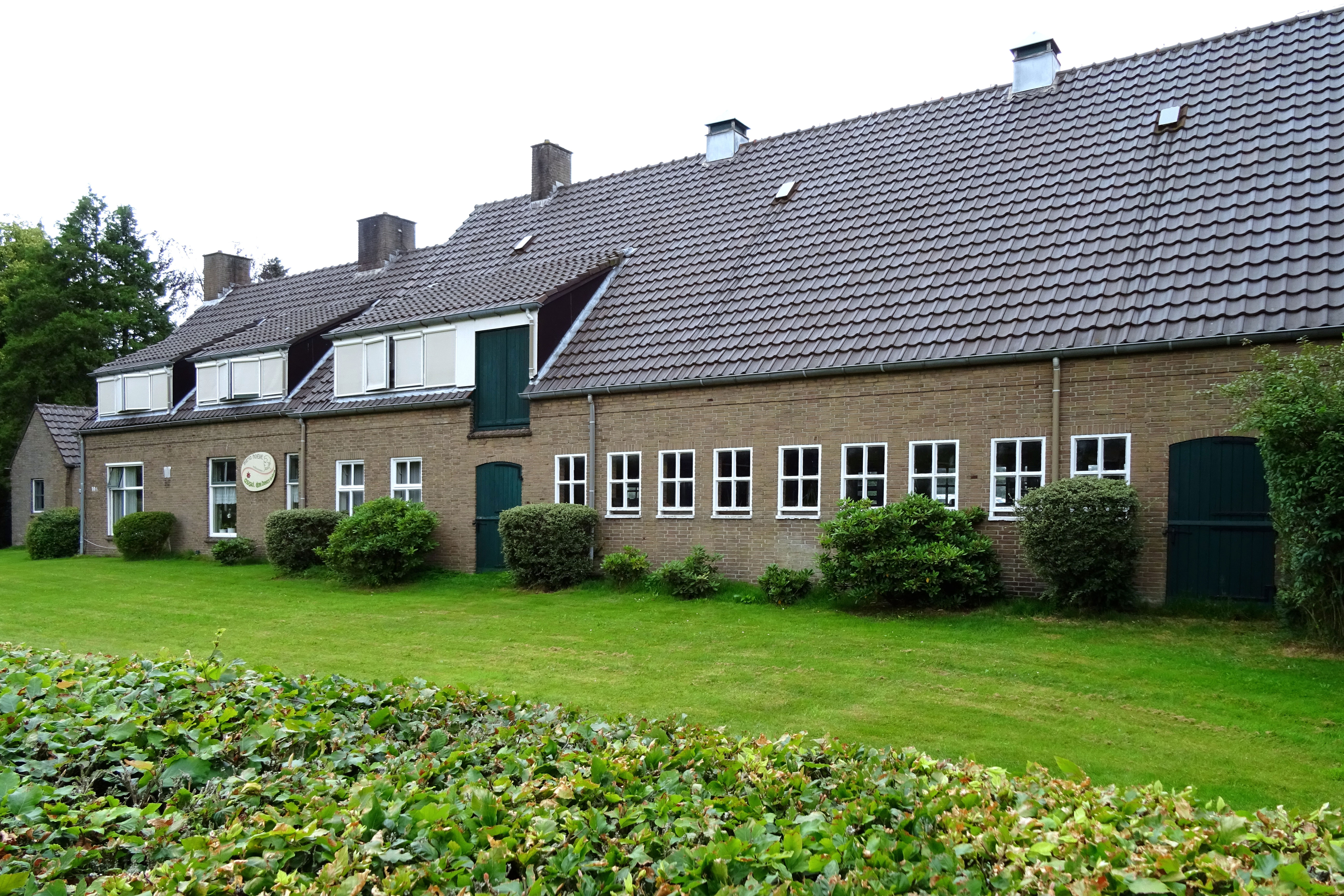
- Mariahoeve

- Location in the province of Gelderland Assel (Netherlands)
- Coordinates: 52°12′1″N 5°50′11″E
- Country: Netherlands
- Province: Gelderland
- Municipality: Apeldoorn
- Elevation: 92 m (302 ft)
- Time zone: UTC+1 (CET)
  - Summer (DST): UTC+2 (CEST)
- Postal code: 7346
- Dialing code: 055

Assel (Dutch pronunciation: [ˈɑsəl]) is a hamlet in the municipality of Apeldoorn in the Netherlands, located close to the village of Hoog Soeren.

It was first mentioned in 814 or 815 as Hasle. The etymology is unclear. It is not a statistical entity, and the postal authorities have placed it under Hoog Soeren. It consists of about 10 houses.

== Gallery ==
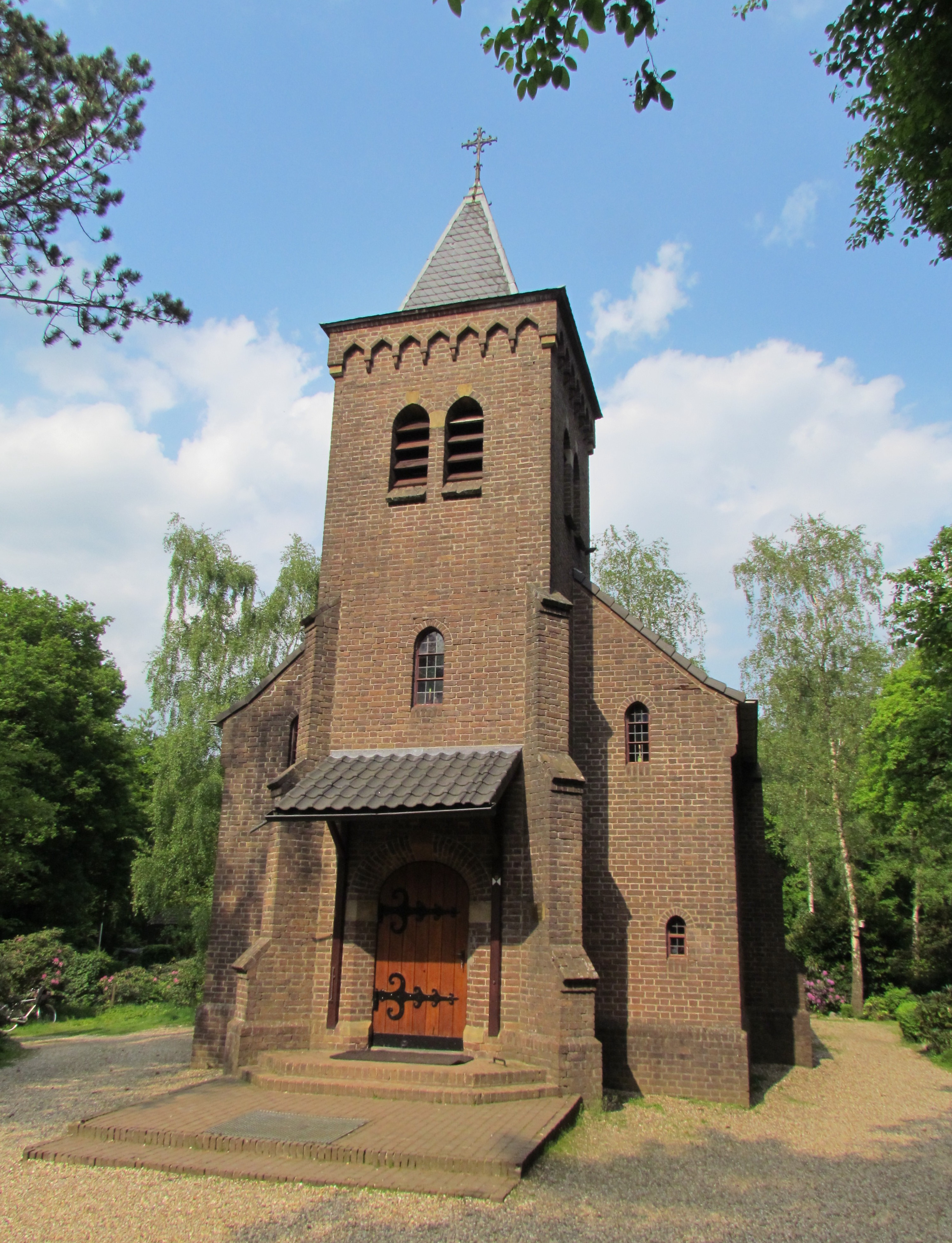
Heilige Geest Kapel

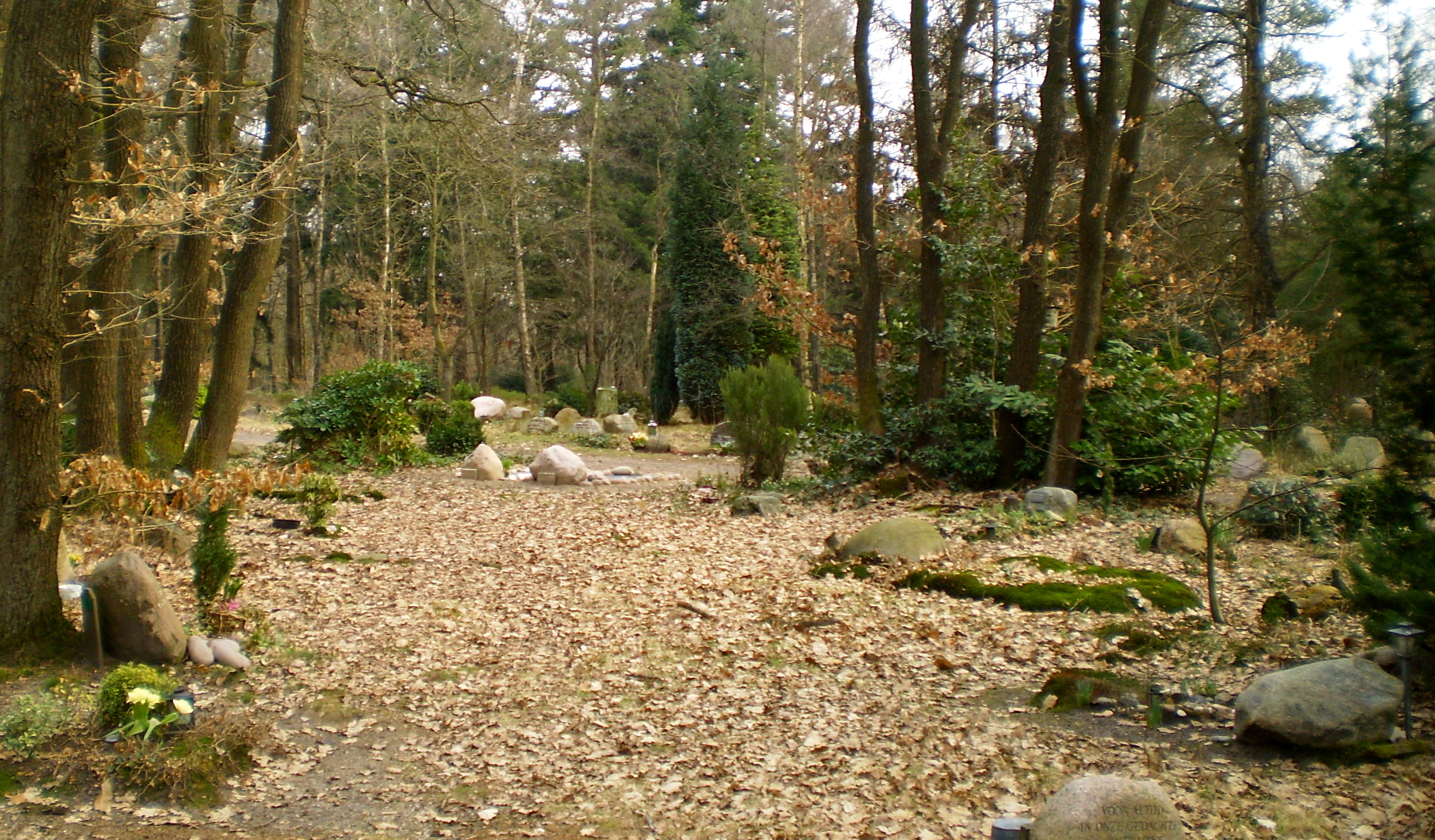
Naturecemetery

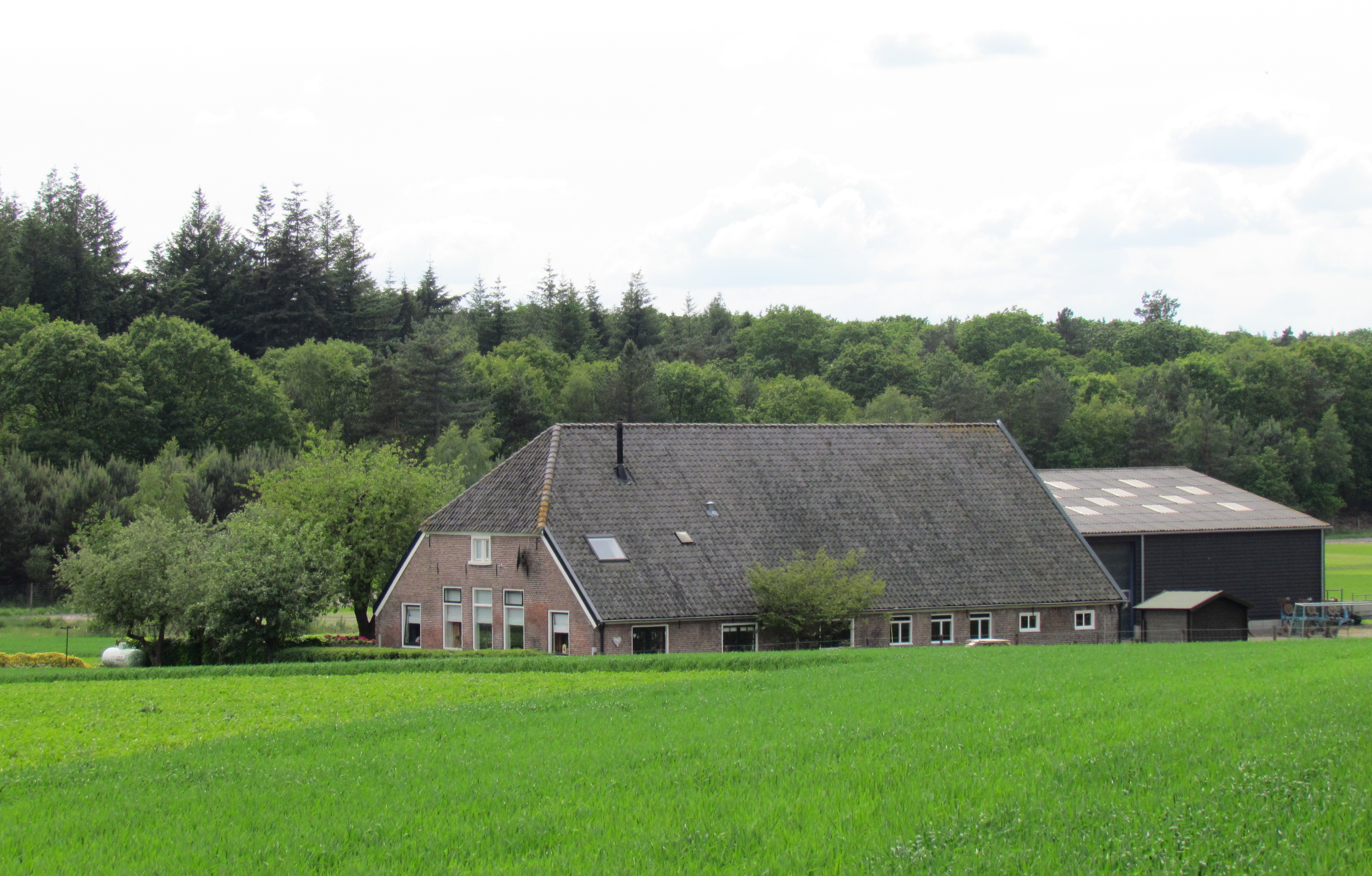
Farmstead Haslo
