= Zilim =

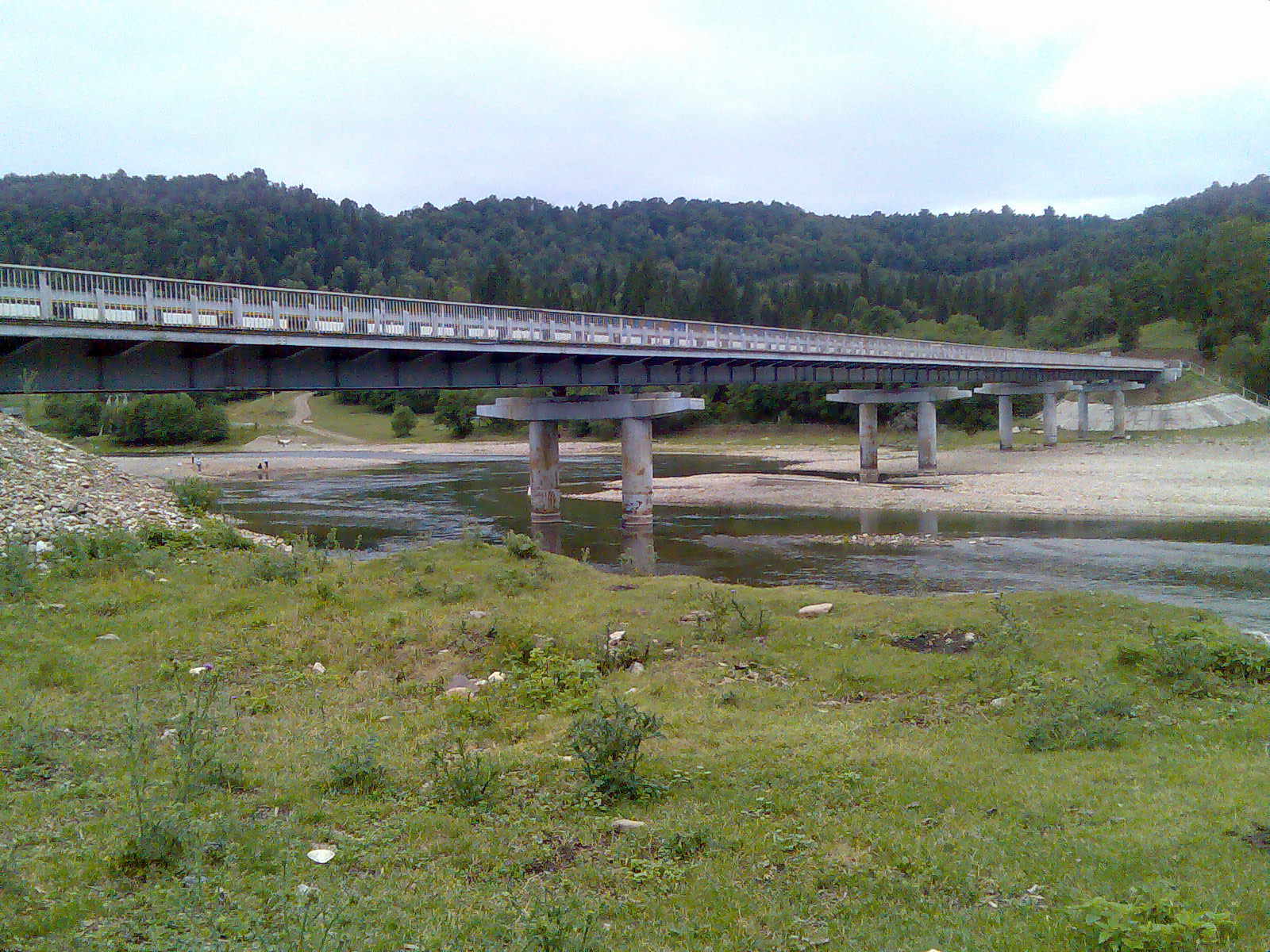

- Mouth of Zilim
- Native name: Еҙем (Bashkir)

Location
- Country: Russia

Physical characteristics
- Mouth: Belaya
  - coordinates: 54°23′33″N 56°28′03″E
- Length: 215 km (134 mi)
- Basin size: 3,280 km^{2} (1,270 sq mi)

Basin features
- Progression: Belaya→ Kama→ Volga→ Caspian Sea

The Zilim (Russian: Зилим, Bashkir: Еҙем, Yeźem) is a river in Bashkortostan, Russia. It is a right tributary of the Belaya. The river is 215 kilometres (134 mi) long, and the area of its drainage basin is 3,280 square kilometres (1,270 mi^{2}).
