= Bolshoy Ik =

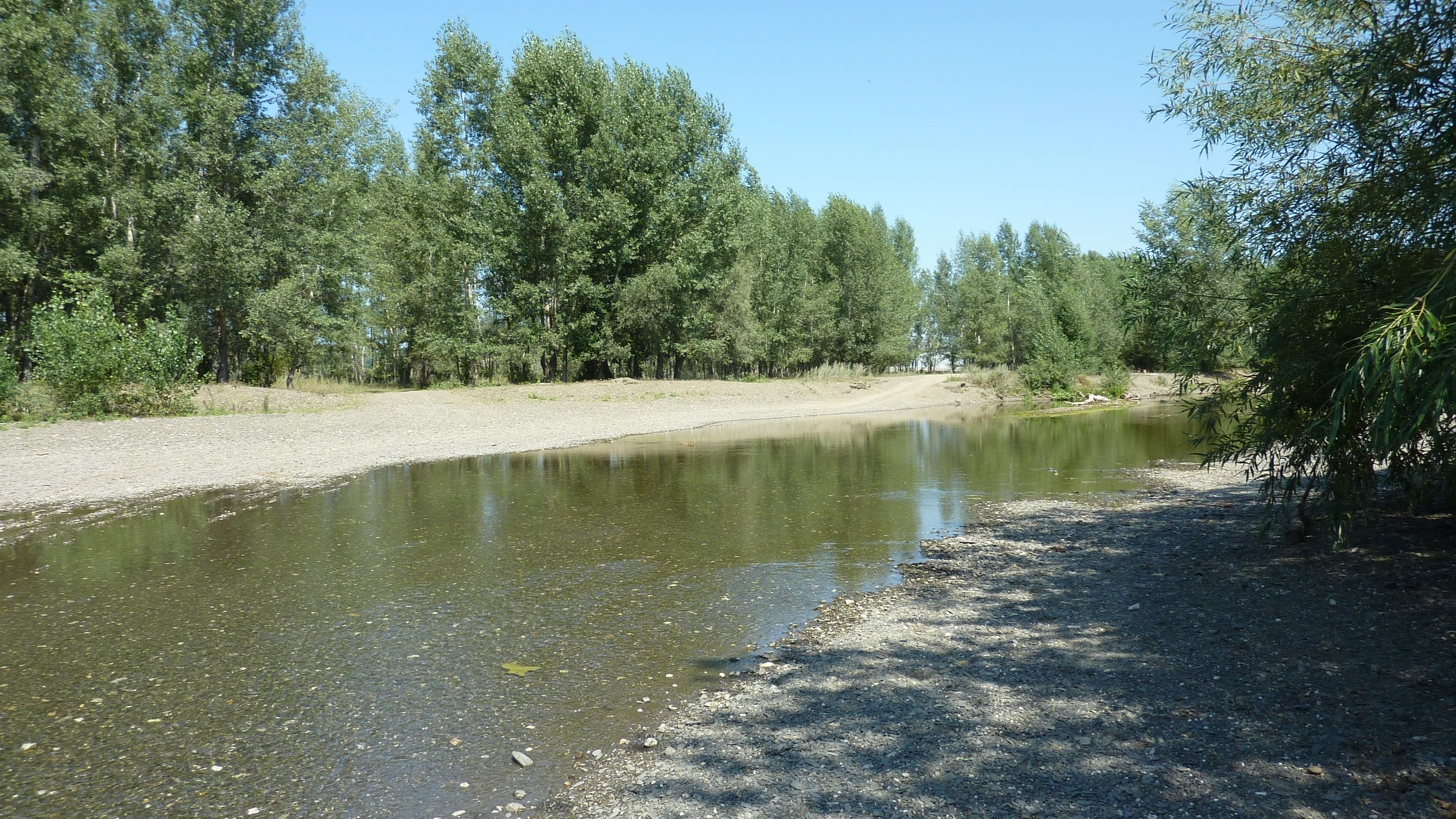
- Very small ford across the Bolshoy Ik

Location
- Country: Bashkortostan and Orenburg Oblast, Russia

Physical characteristics
- Source
  - location: South Urals, Bashkortostan
- Mouth: Sakmara
  - location: Saraktash, Orenburg Oblast
  - coordinates: 51°49′24″N 56°23′22″E
- Length: 341 km (212 mi)
- Basin size: 7,670 km^{2} (2,960 sq mi)
- Discharge
  - average: 61 m^{3}/s (2,200 cu ft/s)

Basin features
- Progression: Sakmara→ Ural→ Caspian Sea

The Bolshoy Ik (Russian: Большой Ик, literally Greater Ik; Bashkir: Оло Ыйыҡ, Olo Iyıq) is a tributary of the Sakmara, which flows south from the southern end of the Ural Mountains in Bashkortostan and Orenburg Oblast, Russia. The Bolshoy Ik flows into the Sakmara at Saraktash.

The river is generally fed by snowmelt.

== See also ==
- List of rivers of Russia
- Nakas (mountain)
