= Sakmara (river) =

Sakmara, Haqmar
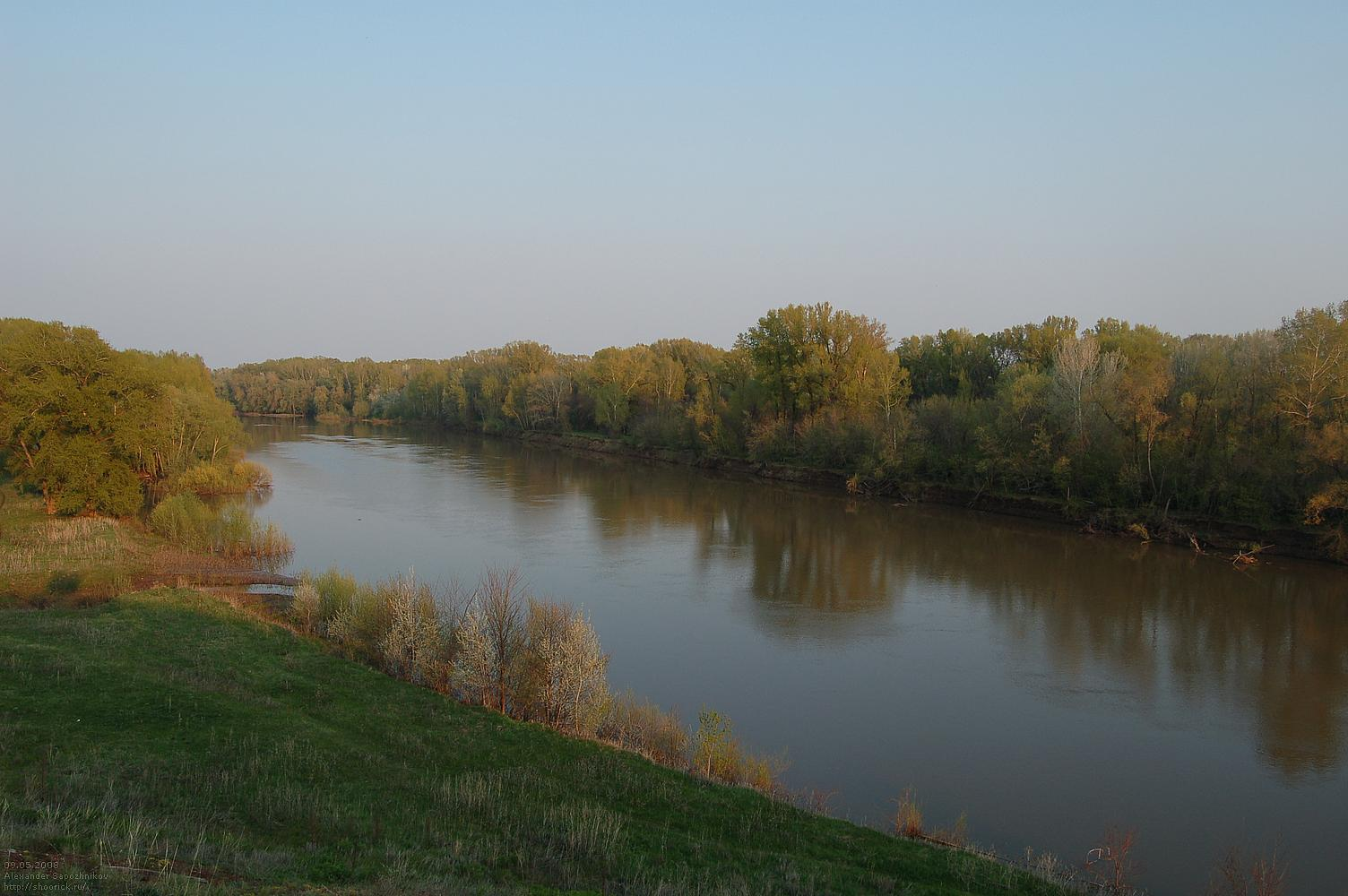
- The Sakmara near Saraktash, Russia

Location
- Country: Bashkortostan and Orenburg Oblast, Russia

Physical characteristics
- Source
  - location: Uraltau range, Urals, Bashkortostan
- Mouth: Ural
  - location: Orenburg
  - coordinates: 51.7722°N 55.0264°E
- Length: 798 km (496 mi)
- Basin size: 30,200 km^{2} (11,700 sq mi)
- Discharge
  - average: 144.0 m^{3}/s (5,090 cu ft/s)

Basin features
- Progression: Ural→ Caspian Sea

The Sakmara (Russian: Сакмара; Bashkir: Һаҡмар, Haqmar) is a river in Russia that drains the southern tip of the Ural Mountains south into the river Ural. It is 798 kilometres (496 mi) long, and has a drainage basin of 30,200 square kilometres (11,700 sq mi). It is a right tributary of the Ural, which it meets in Orenburg. The source of the Sakmara is in the Republic of Bashkortostan. Other towns along the Sakmara are Yuldybayevo (Bashkortostan), Kuvandyk, and the railway station Saraktash close to the 18th-century Wozdwizhenskaya Fortress (Orenburg Oblast).

The Sakmara rises in the southern Ural Mountains about 60 kilometres (37 mi) west-southwest of Magnitogorsk and flows south through a valley with some canyon development. At Kuvandyk it swings west, leaves the mountains, and flows west parallel to the Ural River with many meanders for about 150 kilometres (93 mi) (straight-line distance) before turning south to meet the Ural. Major tributaries are the Salmysh and the Bolshoy Ik, both from the north, with the latter joining the Sakmara near Saraktash.

The Sakmarian Age of the Permian Period of geological time is named for the Sakmara River.
