= Wozdwizhenskaya Fortress =

Coordinates: 51.7575°N 56.4278°E

Site information
- Type: Fort
- Controlled by: Russian Empire

Site history
- Built: 1742
- In use: 1743-1918
- Battles/wars: Pugachev's Rebellion

Wozdwizhenskaya Fortress (1742) on the Sakmara River was the second fort built as a part of Sakmara Distance by Ivan Neplyuyev during his governance of the Orenburg Commission. It was located on the Sakmara River, southeast of Orenburg, 100 miles (160 km) west of Orsk, and 30 miles (48 km) north of Werneozernaya Fortress. It was built for protection against raids by nomadic Kyrgyz tribes for capturing of slaves from the Russian frontiers on the Caspian Sea and slave trading to Khiva.

The Wozdwizhenskaya Cossacks supported the Imperial government during Pugachev's Rebellion in 1773–1775. The fortress was completely destroyed by the bombardment of the Red Guards units in May 1918 for supporting the counterrevolution of Alexander Dutov against the Soviet authorities.
