= State Water Register =

State Water Register (Russian: Государственный водный реестр) is a systematized collection of documented information on water bodies owned by the Russian Federation, subjects of the Russian Federation, municipalities, individuals and legal entities and individual entrepreneurs, on their use, and on river basins and watershed districts.

The register was created by the Resolution (legal act) of the Government of the Russian Federation № 253 of 28 April 2007 signed by Prime Minister of Russia, Mikhail Fradkov. The information contained in the register is publicly available, except if classified.

The register has three parts:

- Bodies of water and water resources, containing information on river basins, their watershed district, and other bodies of water located within the river basins;
- Water usage;
- Infrastructure on bodies of water, containing information on systems of water usage and hydroengineering and other structures located on bodies of water.
