= Tyulgan, Tyulgansky Settlement Council, Tyulgansky District, Orenburg Oblast =

Rural locality in Orenburg Oblast, Russia

Tyulgan Тюльган
- Interactive map of Tyulgan
- Location of Tyulgan Tyulgan (European Russia) Tyulgan (Russia)
- Coordinates: 52°20′30″N 56°09′41″E
- Country: Russia
- Federal subject: Orenburg Oblast
- Administrative district: Tyulgansky District
- Founded: 1953

Population
  - Estimate (2021): 9,297 )
- Time zone: UTC+5 (MSK+2)
- Postal code: 462010
- OKTMO ID: 53653435101

Tyulgan (Russian: Тюльган) is a rural locality (a settlement) and the administrative center of Tyulgansky District, Orenburg Oblast, Russia. Population: 8,959 (2010 census); 10,161 (2002 census); 10,681 (1989 Soviet census).
