= Watershed district (Russia) =

Group of water bodies of Russia

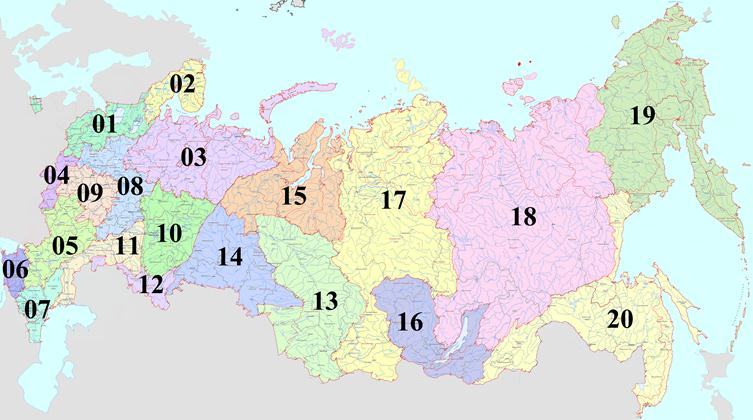
Map (01 - Baltic, 02 - Barents–Belomor, 03 - Dvina–Pechora, 04 - Dnieper, 05 - Don, 06 - Kuban, 07 - Western Caspian, 08 - Upper Volga, 09 - Oka, 10 - Kama, 11 - Lower Volga, 12 - Ural, 13 - Upper Ob, 14 - Irtysh, 15 - Lower Ob, 16 - Angara–Baikal, 17 - Yenisey, 18 - Lena, 19 - Anadyr–Kolyma, 20 - Amur)

A watershed district (Russian: Бассейновый округ, romanized: Basseynovy okrug) in Russia is a group of water bodies (drainage basins and the associated subterranean waters) as defined by the Water Code of the Russian Federation, serving as the main unit of the management of use and protection of the water bodies of Russia.

Chapter 4, article 28 of the Russian Water Code of 2007, defines 20 districts: Baltic Watershed District, Barents–Belomor Watershed District, Dvina–Pechora Watershed District, Dnieper Watershed District, Don Watershed District, Kuban Watershed District, Western Caspian Watershed District, Upper Volga Watershed District, Oka Watershed District, Kama Watershed District, Lower Volga Watershed District, Ural Watershed District, Upper Ob Watershed District, Irtysh Watershed District, Lower Ob Watershed District, Angara–Baikal Watershed District, Yenisey Watershed District, Lena Watershed District, Anadyr-Kolyma watershed district, and Amur watershed district.

In addition, after the 2014 Russian annexation of Crimea, the Crimean watershed district was established in 2016 by the Federal Law of 31 October 2016 no. 384-ФЗ, which amended the Water Code.
