= Shulgan-Tash Nature Reserve =

Nature reserve in Bashkortostan, Russia

- Russian: Шульган-Таш заповедник (Also: Shulgan-Tash)
- IUCN category Ia (strict nature reserve)
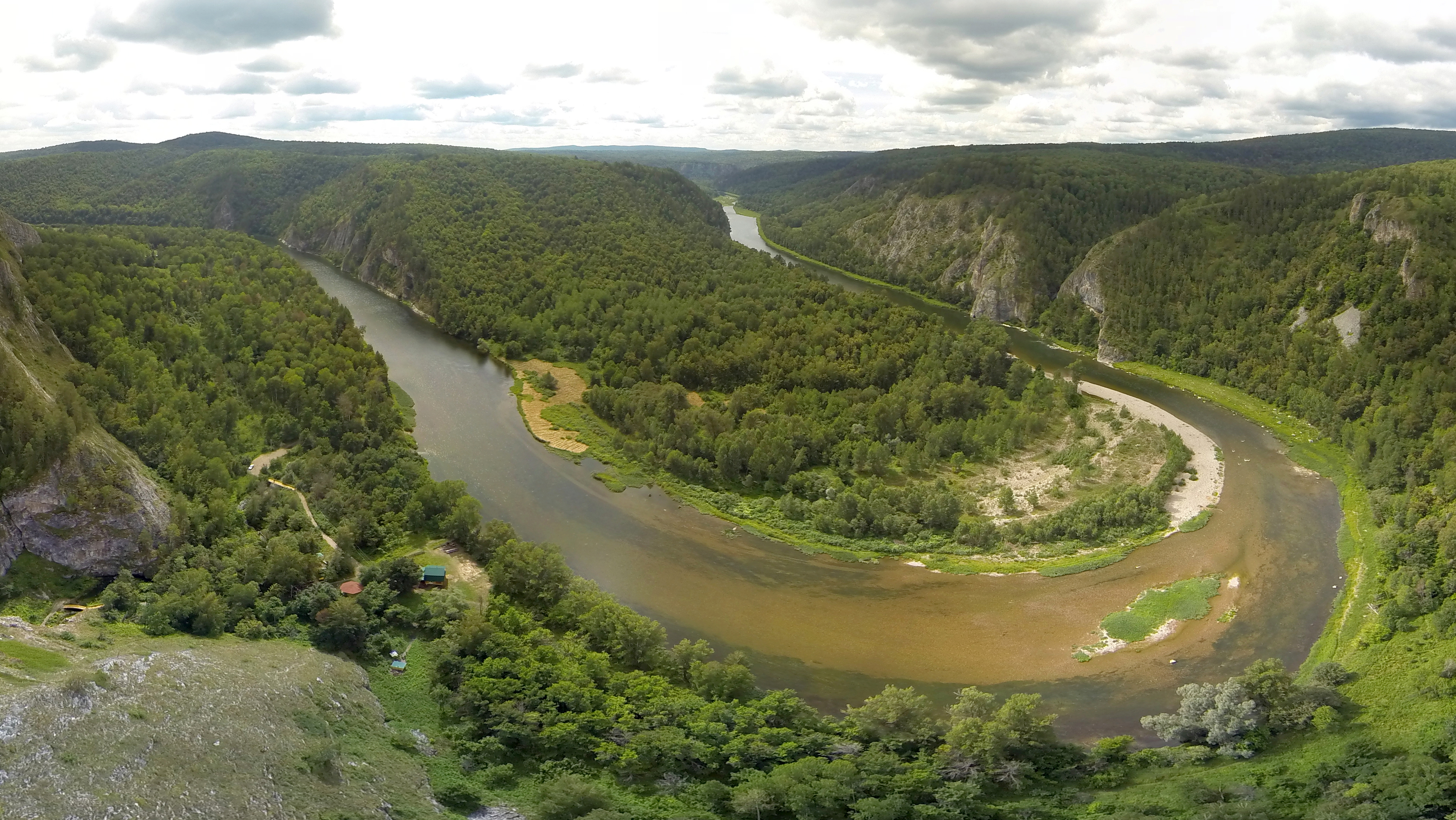
- View of the Belaya River from above the Shulgan-Tash Cave

- Location within Russia
- Location: Bashkortostan
- Nearest city: Starosubkhangulovo
- Coordinates: 53°2′0″N 57°3′0″E
- Area: 22,531 hectares (55,675 acres; 87 sq mi)
- Established: 1986
- Governing body: Ministry of Natural Resources and Environment (Russia)
- Website: http://www.shulgan-tash.ru/

Shulgan-Tash Nature Reserve (Bashkir: Шүлгәнташ, Russian: Шульган-Таш заповедник) is a Russian zapovednik (strict nature reserve) in the western foothills of the Southern Ural Mountains, in the Burzyansky District of Bashkortostan. The reserve, nestled in dense forest and rugged karst terrain, takes its name from the Shulgan-Tash Cave, famous for its Paleolithic cave paintings. The nearest town is Starosubkhangulovo (about 40 km away).

In 2012, the reserve was added to the UNESCO Biosphere Reserve "Bashkir Ural", in particular for protection of the Burzyuan bee, which has been cultivated since old times by the local Bashkir people. As of 2016, the reserve is home to 13 full-time "bortniks" — traditional beekeepers who practice the ancient art of tree-hollow apiculture, nurturing wild honeybee colonies.

== Topography ==
The Shulgan-Tash Reserve terrain consists of low-lying foothills (100 - 300 meter ridges, bisected by river and stream valleys); the overall altitude range in the reserve is 240 – 700 meters. The cover is over 90% light-coniferous-deciduous forests; the remainder is small sectors of mountain steppes and meadows. Bashkiriya National Park is to the west and south, and Shulgan-Tash includes the Altyn-Solok Entomological Reserve. The Nugush River and Belaya River flow through the reserve.

The most famous of the karst caves in the reserve is the Shulgan-Tash / Kapova — a World Heritage site known for containing over 200 Paleolithic paintings. It is also an ethnographic site of importance to the local Bashkiris. The paintings feature mammoths, horses, geometric shapes, complex characters, and anthropomorphic figures. Inside the cave is an underground river (the "Shulgan").

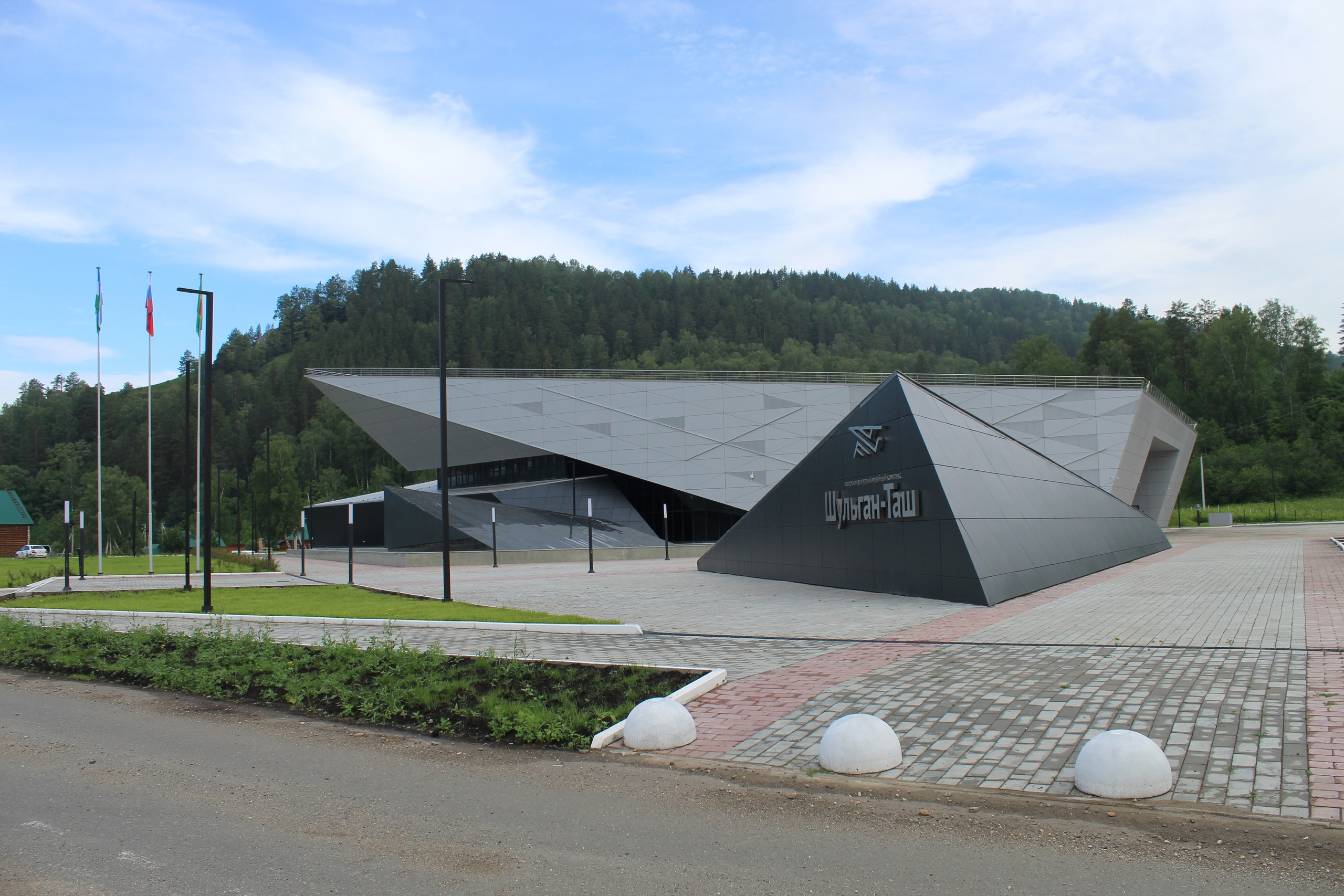
The modern museum centre near the cave

== Climate and ecoregion ==
Shulgan-Tash is located in the East European forest steppe ecoregion, a transition zone between the broadleaf forests of the north and the grasslands to the south. This ecoregion is characterized by a mosaic of forests, steppe, and riverine wetlands.

The climate of Shulgan-Tash is Humid continental climate, warm summer (Köppen climate classification (Dfb)). This climate is characterized by large swings in temperature, both diurnally and seasonally, with mild summers and cold, snowy winters.

== Flora and fauna ==
Shulgan-Tash is at the meeting zone of deciduous forests (the eastern edge of linden, oak, elm, and maple, with some oak on the southern slopes) and light-coniferous taiga (mostly pine). Scientists on the reserve have recorded 877 species of vascular plants, 184 of mosses, 233 of lichens, 117 species of mushrooms, and 202 species of algae and cyanobacteria. Of the vascular plants, about 10% are endemic, and 10 species of which are relic spruce and linden.

The animals are those typical of the mountain-forest meeting zone of European woods (such as mice), and representatives of the Siberian woods (hare, etc.) Common large mammals are elk, bear, fox, and marten. Scientists on the reserve have recorded 60 species of mammals.

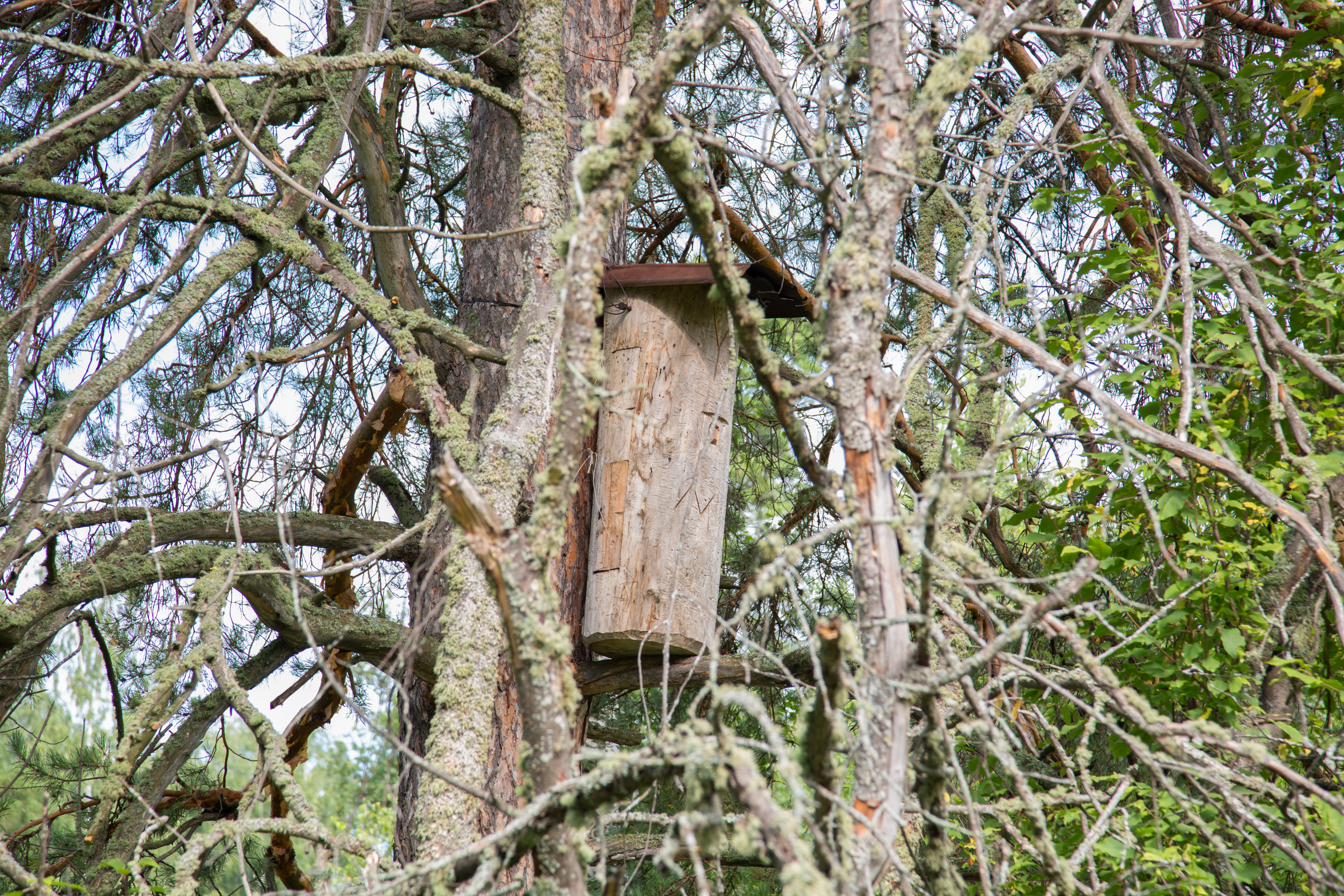
A traditional wild hive

The primary concern of the reserve is protect the gene pool of bees from cross-breeding with outside bees. (Importation of bees is banned). As domesticated bee colonies outside of the reserve suffer from in-breeding and other disorders, the Shulgan-Tash Reserve can provide a classic service of a 'reserve', exporting bees to strengthen outside stocks.

== Ecoeducation and access ==
The Shulgan-Tash Reserve is one of the Russian Zapovedniks with relatively advanced tourist facilities; over 36,000 tourists visit the site each year. There is a cave museum, an apiculture museum, equipped playground, parking facilities, apiary, observation platforms, a juice bar, and a souvenir shop (selling wild honey). There are a number of 'ecotourist' routes in the reserve, mostly hiking trails to the observation sites, the cave, and the bee production site. The main office is in the village of Irgizly.

== See also ==
- List of Russian Nature Reserves (class 1a 'zapovedniks')
