= Tolpar Ufa =

- City: Ufa, Russia
- League: Junior Hockey League
- Conference: Eastern
- Founded: 2009
- Home arena: Ice Palace/Ufa Arena
- Colors
- Head coach: Mikhail Vasilyev
- Affiliates: Salavat Yulaev Ufa (KHL); Toros Neftekamsk (VHL)

Franchise history
- 2009–present: Tolpar Ufa

Junior Hockey Club Tolpar Ufa or Minor Hockey Club Tolpar Ufa (MHC Tolpar) (Russian: Молодёжный Хоккейный Клуб Толпар (Уфа), Bashkir: «Толпар» хоккей клубы) is a junior ice hockey team from Ufa, which contains players from the Salavat Yulaev school. They are members of the Russian Junior Hockey League (JHL), the top tier of junior hockey in the country.

== Name ==
The club is named after the Tolpar, a winged horse in Bashkir mythology similar to Pegasus. The JHL club's name must not be same as their affiliated Kontinental Hockey League club's name.

Prior to 2009 the team was known as Salavat Yulaev-2. As the JHL does not allow junior clubs to share names with their senior league affiliates, the team was required to change their name upon joining the JHl in 2009. Initially, fans were invited to vote between Akbuzat, Bashkir Bees and Tolpar, however the club's board decided to go with the name Tolpar before the vote was scheduled to occur.
