= Bashkiriya National Park =

National park in Bashkortostan, Russia

- IUCN category II (national park)
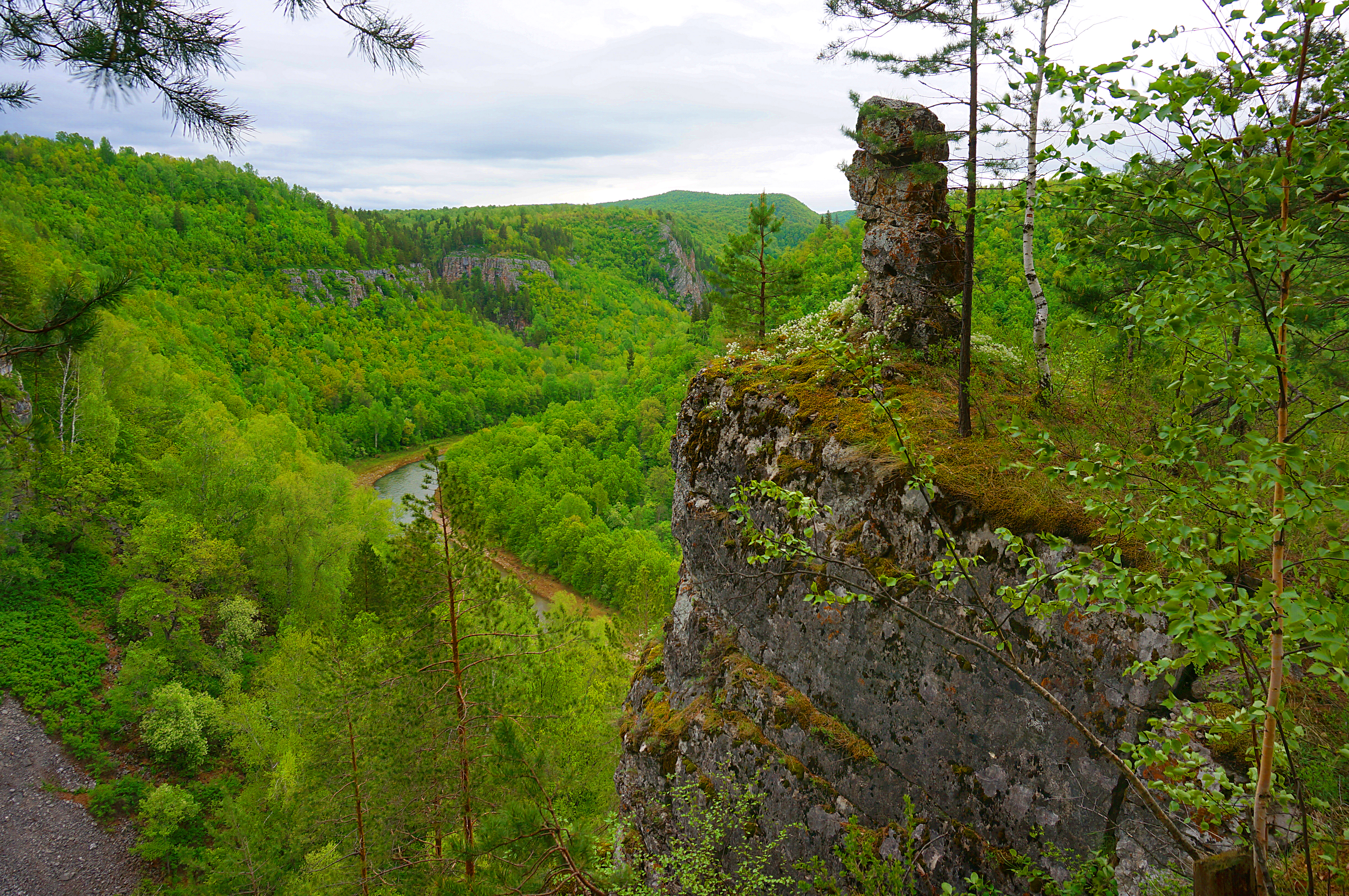
- Bashkiriya National Park

- Location within Russia
- Location: Bashkortostan
- Nearest city: Meleuz
- Coordinates: 53°03′N 56°32′E
- Area: 92,000 hectares (227,337 acres; 920 km^{2}; 355 sq mi)
- Established: 1986; 40 years ago
- Governing body: FGBI "Bashkiriya"
- Website: http://www.npbashkiria.ru/

Bashkiriya National Park (Russian: Национальный парк «Башкирия»; Bashkir: Башҡортостан милли паркы) covers a large contiguous forest on the southern end of the Ural Mountains. The park is an important buffer between the industrialized flatlands to the west, and the mountainous and sparsely populated Shulgan-Tash nature reserve and Altyn-Solok ("Golden Bee Tree") entomological reserve to the east and north. Bashkirya National Park lies between the Nugush River (and the popular recreational zone of the Nugush Reservoir), and the southern bend of the Belaya River. The park features deep river valley cuts in a karst topography. It is known for a natural bridge across the river Kuperlya. The park is situated across three districts (Meleuzovsky, Kurgachinsky and Burzyansky) of the Republic of Bashkortostan (also known as "Bashkiriya").

== Topography ==
Boundaries of Bashkiriya National Park, at southwestern end of Ural Mountains. Size of the park is about 30 km north to south.

The park rises from flatlands in the west, into medium-height Karst (limestone) uplands to the east. The northern boundary is along the Nugush River (in Turkic, "clean, bright"), which flows through deep wooded valleys with limestone formations on the slopes. The Nugush Reservoir (25 km^{2} (9.7 sq mi)) where the river flows west out of the mountains. The reservoir is a popular destination for locals in the summer; the industrial town of Meleuz is only 20 miles (32 km) to the west, making Bashkiriya National Park an important point of recreation as well as an ecological buffer to the protected areas to the east.

The southern boundary is the Belaya River as it bends around the south end of the Ural mountains. In the east, the Park borders on the "Shulgan-Tash" State Sanctuary. Over 92% of the park is forested. The central region of the park is relatively difficult to access, with older growth and dead trees that support a wide variety of wildlife.

The most striking landforms are the various limestone formations: outcrops, caves, grottoes, and underground rivers. The rocky banks of the Nugush and Belaya rivers reach 150 meters (490 ft) in height. The "Kuperlya Natural Bridge" is a karst formation that is 20 meters (66 ft) above the ground and 10 meters (33 ft) across; it is the remains of a former underground river. There are 30 known caves in the park, with 8.2 km (5.1 mi) of major passageways. One cave, the Sumgan Cave, is the largest cave in the Urals, with major and minor passages up to 10 km (6.2 mi) long, and reaching down to a depth of 126 meters (413 ft). The Sumgan Cave is located in a particular isolated terrain known as "Kutuk-Sumgan" ("kutuk" - "water well", "sumgan" - "dived").

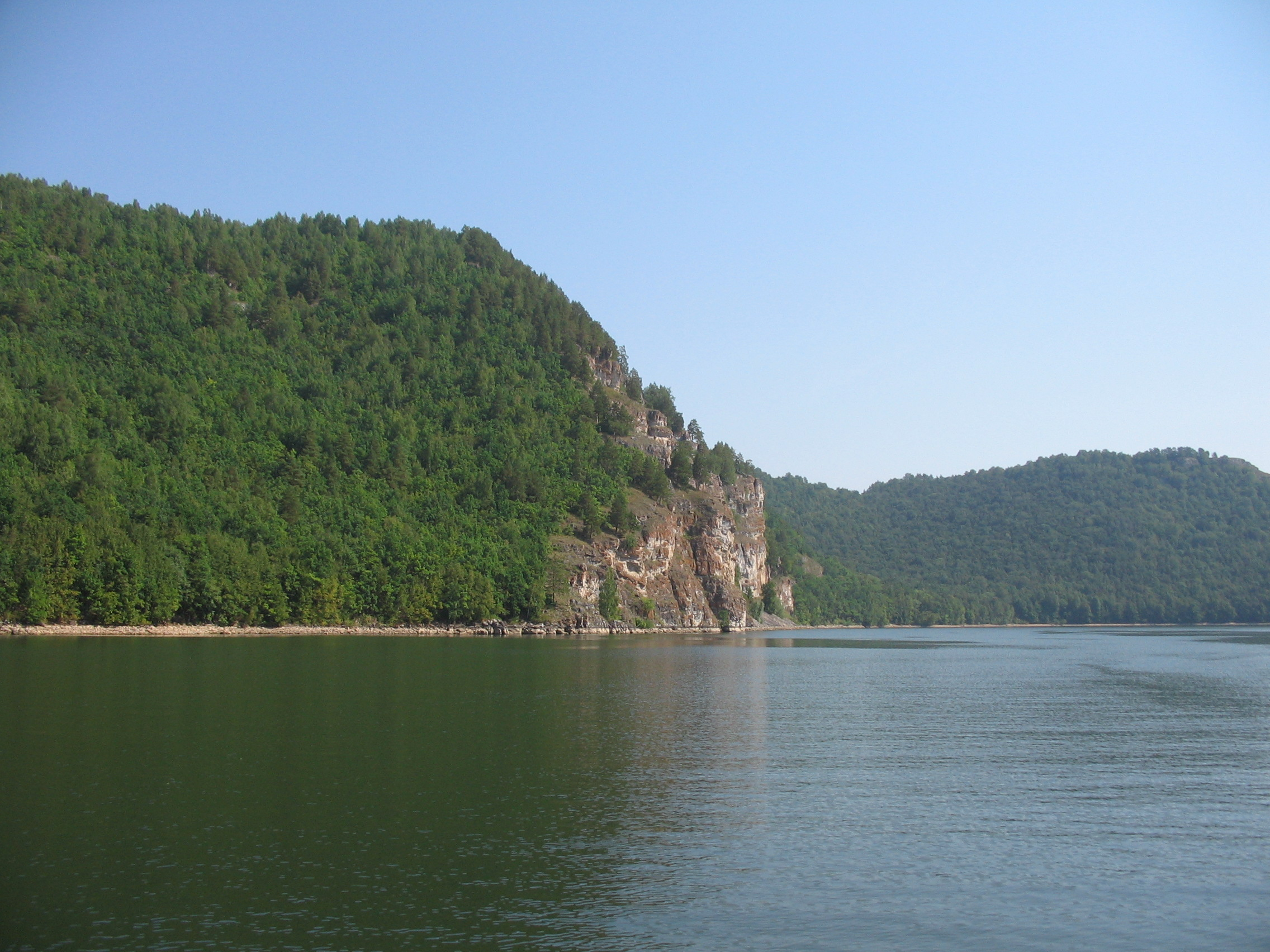
Nugush Reservoir, in the northwest of the park

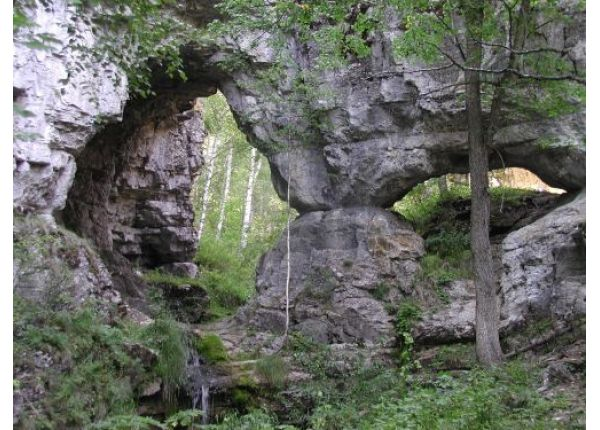
Kuperlya Natural Bridge

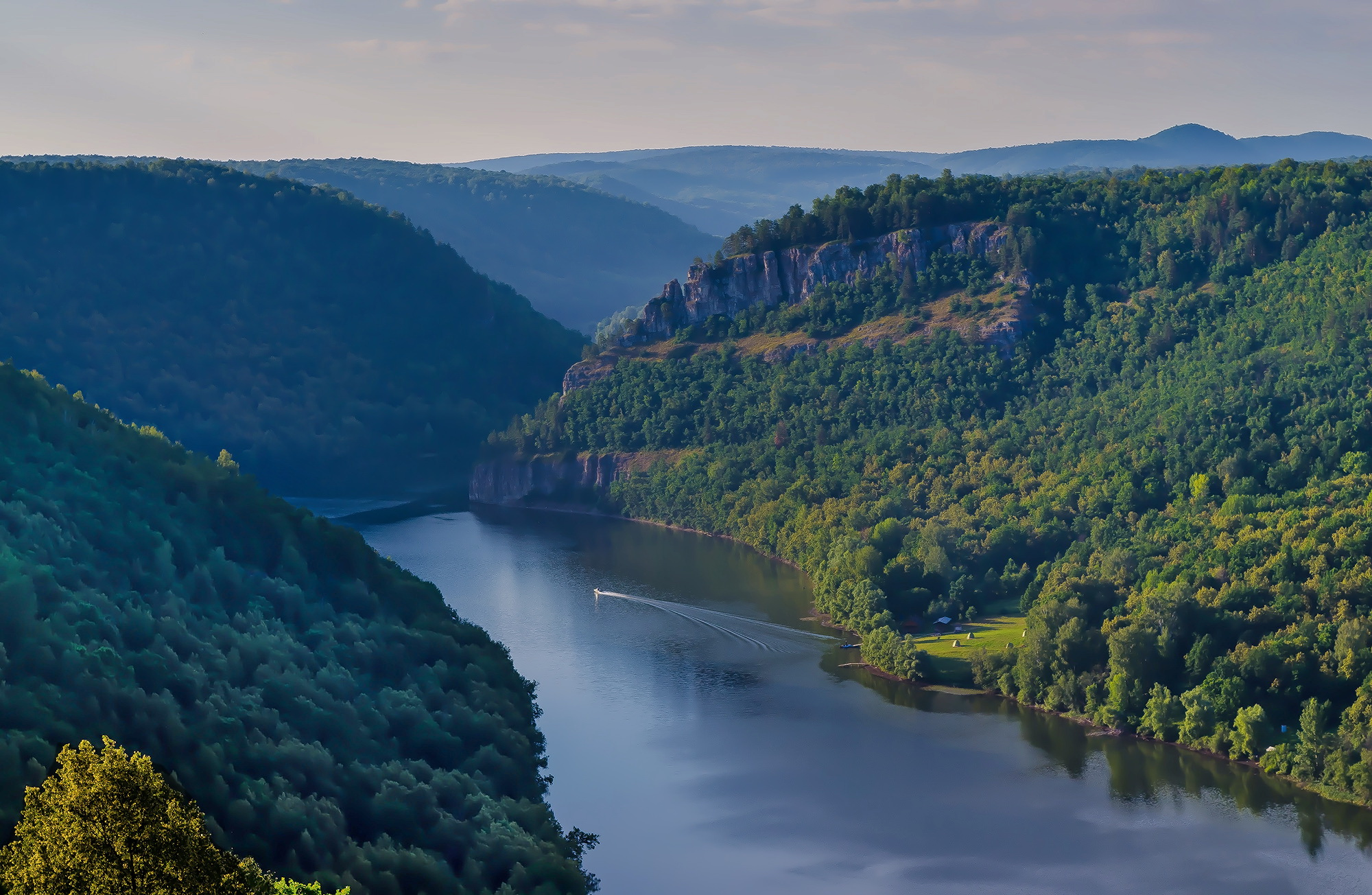
Falcon Rock, on the Nugush River

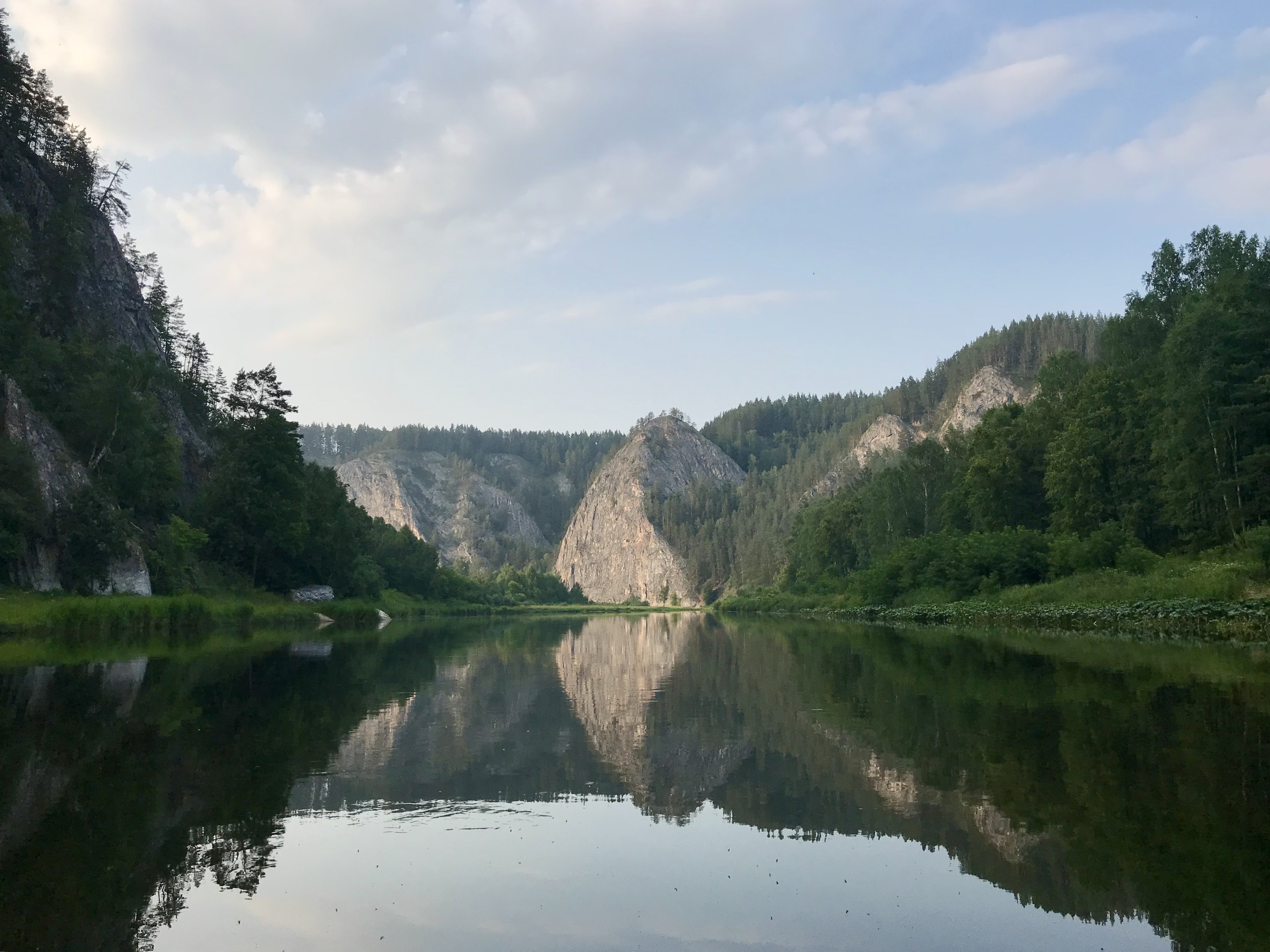
Belaya River

== Climate and ecoregion ==
The climate of Bashkiriya is Humid continental climate, warm summer (Köppen climate classification (Dfb)). This climate is characterized by large swings in temperature, both diurnally and seasonally, with mild summers and cold, snowy winters.

Ufa, Bashkortostan

Climate chart (precipitation, max. and min. temperature)
J	F	M	A	M	J	J	A	S	O	N	D
1.9 17 1	1.5 20 1	1.3 32 13	1.3 52 32	1.8 68 44	2.6 76 53	2.2 79 57	2.3 74 53	2 63 44	2.3 48 34	2.1 30 19	2 20 −5
- █ Average max. and min. temperatures in °F
- █ Precipitation totals in inches
Metric conversion
J	F	M	A	M	J	J	A	S	O	N	D
48 −8 −17	39 −7 −17	32 0 −10	33 11 0	46 20 7	66 25 12	55 26 14	58 24 12	51 17 7	58 9 1	52 −1 −8	51 −7 −21
- █ Average max. and min. temperatures in °C
- █ Precipitation totals in mm

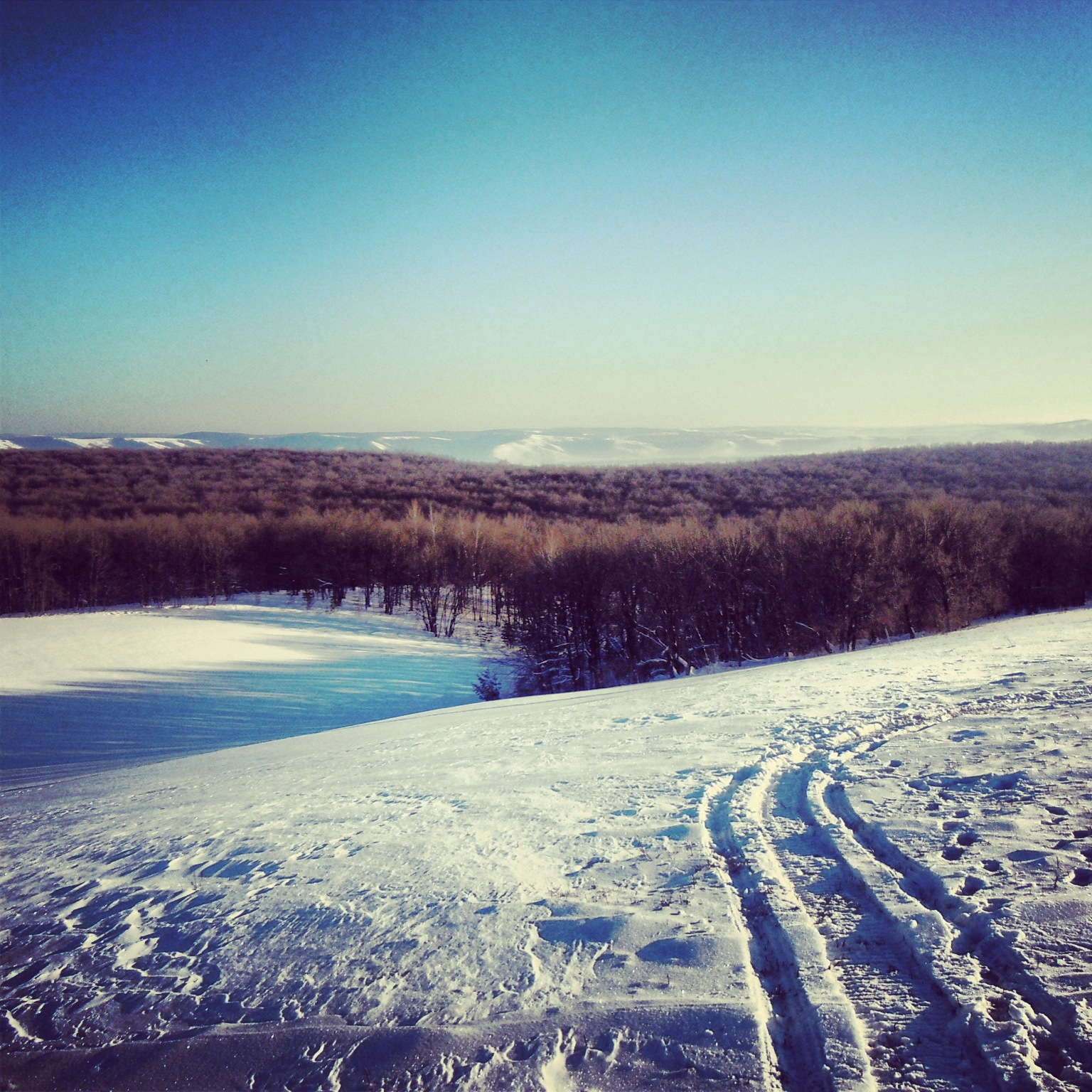
Park in winter

Bashkiriya is in the Urals montane tundra and taiga ecoregion. The Urals are commonly recognized as the divide between Europe and Asia, and the southern Urals combine the mixing of the two with proximity to steppe ecoregions. The primary trees of the Urals Mountain Taiga ecoregion include the Siberian Spruce, Siberian larch, Russian larch, and the Siberian fir.

== Plants ==
The park has high levels of biodiversity because it is at the meeting point of several biogeographical provinces: boreal conifer forests ("taiga"), broadleaf forests, and steppe. Because over 90% of the park has forest cover, it is an area of broad protection for forest plant communities. The light conifers of the taiga (pine and larch) mix with broadleaf (linden, oak, elm, maple) and small-leaved (birch and aspen) trees. Rocky outcrops provide openings for smaller flowering plants. Over 800 flowering plant species have been recorded in the park, with 117 being listed as rare or vulnerable. There are limited non-forest areas of the park, including an areas known as the "Bear Meadow" that features lop-sided onion, a type of wild onion.

== Animals ==
Due to the position of the forest on the extreme ends of different ecoregions (Europe/Asia, and North/South), many of the resident species are at the extreme ends of their respective ranges. The protected areas of the park provide habitat for over 60 species of mammals. Representative species include the brown bear, elk, wolf, lynx and beaver. There are 11 recorded amphibian species, 30 fish species and 150 species of birds. The birds of prey include the vulnerable Eastern imperial eagle and the White-tailed eagle (the largest eagle with a wingspan up to 8 feet). Among the fish species in the headwaters of the Nugush and Belaya is the vulnerable Siberian salmon.

== History ==
The Bashkiriya region has been inhabited for thousands of years: the cave paintings of the Paleolithic culture in the bordering Shulgan-Tash reserve have been dated by radio-chemical analysis to 13,000-14,000 years ago. The semi-nomadic Bashkirs are indigenous to Bashkortostan and claim descent from the original cave cult cultures.

The area was well known for wild beekeeping, in which honey is collected from tree hollows, and in which bee clusters would be artificially introduced into caverns. The neighboring Altyn-Solok entomological reserve protects this historic source of industry, which may stretch back 1,500 years.

In the 20th century, the region of Bashkiriya between the Volga and the Urals became the most industrialized and populous republic in Russia. The upland area around Bashkiriya National Park and its related reserves remained relatively undisturbed y development and population, increasing their importance for both recreation and natural protection.

Today, the park known for local recreational use of the Nugush Reservoir in the summer, and for explorations into the forest by trail, river raft, and horseback. Caving is also a feature of the park. There are tourist facilities near the reservoir, and in the nearby town of Meleuz.

== See also ==
- Protected areas of Russia
- WikiCommons gallery: Kuperlya waterfall and karst bridge
