= Shulgan-Tash Cave =

Cave and archaeological site in Bashkortostan, Russia

- Шүлгәнташ (Bashkir)
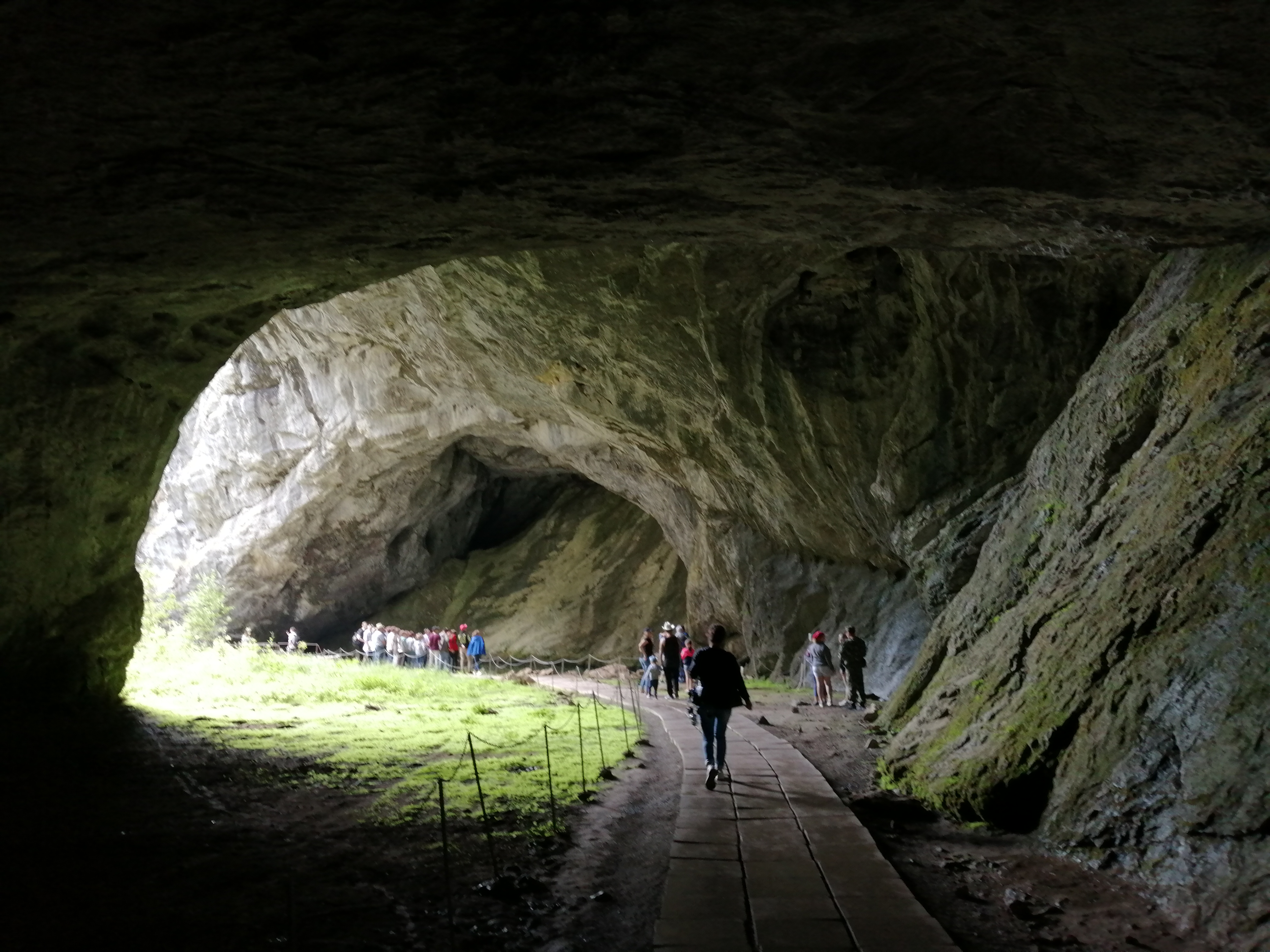
- Entrance to Shulgan-Tash Cave

- Location in Russia
- 53°2′39.9″N 57°3′50″E
- Type: limestone cave
- Periods: Paleolithic
- Location: Burzyansky District
- Region: Bashkortostan, Russia

UNESCO World Heritage Site
- Official name: Rock Paintings of Shulgan-Tash Cave
- Criteria: Cultural: (iii)
- Reference: 1743
- Inscription: 2025 (47th Session)

Shulgan-Tash Cave (Bashkir: Шүлгәнташ, romanized: Şölgəntaş, [ʃɵl.ɣæn.ˈtʰɑʂ]), also known as Kapova Cave (Russian: Капова пещера, romanized: Kapova peshchera), is a limestone karst cave in the Burzyansky District of Bashkortostan, Russia. It is located in the southern Ural Mountains, on the Belaya River in the Shulgan-Tash Nature Reserve, approximately 200 km (120 mi) south-east of Ufa.

The cave is best known for the Upper Paleolithic rock paintings and drawings (more than 190, mostly in a precarious state of preservation), including the only known prehistoric painting of a (two-humped) camel. They were added to the World Heritage List in 2025. Approximately 30–50 images are relatively well-preserved. The most famous of them—of mammoths, horses, rhinoceroses, bison, and a camel—are located quite far from the entrance (300 meters and more). These images are made with red ochre, sometimes with outlines in charcoal.

The current estimate for the age of the paintings, based on uranium-thorium dating, places them between approximately 14,500 and 36,400 years old. This range is derived from dating calcite flowstone underlying and overlying the paintings, with the oldest underlying calcite dated to 36.4±0.1 ka (thousand years ago) and the youngest overlying calcite dated to 14.5±0.04 ka. Radiocarbon dates from cultural layers in the cave suggest a narrower range of about 16,300 to 19,600 years ago.

The discovery of the Shulgan-Tash paintings in 1959 was significant because it extended the known range of Paleolithic cave painting outside Western Europe, challenging the long-held idea that such art was exclusive to Spain and France. The Serpievka group of caves (about 250 km from Shulgan-Tash) is the only one that contains ancient paintings to the north of Shulgan-Tash.

== Description ==
Today, this area of wild dense forest and high white rocks is home to deer, bear and the Bashkort bee. Around 10–20 thousand years ago, the climate and the landscape were different. Summer was short, while winter months were very long and cold, and the landscape was tundra. Humans sought shelter in clefts and caves among the rocks.

The entrance to the cave is situated on the southern slope of the Sarykuskan (Russian: Сарыкускан) mountain. The entrance forms a huge arch 30 m (98 ft) in height. To the left of the cave entrance is a lake from which the river Shul'gan (Russian: Шульган) originates. The underground Shul'gan (Russian: Подземный Шульган) river, which created the cave, flows through it. This three-story cave system is about 3 km (1.9 mi) long, with a depth of 165 m (541 ft) including siphon underwater cavities, large halls, galleries, underground lakes, and the river.

The mouth of Shulgan-Tash Cave is called the Portal. Deep in the Portal lies the source of the Shul'gan, emerging from underground and forming a pool named Blue Lake. Below 33 meters in depth, it joins a gigantic underground water cavity.

A passageway leads from the Portal to a succession of ground-level halls. First comes the Main Gallery, followed by the Stalagmite Hall. Continuing northwards, one enters the Dome Hall and the Hall of the Signs. At the far end lies the Hall of Chaos. The halls differ in size and shape: the Main gallery and the Hall of Chaos are oblong, while the Stalagmite and the Dome Halls are circular, whereas the Hall of the Signs is rectangular. Their length reaches 90 m, width 20–30 m, and the height 7–20 m. The halls are connected by tunnels of various lengths and shapes; some have clumpy blockages. Air from the outside reaches the Main Gallery and, to an extent, the Stalagmite Hall. However, in the Dome Hall and onwards, the air is stagnant in both winter and summer. Stalactites and stalagmites become more common as one advances deeper into the cave. The walls are covered with calcareous sinter, which can be as much as half a metre thick. Some of the calcite stones are intricately shaped.

Vestigial traces of prehistoric man's life can be found in the ground level halls. On the walls of the Middle Dome hall, one can plainly discern spots of spread red paint as well as some geometrical figures – the signs. In the neighbouring Hall of the Signs, the number of such figures considerably increases. On the cave floor in the corner of the Hall of Chaos, the archaeologist Shchelinsky discovered remnants of a fire and vestigial traces of ancient people's activity.

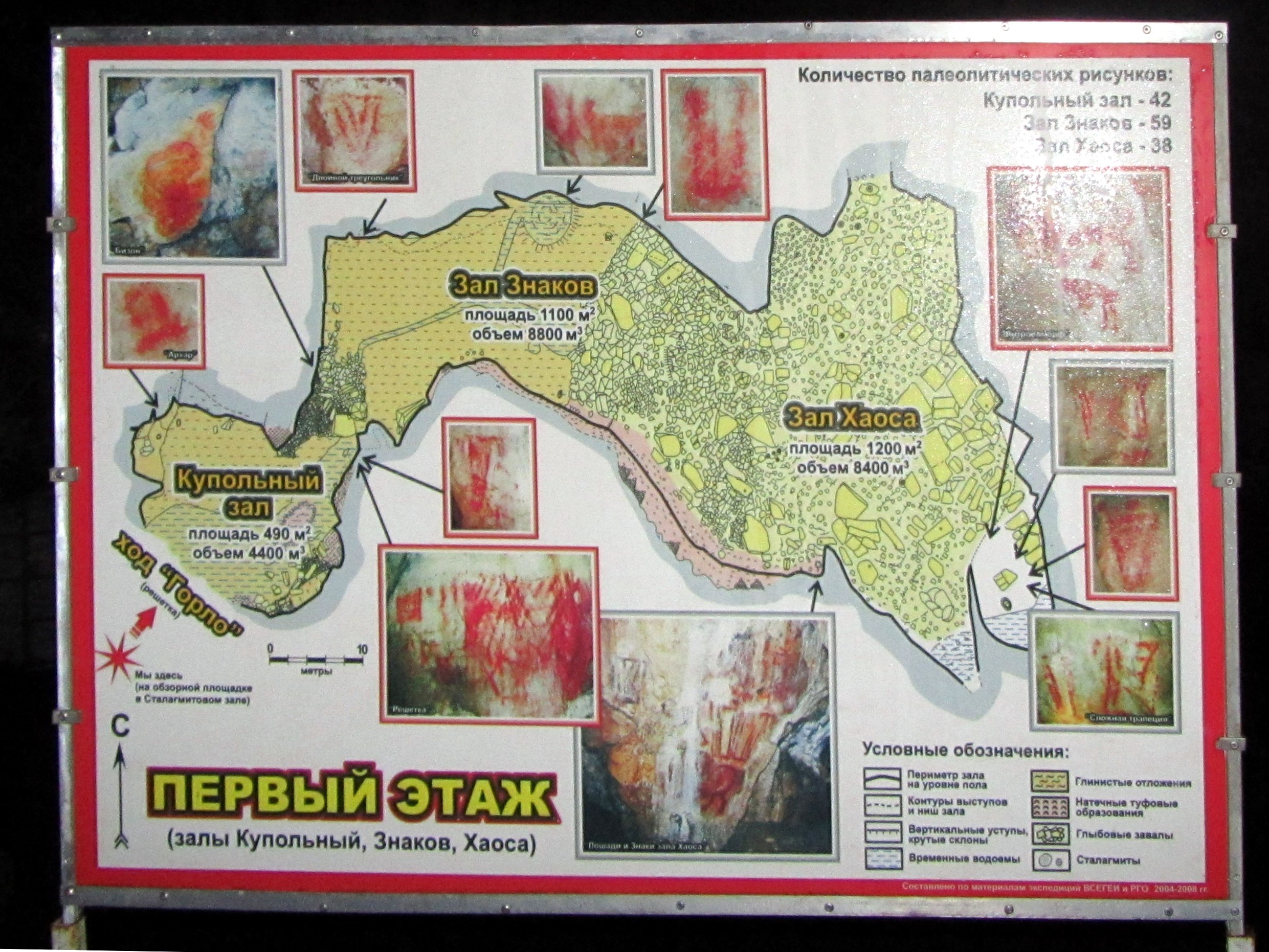
Scheme of the first floor of the cave

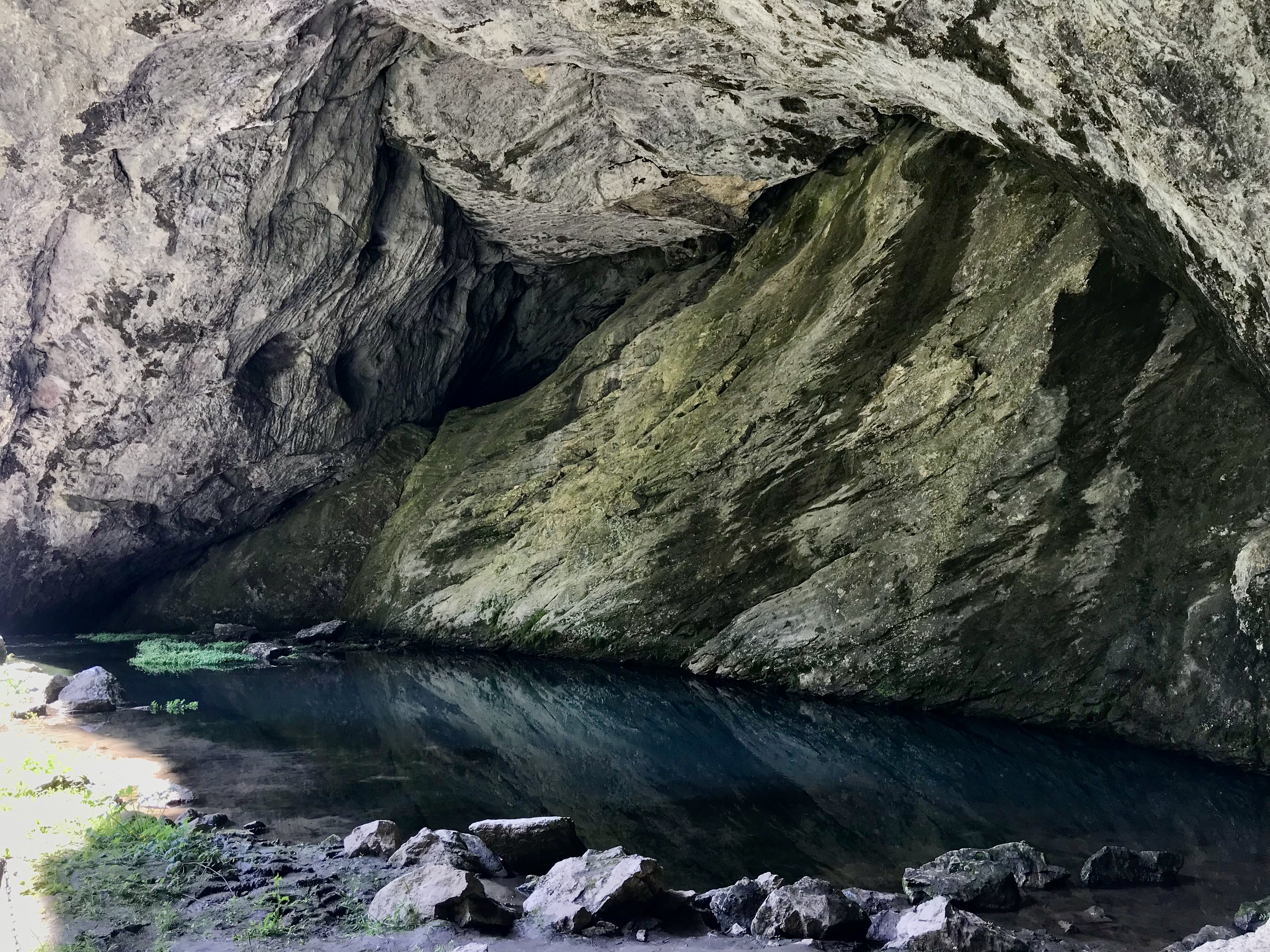
Underground lake in the cave

Due to the density of drawings, the Hall of Chaos may be called the "museum" of the ground-level part of the cave. On its walls, one can see a two-coloured picture of long-haired horses, along with a trapezoidal geometric figure; a little further, a group of geometrical signs are present.

The picture of a human-like creature, the only one in Shulgan-Tash Cave, is also to be found in the Hall of Chaos. For many centuries, all the drawings have been covered with a semi-transparent calcite crust. The expedition headed by the prominent archaeologist O. N. Bader cleaned the pictures of the horses in 1976. In order to ascend to the upper tier of the cave, one has to return to the Stalagmite Hall, where there is a hole in the roof leading upwards. A steel ladder has been installed to reach the hole in the roof; it is followed by a sloped path, leading to another ladder, this one 16 meters long, which takes visitors to the upper level.

Having climbed the ladder, visitors find themselves in a long and high hall, which is called the First Gallery, the first of a succession of upper-level halls. Moving further northwards, one then crosses the small Antechamber Hall in order to enter the most famous hall of the Shulgantash: the Hall of the Drawings.

Beyond the Hall of the Drawings, there are 14 more large and small halls accessible to visitors: the Second Gallery, the Acoustic Hall, the Oval Hall, the Hall Temple, the Upper and Diamond Halls, the Hall of Upper Lake (with a large lake in it), the Rainbow and the Crystal halls, the Hall of the Mountain King, the Gallery Hall, the Hall of the Abyss, the Transsyphon Hall, and the Far Hall.

The way to the more remote halls is rather complicated, with many dangerous sections and pools blocking the trail. In the Transsyphon Hall, one can see an underground section of the River Shulgan. Beyond the Far Hall, there is a cavity filled with water: a siphon. The speleologist and scuba diver Vladimir Kiselyov once traveled as far as 317 meters northwards inside the siphon before returning, having found no end to it.

A prominent feature in the Crystal Hall is the silvery fringe of calcite icicles hanging from the ceiling. Among the decorations of the cave are "milky rivers" composed of tiny fragile calcite crystals, which have not become solid yet.

Streams in the cave sometimes make small funnels in the halls on the floor, revealing grains of cave pearl, whereas on the walls there is a crust of marble onyx, in some places half a metre deep. Marble onyx is a type of marble frequently found in limestone caves.

== The Hall of the Drawings ==
The most ancient drawings are in the upper tier. They were painted in the Late Paleolithic era, when Cro-Magnons lived on the planet. The lower tier of the Kapova cave hosts later images from the end of the last ice age. Their size varies between 44 and 112 centimeters.

In January 1959, Alexander Ryumin, a senior researcher at the Pribelsky branch of the Bashkiriya Nature Reserve, discovered drawings made by ancient people on the walls of Shulgan-Tash Cave. Ryumin, having gone underground in search of bats, found colorful wall pictures of various animals – horses, rhinos, and mammoths. This became a world sensation. Scientists of that time believed that drawings of fossil animals of the Paleolithic era were characteristic only of Western Europe – such ancient cave paintings had previously only been found in France and Spain. From that moment on, the Kapova cave acquired the status of an important historical and cultural complex, which is unrivaled in Eastern Europe.

The best composition is on the right half of the eastern wall. In the centre of the composition, within the reach of the ancient painter's hand, is a drawing of an animal, "Ryumin's horse", the first picture discovered in Shulgan-tash Cave. Next are the pictures of several mammoths and a rhinoceros. All the animals are shown walking from right to left, except for one small mammoth standing or going in the opposite direction. On the opposite wall there is a bison or a bull, and mammoths with a calf. In this hall one can also see a trapezoidal shape painted with strange lines and signs inside the figure, and unusual ears at the top. Such geometrical signs repeatedly occur in the drawings of Shulgan-Tash Cave.

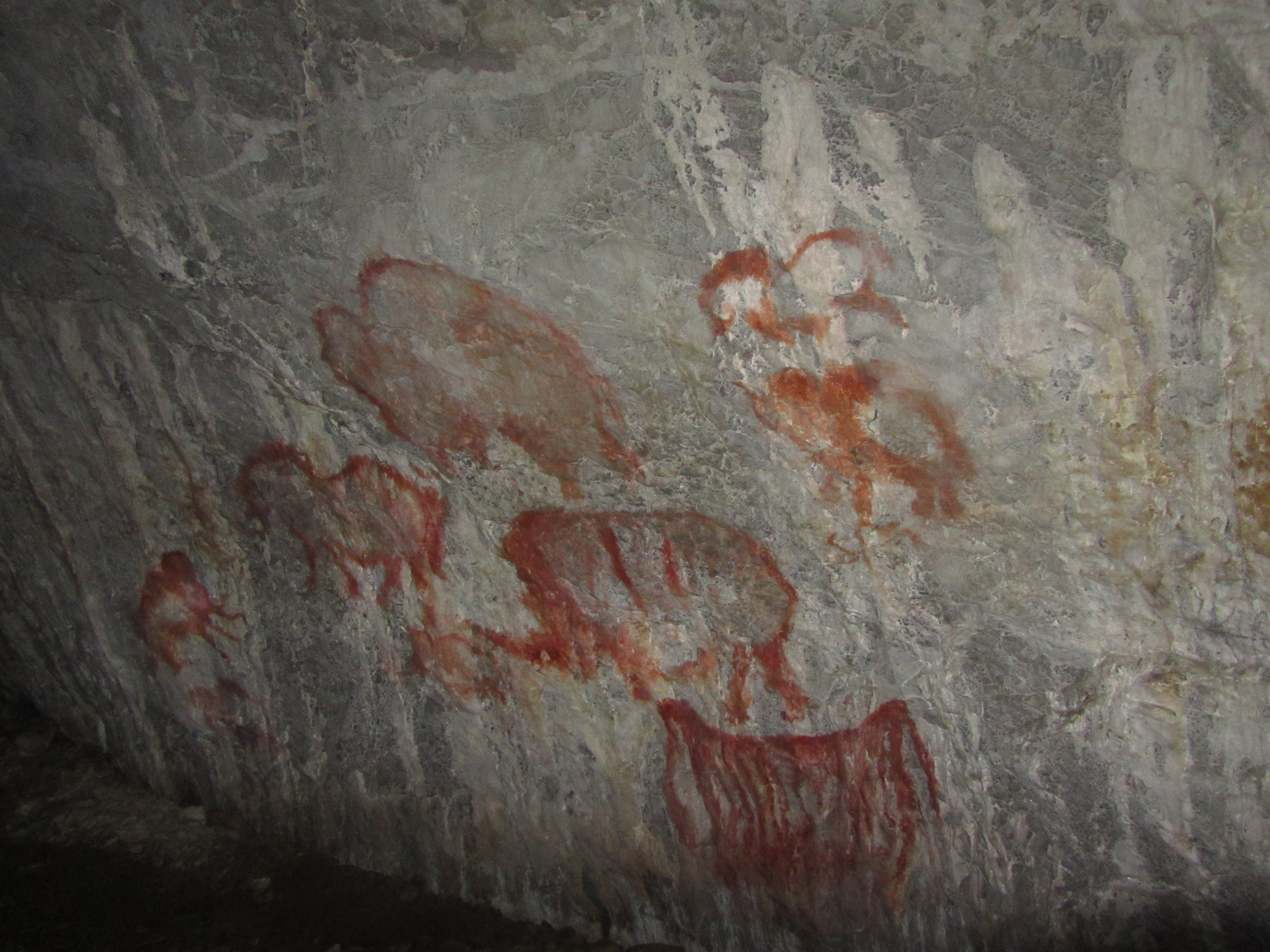
Rock paintings in the cave

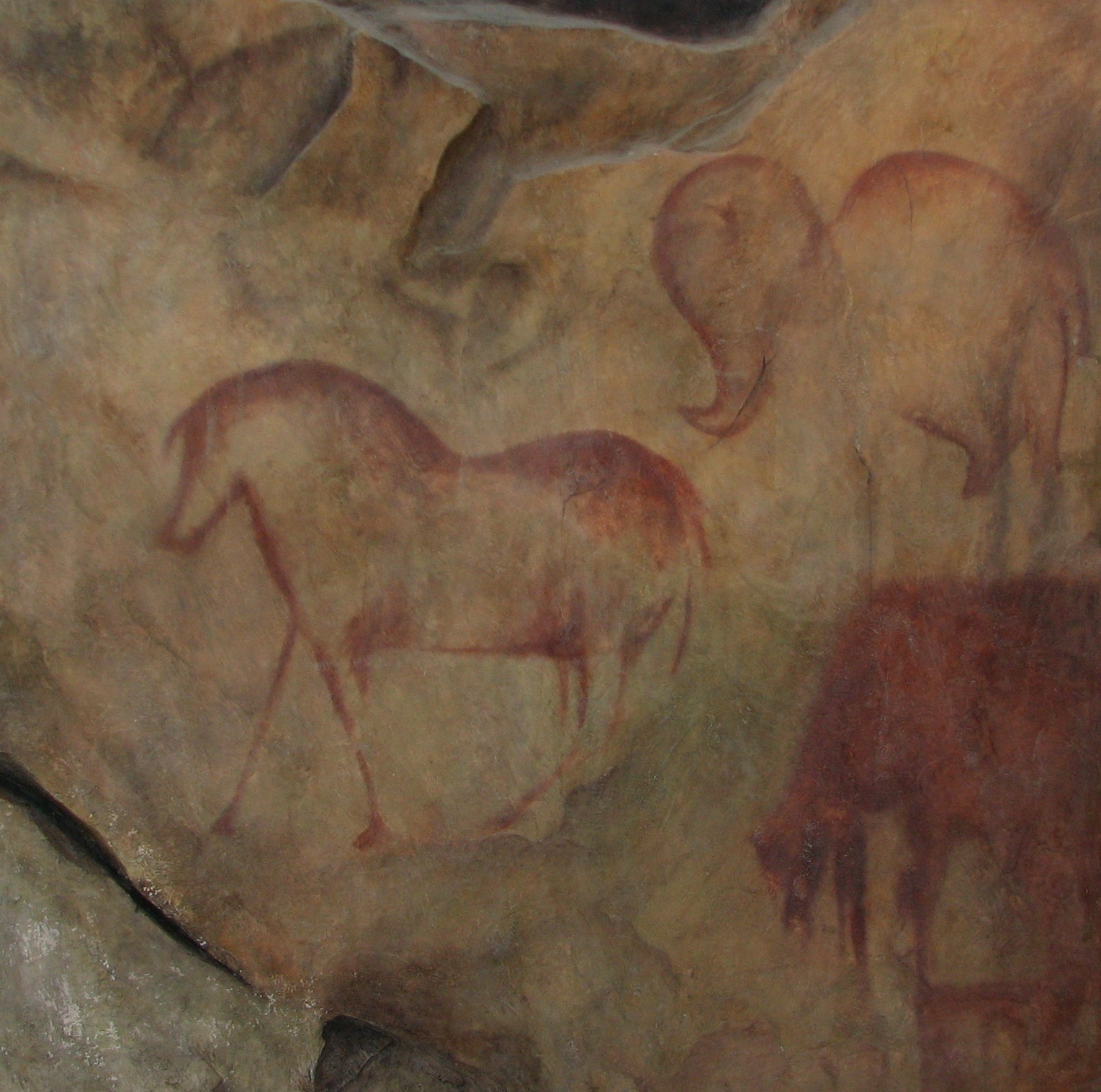
Paintings in the cave (replica)

== Discovery and excavation ==
Local people were afraid to visit the cave.

The first written information on Shulgan-Tash Cave appeared in January 1760. During a visit to Bashkiria, Pyotr Rychkov was told about the cave. He provided a detailed description of the cave's ground-level part in his article "Description of a cave located in the Orenburg province near the Belaya River, which of all the caves in Bashkiria are the most glorious and revered" (in his book Compositions and translations for the benefit and amusement of employees – «Сочинения и переводы к пользе и увеселению служащих», 1760).

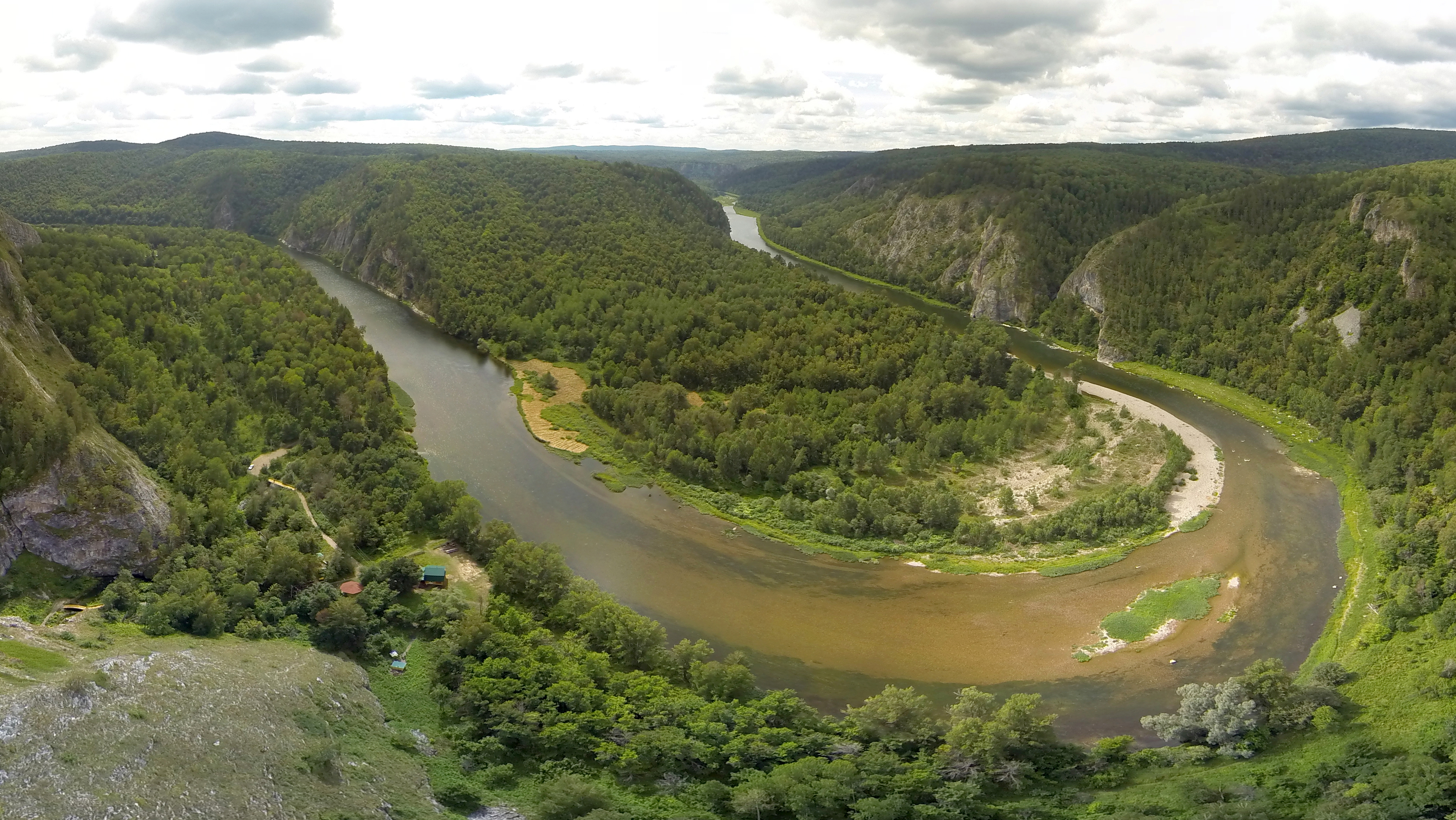
Natural scenery near the cave

Ten years later (1770), the cave was explored by Ivan Lepyokhin, who studied the upper level and gave a vivid picture of it in his travel diary. Lepyokhin suggested that the word "Kapova" comes from the dripping water within the cave (kapat being the Russian word for "to drip").

In the middle and later half of the 19th century, Shulgan-Tash Cave was studied by a number of travelers and explorers (e.g., by geologists N. G. Myaglitsky and A. I. Antipov in 1858). The local forester Fyodor Simon occasionally organized excursions to the cave.

In 1896, the lower floor of the cave was examined by members of the Orenburg branch of the Russian Geographical Society, D. Sokolov, I. Zanevsky, and F. Simon, who mapped a plan of the entrance part of the lower level and compiled a protocol for its inspection and measurement. Researchers noted that the description of P. I. Rychkov is in full agreement "with the actual state of the cave: in all the indicated places everything that he noted was found".

In 1923, the geologist and scientist G. V. Vakhrushev explored the cave up to the Upper Lake. He made a roughly sketched map of the interior and issued a small book, The Enigmas of Kapova Cave. In 1931, he came to the cave again, clarified information about the cave, and described the surroundings of the cave. He also wrote about various legends of the Shulgan-Tash cave.

In 1960, a group of Moscow archaeologists headed by Otto Bader started working in the cave. Over his entire work, he uncovered more than 30 drawings, including mammoths, horses, rhinos, bison, and geometric shapes. The drawings were cleaned from the calcite crust and mud, photographed, and thoroughly examined. They were judged to date back to late Paleolithic period (25–10 thousand years BCE). The main result of this long research was his book Kapova Cave: Paleolithic Painting, published in 1965. Bader believed that all the drawings represent a single complex executed at the same time.

During this period, the study of Shulgan-Tash Cave itself was carried out by employees of Bashkir State University, under the direction of E. D. Bogdanovich and I. I. Kudryasheva. They compiled a detailed map of the cave. The first microclimatic observations were carried out, and distant, generally inaccessible areas were examined.

After the death of Otto Bader in 1979, research in the cave stopped. There were problems preserving the prehistoric paintings, and so it was decided to completely close the cave. Work in the cave was resumed only in 1982 by Leningrad archaeologist V.E. Shchelinsky. At that time, he led a comprehensive Paleolithic expedition that conducted archaeological research in the Southern Urals annually.

V. E. Shchelinsky discovered various artifacts left behind by ancient humans under the ancient drawings and suggested that they belong to the Paleolithic era. He believed that a significant part of the cave's drawings is combined into compositions reflecting the mythological beliefs of the ancient artists. For the first time, a well-defined cultural layer of the Upper Paleolithic era was identified, dated by the time about 14,000 BCE. Traced focal spots indicate the use of open fire by the ancient inhabitants. Various artifacts were identified, including a clay fat lamp, stone tools (mostly flint), pieces of ochre, jewelry in the form of beads and pendants made of stone and small shells of fossil mollusks, and bones of animals of the Ice Age – mammoth, cave bear, fox, hare, marmot, pika, and jerboa were found.

Archaeologist V. N. Shirokov from Yekaterinburg believed that Shulgan-Tash Cave was a sanctuary.

I. V. Kiselev executed a comprehensive study of Shulgan-Tash Cave In 1991. He made dives on the underground river Shulgan.

V. G. Kotov explored the cave and believed that Shulgan-Tash Cave was a cult center for the peoples of the Southern Urals, where rites of initiation and rebirth of nature were performed. V. G. Kotov and V. N. Shirokov believed that the activity in the cave at that time was associated with initiation rituals.

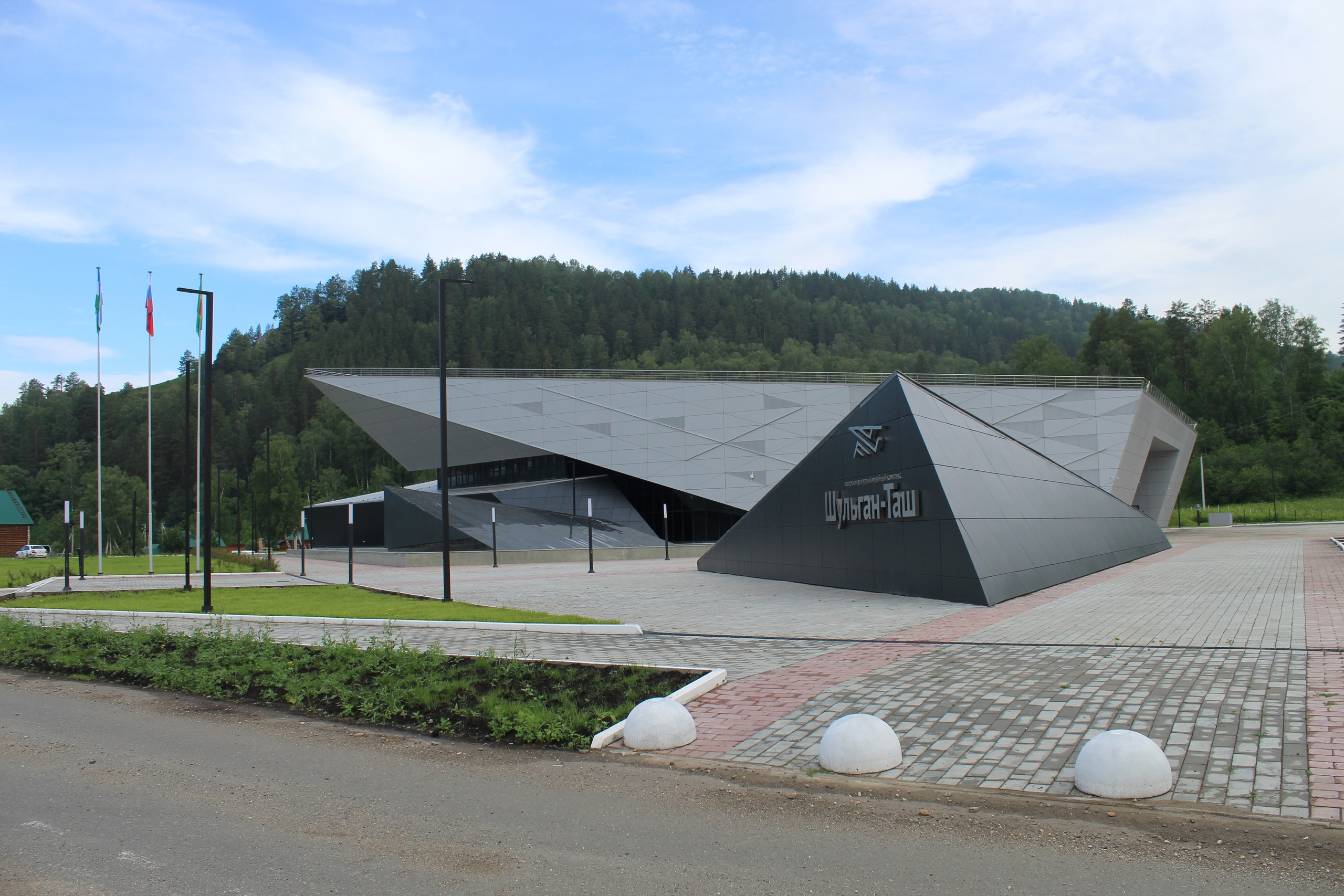
The museum centre near the entrance to the cave (opened in 2022)

Yuri Lyakhnitsky made a detailed and accurate map of the Shulgan-Tash Cave massif. In 2002, he identified new drawings – the "pale mammoth", alongside a drawing of a man and the silhouette of another mammoth.

Today, Shulgan-Tash Cave is being thoroughly studied and documented.

== Bashkort legends and traditions ==
The heart of the South Urals with Lake Shulgan and the sources of legendary rivers Aghidel, Yaiyk, Hakmar, and Nogosh is associated with the lives and deeds of the immortal heroes of the epic poems Ural Batyr and Аkbuthat (Akbuzat) which belong to the world art treasures. For ancient Bashkorts, the area was the centre of the Earth, where celestial, natural, and underwater worlds could interact and interpenetrate.

There exists a significant amount of folklore related to the Shulgan-Tash Cave. The most striking thing is that the main actions in many ancient tales and other folklore works are tied to Shulgan-Tash Cave or the Shulgan lake as soon as possible. And it is no coincidence that both the cave and the lake in them carry the name of the owner of the underworld (underwater king) Shulgan.

Shulgan is one of the major negative characters of Bashkir epic poetry (such as Ural-Batyr, Akbuzat, Kara-Yurga, Akhak Kola, and others). According to legend, Lake Shulgan formed from the remnants of the Flood Sea, arranged by the Div (Giant) and Shulgan after being hit by the staff of the earth. One such account is found in Akbuzat, which states: "When the water padishah (King) lost the battle, he found a bottomless pool and dived into this lake. The lake became known as SHULGAN."

The epics Akbuzat and the Ural-Batyr describe sacrifice of a human to Lake Shulgan. A beautiful girl was presented to the padishah of the underwater (underground) world (Rychkov found a "dry human head" while visiting the cave in 1760).

In many legends and traditions of the Bashkirs, Lake Shulgan plays a prominent role. For instance, all events in Akbuzat are developed exactly around this lake. On the surface of the lake at full moon appears the girl Narcas in the image of the gold duck. A young hunter, Haoban, receives a gift from her: the horse Akbuzat (Toolpar with wings) and countless herds of livestock. The only condition for Haoban is that he is forbidden from turning back to look at the lake after receiving his gifts. However, afraid of the storm caused by the animals' emergence from Lake Toolpar, Haoban looked back, and the animals all disappeared into the lake again.

The action of another legend, Kungyr Buga, also occurs by Lake Shulgan. In this tale, the hero Batyr finds Minei, the missing daughter of an old couple, in Lake Shulgan. Minei had been kidnapped by an aquatic being that ruled the lake. Batyr descends into the underwater kingdom, cuts down all seven heads of the monster, and takes the girls, people, and cattle to the ground.

The motives for horses and cattle living on the lake, and their partial disappearance in this same lake, are distributed in numerous Bashkir legends.

A legend about Yelkysykkan-kul lake, from which horses have come out, is widely known in the Burzyan district. This legend (by M. V. Lossievsky) tells about the hero Bishlak, who met a wanderer while hunting in the surroundings of Lake Shulgan. The wanderer asked Bishlak to give him his dog, offering a herd of horses in return. Byshlak was supposed to drive forward without looking back. But out of curiosity, he looked around, and half the herd returned to the lake. The hunter became a rich man, and his descendants (tribe) from his time are called Bayulins (rich). From this herd came the breed of gray horses. And the lake got the name Yelkysykkan – lake where the horses went out. By the text of description this lake complies with the lake of karst origin near the Shulgan-Tash cave (named the lake Shulgan).

In folk traditions, Lake Shulgan is frequently the birthplace of miraculous horses. For instance, in one version of the legend of Akhak Kola, the appearance of the leader of the herd Akhak Kola is described as follows: "Shulgan came to the lake. But he managed to catch only the foal – the mare dived back into the lake, but this foal became lame (from here and her name: "Akhak Kola" – the lame light yellow horse with a black tail).

Legends related to the cave personalize an external force. The cave environment is more severe and incomprehensible than most other natural environments. Vladimir Dal, who visited the Orenburg province as an official, collected works of oral culture, particularly Bashkir folklore. He characterized Shulgan-Tash Cave according to Bashkir tales and legends. There are genies, dives (дивы, fantastic creatures), and a stone dog. It is said that the dog is afraid of whips: if one hits it a hundred times with a whip, it will rain.

According to P. I. Rychkov, Bashkirs (Bashkorts) usually hid here their families and horses during wars and their uprisings. The cattle naturally stayed in the lower floor of the cave, and women, children, and old men went upstairs. Food was always stored here.
