= Pribelsky =

Pribelsky Прибельский
- Selo
- Location within Bashkortostan Location within Russia
- Coordinates: 54°22′N 56°26′E
- Country: Russia
- Region: Bashkortostan
- District: Karmaskalinsky District
- Time zone: UTC+5:00

Pribelsky (Russian: Прибельский) is a rural locality (a selo) and the administrative centre of Pribelsky Selsoviet, Karmaskalinsky District, Bashkortostan, Russia. The population was 4,859 as of 2010. There are 56 streets.

== Geography ==
Pribelsky is located 26 km east of Karmaskaly (the district's administrative centre) by road. Sart-Chishma is the nearest rural locality.
