= Akbuzat =

Bashkir epic poem

Akbuzat (Bashkir: Аҡбуҙат, romanized: Aqbuźat, from аҡбуҙ "blue-grey" and ат "horse") is the most famous kubair (epic poem) of the Bashkirs. It shows similarity to other epics (notably the story of Pegasus). The epic is also associated with the ice era ancient myth that involved the Shulgan-Tash Cave. It is part of the cycle of heroic legends involving the Ural-batyr and his descendants.

== Background ==
The recording of Akbuzat is attributed to the Baskir poet and folklorist Mukhametsha Abdrakhmanovich Burangoluv. He obtained information about the epic during a 1910 expedition to Itkul volost in the now Baimaksky district of the Bashkortostan. The researcher reportedly took more than a decade to process the Akbuzat materials, which he received from sesen-poets or singers-storytellers. This can be partly attributed to the pressure Burangoluv received from the Bolshevik regime. During World War II, the Central Committee of the Bolshevik Party accused him of distorting the history of the Bashkir people.

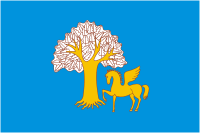
The Curly Horse of Akbuzat on the Flag of Kigi rayon

== Plot ==
The main hero of the epic poem Akbuzat is Hauban. He travels to the underwater kingdom Shulgen to search for the сurly horse Akbuzat and the diamond sword Ural-batyr. He destroys the kingdom, frees Akbuzat. Hauban then receives protection from the heavenly horse, which also transforms him completely, allowing him to defeat monsters of the lower world. After getting out of the water, he returns to liberate his people from slavery under Khan Masim.
