= Nugush (river) =

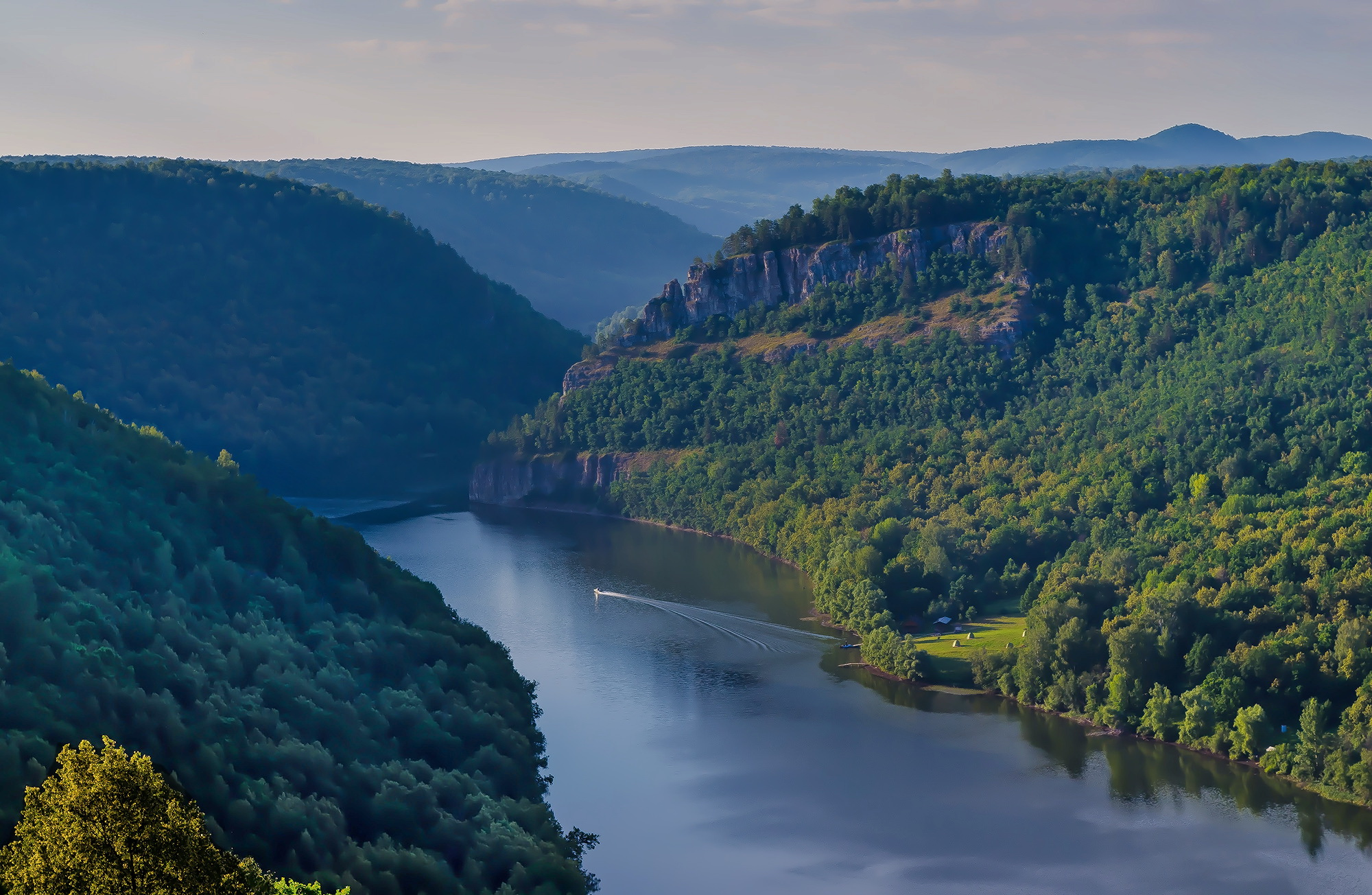
- Native name: Нугуш (Russian)

Location
- Country: Russia

Physical characteristics
- Mouth: Belaya
  - coordinates: 53°04′32″N 55°59′43″E
- Length: 235 km (146 mi)
- Basin size: 3,820 km^{2} (1,470 sq mi)

Basin features
- Progression: Belaya→ Kama→ Volga→ Caspian Sea

The Nugush (Russian: Нугуш, Nuguš; Bashkir: Нөгөш, Nögöş), also known as the Bolshoy Nugush (Russian: Большой Нугуш, Boljšoj Nuguš), is a river in Bashkortostan in Russia, a right tributary of the Belaya. The river is 235 kilometres (146 mi) long, and its drainage basin covers 3,820 square kilometres (1,470 mi^{2}). The Nugush freezes over in the first half of November and remains icebound until the second half of April.

== Nugush water reservoir storage ==
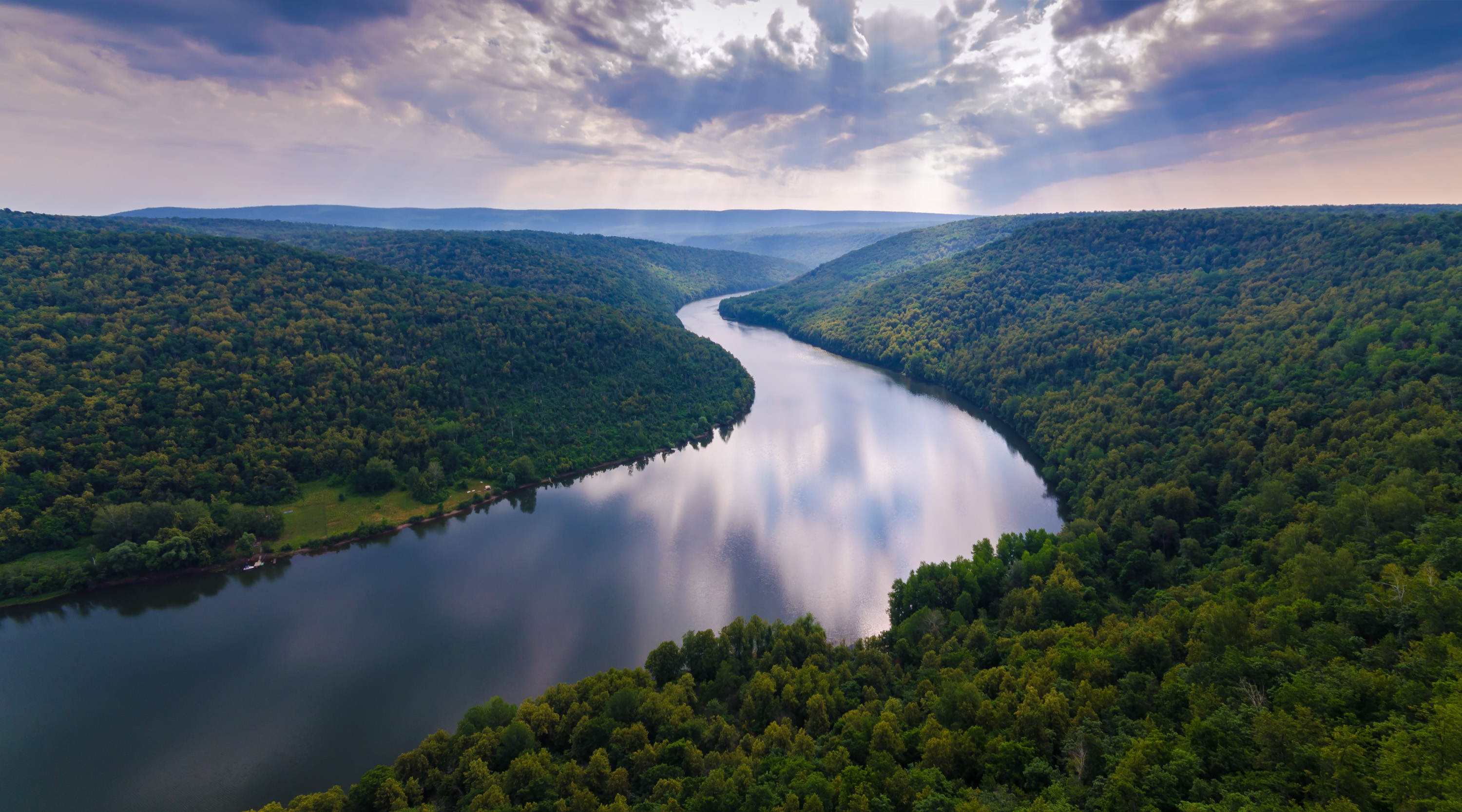

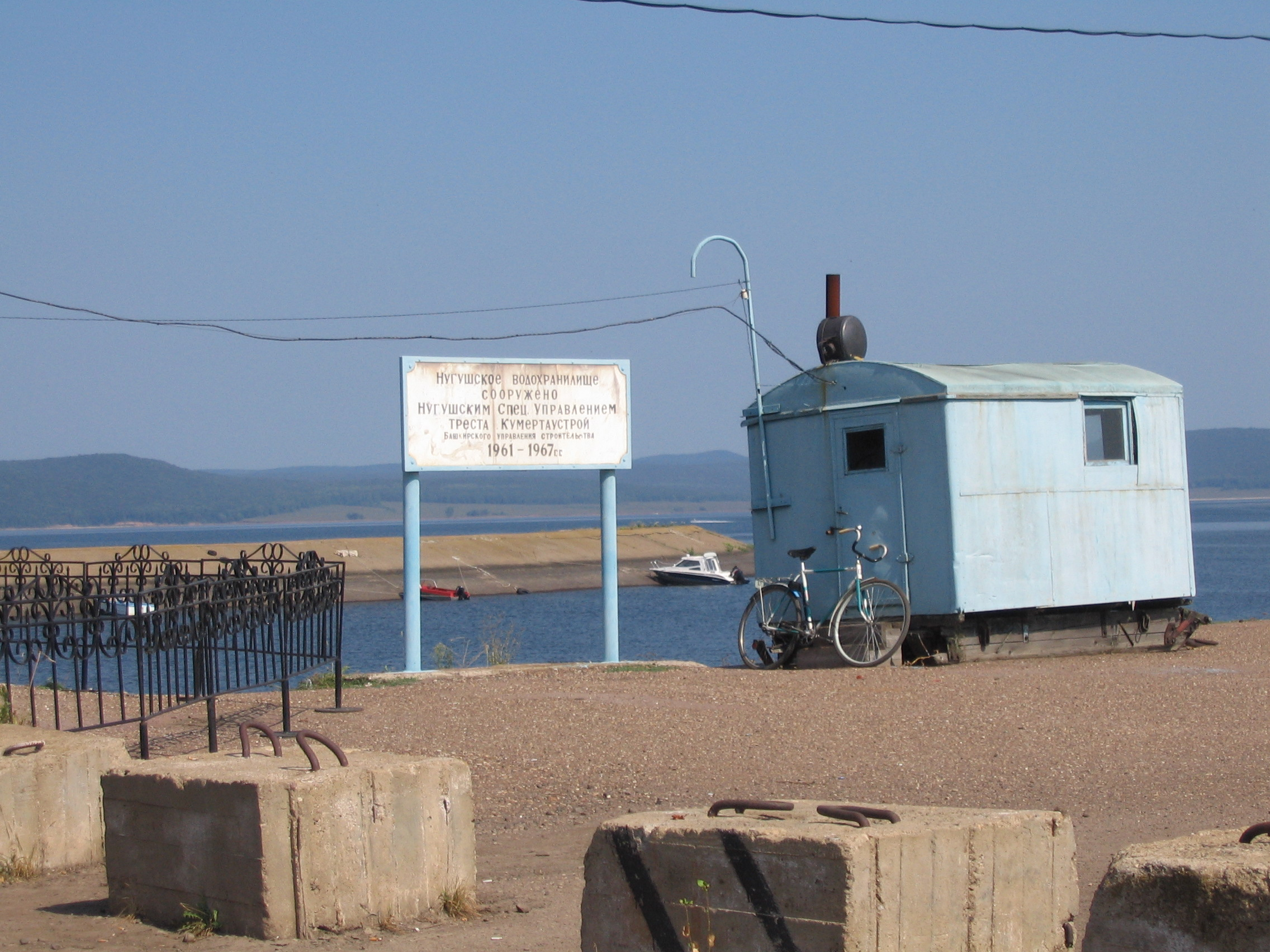

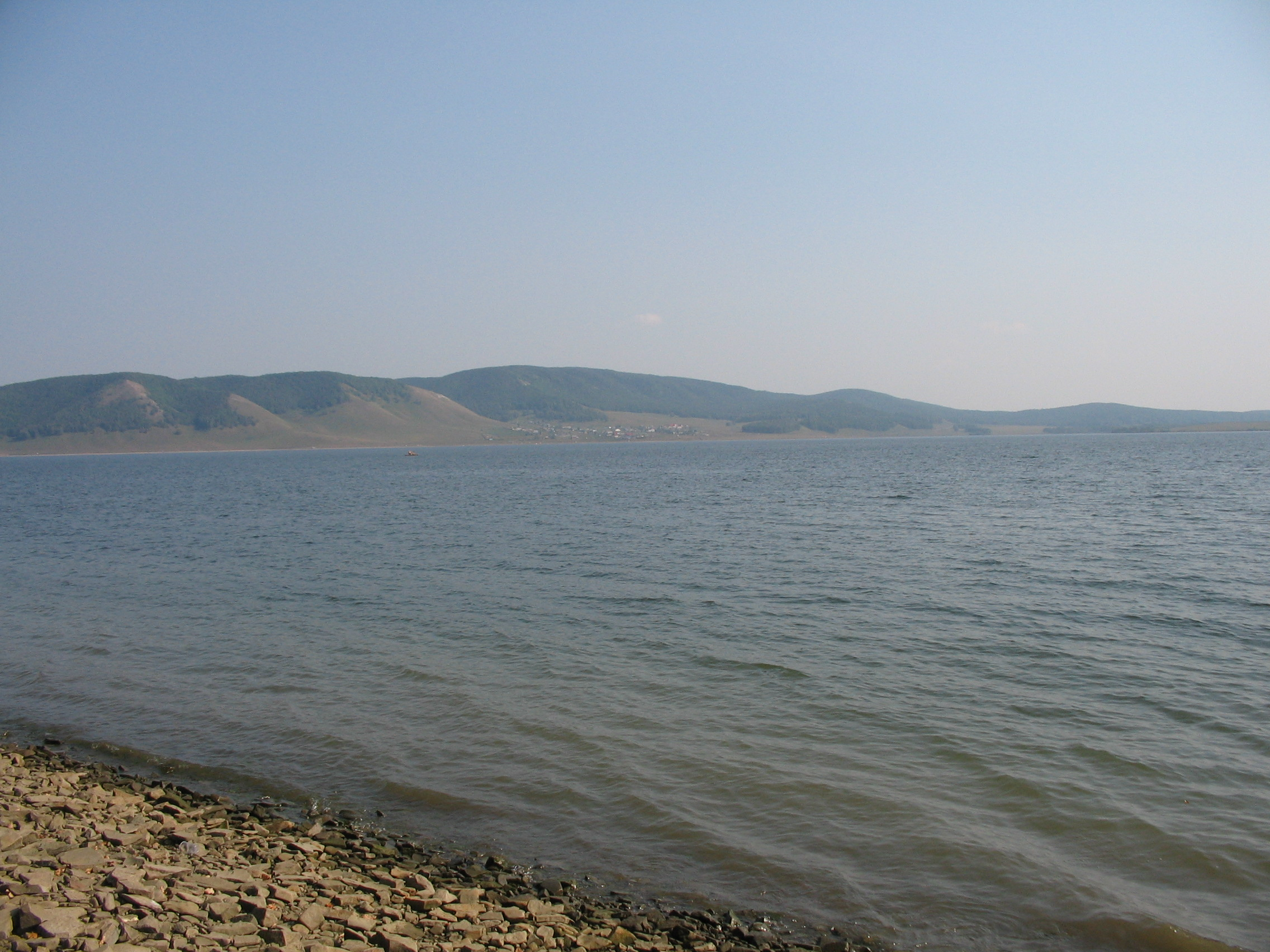

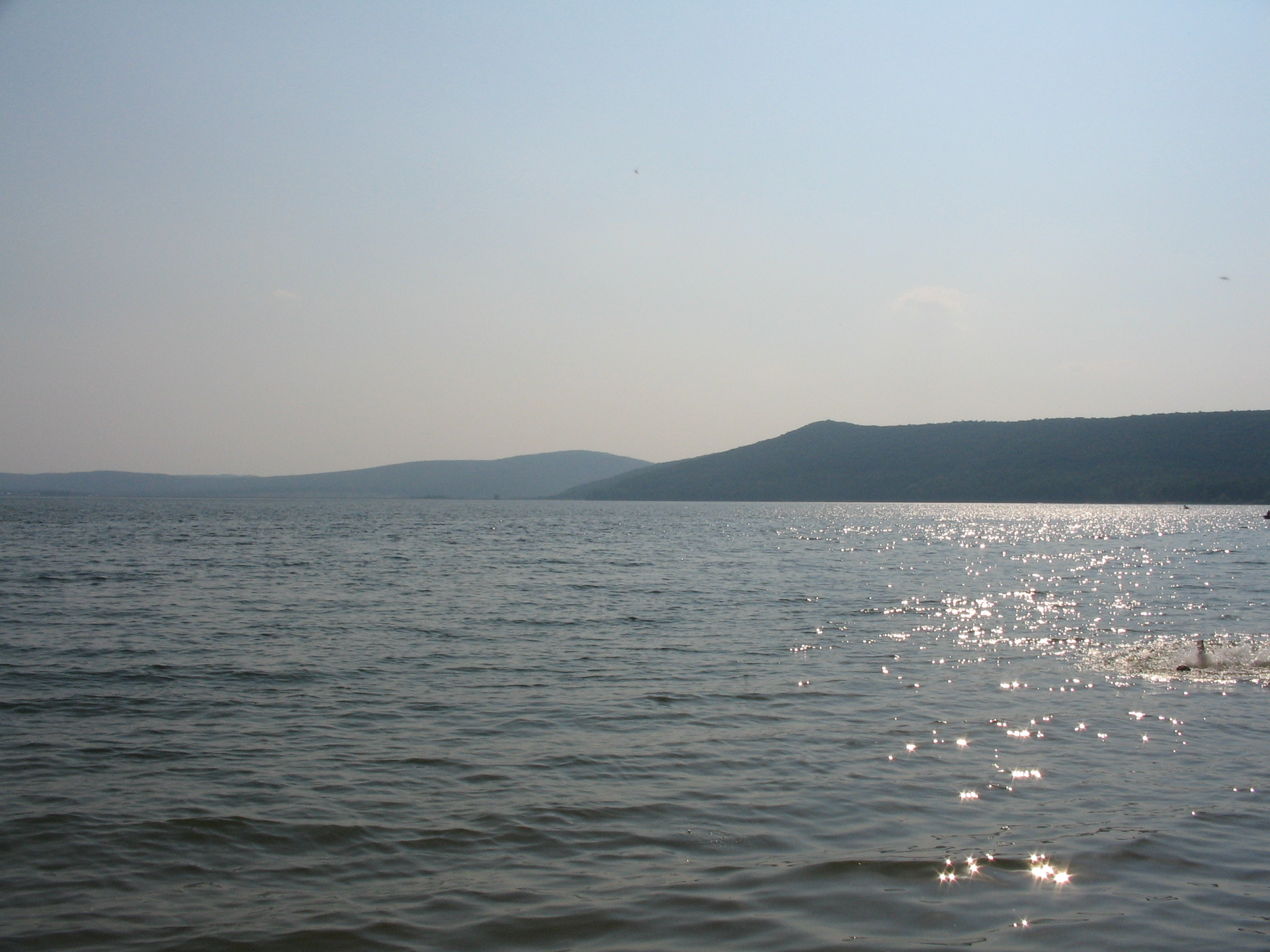

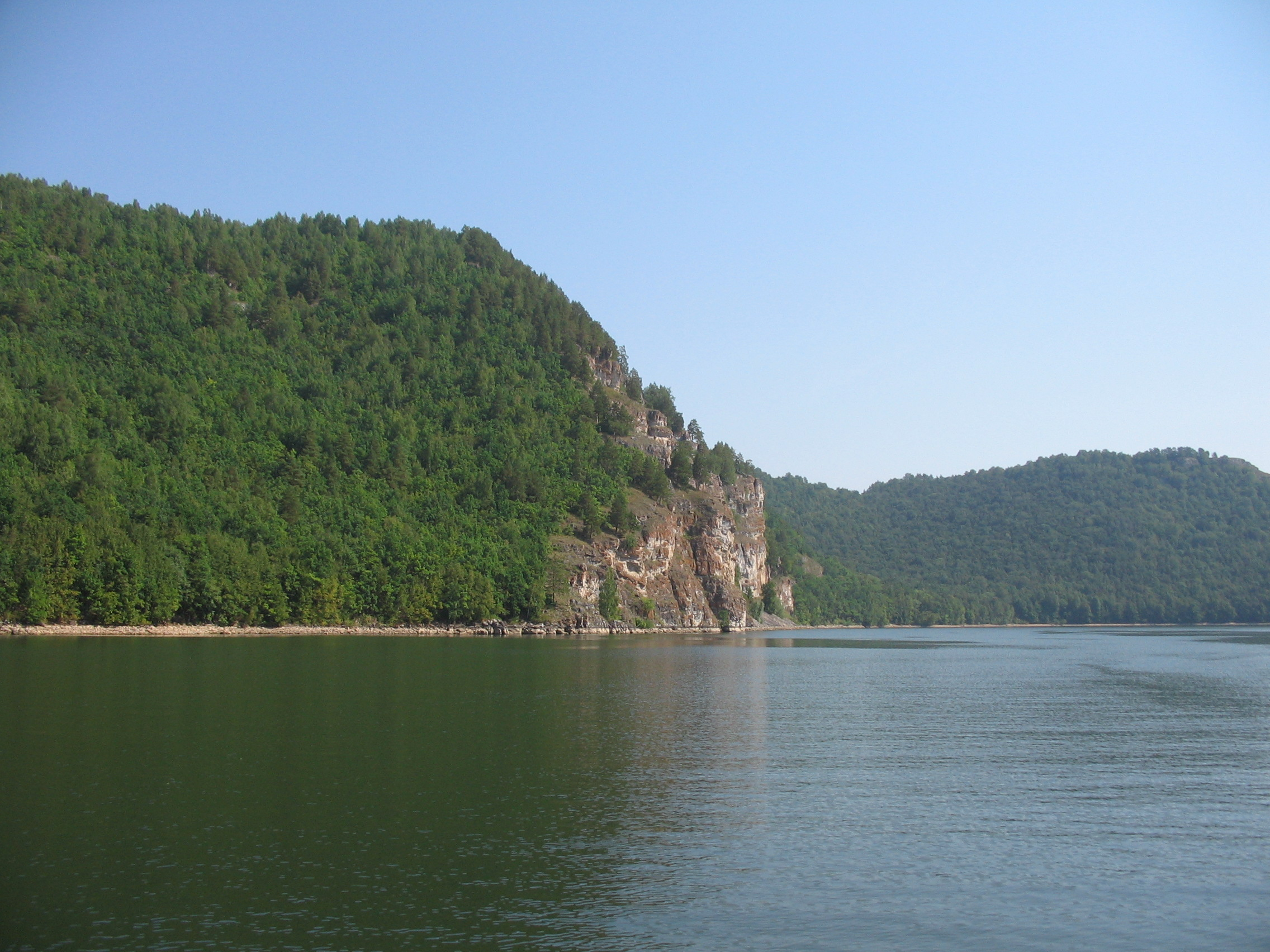

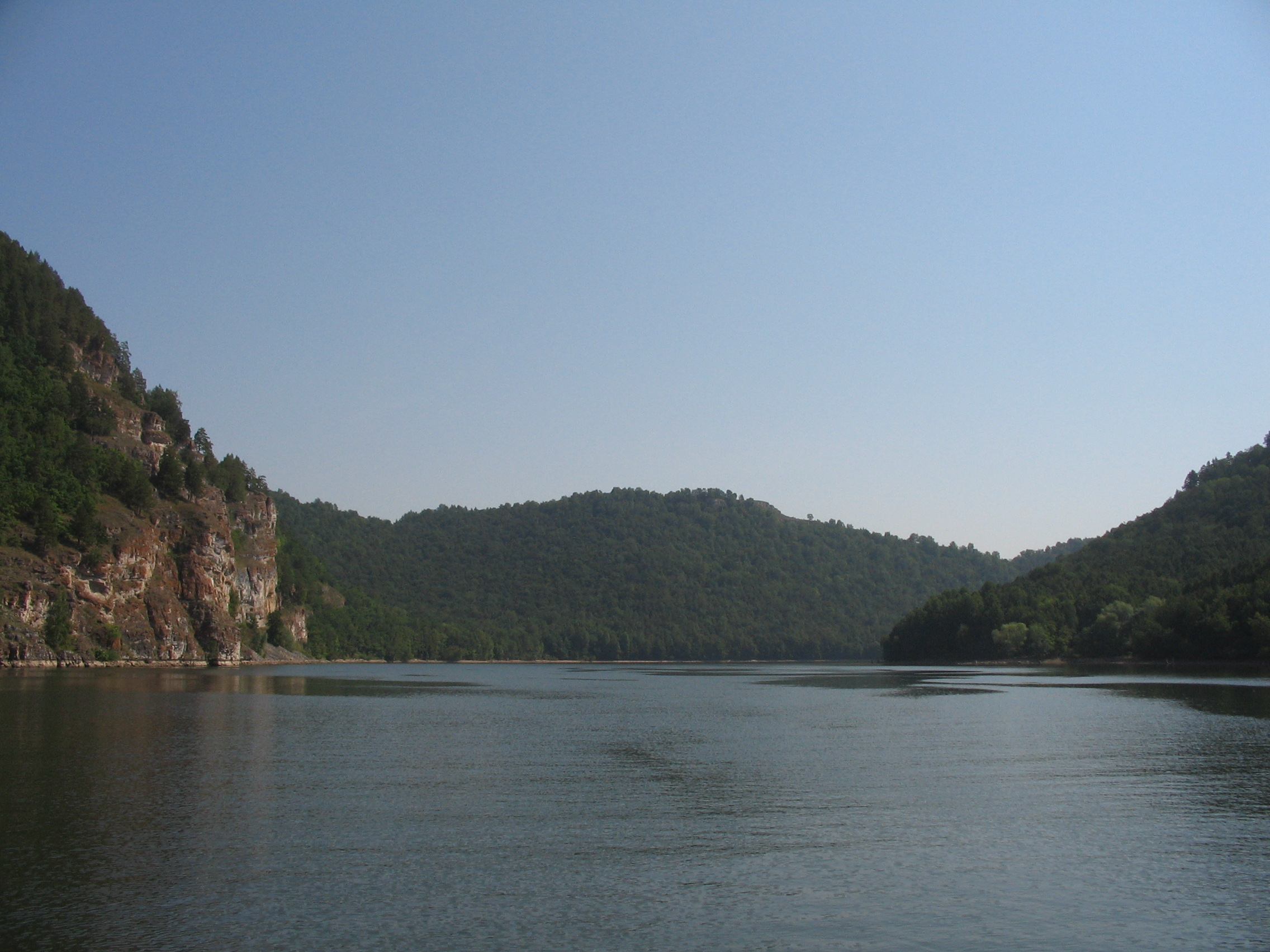

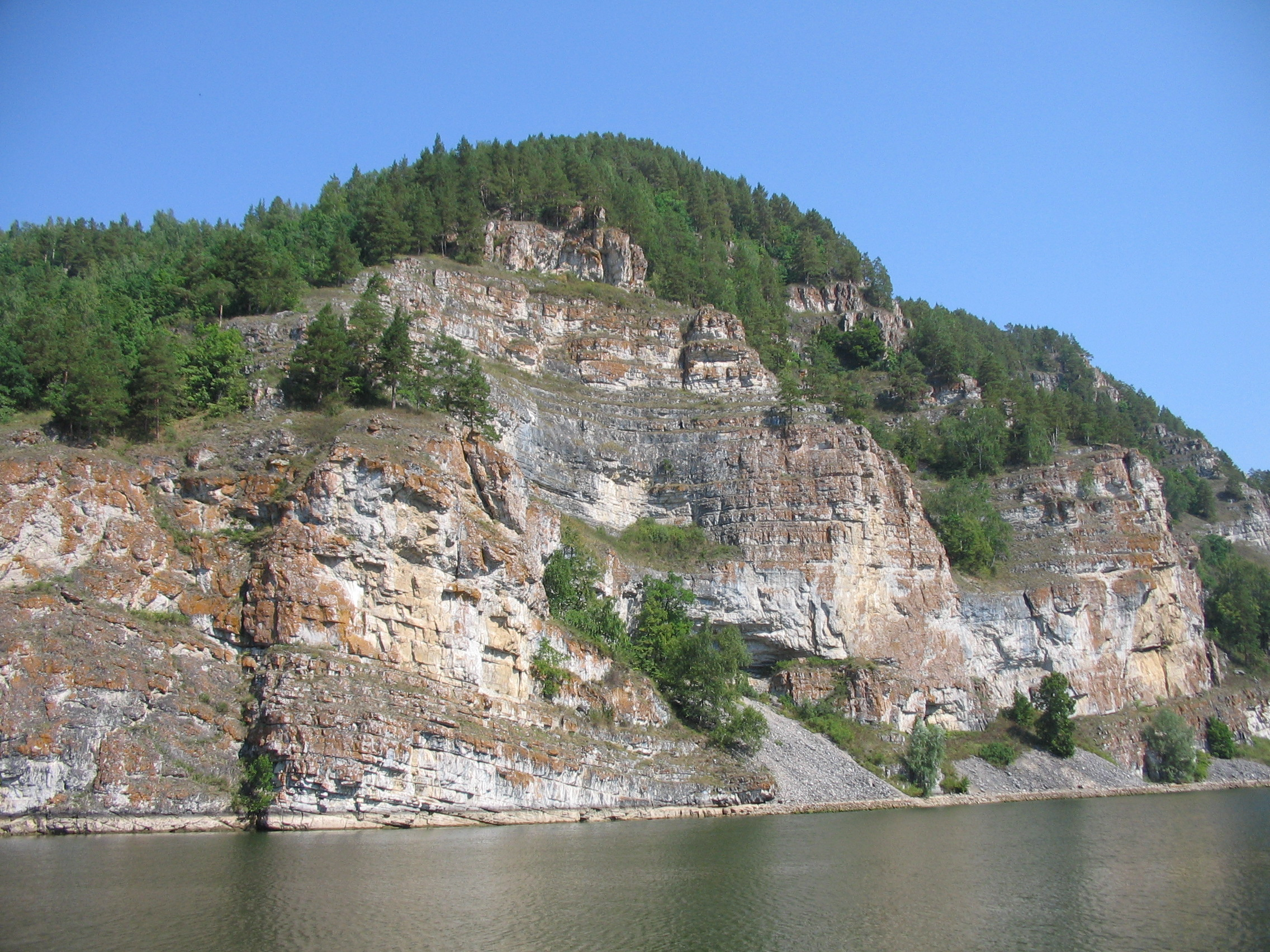

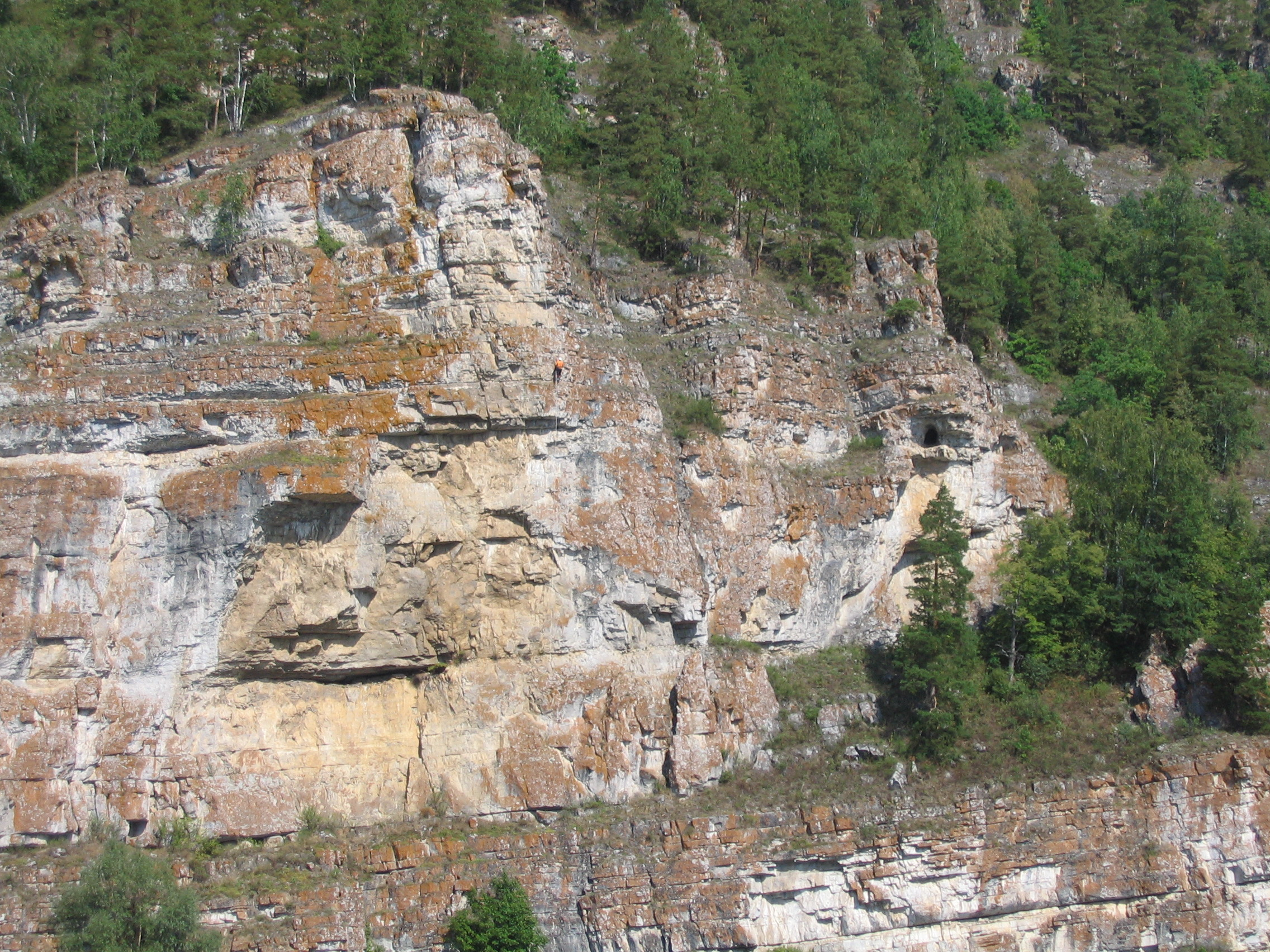
