= Dead Hand =

Cold War-era nuclear weapons control system

- Place of origin: Soviet Union

Service history
- In service: January 1985–present
- Used by: Russian Strategic Rocket Forces

Production history
- No. built: 1

Dead Hand, also known as Perimeter (Russian: Система «Периметр», romanized: Sistema "Perimetr", lit. '"Perimeter" System', with the GRAU Index 15E601, Cyrillic: 15Э601), is a Russian Federation nuclear weapons control system that is for fail-deadly and mutual assured destruction deterrence. It can initiate the launch of the Russian intercontinental ballistic missiles (ICBMs) by sending a pre-entered highest-authority order from the General Staff of the Armed Forces, Strategic Missile Force Management to command posts and individual silos if a nuclear strike is detected by seismic, light, radioactivity, and pressure sensors even with the commanding elements fully destroyed.

It was developed during the Cold War (similar in concept to the American AN/DRC-8 Emergency Rocket Communications System) that was constructed by the Soviet Union. The system remains in use in the post-Soviet Russian Federation.

By most accounts, it is normally switched off and is supposed to be activated during times of crisis; however, as of 2009, it was said to remain fully functional and able to serve its purpose when needed. Accounts differ on whether the system, once activated by the country's leadership, will launch missiles fully automatically or if there is still a human approval process involved, with newer sources suggesting the latter. In 2025, former Russian president Dmitry Medvedev publicly referenced the "Dead Hand" system.

== System concept ==
"Perimeter" appeared as an alternative system for all units armed with nuclear weapons. It was meant to be a backup communication system, in case the key components of the "Kazbek" command system and the link to the Strategic Missile Forces are destroyed by a decapitation first strike.

To ensure its functionality the system was designed to be mostly automatic, with the ability to decide an adequate retaliatory strike on its own with no (or minimal) human involvement in the event of an all-out attack.

According to Vladimir Yarynich, a developer of the system, this system also served as a buffer against hasty decisions based on unverified information by the country's leadership. Upon receiving warnings about a nuclear attack, the leader could activate the system, and then wait for further developments, assured by the fact that even the destruction of all key personnel with the authority to command the response to the attack could still not prevent a retaliatory strike. Thus, use of the system would theoretically reduce the likelihood of a false-alarm-triggered retaliation.

== Motivation ==
The purpose of the Dead Hand system was to maintain a second-strike capability, by ensuring that the destruction of the Soviet leadership would not have prevented the Soviet military from releasing its weapons.

Soviet concern about the issue grew with the U.S. development of highly accurate submarine-launched ballistic missile (SLBM) systems in the 1980s. Until then, the United States would have delivered most nuclear weapons by long-range bomber or ICBM. Earlier U.S. sub-launched missiles, such as the 1960s-vintage UGM-27 Polaris and 1970s-vintage UGM-73 Poseidon, were considered too inaccurate for a counterforce or first-strike attack, an attack against an opponent's weapons. SLBMs were reserved for attacking cities, where accuracy was of less importance. In the first case, an opponent with effective radar and satellite surveillance could expect a 30-minute warning of an attack before the first detonation. This made an effective first strike difficult, because the opponent would have time to launch on warning to reduce the risk of their forces being destroyed on the ground. The development of highly accurate SLBMs, such as the Trident C4 and, later, the D5, upset this balance. The Trident D5 is considered as accurate as any land-based ICBM. Therefore, US or UK Trident submarine systems could stealthily approach an enemy's coast and launch highly accurate warheads at close range, reducing the available warning to less than three minutes, making a counterforce first strike or a decapitation strike viable.

The Soviet Union took steps to ensure that nuclear retaliation, and hence deterrence, remained possible even if its leadership were to be destroyed in a surprise attack. In contrast, Thompson argues that Perimeter's function was to limit acts of misjudgment by political or military leadership in the tight decision-making window between SLBM/cruise missile launches and impact. He quotes Zheleznyakov on the purpose of Perimeter being "to cool down all these hotheads and extremists. No matter what was going to happen, there still would be revenge."

== Working principles ==
Upon activation and determination of the happening of a nuclear war, the system sends out a 15P011 command missile with a special 15B99 warhead that passes commands to open all silos and all command centers of the RVSN with appropriate receivers in flight. The command missile system is similar to the US Emergency Rocket Communications System.

== Components ==
=== Commanding rocket ===
This is the only well-known element of the entire system. In the complex sits a 15P011 rocket with the index 15A11 developed by KB "Yuzhnoe", based on the 15A16 (or MR UR-100U) rocket. With a commanding radio warhead designated 15B99 designed by the LPI Design Bureau, this ensures the transmission of launch orders from the central command post to all missile launch complexes under the impedance of nuclear explosions and active ECMs during the unpowered flight phase. Technical operation is completely identical to operating the 15A16 base rocket. The 15P716 launcher is a shaft-shaped automatic passive system of the "Missile launch facility" type, most likely an upgraded facility coded as OS-84, but does not rule out the possibility of basing the rocket in other types of silos. Development began in 1974 by the order of the Ministry of Defense. Flight tests were carried out on the NIIP-5 range (Baikonur) from 1979 to 1986. A total of seven launches (with six successful and one partially successful) were conducted and the system entered service in January 1985. The 15B99 warhead weighs 1412 kg.

=== Autonomous command and control system ===
This is the least publicly understood component of the entire system, with no reliable information on its existence. Speculation exists that the system is fully equipped with a variety of communication systems and sensors that monitor the military situation. This system is believed to be able to track the intensity of communications on military frequencies, receive telemetric signals from the command posts, measure the level of radiation on the surface and in the vicinity, which combined with the detection of short-term seismic disturbance, is inferred as a multiple-warhead nuclear strike. The system may possibly even be able to track people still alive in command posts. The correlation system, after analyzing these factors, may take the final step on launching the missiles.

Another hypothesis suggests that a dead man's switch is utilized. Upon receiving information about a missile launch, the supreme commander sets the system active, which, if not detecting a signal to stop the combat algorithm, automatically launches the commanding missile.

In an informal interview with Wired, Valery Yarynich, one of the developers, revealed the following information about the algorithm "Perimeter" works on:

It was designed to lie semi-dormant until switched on by a high official in a crisis. Then it would begin monitoring a network of seismic, radiation, and air pressure sensors for signs of nuclear explosions. Before launching any retaliatory strike, the system had to check off four if/then propositions: If it was turned on, then it would try to determine that a nuclear weapon had hit Soviet soil. If it seemed that one had, the system would check to see if any communication links to the war room of the Soviet General Staff remained. If they did, and if some amount of time—likely ranging from 15 minutes to an hour—passed without further indications of attack, the machine would assume officials were still living who could order the counterattack and shut down. But if the line to the General Staff went dead, then Perimeter would infer that apocalypse had arrived. It would immediately transfer launch authority to whoever was manning the system at that moment deep inside a protected bunker—bypassing layers and layers of normal command authority.

It has been claimed that the command post of the system is in a bunker under Kosvinsky Kamen mountain in the northern Urals.

== Operation ==
In 1967, the Soviet Union first attempted to create a system, called "Signal", which they could use to create 30 premade orders from their headquarters to the missile units. Although the system still was not completely automatic, their intent was no different.

In the early 1990s, several former high-ranking members of the Soviet military and the Central Committee of the Communist Party, in a series of interviews to the American defense contractor BDM, admitted the existence of the Dead Hand, making somewhat contradictory statements concerning its deployment.

Colonel General Varfolomey Korobushin, former Deputy Chief of Staff of Strategic Rocket Forces, in 1992 said that the Russians had a system, to be activated only during a crisis, that would automatically launch all missiles, triggered by a combination of light, radioactivity and overpressure, even if every nuclear-command center and all leadership were destroyed.

Colonel General Andrian Danilevich, Assistant for Doctrine and Strategy to the Chief of the General Staff from 1984 to 1990, stated in 1992 that the Dead Hand had been contemplated, but that the Soviets considered automatic-trigger systems too dangerous. Furthermore, such systems became unnecessary with the advent of efficient early-warning systems and increased missile readiness, so the idea had been rejected.

In 1993, Vitaly Katayev, Senior Advisor to the Chairman of the Defense Industry Department of the Central Committee of the Communist Party in 1967–1985, responsible for strategic arms and defense policy, arms control negotiations and military doctrine, confirmed that the Dead Hand had been "definitely operational" by the early 1980s. According to Katayev, it was not completely automatic but was intended to be activated manually during a threatening crisis. It was to be triggered by numerous sensors sensitive to light, seismic shock, radiation or atmospheric density.

Although both Katayev and Korobushin claimed that the mechanism had already been deployed, Viktor Surikov, Deputy Director of the Central Scientific Research Institute for General Machine Building (TsNIIMash) in 1976–1992, confirmed in 1993 that the Soviets had designed the automatic launch system with seismic, light and radiation sensors, but said that the design had been ultimately rejected by Marshal Sergey Akhromeyev on advice of Korobushin and never materialized.

Accounts differ as to the degree of automation of Dead Hand. A 1993 issue of The New York Times spoke to Bruce G. Blair, senior fellow with the Brookings Institution:

The dead-hand system he [Dr. Blair] describes today takes this defensive trend to its logical, if chilling, conclusion. The automated system in theory would allow Moscow to respond to a Western attack even if top military commanders had been killed and the capital incinerated.

The heart of the system is said to lie in deep underground bunkers south of Moscow and at backup locations. In a crisis, military officials would send a coded message to the bunkers, switching on the dead hand. If nearby ground-level sensors detected a nuclear attack on Moscow, and if a break was detected in communications links with top military commanders, the system would send low-frequency signals over underground antennas to special rockets.

Flying high over missile fields and other military sites, these rockets in turn would broadcast attack orders to missiles, bombers and, via radio relays, submarines at sea. Contrary to some Western beliefs, Dr. Blair says, many of Russia's nuclear-armed missiles in underground silos and on mobile launchers can be fired automatically.

However, more recent sources indicate the system was semi-automatic. In a 2007 article, Ron Rosenbaum quotes Blair as saying that Dead Hand is "designed to ensure semi-automatic retaliation to a decapitating strike". Rosenbaum writes, "Of course, there's a world of difference between a 'semi-automatic' doomsday device and the totally automatic—beyond human control—doomsday device."

Nuclear researcher Pavel Podvig also states that the system requires (and required) additional human input as last-ditch safety measure to launch missiles.

David E. Hoffman wrote on the semi-automatic nature of Dead Hand:

And they [the Soviets] thought that they could help those leaders by creating an alternative system so that the leader could just press a button that would say: I delegate this to somebody else. I don't know if there are missiles coming or not. Somebody else decide.

If that were the case, he [the Soviet leader] would flip on a system that would send a signal to a deep underground bunker in the shape of a globe where three duty officers sat. If there were real missiles and the Kremlin were hit and the Soviet leadership was wiped out, which is what they feared, those three guys in that deep underground bunker would have to decide whether to launch very small command rockets that would take off, fly across the vast territory of the Soviet Union and launch all their remaining missiles.

Now, the Soviets had once thought about creating a fully automatic system. Sort of a machine, a doomsday machine, that would launch without any human action at all. When they drew that blueprint up and looked at it, they thought, you know, this is absolutely crazy.

== Current use ==
In 2011, the commander of the Russian Strategic Missile Forces, Colonel General Sergey Karakayev, in an interview with Komsomolskaya Pravda, confirmed the operational state of the Perimeter assessment and communication system.

In 2018, Colonel General Viktor Yesin, the former chief of Russia's Main Staff of the Strategic Missile Forces, stated that the Perimeter system might become ineffective in the wake of the United States' withdrawal from the Intermediate-Range Nuclear Forces Treaty.

On 1 August 2025, U.S. president Donald Trump wrote on Truth Social that he had ordered the repositioning of two nuclear submarines, in response to a tweet by former Russian president Dmitry Medvedev that referenced the "Dead Hand" system.

== See also ==
- Doomsday device
- Dead man's switch
- Dr. Strangelove (film)
- AN/DRC-8 Emergency Rocket Communications System
- Letters of last resort
- Four-minute warning
- 1983 Soviet nuclear false alarm incident
- "Dead Man's Switch" (The Outer Limits)
- Herman Kahn
- Lethal autonomous weapon
- Mount Yamantaw
- Mutual assured destruction
- On Thermonuclear War (book)
- Operation Looking Glass
- Samson Option
- Space Cowboys (film)
- UVB-76, a Russian numbers station sometimes rumoured to be connected to the Dead Hand facility
- D3AD HAND (videogame)
