= 1991 Transcarpathian general regional referendum =

Transcarpathian general regional referendum, 1991

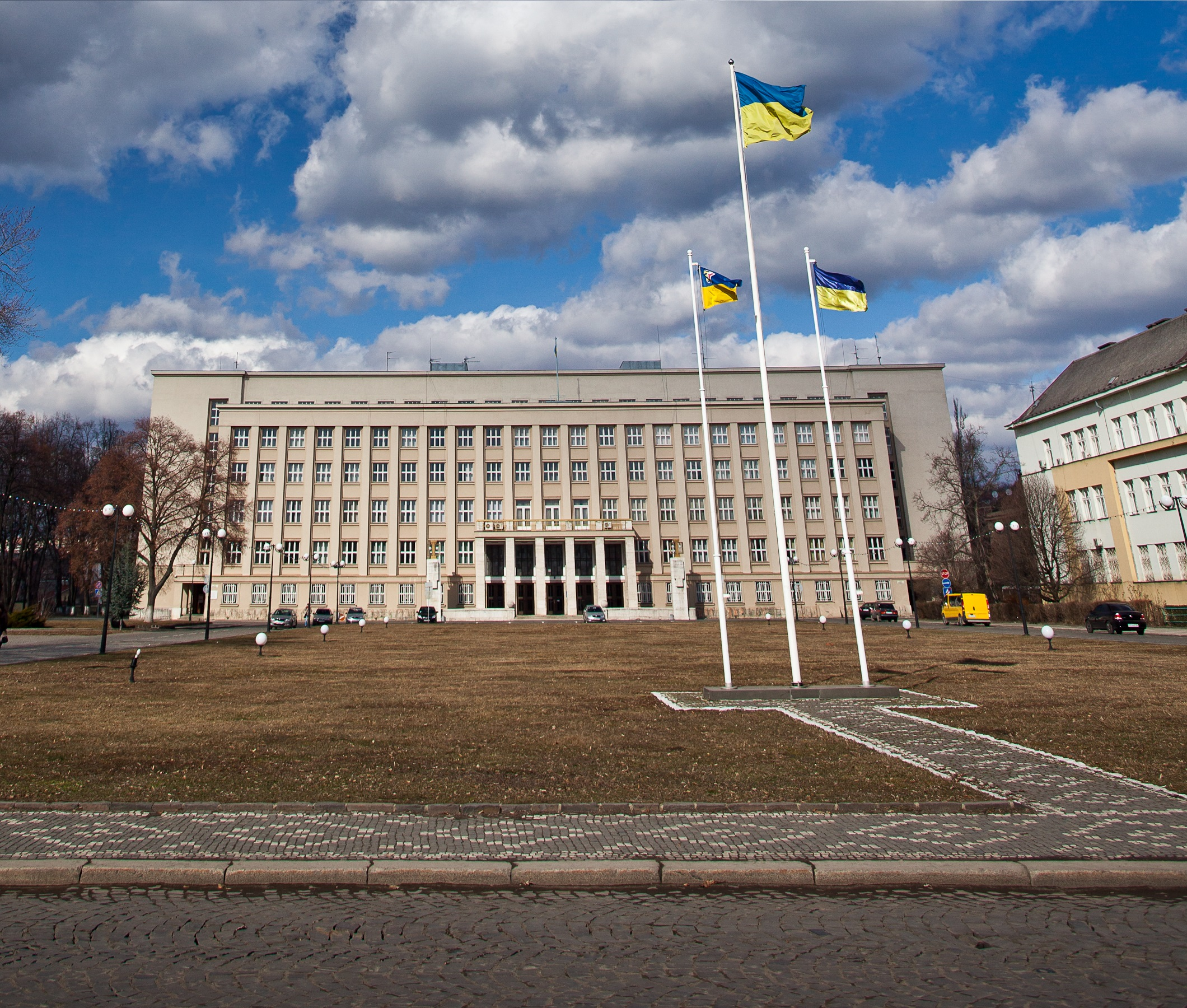

The 1991 Transcarpathian general regional referendum took place on December 1, 1991, on the same day as the Ukrainian independence referendum and the first presidential elections in Ukraine. The question of the referendum was "On the granting Transcarpathian region status of an autonomous province within Ukraine."

The vast majority of those who participated in the referendums voted for the "Independence of Ukraine" (90.13%) and the accession of Transcarpathia to Ukraine with the status of a "Special self-governing territory" (78%). There was a high turnout at the referendums, with 700,555 people recorded at the polls.

The region was historically known as Carpathian Ruthenia and had been given autonomous status within the Second Czechoslovak Republic during the interwar years, from 30 December 1938 to 15 March 1939. During World War II, the region declared independence as the short-lived independent Republic of Carpatho-Ukraine before being invaded by Hungarian forces and later being incorporated into the Soviet Union after the end of the war on January 30, 1946.

== Prelude ==
The legislation of the USSR on the procedure of secession of a Soviet Republic from the Union with regard to the legal sociological dispute, continuing around the results of the referendum of December 1, 1991, it was held at a time when factually and legally existed the state of USSR, and its legal framework remained in force. Therefore, strictly legally, decisions and actions within the existing at the time legal field can be regarded as legitimate.

This fact implies that the secession of any republic from the USSR had to be carried out only in accordance with the Law of the USSR of April 3, 1990 - "On the procedure of secession of a Soviet Republic from the Union of Soviet Socialist Republics." The article №3 of the Act states that: " In the Federal Republic, on the territory of which there are places of compact residence of national groups that make up the majority of the population of the area, when determining the outcome of the referendum, the results of voting in these localities are accounted for separately."

Part 7 of Article 14 of the Act also stipulates that in the event of secession of the republic from the USSR, there should be agreed status of the territories that do not belong to the seceding republic at the time of its accession to the Soviet Union. It is well known that the process of Ukraine's accession to the Soviet Union began on December 30, 1922, and finalized in May 1925, when the IX All-Ukrainian Congress of Soviets adopted a new text of the Constitution of the USSR, and on that date the Republic Subcarpathian Rus was part of the first Czechoslovak Republic. On 2 November 1938, as the result of the First Vienna Award parts of Czechoslovakia - Southern Slovakia and a part of Carpathian Ruthenia - were returned to Hungary, an area amounting to 11,927 km² and a population of 869,299 (86.5% of which were Hungarians according to the 1941 census). Between 5 November and 10 November, Hungarian armed forces peacefully occupied the newly transferred territories.

In March 1939, the Czecho-Slovak Republic was dissolved, Germany invaded it, and the Protectorate of Bohemia and Moravia was established. On 14 March, Slovakia declared itself to be an independent state. On 15 March, Carpatho-Ukraine declared itself to be an independent state. Hungary rejected the independence of Carpatho-Ukraine and, between 14 March and 18 March, Hungarian armed forces occupied the rest of Carpathian Ruthenia and ousted the government of Avgustyn Voloshyn. The Hungarians controlled the region until The Red Army ejected them in 1944. Subcarpathian Rus became part of the Soviet Union from the date of exchange of instruments of ratification of the Treaty from June 29, 1945 "On Transcarpathian Ukraine"4.

The interim, unelected National Assembly, appointed by decree of the President of the Czechoslovakia Eduard Benes, ratified the Treaty on November 22, 1945, and, accordingly, the Presidium of the Supreme Soviet of the USSR ratified it by its Decree on November 27, 1945.

Consequently, in accordance with Part 7 of Art. 14 of the Law of the USSR "On the procedure of secession ..." of April 3, 1990, Ukraine has been obliged to include in the ballot of the referendum of December 1, 1991, on the territory of Subcarpathian Rus, second question about the choice of the state affiliation of population of "the territory of the Rusyns to the south of the Carpathians"5.

(All this applies equally to the Western Ukraine (see Law of the USSR "On the inclusion of the Western Ukraine into the USSR ..." from November 1, 1939 (today Volyn, Drogobych, Lviv, Rivne, Ivano-Frankivsk and Ternopil region, and respectively Bukovina (Decree of the Presidium of the Supreme Soviet of the USSR of August 2, 1940)

== Organization of the referendum ==
M. Y. Voloshuk, chairman of the Transcarpathian Regional Council, initiated a regional referendum on granting the region the status of an autonomous republic within Ukraine 6.

On the first of October 1991 * (second column of the fourth paragraph) Regional Council adopts the Declaration "On the proclamation of Transcarpathia an autonomous province" 7.

Publication of the Declaration in the official organ of the Regional Council:

«Declaration granting Transcarpathia an autonomous status»

Based on tradition, identity, an inalienable right to the eternal desire of the multinational population of Transcarpathia to self-determination:

On the basis of the right to self-determination under the UN Charter and other international legal instruments, and guided by universal values and norms of equality of nations enshrined in the Declaration of Human Rights, the Helsinki Agreement, the Charter of Paris for a New Europe;

Implementing declarations on the state sovereignty of Ukraine and Act of Independence of Ukraine; Acknowledging Transcarpathia an integral part of independent Ukraine;

Based on the supremacy of the Constitution and laws of Ukraine; Seeking to ensure the right to national-cultural autonomy of all national groups in conjunction with the regional, national and local self-government;

Guaranteeing equal opportunities of participation in management of state and public affairs to representatives of all nationalities, regardless of their participation in political parties, movements, religious beliefs, type and nature of occupation, place and time of residence in the province under the Constitution and laws of Ukraine; Caring for the preservation and development of good-neighborly relations with all regions of Ukraine and other sovereign republics;

Rejecting any encroachment on the territorial integrity or attempts to change the borders at the expense or benefit of Transcarpathia, contraposition it to other regions of Ukraine; In an effort to increase and make better use of the unique natural and economic potential for the benefit of the people, to stop the irreversible changes in the spiritual development, the environment and demographic sphere, the regional Council of People's Deputies declares Transcarpathia an autonomous region as part of an independent democratic state - Ukraine.

This Declaration shall enter into force after its approval by the population of Transcarpathia at a regional referendum.

The Declaration is put for discussion at the session on a proposal from the City of Mukachevo, Mukachevo district, Beregovo district Soviets.

«Novyny Zakarpattya»", the newspaper of Regional Council of People's Deputies, №. 188, Tuesday, October 1, 1991

«The decision of the seventh session of the 21 convocation on the status of Transcarpathia as part of independent Ukraine»

For an objective consideration of the status of Transcarpathia as part of independent Ukraine, the seventh session of the 21 convocation of the Transcarpathian Regional Council decided to set up an appropriate commission.

DECISION OF THE SEVENTH SESSION OF THE XXI CONVOCATION

On the status of Transcarpathia as part of independent Ukraine Having considered the question of the status of Transcarpathia as part of an independent Ukraine, the regional Council of People's Deputies decided:

1. Noting the critical importance of the issue and the need for its comprehensive study, to set up a commission (the list of the committee members is attached).

2. The Commission is to publish a justification of the status of Transcarpathia in the press, and after analyzing the results of its pan-regional discussions, to submit their proposals on the matter to the regional executive committee until December 30, 1991.

3. To put forward the question on the status of Transcarpathia at a regional referendum in accordance with the Law "On All-Ukrainian and local referendums."

Presidium of the session

I. E. Gritsak.

V. V. Shepa.

«Novyny Zakarpattya», the newspaper of Regional Council of People's Deputies, №. 188 Tuesday, October 8, 1991

The commission included distinguished representatives of various public organizations, institutions, denominations, communities, trade unions and nationalities.

It represented various political forces in the region, such as, for example, the "Movement", "Democratic Party of Ukraine", "Ukrainian Republican Party".

Representatives of national public organizations of residents of Transcarpathia: "Roma", "Society of social and economic development of the Romanians in Transcarpathia named after Cosbuk", "Society of Germans "Revival ", "Society of Hungarian culture KMKS", "Society of Carpathian Rusyns", "Society of Slovaks."

Commissioners from religious organizations: "Mukachevo-Uzhgorod Orthodox diocese," "Pentecostal church", "a Roman Catholic religious community", "Mukachevo Greek Catholic diocese," "Reformed Church".

Public organizations of cultural and national orientation represented "Afghan war veterans", Society "Memorial", "Transcarpathian branch of the Writers' Union of Ukraine", regional organization of the "Society of the Ukrainian language named after Taras Shevchenko Prosvita".

ORGANISATIONAL STRUCTURE OF THE COMMISSION ON THE STUDY OF THE ISSUE «ON THE STATUS OF TRANSCARPATHIA AS PART OF INDEPENDENT UKRAINE»

1 ADAM Yosip Ivanovic, co-chair of the Roma community "Roma".

2 ADAM Aladar Evgenievich, co-chair of the Roma community "Roma"

3 BED Victor, MP, Chairman of the Transcarpathian regional organization "The People's Movement of Ukraine".

4 GABOR Ivan Ivanovich, the deputy of the Regional Council, the representative of Tyachiv region.

5 GEREVICH Ivan Ivanovich, the deputy of the Regional Council, the representative of Beregovo district.

6 HOLYSH Ivan Vasilyevich, representative of Mukachevo.

7 HORVAT Vasily Vasilievich, deputy of the Regional Council, the representative of Mukachevo district.

8 GRANCHAK Ivan Mikhailovich, Professor, Doctor of Historical Sciences.

9 GRECHANINOV Viktor Fedorovich, deputy of the Regional Council, the representative of Afghan war veterans.

10 GUZOV Mikhail Mikhailovich, deputy of the Regional Council, the representative of Rakhiv district.

11 GULACSY Ludwik Lyudvigovich, representative of the Reformed Church.

12 DUMNICH Mihail Vasilevich, representative of the Regional Council of Independent Trade Unions.

13. ZADIRAKA Valentina Dmitrievna, representative of the Velykyi Bereznyi district.

14. ZILGALOV Vasiliy Alekseevich, chairman of the regional organization "Memorial".

15. ILYASH Ivan Ivanovich, the deputy of the Regional Council, the representative of Vynohradiv district.

16. KAINZ Emelyan Ivanovich, chairman of the Society of Germans "Revival."

17. KEMENYASH Georgy Georgiyovich, the deputy of the regional council, representative of Svalyava district.

18. LELEKACH Ivan Mihaylovich, representative of Mukachevo Greek-Catholic diocese.

19. MADYAR Ivan Mikhailovich, deputy of the Regional Council, the representative of the district Irshava.

20. MATICO Ivan, a representative of society of Slovaks.

21. MARINA Vasily Vasilievich, deputy of the Regional Council, the representative of society of social and economic development of the Romanians in Transcarpathia named after Cosbuc.

22. MISHANICH Fedor Vasilievich, chairman of the regional organization of the Democratic Party of Ukraine.

23. MILOVAN Sandor, representative of the Roman Catholic religious community.

24. MOKRYANIN Ivan Mikhailovich, deputy of the regional Council, representative of the district Mizhgirya.

25. POP Vasily Stepanovich, Chairman of the Transcarpathian branch of the Writers' Union of Ukraine.

26. RIASHKO Mikhail Mikhailovich, representative of the Volovets district.

27. TIVODAR Michail Petrovic, deputy of the Regional Council, Ph.D..

28. TURJANYTSA Ivan Mikhailovich, professor, representative of the Society of Carpathian Rusyns.

29. USTICH Sergei Ivanovich, Vice Chairman of the Regional Executive Committee.

30. FEDAKA Pavel Mikhailovich, chairman of the regional organization of society "Prosvita".

31. FEER Petr Ivanovich, the deputy of the Regional Council, the representative of the Khust district.

32. FODOV Sandor Loyshovich, the deputy of the Regional Council, Chairman of the Society of Hungarian culture.

33. HRIPTA Ivan Andreevich, representative of the Pentecostal Church.

34. TSURKO Ivan Emerihovich, deputy of the regional Council, a representative of Uzhgorod district.

35. CHUCHKA Pavel Pavlovich - chairman of the Society of Ukrainian language "Prosvita", named afterTaras Shevchenko.

36. SHEREGIY Vasily Miroslavovich, a representative of the regional board of Ukrainian Republican Party.

37. SCHERBA Yemelyan Stanislavovich, member of the Regional Council, the representative of Perechyn district.

38. YAREMA Vasily Yurievich, representative of Mukachevo-Uzhgorod Orthodox diocese.

«Novyny Zakarpattya», the newspaper of Regional Council of People's Deputies, №. 193 Tuesday, October 8, 1991

=== Date announcement ===
In accordance with the requirement of Article 21 of the Ukrainian law, as amended in 1991, "On national and local referendums", the local Council of People's Deputies after receiving a properly drawn up proposal (on the status of Transcarpathia), had to make one of three decisions:

1. On the announcement of referendum

2. On the rejection of the referendum

3. On solving the issue at the session, as not requiring a referendum

The session decided to call a referendum, determine the date and content of the question put forward at the referendum. Announcement to call a referendum, its subject and date was published in the local media.

The decision of the seventh session of the Transcarpathian Regional Council
of People's Deputies of the twenty-first convocation on October 31, 1991
On holding of the regional referendum.

In accordance with Articles 125, 131 of the Constitution of the Ukrainian SSR, Articles 13, 14, 21, 22 of the Law of the USSR "On national and local referendums", Regional Council of People's Deputies decided:

1. To announce that regional referendum on the status of Transcarpathia as part of an independent Ukraine would be held on Sunday, December 1, 1991.

2. To assign the responsibilities of the regional, city (towns of regional subordination), district and precinct election committees on holding the regional referendum, accordingly to the existing regional, city (towns of regional subordination) and district electoral commissions on elections of deputies of local councils of people's deputies, the district commissions on elections of President of Ukraine and a nationwide referendum. Based on the fact that the regional referendum would be held simultaneously with the presidential elections in Ukraine and the nationwide referendum, and share the precinct commissions, to consider inappropriate to involve in conducting regional referendum electoral commissions of villages (towns of regional subordination), and village commissions on elections of deputies of the respective Soviets of People's Deputies .

3. To approve the content and form of the voting ballot for the regional referendum of December 1, 1991.

4. To instruct the Regional Commission for the Referendum and the Regional Executive Committee develop and implement the necessary organizational and technical measures for the regional referendum of December 1, 1991.

5. To publish in the media the decision to call a regional referendum on the status of Transcarpathia as part of independent Ukraine.

Presidium of the session:

I.E. Gritsak,

V.V. Shepa.

"Novyny Zakarpattya", Newspaper of Regional Council of People's Deputies, №. 212, Tuesday, November 5, 1991

Ballot text adopted at the seventh session of the Transcarpathian Regional Council from October 31, 1991:

The seventh session of the Transcarpathian Regional Council adopted and approved the text and the size of the Ballot in accordance with the requirements of the legislation

Ballot
For a vote in the general regional referendum

Do you wish that Transcarpathia obtained the status of an autonomous territory as a subject within independent Ukraine and not part of any other administrative and territorial formations?

Yes___________________________No

Leave one of the answers, cross out the other.

The Ballot, in which both of the words, "Yes" and "No" or neither of the words are crossed out during the vote, is nullified.

The size of the Ballot is 144,5x105 mm.

"Novyny Zakarpattya", the newspaper of the Regional Council of People's Deputies, №. 212, Tuesday, November 5, 1991

=== Publication of the "Declaration of Rights of Nationalities of Ukraine" ===
On the eve of the referendum (November 6, 1991), in the official organ of the Transcarpathian Regional Council of People's Deputies was published "Declaration of Rights of Nationalities of Ukraine" adopted by the "Verkhovna Rada of Ukraine" on November 1, 1991.

The purpose of the publication:

To convince inhabitants of the region that the "Ukrainian State guarantees all peoples, national groups and citizens living on its territory equal political, economic, social and cultural rights ... Ukrainian State guarantees its citizens ... in the regions densely populated by several ethnic groups that along with the state Ukrainian language may function language acceptable to the entire population of the area."

D E C L A R A T I O N
of the rights of Nationalities in Ukraine
(Published in Kiev Bulletin of the Verkhovna Rada (BVR) of Ukraine on 31.12.1991 - 1991 p., № 53, Article 799, Document 1771-12, the current edition - Adopted on 01/11/1991)

Parliament (Verkhovna Rada) of Ukraine on the basis of the Declaration of State Sovereignty of Ukraine, the Declaration of Independence of Ukraine, guided by the Universal Declaration of Human Rights and the international covenants on human rights and freedoms, ratified by Ukraine

Aspiring to the sacred principles of freedom, humanism, social justice, equality of all ethnic groups of the Ukrainian people in an independent, democratic Ukraine,

Taking into account that in the territory of Ukraine live more than 100 nationalities, who together with Ukrainians comprise fifty-two million people of Ukraine, adopts the following Declaration of the Rights of Nationalities in Ukraine:

Article 1

Ukrainian State guarantees all peoples, national groups and citizens living on its territory equal political, economic, social and cultural rights. Representatives of the peoples and national groups are elected on an equal basis to public authorities at all levels, occupy any position in government, enterprises, institutions and organizations. Discrimination based on nationality is prohibited and punishable by law.

Article 2

Ukrainian State guarantees all nationalities the right to maintain their traditional settlement and ensures the existence of the national administrative units, assumes the responsibility to create appropriate conditions for the development of national languages and cultures.

Article 3

Ukrainian State guarantees all peoples and ethnic groups the right to freely use their native language in all spheres of public life, including education, manufacturing, receiving and disseminating information. Verkhovna Rada of Ukraine interprets Article 3 of the Law "On Languages in the Ukrainian SSR" so that within the administrative-territorial units, densely populated by a specific nationality, can function its language on a par with the state language.

Ukrainian state provides to its citizens the right to free use of the Russian language. In areas densely populated by several ethnic groups, along with the state Ukrainian language can function language acceptable to the entire population of the area.

Article 4

All Ukrainian citizens of every nationality are guaranteed the right to practice their religion, to use their national symbols, to celebrate their national holidays, to participate in traditional rituals of their people.

Article 5

Monuments of history and culture of the peoples and national groups on the territory of Ukraine are protected by law.

Article 6

Ukrainian State guarantees all nationalities the right to create their own cultural centers, societies, communities, associations. These organizations can carry out activities aimed at the development of national culture, to hold public events in the manner prescribed by law, to promote the establishment of national newspapers, magazines, publishing houses, museums, art groups, theaters, film studios.

Article 7

National cultural centers and societies, representatives of national minorities have the right to free contacts with their historical homeland.

Parliament (Verkhovna Rada) of Ukraine

Kyiv, November 1, 1991 N + 1771-XII

"Novyny Zakarpattya", the newspaper of the Regional Council of People's Deputies, №. 213, Wednesday, November 6, 1991

=== Leonid Kravchuk and Transcarpathian regional referendum ===
On November 20, 1991, Chairman of the Supreme Soviet of the USSR, Ukrainian presidential candidate Leonid Kravchuk arrived in Transcarpathia. On the Eighth Extraordinary Session of the Regional Council gathered on this occasion, Leonid Kravchuk made a speech.

In his speech, he emphasized the delicacy of the referendum issue and urged the assembled deputies to amend the text of the ballot. First of all, it was offered to replace the term "autonomy" with "self-governing territory."

(...)

Given the situation, Transcarpathian region could be granted a special status of self-governing territory. This area independently solves their cultural, language problems, the nature of the election of authorities, economic affairs. Of course, in accordance with the laws of Ukraine.

(...)

If you replace the word "autonomy" in the Ballot with "special self-governing territory", in this case, I will support you. Otherwise, he said, there will be all sorts of problems, including legal.

(...)

So, it seems to me, stressed Leonid Makarovych, if this region is given such a special status, by this act is absorbed a number of problems - economic, national linguistic, cultural, political, and others. And, most importantly, it is to be compatible with the Constitution, our laws ...

It will not be someone's wish. This status will be valid, have a legislative power, it will be part of the Constitution .. This means that the future of this region will not depend on the good or bad presidents, on good or bad prime ministers. This would open the path to full self-realization. What is the difference between autonomy and special status of self-governing territory?

When talking about autonomy, said the Chairman of the Parliament (Verkhovna Rada), it is necessary to define what is this autonomy: the national and cultural, or regional, or republican, or possibly some other autonomy. There is autonomy in general, it has some specific form. And this specific form in the regional ballot has not been determined. If we are talking about the autonomy of the state, then the formation of further 10-12, or possibly 20 state and political structures in Ukraine (as, say, autonomies in Russia at the moment) could initiate interstate, inter-autonomous problems.

That is particularly worrisome.

And the status of a self-governing territory gives it the full right to dispose of its wealth, its resources, its economic, cultural and national issues.

The main thing is that it is not a state, but a self-governing structure. And the state is only one - the state of Ukraine.

"Novyny Zakarpattya", the newspaper of the Regional Council of People's Deputies, №. 223, Thursday, November 21, 1991

The decision of the extraordinary eighth session of the Regional Council of the XX convocation (November 20, 1991) "Amendments to the text of the ballot for voting at the regional referendum on December 1, 1991"

The decision of the extraordinary eighth session of the Regional Council of the XX convocation (November 20, 1991), "Amendments to the text of the ballot for voting at the regional referendum on December 1, 1991". After lengthy debate, it was decided to change the wording "status of an autonomous territory" in the text of the ballot to "enshrined the Constitution of Ukraine status of a special self-governing administrative territory." New ballot was approved by this same session.

DECISION
Of the extraordinary eighth session
of the Regional Council of the XX convocation
ON AMENDMENTS IN THE TEXT OF THE BALLOT FOR VOTING AT THE REGIONAL REFERENDUM on December 1, 1991
The referendum of December 1, 1991
Regional Council of People's Deputies adopted a decision:

On partial change (p.3) of the decision of the Regional Council of People's Deputies from October 31, 1991, "On holding of the regional referendum" to approve the following text of the ballot in the regional referendum of December 1, 1991 :

«Do you wish that Transcarpathia obtained enshrined in the Constitution of Ukraine status of a special self-governing administrative territory as a subject within the independent Ukraine and not part of any other administrative and territorial formations?».

Presidium of the session

Gritsak I.Y.

Shepa V.V.

"Novyny Zakarpattya", the newspaper of the Regional Council of People's Deputies, №. 223, Thursday, November 21, 1991

=== Appeal of the Executive Committee of the Regional Council of People's Deputies to the people of Transcarpathia ===
Article 125 of the Constitution of the Ukrainian SSR (1978) provided the possibility of participation of local councils of people's deputies in the discussion of issues of republican and national importance, and Article 131 enabled them to put the most important local issues to the vote in a referendum.

Using this competence, the executive committee of the Council of People's Deputies made a formal interpretation and explanation of the issue submitted to the referendum.

The basic rights guaranteed by referendum in case of an affirmative answer of the majority of polled citizens, residents of Transcarpathia, were:

- Independently form governments at all levels

- Independently solve issues of economical, socio-cultural and spiritual development of the region

- Actions of the President and the Parliament (Verkhovna Rada) at a self-governing territory, would have no direct legal effect, only the Constitution and laws of Ukraine would operate there.

"Appeal"
The Executive Committee of the Regional Council of People's Deputies
Dear Transcarpathians!

On Sunday, December 1, when receiving the ballots, you must make a fateful choice:

(...)

- Will Transcarpathia have the status of special self-governing administrative territory as a part of independent Ukraine?

(...)

We urge you to say, "Yes", I wish that Transcarpathia obtained enshrined in the Constitution of Ukraine status of a special self-governing administrative territory, as a subject within an independent Ukraine, and not part of any other administrative and territorial formations.

This status would guarantee us:

- Free trade zone;

- The right to independently, in the interest of the region and its population address the issues of economics, socio-cultural and spiritual development;

- The right to form our own governments at all levels;

- That there would be no direct actions of the President and the Verkhovna Rada at the self-governing territory, only the Constitution and laws of Ukraine would operate there;

- The possibility of full consideration of the interests of all nationalities living in the region, their broader representation in government, self-government, the right to have their national and cultural formations.

"Novyny Zakarpattya", the newspaper of the Regional Council of People's Deputies, №. 223, Thursday, November 21, 1991

== Results of the Regional referendum ==
Strictly following the provisions of Article 31 of the Law of the Ukrainian SSR "On national and local referendums" (as revised in 1991), the official organ of the Regional Council ("Novyny Zakarpattya") on December 3, 1991, published the primary results of the republican and Transcarpathian regional referendums.

The vast majority taking part in the referendum voted for the "Independence of Ukraine" (90.13%), and accession of Transcarpathia to Ukraine with the status of a "Special self-governing territory" (78%). The high turnout at the referendums (700 555 thousand).

The results of the referendum

For the independence of Ukraine	90,13%
For the President of Ukraine Leonid Kravchuk	60%
For the self-governing Transcarpathia	78%

ANNOUNCEMENT
of regional commission of the general regional referendum about vote returns on December 1, 1991

1. The number of citizens included in the voting lists	847364
2. The number of citizens who received ballots	702324
3. The number of citizens who participated in voting	700555
4. The number of people who answered "YES"	546450
5. The number of people who answered «NO»	128762
6. The number of ballots declared invalid	25 343

"Novyny Zakarpattya", the newspaper of the Regional Council of People's Deputies, №. 231, Tuesday, December 3, 1991

The next issue of the newspaper "Novyny Zakarpattia" (Wednesday 4 December 1991). On the basis of the received protocols, the regional commission reported detailed data of the results of the referendum.

Detailed data by districts - the number of people taking part in the vote, and the number of citizens who answered the offered questions - "YES".

From the Tables follows the conclusion about high commitment of citizens (the average in the region 82.7%), and high percentages of citizens who answered "YES" at the referendum (the average in the region 78%).

The lowland areas of the region: Uzhgorod - 89.7%, Berehove - 88.9%, Svalyava - 86.5% had a higher percentage of affirmative votes at the regional referendum than the highlands: Rakhiv - 54.1%, Mizhgirya - 59%.

SUMMARY
of the number of citizens who participated
in voting on December 1, 1991 (percentage)

Names of the city executive committees and district executive committees	Regional referendum
Mukachevo	75.2
Uzhgorod	76.7
Beregovo	87.3
Velyky Berezny	96,3
Vinogradov	78,1
Volovets	93.7
Irshava	90.8
Mezhgorye	89.0
Mukachevo	84.4
Perechyn	87.9
Rahov	79.5
Svalyava	92.1
Tyachevo	75.1
Uzhgorod	85,3
Khust	83.1
Total:	82.7

SUMMARY
of the number of citizens,
who answered «YES» during the vote
at the regional referendum (percentage)

Names of the city executive committees and district executive committees	Regional referendum
Mukachevo	84.7
Uzhgorod	82.7
Beregovo	88.9
Velyky Berezny	86.3
Vinogradov	83.2
Volovets	85.2
Irshava	80.1
Mezhgorye	59.4
Mukachevo	86.1
Perechyn	84.2
Rahov	54.1
Svalyava	86.5
Tyachevo	61.8
Uzhgorod	89.7
Khust	70.4
Total:	78.0

"Novyny Zakarpattya", the newspaper of the Regional Council of People's Deputies, №. 232, Wednesday, December 4, 1991

== The legitimacy of the referendum ==
The 1991 referendum was closely watched not only by the citizens of Ukraine, but also the international community.

Almost all foreign observers, including authoritative international and European representatives, noted the high level of organization and the absence of significant violations.

"Referendum in Ukraine was organized without any violations"

— Jon Gundersen, United States Ambassador to Ukraine 8

Michel Jakmain - Secretary of the Bureau of the National Assembly of France

Gert Weisskirchen - Member of the German Bundestag

Patrick Boyer - a member of the Canadian Parliament (and others)

According to the US Ambassador in Ukraine Jon Gundersen, Office Secretary of the National Assembly of France, Michel Jakmain, Bundestag deputy Gert Weisskirchen, a member of the Canadian Parliament Patrick Boyer and others who were at the meeting, the referendum in Ukraine was held in an orderly manner, without any violations. Its results will open up new opportunities for fruitful and mutually beneficial cooperation with foreign countries.

"Novyny Zakarpattya", the newspaper of the Regional Council of People's Deputies, №. 231, Tuesday, December 3, 1991

== Refusal of the Supreme Council of Ukraine ==
The first in the history of the USSR Crimean referendum of January 20, 1991 (on the reestablishment of the Crimean Autonomous Soviet Socialist Republic) served as a legal justification for the Transcarpathian regional referendum. Taking into account the will of the Crimean people, on February 12, 1991, the Supreme Council of the Ukrainian SSR adopted the Law "On the reestablishment of the Crimean Autonomous Soviet Socialist Republic within the Crimean region as part of the Ukrainian SSR"

It was the first implemented attempt to decide the fate of the people based on the will of the citizens themselves.

Representatives of the IX-th session of the Transcarpathian Regional Council of People's Deputies, as a legislative initiative, appealed to the Verkhovna Rada of Ukraine with a demand to make changes and additions to the Constitution of Ukraine according to the results of the Transcarpathian regional referendum.

The procedure required supplementing the first part of Article 77 of the Constitution with the words: "In Ukraine, there is a special self-governing administrative territory, Transcarpathia", as well as supplementing Article 752, "Special self-governing administrative territory, Transcarpathia, is a part of Ukraine ..." because referendum actually took place in the context of making Transcarpathia a part of Ukraine.

However, the supreme legislative body of Ukraine, using the procedure of bureaucratic sabotage, ignored the mandatory introduction of amendments and additions to the Constitution of the USSR (as it was done in the case of the Crimea), thereby putting the issue of adaptation of Ukrainian legislation to the legal status of the Transcarpathian region as part of an independent Ukraine, outside of the legal framework of Ukraine.

DECISION
of the ninth session of the Regional Council of People's Deputies from January 24, 1992
ON THE APPEAL TO THE VERKHOVNA RADA OF UKRAINE
"Regarding amendments and additions to the Constitution of Ukraine"

Given that 546,450 of the adult population of the region (78 percent) at the regional referendum on December 1, 1991, were in favor of granting Transcarpathia enshrined in the Constitution of Ukraine status of a special self-governing administrative territory as a part of independent Ukraine, and in accordance with the Article 38 of the Law of Ukraine "On Local Soviets of People's Deputies of the USSR and local self-government ", the regional Council of People's Deputies decided as part of legislative initiative to appeal to the Verkhovna Rada of Ukraine on introduction of amendments and additions to the Constitution of Ukraine:

1. To add the words: "In Ukraine, there is a special self-governing administrative territory, Transcarpathia" to the first part of Article 77 of the Constitution.

2. Supplement the Constitution of Ukraine with the chapter 72, "Special self-governing administrative territory, Transcarpathia" and the Article 752, "Special self-governing administrative territory, Transcarpathia, is a part of Ukraine and decides independently on matters within its competence."

Chairman of the Council

I. KRAILO

"Novyny Zakarpattya", the newspaper of the Regional Council of People's Deputies, №. 12/260, Thursday, January 30, 1992

== The Law of Ukraine "On the self-governing special administrative territory of Transcarpathia" ==
The Law of Ukraine "On the self-governing special administrative territory of Transcarpathia" - adopted the sixth of March 1992 at the second meeting of the IX- session of the Transcarpathian Regional Council of People's Deputies. Initiated by the Transcarpathian Regional Council, in order to introduce into the legal framework of Ukraine the results of Transcarpathian general regional referendum of December 1, 1991, on the status of Transcarpathia as a self-governing special administrative territory as a subject of an independent Ukraine, its non-accession into any other administrative-territorial units and securing (this status) in the Constitution of Ukraine.

The Law of Ukraine
Section I
GENERAL PROVISIONS

Article 1. The self-governing special administrative territory Transcarpathia

The special self-governing administrative territory Transcarpathia is a special subject of administrative and territorial structure of Ukraine.

Article 2 Constitutional and legal status of Transcarpathia

Status of Transcarpathia defines the Constitution of Ukraine, this Law, the Statute and other regulations of Transcarpathia.

Article 3. Principles of special administrative government

The status of self-governing special administrative territory of Transcarpathia is based on the following principles:

1. Inviolability and indivisibility of the territory of Transcarpathia as an integral part of Ukraine
2. Non-accession of Transcarpathia in any other state and administrative-territorial formations
3. Ensuring the rights and freedoms of the individual
4. Ensuring national territorial and cultural autonomy
5. Ensuring economic independence and the right to choose the forms of its realization, self-financing

Distribution of powers of national authorities and authorities of self-governing special administrative territory define this Law in the absence of direct effect of acts of the executive and administrative authorities of the State in the territory of Transcarpathia.

...

The Law of Ukraine: On the Self-governing Special Administrative Territory of Transcarpathia, 1992 (draft) – via Wikisource.

Public information about the work on the draft Law in the committees of the Supreme Council of Ukraine is absent.

Since, in accordance with the Law "On referenda ..." in the wording of 1991, results of the referendum shall come into force upon their publication in the official media organ to hold a referendum. Therefore, because of the refusal of the Supreme Council of Ukraine to adopt the law regulating the status of Transcarpathia as part of Ukraine (in accordance with the results of the referendum), thus far it remains uncertain.

== Analysis of the results of the referendum ==
Strictly in accordance with the Law "On referendums ..." in the wording of the 1991, results of the referendum shall come into force upon their publication in the official media of the authority that held a referendum. In April 2016 then governor of Zakarpattia Oblast Hennadiy Moskal claimed the referendum directly contradicted this (then) law.

This publication of the results of the referendum in our region was made on Dec. 4, 1991, in the newspaper of the Regional Council of People's Deputies, "Novyny Zakarpattya" and, therefore, the results of the referendum have acquired an imperative legal force of the Law of Ukraine. (The results of the referendum do not require any approval or confirmation.)

Ukrainian and Transcarpathian regional referendums have the same legal effect (are legally equivalent), and their legal implementation or lack of it will automatically lead to the identical consequences for the legal entity.

If the results of the referendum cause compatibility issues with existing legal realities for the current regime, it is necessary to amend the national legislation or it (the referendum) should be held again.
