= List of cities in Bashkortostan =

Cities in a republic of Russia

This is a complete list of cities in Bashkortostan. There are 21 cities (Note: Including 1 closed city, Mezhgorye) (Bashkir: ҡала, romanized: qala) in Bashkortostan. City status was usually granted in imperial times.

Smaller settlements are urban-type settlements (Bashkir: ҡала тибындағы ҡасаба, romanized: qala tibındağı qasaba) and villages (Bashkir: ауыл, romanized: awıl).

The list of cities is ordered by the 2021 Russian census and compared to the 2010 census. The cities of republic significance are shown in italic.

== List of cities ==
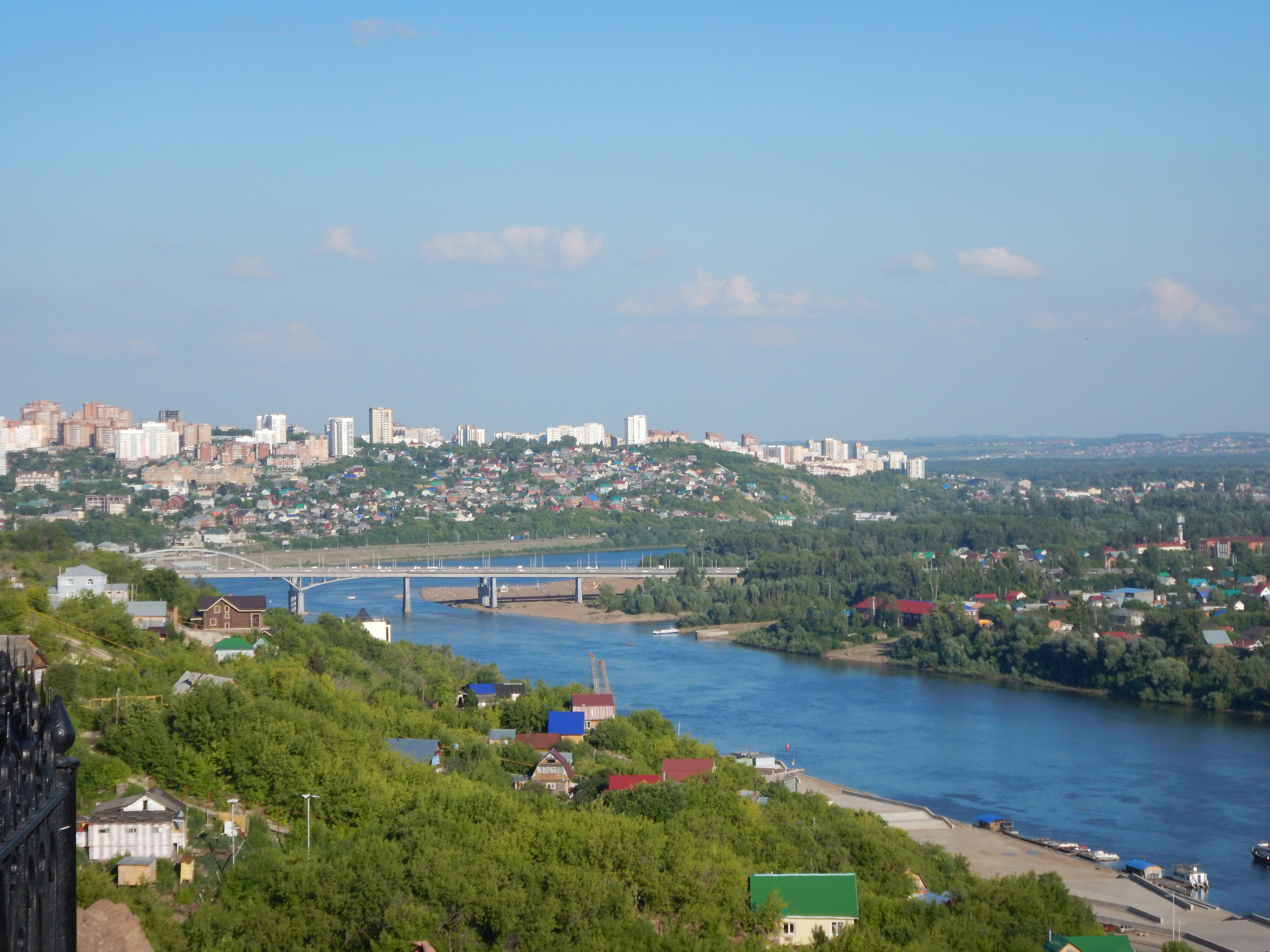
Ufa

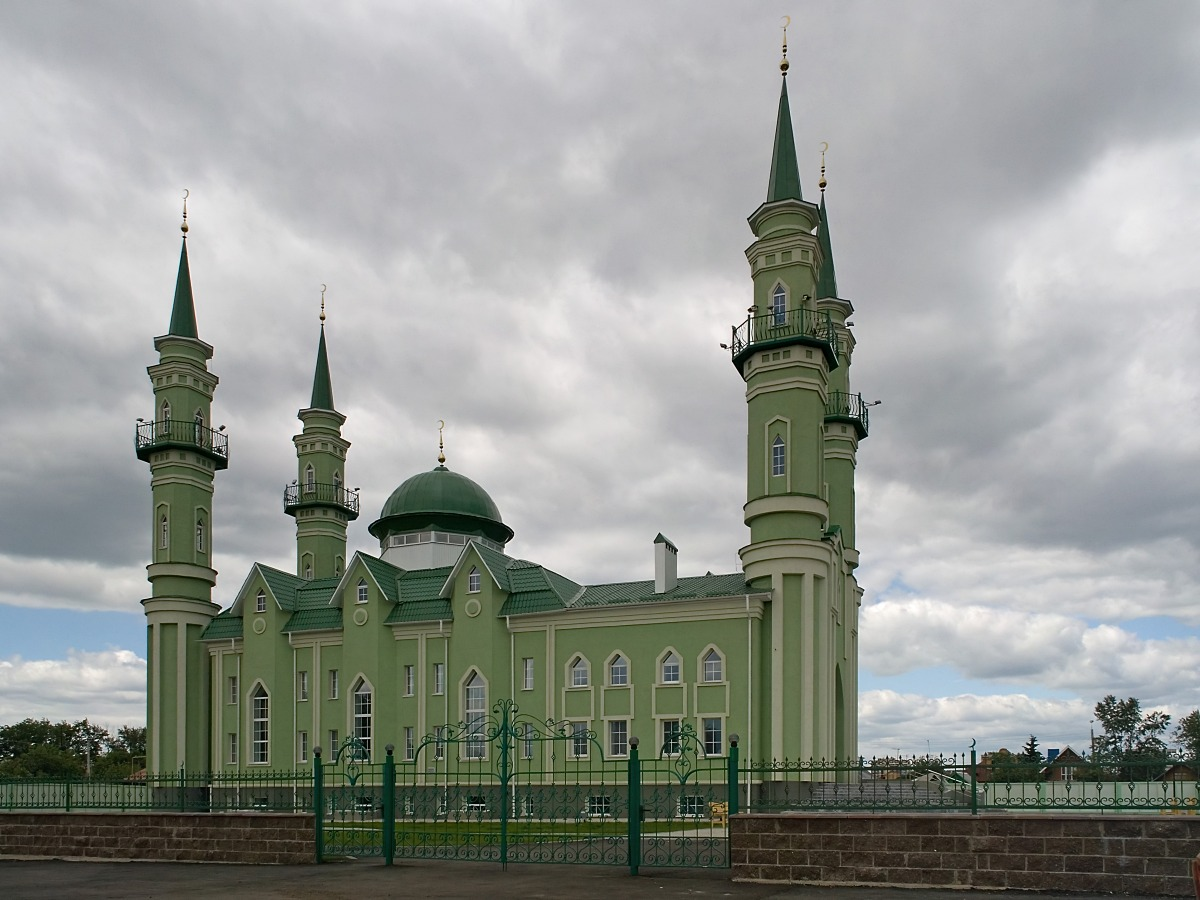
Sterlitamak

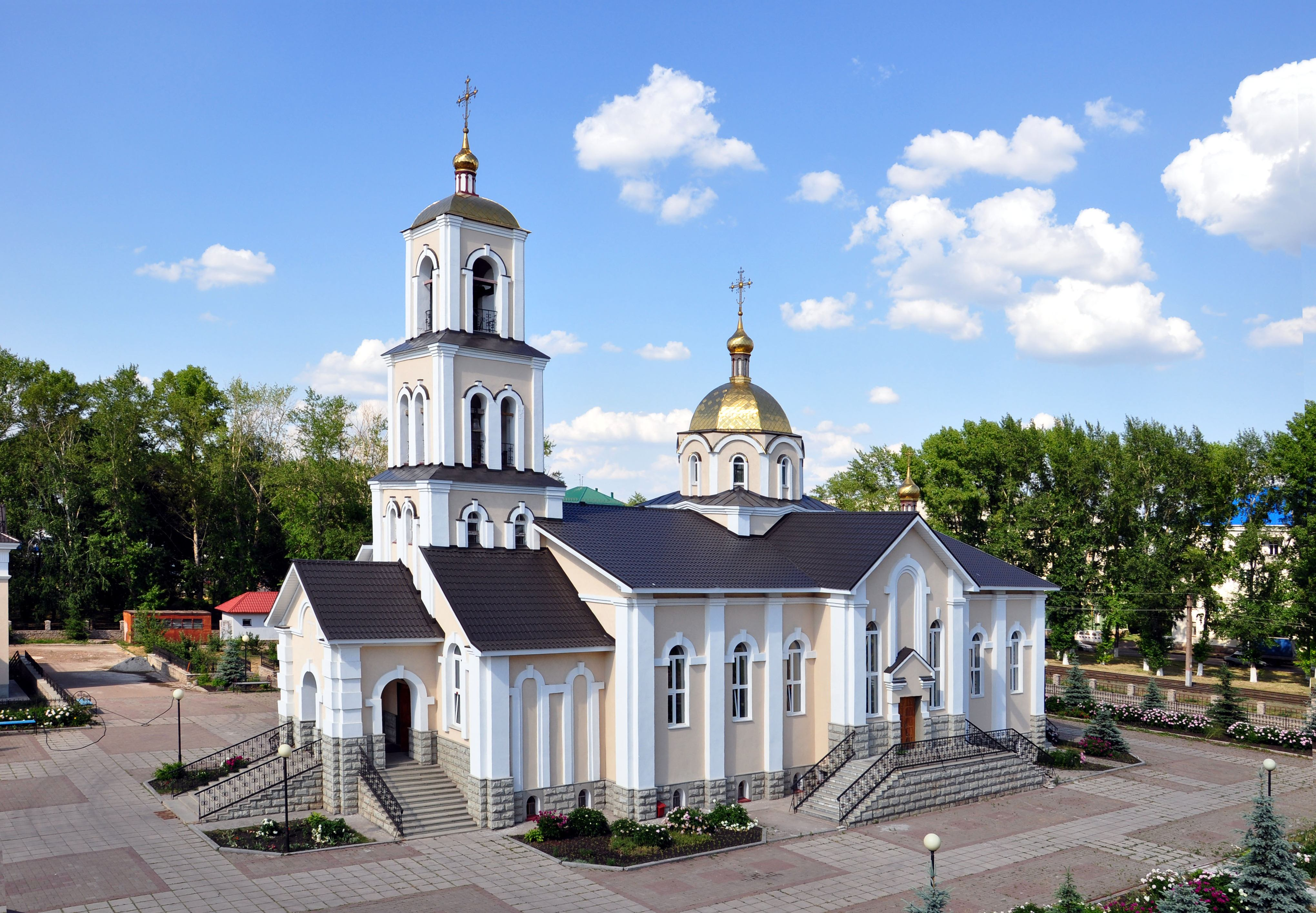
Salavat

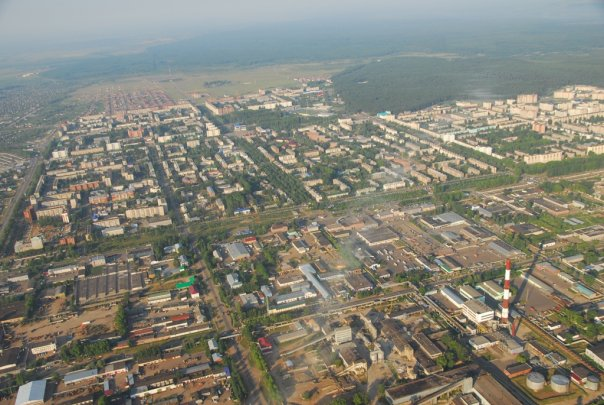
Neftekamsk

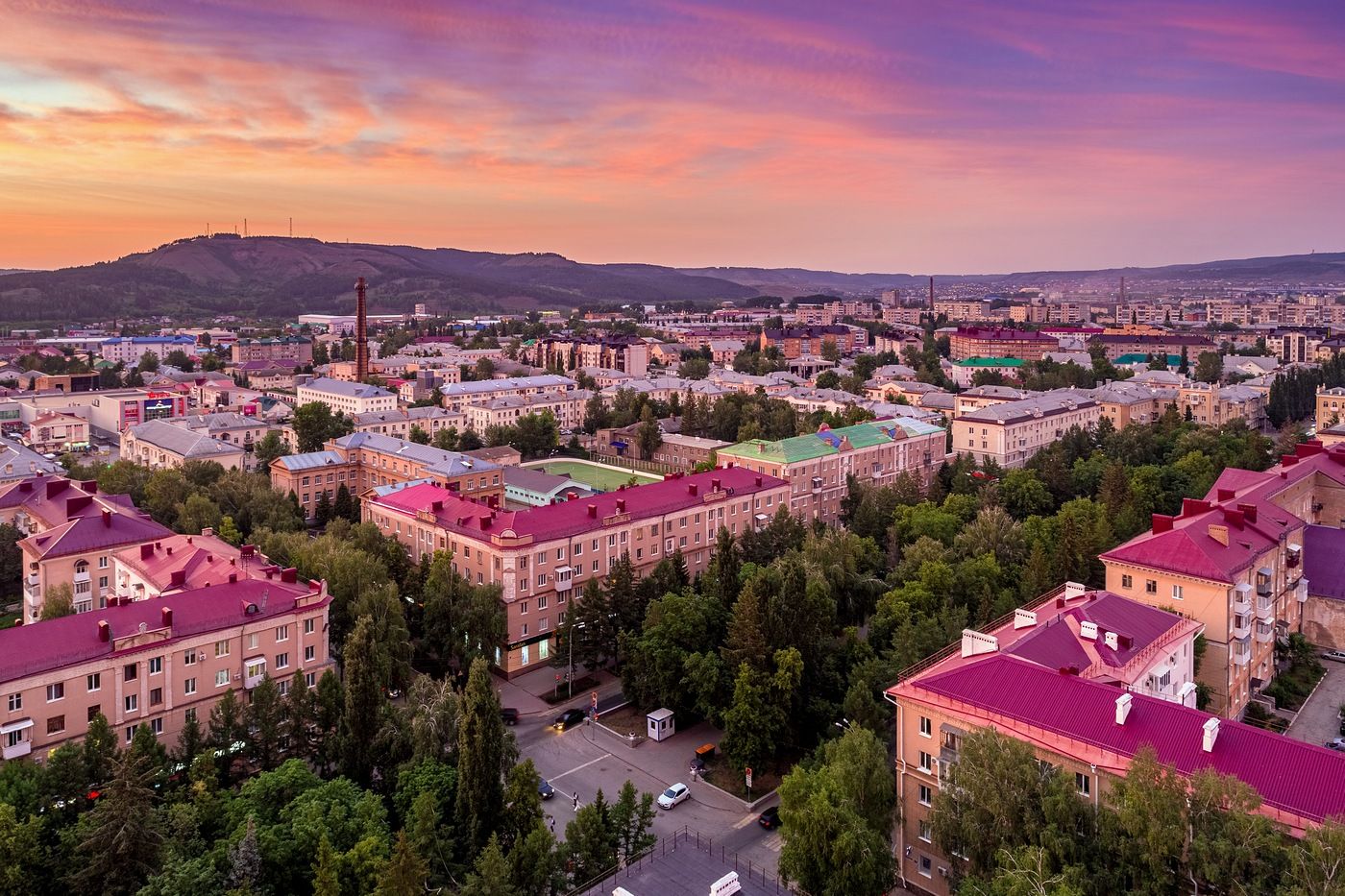
Oktyabrsky

City name	City name (in Bashkir with romanization)	City name (in Russian)	Population (2021 census)	Population (2010 census)	Population change
Ufa	Өфө; Öfö	Уфа	1,157,994	1,062,319	+9.01%
Sterlitamak	Стәрлетамаҡ; Stärletmaq	Стерлитамак	277,410	273,486	+1.43%
Salavat	Салауат; Salawat	Салават	148,575	156,095	−4.82%
Neftekamsk	Нефтекама; Heftekama	Нефтекамск	131,942	121,733	+8.39%
Oktyabrsky	Октябрьский; Oktyabrskiy	Октябрьский	115,557	109,474	+5.56%
Tuymazy	Туймазы; Tuymazı	Туймазы	68,349	66,836	+2.26%
Beloretsk	Белорет; Beloret	Белорецк	64,525	68,806	−6.22%
Ishimbay	Ишембай; İşembay	Ишимбай	64,041	66,259	−3.35%
Belebey	Бәләбәй; Bäläbäy	Белебей	59,195	60,700	−2.48%
Kumertau	Күмертау; Kümertaw	Кумертау	57,949	62,851	−7.80%
Sibay	Сибай; Sibay	Сибай	56,514	62,763	−9.96%
Meleuz	Мәләүез; Mäläüez	Мелеуз	56,505	61,390	−7.96%
Birsk	Бөрө; Börö	Бирск	44,295	41,635	+6.39%
Uchaly	Учалы; Uchalı	Учалы	36,175	37,788	−4.27%
Blagoveshchensk	Благовещен; Blagoveşçen	Благовещенск	35,481	34,239	+3.63%
Dyurtyuli	Дүртөйлө; Dürtöylö	Дюртюли	31,185	31,274	−0.28%
Yanaul	Яңауыл; Yañawıl	Янаул	25,908	26,924	−3.77%
Davlekanovo	Дәүләкән; Däüläkän	Давлеканово	21,834	24,073	−9.30%
Baymak	Баймаҡ; Baymaq	Баймак	17,833	17,710	+0.69%
Mezhgorye (Note: Closed city)	Межгорье; Mejgorye	Межгорье	15,697	17,352	−9.54%
Agidel	Ағиҙел; Ağiźel	Агидель	14,219	16,370	−13.14%

== See also ==
- Administrative divisions of Bashkortostan

=== Other countries ===
- List of cities in Ukraine
