= Mount Yamantau =

Mountain in Bashkortostan, Russia

Yamantau
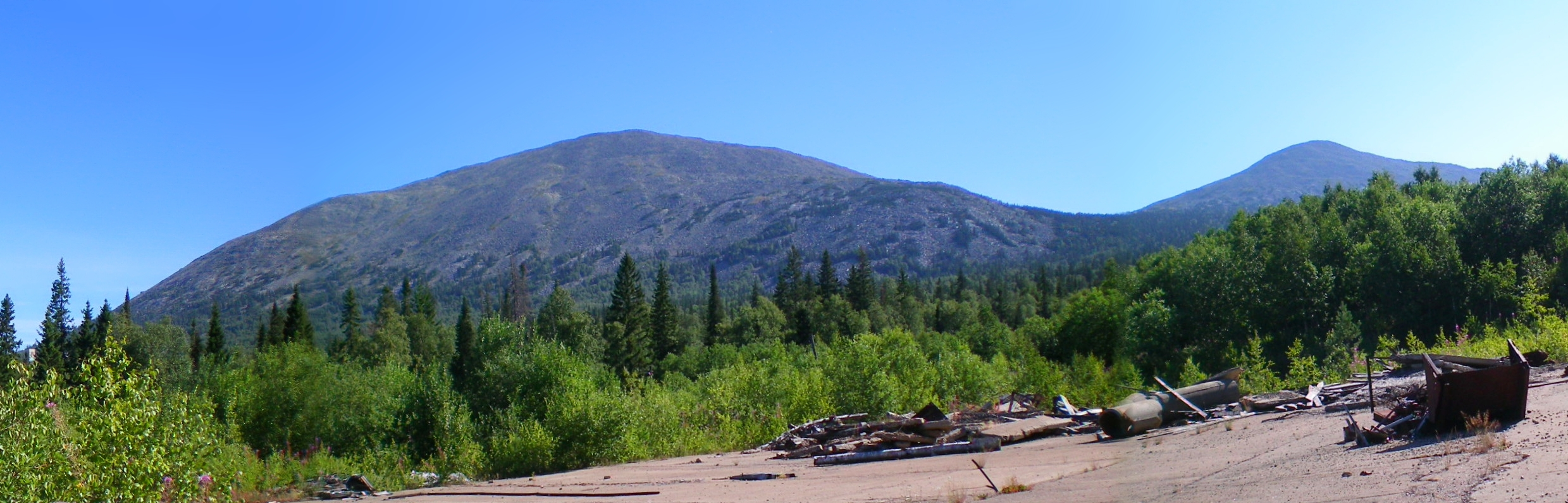

Highest point
- Elevation: 1,640 m (5,380 ft)
- Listing: Mountains of Russia
- Coordinates: 54°15′18″N 58°06′13″E

Geography
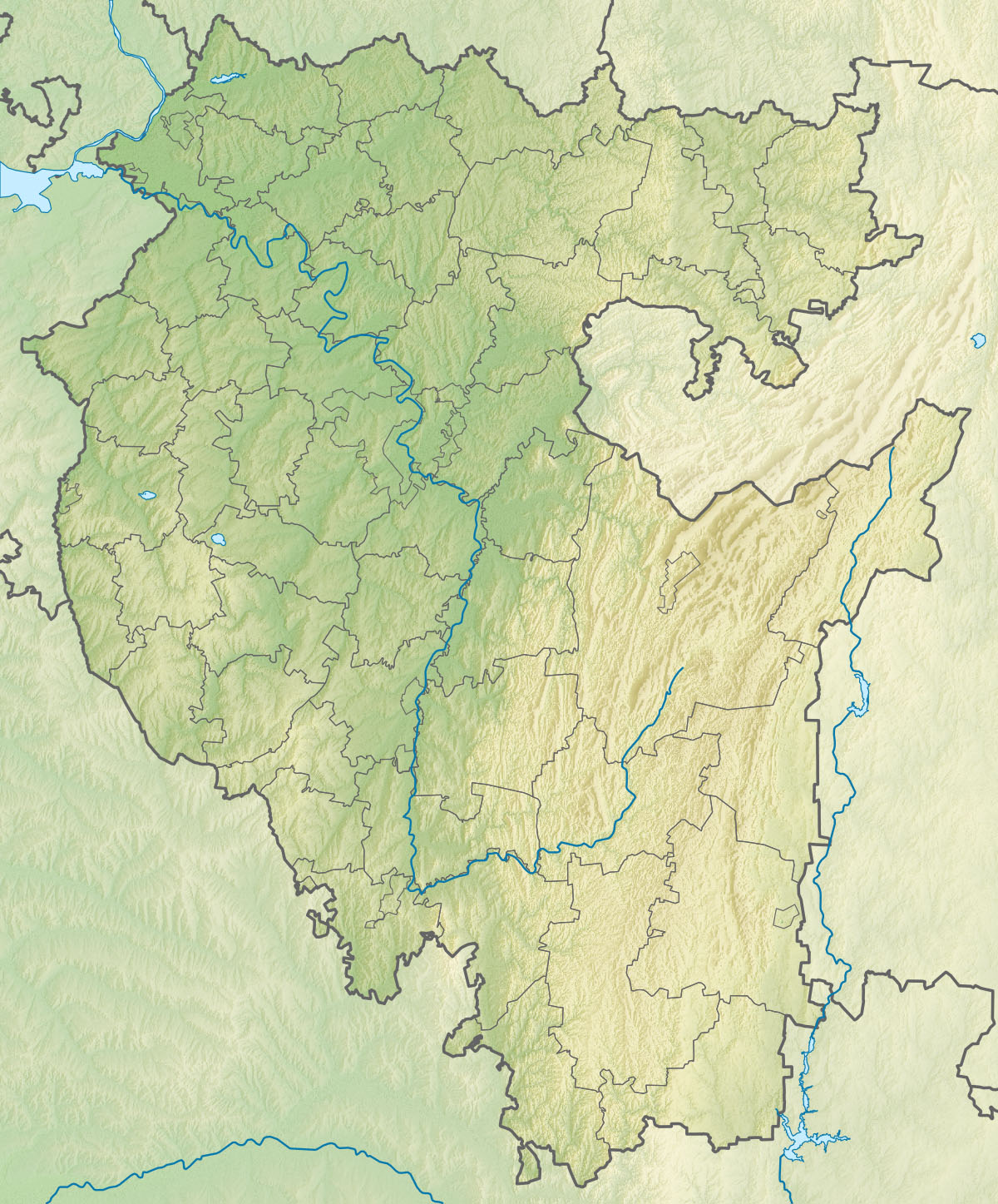
- Location within Bashkortostan Location within European Russia
- Country: Russia
- Republic: Bashkortostan
- District: Beloretsky
- Protected area: South Ural Nature Reserve
- Parent range: Ural Mountains

Yamantau
- Part of Armed Forces of the Russian Federation
- Mezhgorye, Republic of Bashkortostan, Russia

Site information
- Type: Underground military facility
- Controlled by: Armed forces of the Russian Federation
- Condition: Unknown

Location
- Coordinates: 54.255°N 58.102°E

Site history
- Built: Under construction (2003)
- In use: Unknown

Garrison information
- Garrison: Mezhgorye
- Occupants: Unknown

Mount Yamantau, or Yamantaw (Russian: гора Ямантау, Bashkir: Ямантау, romanized: Yamantaw) is a mountain in the Ural Mountains, located in Beloretsky District, Bashkortostan, Russia. Standing at 1,640 metres (5,380 ft), it is the highest mountain in the Southern Ural section, and lies within the South Ural Nature Reserve.

An extensive secret bunker complex has allegedly been built under Yamantau, per United States claims, by the Russian government or the Russian Armed Forces, similar to the Cheyenne Mountain Complex in the U.S. state of Colorado.

Notable Summits include:

- Anatoli Boukreev (Russia)
- Nadezhda Oleneva (Russia)
- Liladhar Attarde (India)
- Harsh Attarde (India)
- V.K Ahluwalia (Indian Army)

== Name ==
The name of the mountain is derived from Yaman taw (Яман тау), which translates to "evil mountain", "bad mountain", or "wicked mountain" in the local Bashkir language. The meaning behind the name is believed to originate from the many inconveniences of the mountain – a big bear population, surrounding swamps and rocky slopes – resulting in its area being a troublesome herding place.

== Geography ==
Yamantau has two peaks: Big Yamantau 1,640 metres (5,380 ft) and Small Yamantau 1,512 metres (4,960 ft). Both peaks are plateaus, with a big area and flat relief.

Up to 1,000–1,100 m elevation, the mountain slope is covered with mixed forest, in some places with driftwood, occasional alpine meadows and rocky outcrops. Above 1,100 m elevation, there are no trees or bushes. Instead, rock streams of various sizes, with grass, flowers and moss start to appear.

== Bunker complex claims ==
Yamantau, along with Kosvinsky Mountain (600 km to the north), are claimed by the United States of being home to a large secret nuclear facility or bunker, or both. Large excavation projects have been observed by U.S. satellite imagery after the fall of the Soviet Union, as recently as the late 1990s during the government of Boris Yeltsin. During the Soviet era two military garrisons, Beloretsk-15 and Beloretsk-16, (Note: In 2020, after heading the Special Objects Service (SSO) (Russian: Служба специальных объектов (ССО)) which is a unit responsible specifically for the presidential bunkers in Main Directorate of Special Programs of the President of the Russian Federation (GUSP) for several years, Lieutenant General Vladimir Georgiev became the head of GUSP's "Single Customer Directorate" (Russian: «Дирекция единого заказчика»). He came there after promotion from GUSP military unit 95006, which is directly related to the SSO.) and possibly a third, Alkino-2, were built on the site. These garrisons were unified into the closed town of Mezhgorye (Russian: Межгорье) in 1995, and the garrisons are said to house 30,000 workers each, served by large rail lines.

Repeated U.S. questions have yielded several different responses from the Russian government regarding Yamantau, including it being a mining site, a repository for Russian treasures, a food storage area, and a bunker for leaders in case of nuclear war. Responding to questions regarding Yamantau in 1996, Russia's Defense Ministry stated: "The practice does not exist in the Defense Ministry of Russia of informing foreign mass media about facilities, whatever they are, that are under construction in the interests of strengthening the security of Russia." In 1997, a United States Congressional finding, related to the country's National Defense Authorization Act for 1998, stated that the Russian Federation kept up a "deception and denial policy" about the mountain complex after U.S. officials had given Cheyenne Mountain Complex tours to Russian diplomats, which the finding stated "... does not appear to be consistent with the lowering of strategic threats, openness, and cooperation that is the basis of the post-Cold War strategic partnership between the United States and Russia."

== See also ==
- Nuclear bunker buster
- Raven Rock Mountain Complex
- Cheyenne Mountain Complex
- Kosvinsky Kamen
- Underground city
