= Command missile =

Missile with a payload issuing electronic commands

A command missile is a missile, the payload of which issues electronic commands. A command missile does not carry any destructive payload. Its payload is designed to be delivered to very high altitude rather than at ground targets.

A command missile might function as part of a mutually assured destruction scenario. In the event of a nuclear first strike being detected, the defending nation launches command missiles, which command retaliation from friendly units. Thus, retaliation is assured even if the nation's leadership, military chain of command, and communications infrastructure are destroyed by the first strike.

The United States operated a command missile system known as the Emergency Rocket Communications System (ERCS). In the event of a nuclear first strike against the continental United States, centrally located LGM-30 Minuteman missiles would be launched, each of which carried a payload that would electronically trigger a nuclear retaliation.

The Soviet Union was also known to operate command missiles in the Dead Hand system.
