= Kosvinsky Kamen =

Mountain in Russia

- Косвинский камень
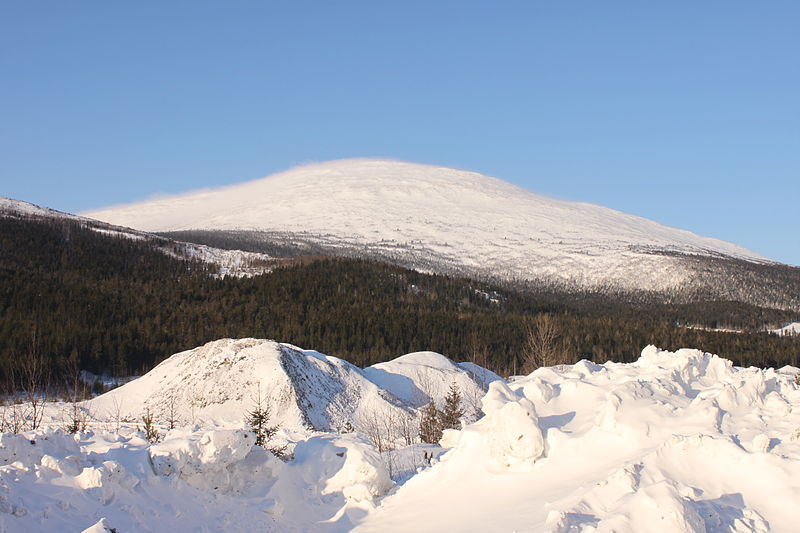

Highest point
- Elevation: 1,519 m (4,984 ft)
- Coordinates: 59°31′N 59°03′E

Geography
- Location: Russia
- Parent range: Ural Mountains

Mount Kosvinsky Kamen, Kosvinsky Mountain, Kosvinski Mountain, Kosvinsky Rock or Rostesnoy Rock (Russian: Косвинский камень, Косьвинский камень, Ростесной камень) is a mountain in the northern Urals, Sverdlovsk Oblast, Russia.

Its summit is bare of vegetation with an uneven rocky surface and small lakes fed by melting snow. The Kosva River flows from the mountain, hence the name.

The Great Soviet Encyclopedia describes Kosvinsky Rock as "mountain massif" of height 1,519 m. Its constitution is pyroxenites and dunites of lower and middle Paleozoic era. The slopes are covered with conifers with some birch up to 900–1,000 m, with alpine tundra above.

== Military ==
According to Jane's Defence Weekly, a command post bunker was built near the mountain as of 1994. It was designed to resist US earth penetrating weapons and serves a similar role as the American Cheyenne Mountain Complex. The timing of the Kosvinsky completion date is regarded as one explanation for US interest in a new nuclear bunker buster and the declaration of the deployment of the B61 Mod 11 in 1997: Kosvinsky is protected by about 1,000 feet (300 m) of granite.

US analysts believe that the command post of the Perimeter system is in the bunker under Kosvinsky Kamen mountain.

== See also ==
- Mount Yamantau - another Soviet/Russian subterranean facility
