= South Ural Nature Reserve =

Strict nature reserve in Bashkortostan and Chelyabinsk Oblast, Russia

- Russian: Южно-Уральский заповедник (Also: Yuzhno-Uralsky)
- IUCN category Ia (strict nature reserve)
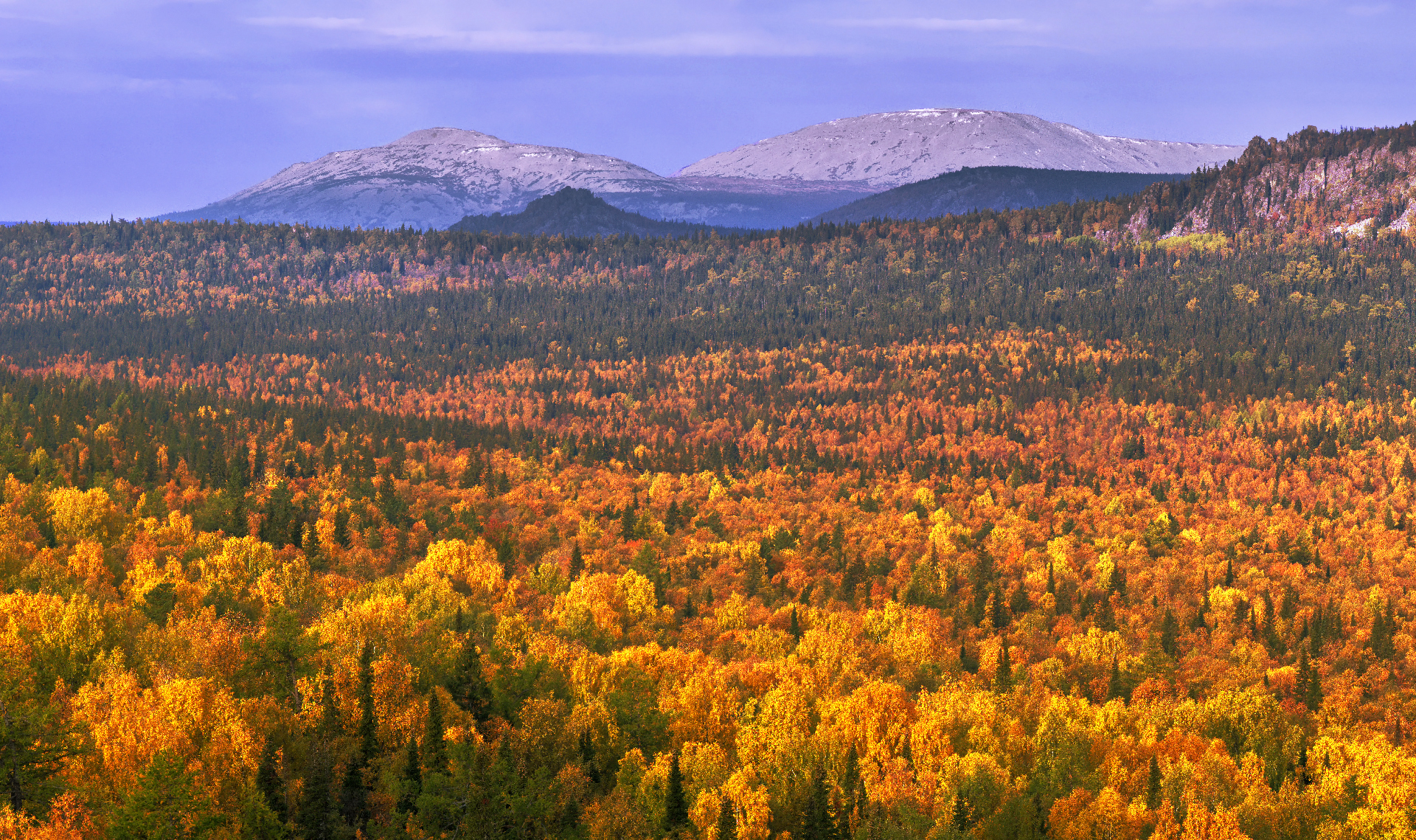
- Mt. Yamantau, the highest point in South Ural Mountains

- Location within Russia
- Location: Bashkortostan, and Chelyabinsk Oblast
- Nearest city: Beloretsk
- Coordinates: 54°20′48″N 57°53′9″E
- Area: 252,800 hectares (624,682 acres; 976 sq mi)
- Established: 1979
- Governing body: Ministry of Natural Resources and Environment (Russia)
- Website: http://www.south-ural-reserve.ru/

South Ural Nature Reserve (Russian: Южно-Уральский заповедник) (also Yuzhno-Uralsky) is a Russian 'zapovednik' (strict nature reserve) protecting mountain taiga ecosystems in the highest part of the Southern Ural Mountains. Several mountain ridges run through the territory: Mashak, Zigalga, Nara Kumardak and Yamantau. Mt. Yamantau reaches 1,640 metres (5,380 ft), and is the highest mountain in the Southern Urals. 90% of the reserve is situated in the Beloretsky District of Bashkortostan, and the remainder in Chelyabinsk Oblast. Ufa, the largest city of Bashkortostan, is about 200 km to the northwest.

== Topography ==
The South Ural Reserve terrain consists of several mountain ridges (Mashak, Zigalga, Nara Kumardak and Yamantau) running in parallel from southwest to northeast, with broad inter-mountain valleys and cross-river cuts that create a lattice structure. The area was not fully glaciated, but shows evidence of local glaciation (moraine deposits) on the mountain and plateaus. All of the rivers in the territory are classified as small rivers or streams; the longest is the Small Inzer River, which is 93 km long and runs entirely within the reserve boundaries. The streams have fast currents and rocky beds. There are several small bogs in the reserve. The South Urals reserve is surrounded on all sides by forestry zones.

The area has been heavily affected by successive waves of economic activity in the area. The region was the site of extensive iron foundries in the 1700s and 1800s, which the attendant pollution of rivers and extensive cutting of trees to feed the charcoal kilns. In the early 1900s, commercial logging expanded, and during the war several internment camps were built inside one of the borders along with a narrow gauge railroad. In the 1970s, roads, powerlines, and pipelines were laid across parts of the territory. In 1979, the reserve was established to restore and protect a large section of representative Southern Ural forest.

== Climate and ecoregion ==
South Ural is located in the Urals montane tundra and taiga ecoregion. This ecoregion covers the Ural Mountains in a band that is narrow from west-east, but runs up most of the divide between European and Asiatic Russia. It is a meeting zones of taiga and tundra tree and plant species.

The climate of the South Ural Reserve is Humid continental climate, warm summer (Köppen climate classification (Dfb)). This climate is characterized by large swings in temperature, both diurnally and seasonally, with mild summers and cold, snowy winters. In the South Ural Reserve, average annual precipitation is 667 mm, the growing season averages 168 days, and the average frost-free period, from May 30 to mid September, averages 107 days. At the highest elevations, the precipitation rises to 1,100 mm, and the frost-free period drops to 60 days.

== Flora and fauna ==
Forests cover 89% of the ground; they are a mix of light conifers (4 species) and deciduous (10 species, including aspen and birch). Above 1200 meters, the zone of mountain tundra is one of shrub-moss plant communities. Scientists on the reserve have recorded 700 species of vascular plants.

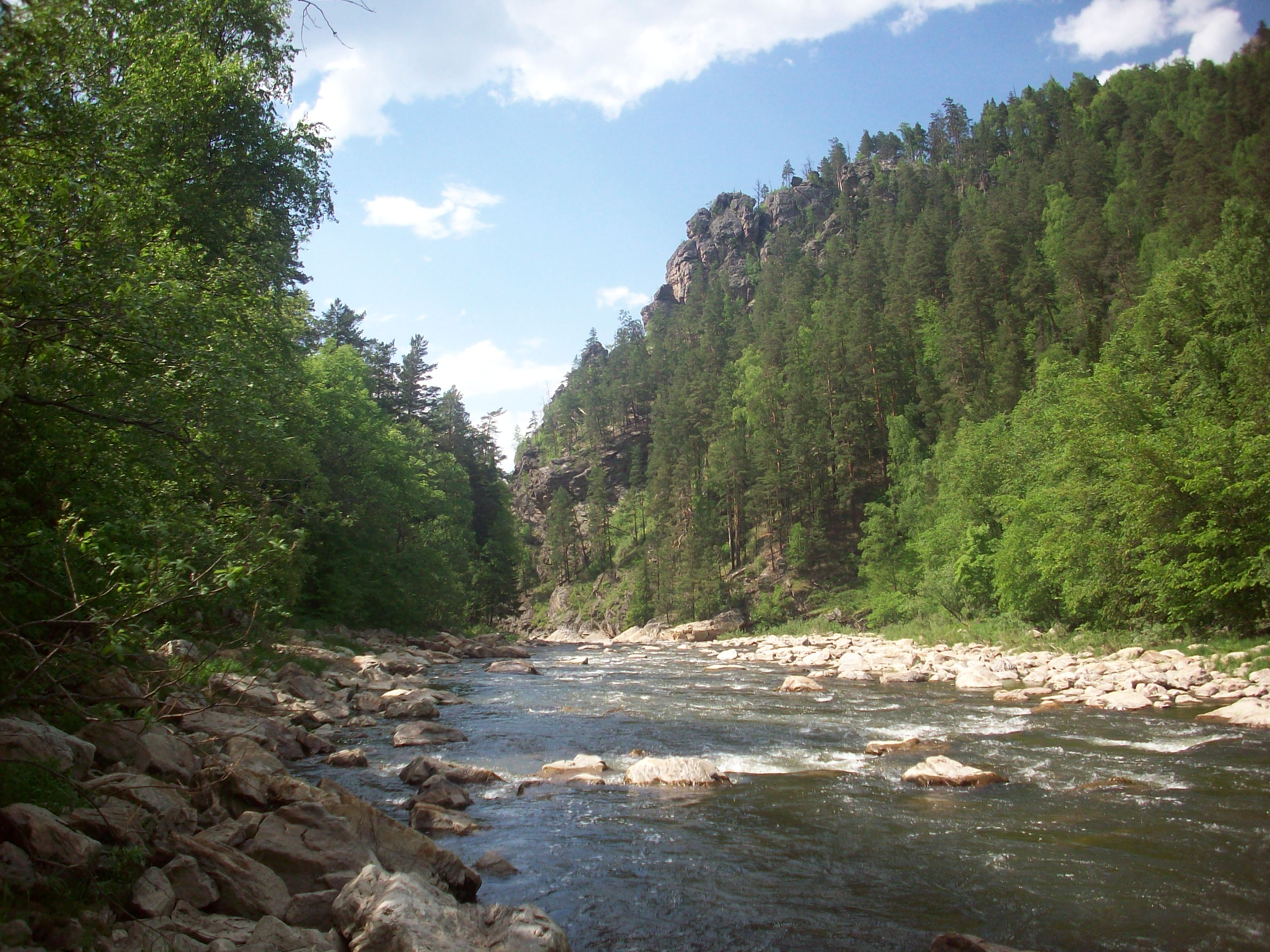
Small Inzer River, in the southwest of South Ural Reserve

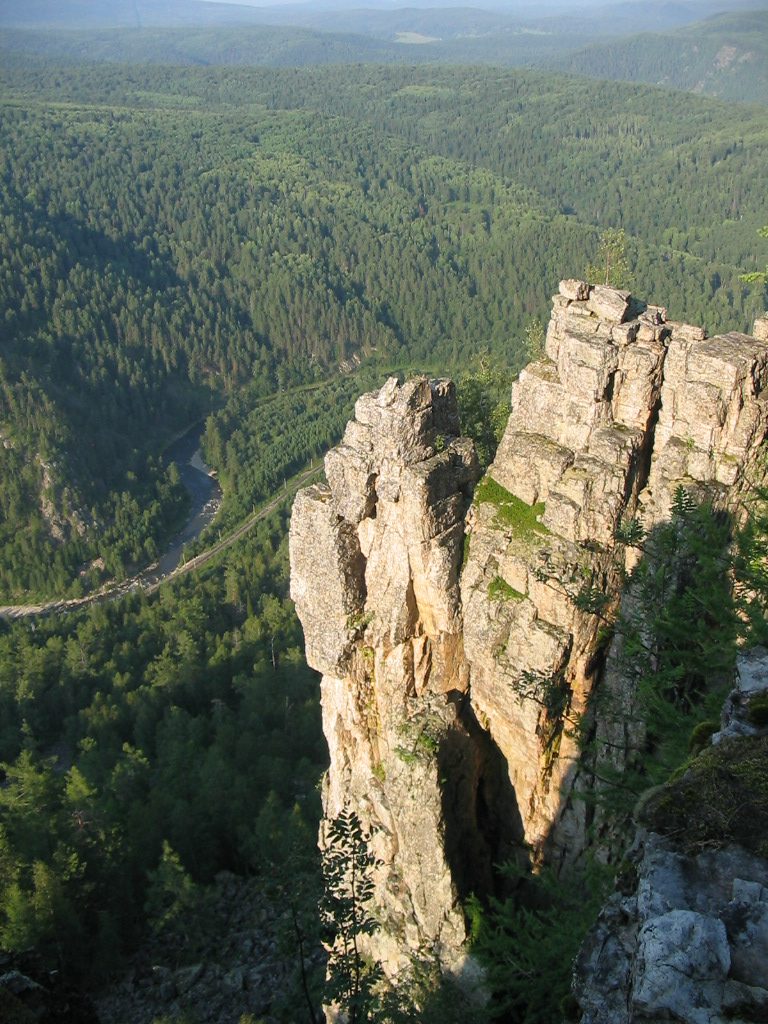
Inzer River from above

The mammals of the reserve are forest species. Moose are common, as a black bear. 13 different predator species are present (including wolves as permanent residents), indicating significant prey that include deer and elk. 50 different mammal species have been recorded. 168 species of birds have been recorded, with 132 nesting.

== Ecoeducation and access ==
As a strict nature reserve, the South Ural Reserve is mostly closed to the general public, although scientists and those with 'environmental education' purposes can make arrangements with park management for visits. The main office is in the town of Beloretsk, 90 km away.

== See also ==
- List of Russian Nature Reserves (class 1a 'zapovedniks')
