= Aleksandr Zheleznyakov =

- Александр Железняков
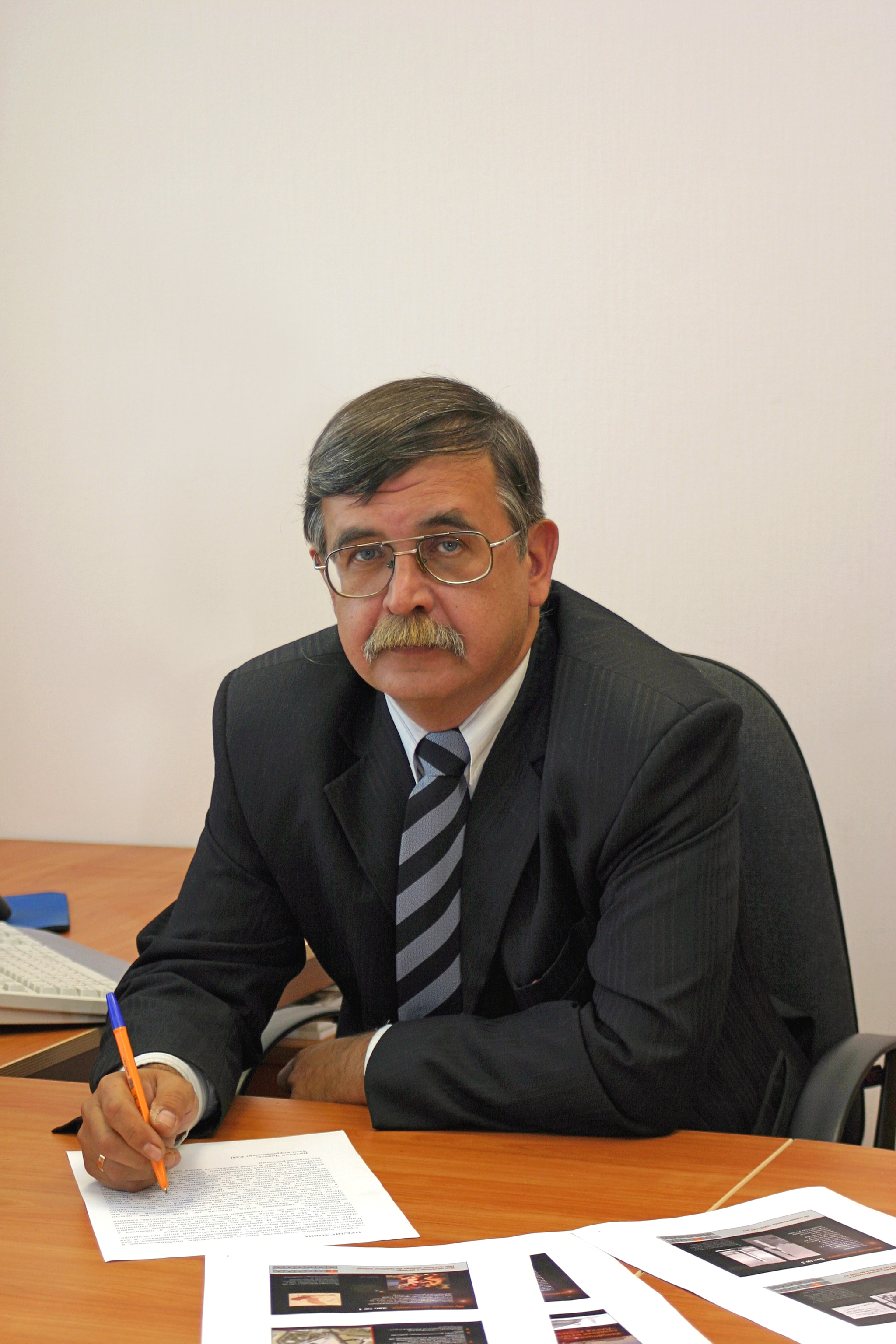
- Zheleznyakov in 2010
- Born: January 28, 1957 (age 68); Leningrad
- Occupation: Russian rocket engineer
- Known for: Engineer in Russian space program, writer, journalist

Aleksandr Borisovich Zheleznyakov (Russian: Алекса́ндр Бори́сович Железняко́в; born January 28, 1957) is a specialist in design and production of rocket and space systems. He is also a writer and journalist.

== Biography ==
Zheleznyakov graduated from Kalinin Polytechnical Institute (now Saint Petersburg State Polytechnical University), as a physicist engineer in 1980. He worked as an engineer at the Impulse engineering plant in Leningrad from 1980 to 1981 and at the Krasnaya Zarya (Red Dawn) facility from 1983 to 1989, where he rose to head of department. In 1989 he moved to the Raduga (Rainbow) experimental design bureau where he worked as a senior manager until 2001. From 2001 to 2007 he worked as advisor to the Director and Chief Designer of the Central R&D Institute for Robotics and Technical Cybernetics in Saint Petersburg. Since 2007 has served as Advisor to the President of the S.P. Korolev Rocket and Space Corporation Energia in Korolyov.

Since 1989 he has written 17 books and hundreds of articles popularizing the achievements of Russian and world astronautics. He has used the pseudonyms "Aleksandr Yurkevich", "Aleksandr Borisov", "Konstantin Ivanov", "A.Zh." and "K.I.".

== Membership ==
- The Federation of Russian Cosmonautics
- The Union of Journalists of Russia
- The International Union of Journalists
- The Union of Writers of St-Petersburg

== Awards and Prizes ==
- Medal of the Order of Merit for the Fatherland 2nd class (2007)
- Medal "In Commemoration of the 300th Anniversary of Saint Petersburg" (2003)
- Medal of Russian Aviation and Space Agency in the Honour of Forty-year Anniversary of the Spaceflight of Yuriy Gagarin
- Medal for Merit of Federation of Russian Cosmonautics
- Medals in the names of K. Tsiolkovsky, Y. Kondratyuk, S. Korolev, V. Glushko, M. Yangel, V. Tereshkova
- Medal of the Ukraine National Space Agency after M. Yangel
- Laureate of the A.R. Belyaev Literary Prize
- Medal of the Order "For Merit to the Fatherland" I (2014) and II (2007) degree

== Published books ==
- "Soviet Cosmonautics: the Chronicle of Emergencies and Catastrophes". St-Petersburg, 1998.
- "The Chronicles of the Space Age. Year 1957." St-Petersburg, 2002.
- "The Chronicles of the Space Age. Year 1958." St-Petersburg, 2002
- "When lifting off, the Rocket fell". St-Petersburg, 2003
- "The Chronicles of the Space Age. Year 1959." St-Petersburg, 2003
- "The Chronicles of the Space Age. Year 1960." St-Petersburg, 2003
- "The Chronicles of the Space Age. Year 1961." St-Petersburg, 2004
- "Secrets of Rocket Catastrophes". Moscow, 2004
- "Mir station: from triumph to...". St-Petersburg, 2006.
- "The Chronicles of the Space Age. Year 1962." St-Petersburg, 2006
- "The Space of Secret: myths and phantoms in the orbit". Moscow, 2006
- "Sex in Space". St-Petersburg, 2008.
- "The Main Line: Poems". St-Petersburg, 2009
- "The first in space. How the Soviet Union defeated the United States". Moscow, 2011
- "Secret space. Were there Gagarin's predecessors?" Moscow, 2011
- "From Vostok to Rassvet". St-Peterburg, 2011
- "Secrets of the American spaceflight". Moscow, 2011
