= Mezhgorye =

Mezhgorye (Russian: Межгорье) is the name of several inhabited localities in Russia.

Urban localities

- Mezhgorye, Republic of Bashkortostan, a closed town in the Republic of Bashkortostan

Rural localities

- Mezhgorye, Primorsky Krai, a selo in Kirovsky District of Primorsky Krai
