= Mezhgorye, Bashkortostan =

Closed town in Bashkortostan, Russia

Mezhgorye Межгорье
- Town

Other transcription(s)
  - Bashkir: Межгорье
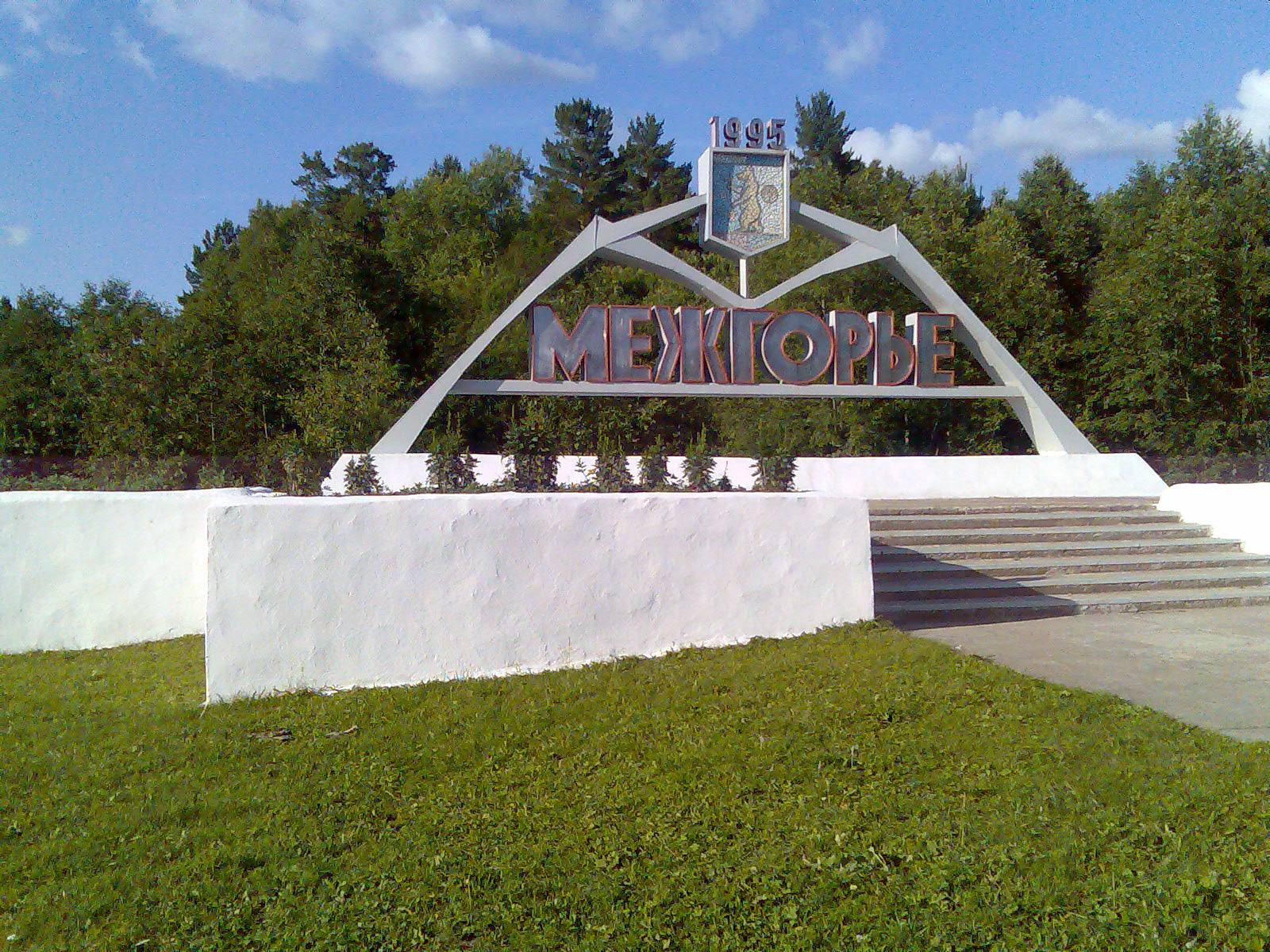
- Welcome sign at the town entrance

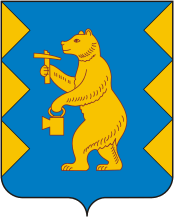
- Flag Coat of arms
- Interactive map of Mezhgorye
- Location of Mezhgorye Mezhgorye (Bashkortostan)
- Coordinates: 54°03′N 57°49′E
- Country: Russia
- Federal subject: Bashkortostan
- Founded: 1979
- Elevation: 560 m (1,840 ft)

Population (2010 Census)
  - Total: 17,352
  - Estimate (2021): 15,697 (−9.5%)

Administrative status
  - Subordinated to: closed administrative-territorial formation of Mezhgorye
  - Capital of: closed administrative-territorial formation of Mezhgorye

Municipal status
  - Urban okrug: Mezhgorye Urban Okrug
  - Capital of: Mezhgorye Urban Okrug
- Time zone: UTC+5 (MSK+2)
- Postal code: 453570–453571
- OKTMO ID: 80707000001

Mezhgorye (Russian: Межго́рье; Bashkir: Межгорье, romanized: Mejgorye IPA: [mˈэҙˈgʊ̞rˈjɪ]) is a closed town in the Republic of Bashkortostan, Russia, located in the southern Ural Mountains near Mount Yamantau, about 200 kilometers (120 mi) southeast of Ufa, the capital of the republic, on the banks of the Maly Inser River (a tributary of the Kama River). Population: 17,352 (2010 census); 19,082 (2002 census).

== History ==
Founded around 1979, it was known as Ufa-105 (Уфа́-105) and Beloretsk-16 (Белоре́цк-16) at the foot of Mount Yamantau (Russian: гора Ямантау). Town status was granted to it in 1995, at which time it was given its present name. It is the only closed town in Russia to be situated in a republic.

== Administrative and municipal status ==
Within the framework of administrative divisions, it is incorporated as the closed administrative-territorial formation of Mezhgorye—an administrative unit with the status equal to that of the districts. As a municipal division, the closed administrative-territorial formation of Mezhgorye is incorporated as Mezhgorye Urban Okrug.

The closed status of Mezhgorye means that in administrative terms it is subordinated directly to the federal government of Russia. The town comprises two microdistricts (former settlements), located 23 kilometers (14 mi) apart: Tatly (Татлы) and Solnechny (Со́лнечный) (formerly called Kuzyelga (Кузъелга)).

== Notable residents ==
- Olga Vilukhina (born 1988), biathlete
