= Beloretsk constituency =

Beloretsk single-member constituency
- Constituency of the Russian State Duma

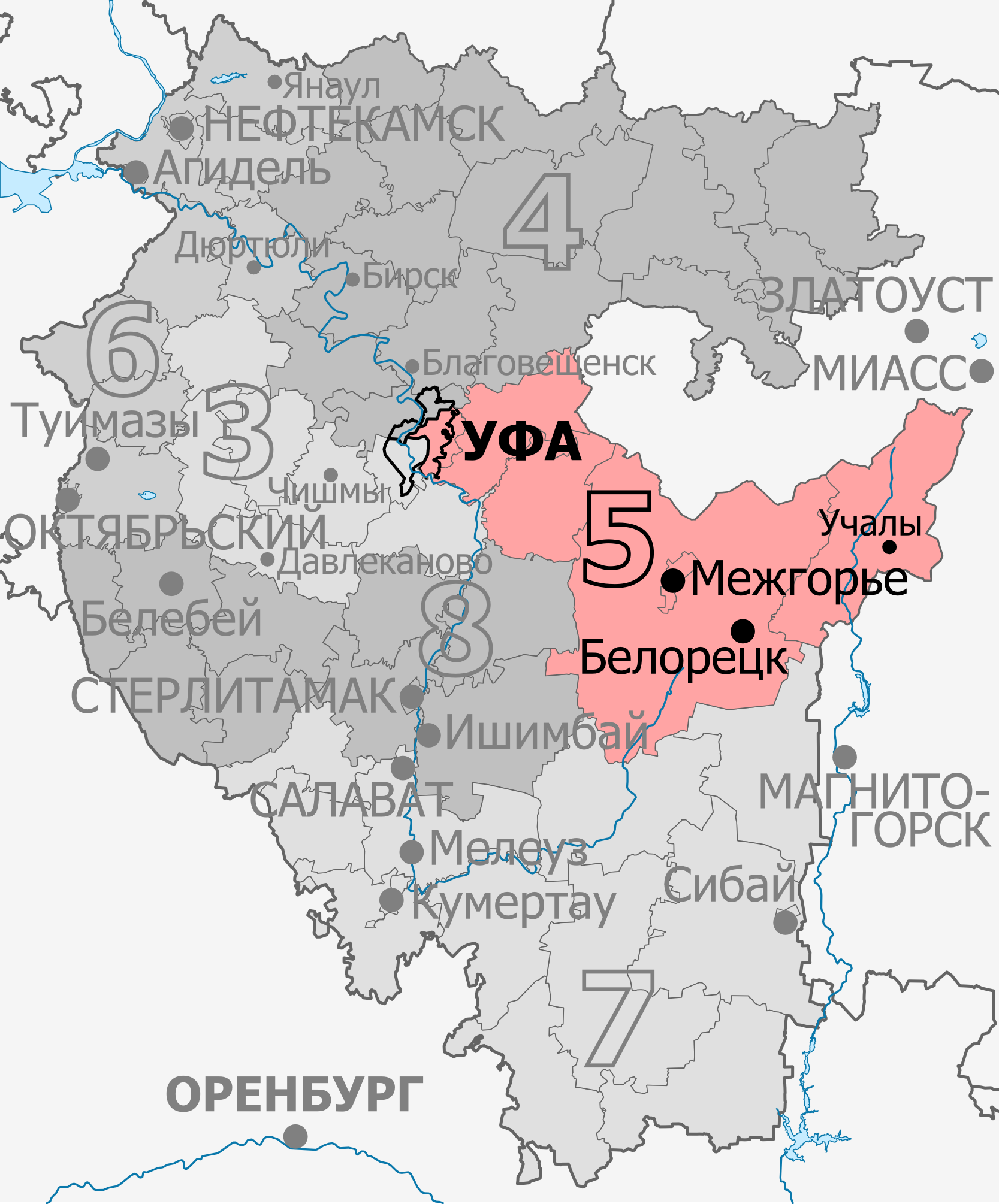
- Constituency boundaries since 2016
- Deputy: Elvira Aitkulova; United Russia
- Federal subject: Republic of Bashkortostan
- Districts: Arkhangelsky, Beloretsky, Iglinsky, ZATO Mezhgorye, Uchalinsky, Ufa (Kalininsky, Oktyabrsky), Ufimsky (Kirillovsky, Russko-Yurmashsky)
- Voters: 531,860 (2026)

The Beloretsk constituency (No. 5) is a Russian legislative constituency in Bashkortostan. The constituency covers parts of Ufa and east-central Bashkiria, stretching from eastern Ufa to the city of Beloretsk. Beloretsk constituency was created in 2015 from parts of former Kirovsky, Kalininsky and Kumertau constituencies.

The constituency has been represented since 2021 by United Russia deputy Elvira Aitkulova, Deputy Chairwoman of the State Assembly of the Republic of Bashkortostan and former journalist, who won the open seat, succeeding two-term United Russia incumbent Zugura Rakhmatullina.

== Boundaries ==
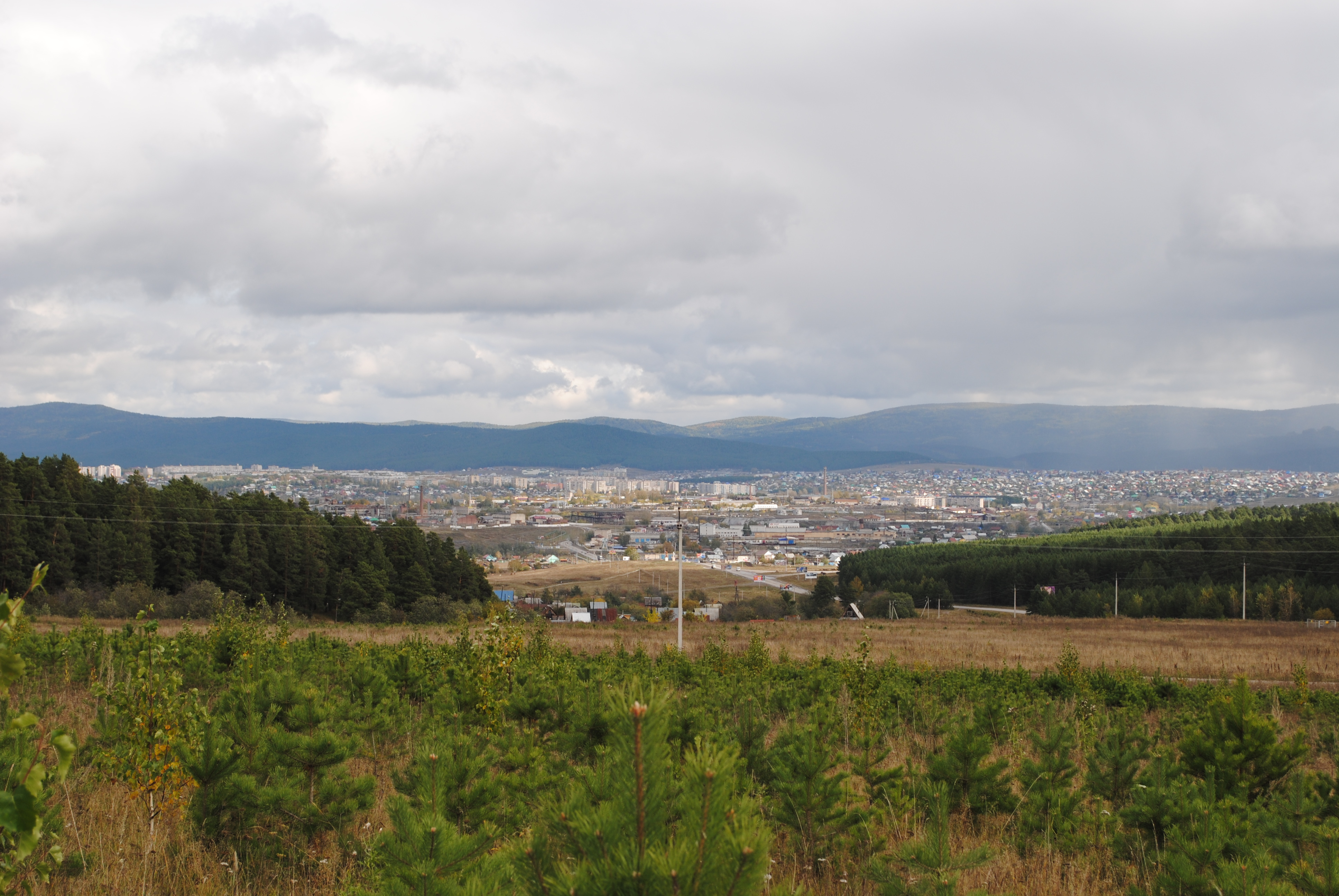
View of Beloretsk

2016–present: Arkhangelsky District, Beloretsky District, Iglinsky District, ZATO Mezhgorye, Uchalinsky District, Ufa (Kalininsky, Oktyabrsky), Ufimsky District (Kirillovo, Russky Yurmash)
The constituency was created in 2016 from northern parts of the former Kumertau constituency as well as Kalininsky and Oktyabrsky Districts of Ufa (from Kirovsky and Kalininsky constituencies, respectively).

== Members elected ==
Election	Member	Party
2016	Zugura Rakhmatullina	United Russia
2021	Elvira Aitkulova	United Russia
2026	Elvira Aitkulova	United Russia

== Election results ==
=== 2016 ===
==== Declared candidates ====
- Khanif Akhmedyanov (CPRF), machine serviceman
- Khasan Idiyatullin (CPCR), former Member of Iglinsky District Council (2011–2012), farmer, 2003 presidential candidate
- Ildar Isangulov (Yabloko), Member of State Assembly of the Republic of Bashkortostan (2013–present), TV presenter
- Gadzhimurad Omarov (A Just Russia), former Member of State Duma (2000–2003)
- Zugura Rakhmatullina (United Russia), Member of State Duma (2011–present)
- Murad Shafikov (The Greens), businessman
- Ivan Sukharev (LDPR), Member of State Duma (2011–present), 2014 presidential candidate
- Ramil Suleymanov (Rodina), individual entrepreneur

==== Withdrawn candidates ====
- Irek Valiyev (Patriots of Russia), shopping mall manager

==== Failed to qualify ====
- Vasilya Bochorishvili (Independent), pensioner
- Olga Izmaylova (Independent), physiotherapist

==== Declined ====
- Ramil Badamshin (United Russia), singer, songwriter (lost the primary)
- Oxana Savchenko (United Russia), 2008 and 2012 Paralympic Champion swimmer (lost the primary)

==== Results ====
Summary of the 18 September 2016 Russian legislative election in the Beloretsk constituency
Candidate	Party	Votes	%
Zugura Rakhmatullina	United Russia	155,315	43.80%
Ivan Sukharev	Liberal Democratic Party	71,720	20.22%
Gadzhimurad Omarov	A Just Russia	40,993	11.56%
Khanif Akhmedyanov	Communist Party	33,773	9.52%
Ildar Isangulov	Yabloko	27,449	7.74%
Khasan Idiyatullin	Communists of Russia	10,636	2.99%
Ramil Suleymanov	Rodina	5,564	1.57%
Murad Shafikov	The Greens	5,273	1.49%
Total		354,614	100%

=== 2021 ===
==== Declared candidates ====
- Elvira Aitkulova (United Russia), Deputy Chairwoman of the State Assembly of the Republic of Bashkortostan (2018–present), Member of State Assembly (2013–present)
- Radmir Burangulov (The Greens), children's camp director
- Arina Fairushina (RPSS), unemployed
- Zulfia Gaisina (Yabloko), secretary of the Bashkortostan Council for Human Rights and Civil Society (2019–present), 2019 head candidate
- Albert Gazizov (CPRF), Member of State Assembly of the Republic of Bashkortostan (2018–present), corporate executive
- Mikhail Korovin (Rodina), unemployed
- Konstantin Kulikov (New People), construction businessman
- Aleksandr Polyakov (CPCR), plumber, perennial candidate
- Eliana Saitova (SR–ZP), nonprofit head, former TV presenter
- Anatoly Shulayev (RPPSS), businessman
- Ivan Sukharev (LDPR), Member of State Duma (2011–present), 2014 and 2019 head candidate, 2016 candidate for this seat

==== Declined ====
- Zugura Rakhmatullina (United Russia), incumbent Member of State Duma (2011–present)

==== Results ====
Summary of the 17-19 September 2021 Russian legislative election in the Beloretsk constituency
Candidate	Party	Votes	%
Elvira Aitkulova	United Russia	228,980	59.23%
Albert Gazizov	Communist Party	48,746	12.61%
Ivan Sukharev	Liberal Democratic Party	45,276	11.71%
Aleksandr Polyakov	Communists of Russia	10,235	2.65%
Eliana Saitova	A Just Russia — For Truth	9,181	2.37%
Konstantin Kulikov	New People	7,988	2.07%
Anatoly Shulayev	Party of Pensioners	7,682	1.99%
Radmir Burangulov	The Greens	7,226	1.87%
Mikhail Korovin	Rodina	7,163	1.85%
Zulfia Gaisina	Yabloko	5,363	1.39%
Arina Fairushina	Russian Party of Freedom and Justice	4,485	1.16%
Total		386,580	100%

=== 2026 ===
==== Declared candidates ====
- Elvira Aitkulova (United Russia), incumbent Member of State Duma (2021–present)
- Yelena Bogatenkova (The Greens), individual entrepreneur
- Mikhail Korovin (Rodina), unemployed, 2021 candidate for this seat
- Igor Martov (CPRF), food businessman
- Radik Mingulov (A Just Russia), pharmaceutical businessman
- Ivan Sukharev (LDPR), Member of State Duma (2011–present), 2014, 2019 and 2024 head candidate, 2016 and 2021 candidate for this seat
- Ilshat Timeryanov (New People), businessman, 2024 head candidate

==== Declined ====
- Ramzia Karimova-Baibulatova (United Russia), Member of State Assembly of the Republic of Bashkortostan (2023–present), journalist (lost the primary)
- Gyuzel Nasyrova (United Russia), Head of Iglinsky District (2021–present) (lost the primary)
- Yuldash Yusupov (United Russia), Member of State Assembly of the Republic of Bashkortostan (2023–present), historian (lost the primary)

==== Results ====
Summary of the 18-20 September 2026 Russian legislative election in the Beloretsk constituency
Candidate	Party	Votes	%
Elvira Aitkulova (incumbent)	United Russia	244,229	62.27%
Ivan Sukharev	Liberal Democratic Party	49,362	12.59%
Igor Martov	Communist Party	34,693	8.85%
Ilshat Timeryanov	New People	24,301	6.20%
Radik Mingulov	A Just Russia	19,144	4.88%
Yelena Bogatenkova	The Greens	9,365	2.39%
Mikhail Korovin	Rodina	8,189	2.09%
Total		392,226	100%
