= Salavat constituency =

Salavat single-member constituency
- Constituency of the Russian State Duma

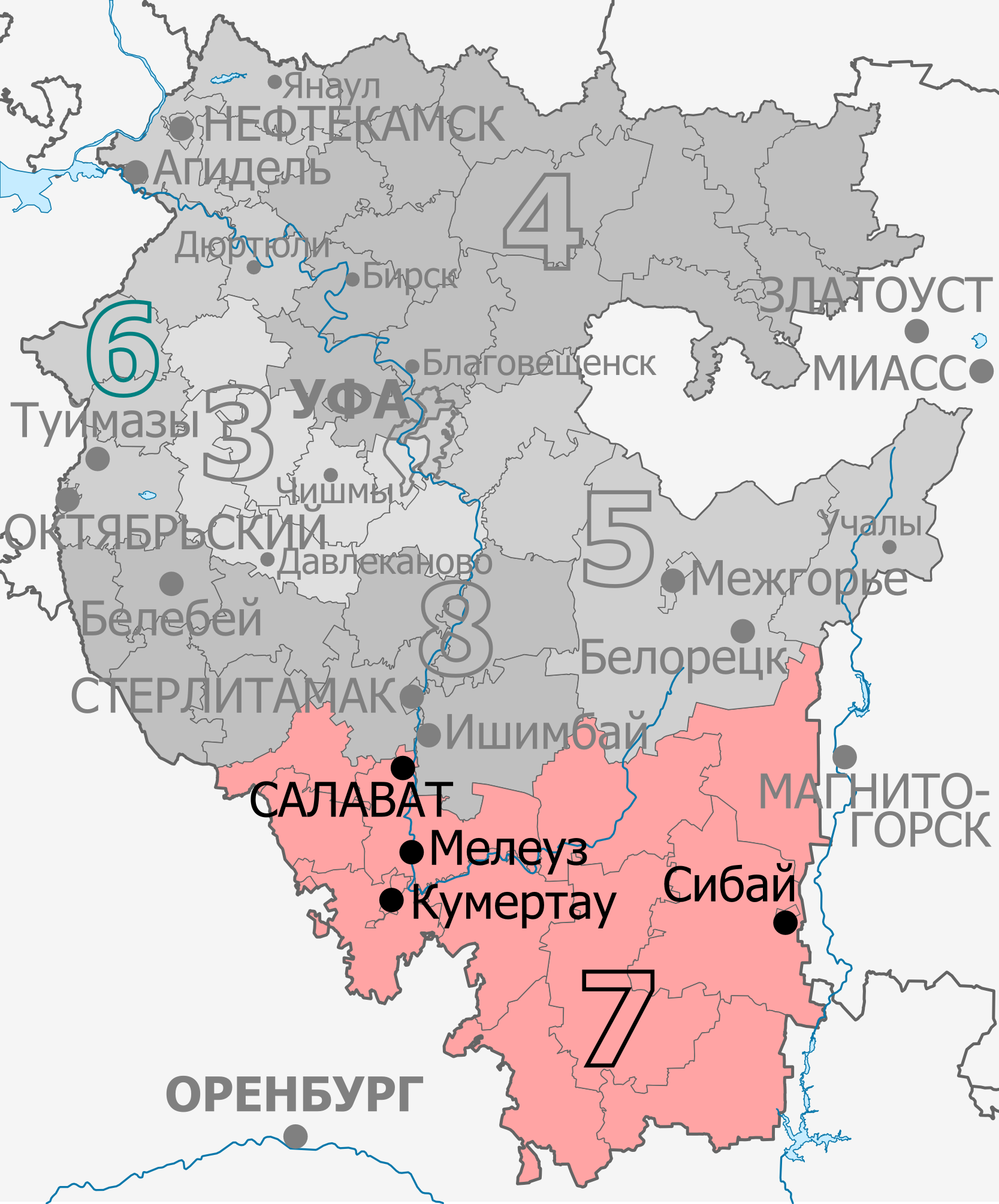
- Constituency boundaries since 2016
- Deputy: Zarif Baiguskarov; United Russia
- Federal subject: Republic of Bashkortostan
- Districts: Abzelilovsky, Baymaksky, Burzyansky, Fyodorovsky, Khaybullinsky, Kugarchinsky, Kumertau, Kuyurgazinsky, Meleuzovsky, Salavat, Sibay, Sterlibashevsky, Zianchurinsky, Zilairsky
- Voters: 436,800 (2026)

The Salavat constituency (No.7) (Note: Baymak constituency No.2 in 1993-1995, Sibay constituency No.6 in 1995-2003, Kumertau constituency No.5 in 2003-2007) is a Russian legislative constituency in Bashkortostan. The constituency covers southern Bashkiria. The present day Salavat constituency was created in 2015 from most of former Kumertau constituency.

The constituency has been represented since 2016 by United Russia deputy Zarif Baiguskarov, the former Chief Bailiff of Bashkortostan.

== Boundaries ==
1993–1995 Baymak constituency: Abzelilovsky District, Baymak, Baymaksky District, Beloretsk, Beloretsky District, Burzyansky District, Khaybullinsky District, Kugarchinsky District, Kumertau, Kuyurgazinsky District, Meleuz, Meleuzovsky District, Sibay, Uchalinsky District, Uchaly, Zianchurinsky District, Zilairsky District
The constituency covered the entirety of southern Bashkiria and east-central parts of the republic along the Ural Mountains, including the industrial and mining towns of Baymak, Beloretsk, Kumertau, Meleuz, Sibay and Uchaly.

1995–2003 Sibay constituency: Abzelilovsky District, Baymak, Baymaksky District, Beloretsk, Beloretsky District, Burzyansky District, Khaybullinsky District, Kugarchinsky District, Kumertau, Kuyurgazinsky District, Meleuz, Meleuzovsky District, Sibay, Uchalinsky District, Uchaly, Zianchurinsky District, Zilairsky District
The constituency retained its territory but changed its name from Baymak to Sibay constituency.

2003–2007 Kumertau constituency: Abzelilovsky District, Baymak, Baymaksky District, Beloretsk, Beloretsky District, Burzyansky District, Fyodorovsky District, Khaybullinsky District, Kugarchinsky District, Kumertau, Kuyurgazinsky District, Meleuz, Meleuzovsky District, Mezhgorye, Sibay, Uchalinsky District, Uchaly, Zianchurinsky District, Zilairsky District
The constituency was slightly altered after the 2003 redistricting, retaining all of its former territory and gaining only small rural Fyodorovsky District from the neighbouring Sterlitamak constituency. Sibay constituency also changed its name to Kumertau constituency.

2016–present: Abzelilovsky District, Baymaksky District, Burzyansky District, Fyodorovsky District, Khaybullinsky District, Kugarchinsky District, Kumertau, Kuyurgazinsky District, Meleuzovsky District, Salavat, Sibay, Sterlibashevsky District, Zianchurinsky District, Zilairsky District
The constituency was re-created for the 2016 election and received a new name "Salavat constituency". This seat retained all of southern Bashkiria but lost east-central part of the republic from Beloretsk to Uchaly to the new Beloretsk constituency. Instead the constituency was pushed to the north-west gaining Salavat, a major centre of petrochemical industry, and Sterlibashevsky District from the Sterlitamak constituency.

== Members elected ==
Election	Member	Party
1993	Akhmetgali Galiyev	Independent
1995	Rasul Shugurov	Communist Party
1999	Khalil Barlybayev	Fatherland – All Russia
2003	Kamilya Davletova	United Russia
2007	Proportional representation - no election by constituency	
2011	Proportional representation - no election by constituency	
2016	Zarif Baiguskarov	United Russia
2021	Zarif Baiguskarov	United Russia
2026	Zarif Baiguskarov	United Russia

== Election results ==
=== 1993 ===
==== Declared candidates ====
- Azat Abdullin (Independent), writer, playwright
- Akhmetgali Galiyev (Independent), sovkhoz director
- Rim Niyazgulov (Independent), businessman, Muslim activist
- Nikolay Pavlov (Independent), union leader
- Gazim Shafikov (PRES), writer, poet

==== Results ====
Summary of the 12 December 1993 Russian legislative election in the Baymak constituency
Candidate	Party	Votes	%
Akhmetgali Galiyev	Independent	95,870	28.40%
Nikolay Pavlov	Independent	–	25.18%
Azat Abdullin	Independent	–	–
Rim Niyazgulov	Independent	–	–
Gazim Shafikov	Party of Russian Unity and Accord	–	–
Total		337,530	100%

=== 1995 ===
==== Declared candidates ====
- Khalil Barlybayev (NDR), former Chairman of the Bashkortostan State Committee on State Property Management (1992–1995)
- Vener Sakhautdinov (Independent), Member of State Assembly of the Republic of Bashkortostan (1995–present), Bashkir State Medical University department of faculty surgery head
- Boris Shcherbakov (LDPR), factory worker
- Viktor Shingarov (DPP), middle school teacher
- Rasul Shugurov (CPRF), sovkhoz director
- Rinat Sultanov (Yabloko), Maimonides State Academy faculty of philosophy and law dean

==== Declined ====
- Akhmetgali Galiyev (BIR), incumbent Member of State Duma (1994–present) (ran on the party list)

==== Results ====
Summary of the 17 December 1995 Russian legislative election in the Sibay constituency
Candidate	Party	Votes	%
Rasul Shugurov	Communist Party	104,701	28.68%
Vener Sakhautdinov	Independent	88,282	24.18%
Khalil Barlybayev	Our Home – Russia	76,614	20.98%
Boris Shcherbakov	Liberal Democratic Party	37,462	10.26%
Viktor Shingarov	Cause of Peter the First	20,827	5.70%
Rinat Sultanov	Yabloko	15,018	4.11%
against all		16,438	4.50%
Total		365,126	100%

=== 1999 ===
==== Declared candidates ====
- Khalil Barlybayev (OVR), former Chairman of the Bashkortostan State Committee on State Property Management (1992–1995), 1995 NDR candidate for this seat
- Ildar Isangulov (ROS), aide to State Duma member
- Dmitry Khrustalev (Yabloko), television executive, journalist
- Rasul Shugurov (CPRF), incumbent Member of State Duma (1996–present)

==== Withdrawn candidates ====
- Akhtar Buskunov (Independent), Bashkir cultural centre director
- Faizulla Shaikhislamov (Independent), security guard

==== Failed to qualify ====
- Viktor Arkhipov (LDPR), pensioner

==== Did not file ====
- Igor Konev (DN)

==== Results ====
Summary of the 19 December 1999 Russian legislative election in the Sibay constituency
Candidate	Party	Votes	%
Khalil Barlybayev	Fatherland – All Russia	205,452	56.32%
Rasul Shugurov (incumbent)	Communist Party	77,080	21.13%
Dmitry Khrustalev	Yabloko	35,534	9.74%
Ildar Isangulov	Russian All-People's Union	13,130	3.60%
against all		25,522	7.00%
Total		364,804	100%

=== 2003 ===
==== Declared candidates ====
- Aleksandr Agafonov (Independent), former industrial executive
- Khalil Barlybayev (Independent), incumbent Member of State Duma (2000–present)
- Kamilya Davletova (United Russia), Chairwoman of the Bashkortostan State Committee on Youth Policy (1997–present)
- Airat Dilmukhametov (Independent), Bashkir nationalist
- Ildar Isangulov (Independent), human rights activist, 1999 candidate for this seat
- Nil Ishemgulov (PVR-RPZh), historian
- Yekaterina Kaftunova (ORP Rus'), glove knitter
- Dmitry Khrustalev (Yabloko), party official, 1999 candidate for this seat
- Gilmitdin Kildibayev (APR), Khaybullinsky District administration staffer
- Fanil Nurgalin (Independent), nonprofit president
- Azamat Saitov (Independent), journalist
- Rasul Shugurov (CPRF), former Member of State Duma (1996–1999), 2003 presidential candidate
- Yazar Utarbayev (VR–ES), prorector of the Bashkir State Medical University
- Rafail Yelkibayev (Rodina), corporate executive

==== Did not file ====
- Akram Khudaigulov (Independent), businessman
- Aleksandr Poluektov (KPE), corporate executive
- Aleksandr Selivanov (Independent), former prorector of the Russian Presidential Academy of Public Administration (2002–2003)

==== Results ====
Summary of the 7 December 2003 Russian legislative election in the Kumertau constituency
Candidate	Party	Votes	%
Kamilya Davletova	United Russia	182,358	47.92%
Rasul Shugurov	Communist Party	31,566	8.30%
Khalil Barlybayev (incumbent)	Independent	26,644	7.00%
Aleksandr Agafonov	Independent	25,175	6.62%
Airat Dilmukhametov	Independent	18,824	4.95%
Ildar Isangulov	Independent	18,569	4.88%
Dmitry Khrustalev	Yabloko	12,265	3.22%
Yazar Utarbayev	Great Russia – Eurasian Union	7,737	2.03%
Yekaterina Kaftunova	United Russian Party Rus'	6,106	1.60%
Fanil Nurgalin	Independent	4,691	1.23%
Azamat Saitov	Independent	4,604	1.21%
Gilmitdin Kildibayev	Agrarian Party	3,284	0.86%
Nil Ishemgulov	Party of Russia's Rebirth-Russian Party of Life	3,116	0.82%
Rafail Yelkibayev	Rodina	2,122	0.56%
against all		22,084	5.80%
Total		380,836	100%

=== 2016 ===
==== Declared candidates ====
- Aigul Akhmetyanova (LDPR), aide to State Duma member Ivan Sukharev
- Zarif Baiguskarov (United Russia), Chief Bailiff of Bashkortostan (2005–present)
- Radis Gumerov (Rodina), lawyer
- Yunir Kutluguzhin (CPRF), first secretary of the party regional committee, 2014 presidential candidate
- Boris Makhov (The Greens), retired rescuer
- Pavel Mashko (Party of Growth), individual entrepreneur
- Nina Ramazanova (CPCR), pensioner
- Olga Sapozhnikova (Patriots of Russia), inventory bureau foreman
- Rail Sarbayev (A Just Russia), former Prime Minister of Bashkortostan (2008–2010), 2014 GS presidential candidate

==== Failed to qualify ====
- Vitaly Sidorov (Independent), businessman

==== Did not file ====
- Sergey Zubakov (Independent), attorney

==== Declined ====
- Timur Khakimov (United Russia), Member of State Assembly of the Republic of Bashkortostan (2013–present), oil businessman (lost the primary)
- Rasikh Khamitov (United Russia), former Head of the Rosnedra Regional Office (2007–2013) (lost the primary)
- Salia Murzabayeva (United Russia), Member of State Duma (2007–present) (lost the primary)

==== Results ====
Summary of the 18 September 2016 Russian legislative election in the Salavat constituency
Candidate	Party	Votes	%
Zarif Baiguskarov	United Russia	174,345	55.34%
Rail Sarbayev	A Just Russia	51,379	16.31%
Yunir Kutluguzhin	Communist Party	43,405	13.78%
Aigul Akhmetyanova	Liberal Democratic Party	17,129	5.44%
Nina Ramazanova	Communists of Russia	6,575	2.09%
Olga Sapozhnikova	Patriots of Russia	5,091	1.62%
Radis Gumerov	Rodina	4,542	1.44%
Boris Makhov	The Greens	3,571	1.13%
Pavel Mashko	Party of Growth	2,995	0.95%
Total		315,036	100%

=== 2021 ===
==== Declared candidates ====
- Rustem Akhtamyanov (RPPSS), nonprofit director
- Zarif Baiguskarov (United Russia), incumbent Member of State Duma (2016–present)
- Rafael Kharisov (SR–ZP), Member of Arkhangelsky District Council (2020–present), businessman
- Dmitry Kolesnikov (Party of Growth), tourism businessman
- Vyacheslav Levkovich (Rodina), individual entrepreneur
- Nina Ramazanova (CPCR), perennial candidate, 2016 candidate for this seat
- Ilgiz Suyundukov (CPRF), Bashkir State University, Sibay branch faculty of natural sciences and mathematics dean
- Maksim Vlasenko (LDPR), Member of State Assembly of the Republic of Bashkortostan (2019–present), HR manager
- Sergey Zubakov (The Greens), attorney, 2016 Independent candidate for this seat

==== Failed to qualify ====
- Ivan Belov (Independent), individual entrepreneur
- Aleksandr Kondratets (Independent), electrician
- Tagir Vakhitov (Independent), unemployed

==== Results ====
Summary of the 17-19 September 2021 Russian legislative election in the Salavat constituency
Candidate	Party	Votes	%
Zarif Baiguskarov (incumbent)	United Russia	223,393	64.50%
Ilgiz Suyundukov	Communist Party	46,187	13.34%
Nina Ramazanova	Communists of Russia	14,904	4.30%
Rafael Kharisov	A Just Russia — For Truth	13,242	3.82%
Rustem Akhtamyanov	Party of Pensioners	12,182	3.52%
Sergey Zubakov	The Greens	11,653	3.36%
Maksim Vlasenko	Liberal Democratic Party	10,781	3.11%
Dmitry Kolesnikov	Party of Growth	5,400	1.56%
Vyacheslav Levkovich	Rodina	3,348	0.97%
Total		346,358	100%

=== 2026 ===
==== Declared candidates ====
- Ilgam Abdullin (RPPSS), sports school director
- Zarif Baiguskarov (United Russia), incumbent Member of State Duma (2016–present)
- Tagir Gafarov (New People), oil worker
- Ilshat Garifullin (Rodina), entrepreneur
- Andrey Gaziyev (The Greens), Member of Salavat Council (2020–present), businessman
- Timur Kamilov (A Just Russia), Member of State Assembly of the Republic of Bashkortostan (2023–present), construction executive
- Yunir Kutluguzhin (CPRF), Member of State Assembly of the Republic of Bashkortostan (2017–present), 2014 and 2019 head candidate, 2016 candidate for this seat
- Eduard Sardarov (LDPR), Member of State Assembly of the Republic of Bashkortostan (2023–present), attorney

==== Declined ====
- Ramil Badamshin (United Russia), Member of State Assembly of the Republic of Bashkortostan (2023–present), singer, songwriter (lost the primary)
- Vadim Nurkayev (United Russia), Member of State Assembly of the Republic of Bashkortostan (2023–present) (lost the primary)

==== Results ====
Summary of the 18-20 September 2026 Russian legislative election in the Salavat constituency
Candidate	Party	Votes	%
Zarif Baiguskarov (incumbent)	United Russia	249,225	70.12%
Timur Kamilov	A Just Russia	29,103	8.19%
Yunir Kutluguzhin	Communist Party	14,604	4.11%
Ilgam Abdullin	Party of Pensioners	13,223	3.72%
Andrey Gaziyev	The Greens	13,183	3.71%
Eduard Sardarov	Liberal Democratic Party	11,255	3.17%
Ilshat Garifullin	Rodina	10,808	3.04%
Tagir Gafarov	New People	10,445	2.94%
Total		355,411	100%
