= 2024 Bashkir head election =

Russian local election

- 6–8 September 2024
- Turnout: 72.24%
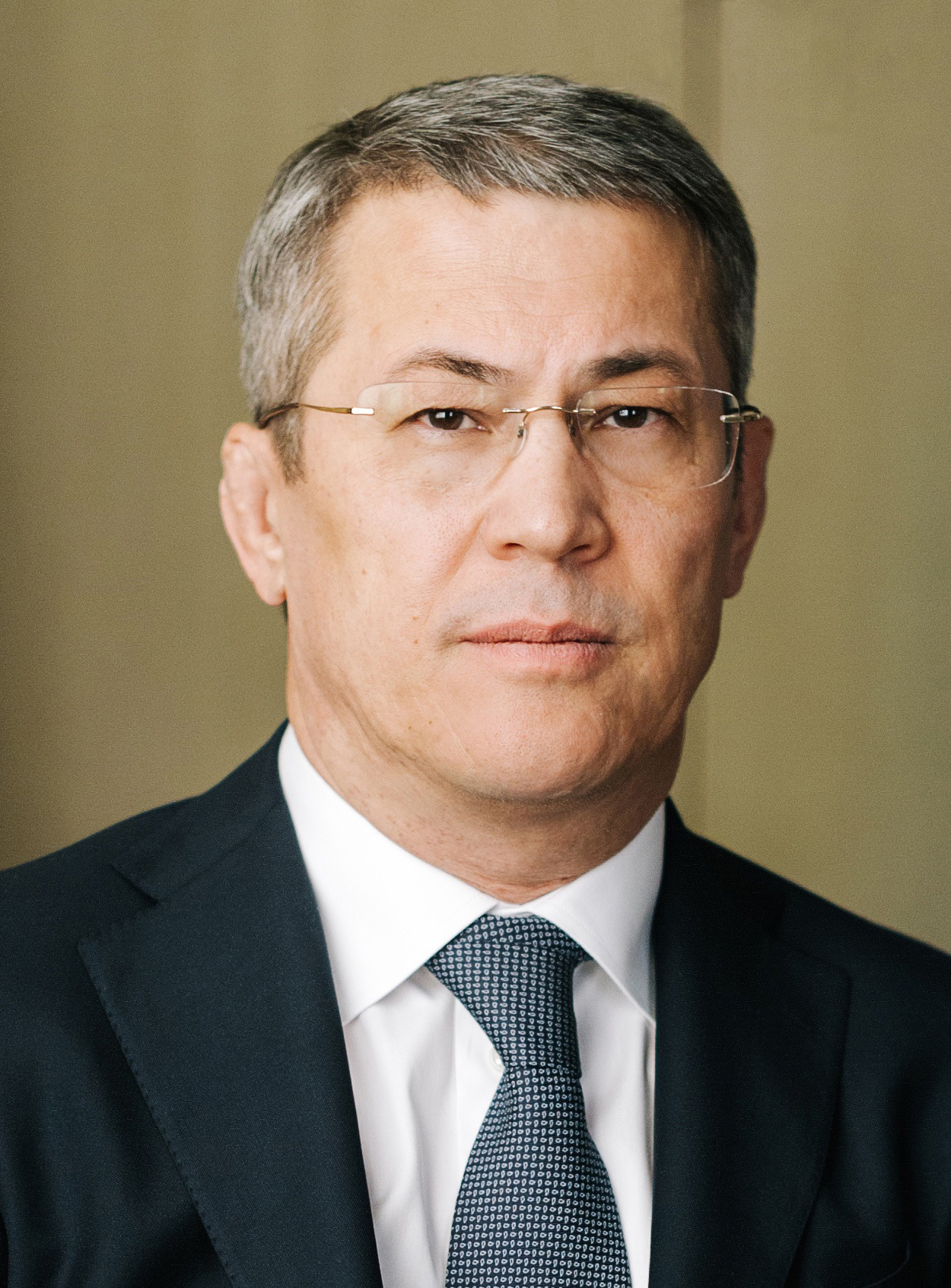
		CPRF
Candidate	Radiy Khabirov	Artur Shaynurov
Party	United Russia	CPRF
Popular vote	1,724,962	149,492
Percentage	80.21%	6.95%
Head before election
Radiy Khabirov
United Russia
Head-elect
Radiy Khabirov
United Russia

The 2024 Republic of Bashkortostan head election took place on 6–8 September 2024, on common election day. Incumbent Head Radiy Khabirov was reelected to a second term in office.

== Background ==
In October 2018 two-term incumbent Head of the Republic of Bashkortostan Rustem Khamitov announced his resignation for personal reasons. President Vladimir Putin approved Khamitov's resignation and appointed Krasnogorsk Mayor Radiy Khabirov new acting Head of Bashkortostan. Khabirov previously served as chief of staff to former Bashkir President Murtaza Rakhimov in 2003–2008 and then left the republic to work for the Presidential Administration of Russia.

Khabirov ran for a full term as United Russia candidate and easily won the 2019 election with 82.02% of the vote. His nearest challenger, State Assembly member Yunir Kutluguzhin (CPRF), received only 6.89%, while the remaining six candidates split the rest of 10.17% combined.

Early in his term Khabirov faced large-scale ecological protests in August 2020, when activists opposed limestone mining at the protected mountain Kushtau. Up to a 3,000 people participated in the protests at the site, which ultimately resulted in mining cessation and protected status for Kushtau. Another round of demonstration occurred in January 2024 in Baymak and Ufa when around 5,000–10,000 people protested the imprisonment of activist Fail Alsynov, who was among leaders of the Kushtau unrest.

Despite ecological protests and presumable conflict with the clan of former President Rakhimov, Khabirov was attributed with industrial growth and attraction of investments into the republic. Under Khabirov's leadership Bashkortostan also became one of few regions, where United Russia improved its result in the 2021 Russian legislative election (up 10 points compared to the 2016 election). Khabirov also led United Russia list in the 2023 State Assembly election, where the ruling party received 68.92% of the vote, improving its previous result by 10.6 points and gaining 8 more seats.

In April 2024 during a meeting with President Vladimir Putin Head Khabirov announced his intention to run for a second term and received Putin's endorsement.

== Candidates ==
In the Republic of Bashkortostan candidates for Head can be nominated only by registered political parties. Candidate for Head of the Republic of Bashkortostan should be a Russian citizen and at least 30 years old. Candidates for Head should not have a foreign citizenship or residence permit. Each candidate in order to be registered is required to collect at least 5% of signatures of members and heads of municipalities. Also head candidates present 3 candidacies to the Federation Council and election winner later appoints one of the presented candidates.

=== Declared ===
Candidate name, political party		Occupation	Status	Ref.
Radiy Khabirov; United Russia	Radiy Khabirov	Incumbent Head of the Republic of Bashkortostan (2018–present)	Registered	
Vladimir Nagorny; SR–ZP		Member of State Assembly of the Republic of Bashkortostan (2018–present)	Registered	
Artur Shaynurov; Communist Party		Deputy Chairman of the Ufa City Council (2021–present); Former Deputy Prime Minister of the Republic of Bashkortostan (2013–2017)	Registered	
Ivan Sukharev; Liberal Democratic Party	Ivan Sukharev	Member of State Duma (2011–present); 2014 and 2019 head candidate	Registered	
Ilshat Timeryanov; New People		Businessman	Registered	

=== Declined ===
- Vladimir Barabash (Civilian Power), former Chairman of the Bashkir Council on Human Rights (2019–2022), 2019 head candidate
- Azamat Galin, entrepreneur, community activist
- Dilara Gundorova, community activist, former public official
- Vladimir Kobzev (RPPSS), community activist, blogger, 2019 head candidate
- Marat Mirkhaydarov (United Russia), First Deputy Chairman of the Government of Zabaykalsky Krai (2019–2020, 2023–present)

=== Candidates for Federation Council ===
Gubernatorial candidate, political party	Candidates for Federation Council	Status
Radiy Khabirov; United Russia	Lilia Gumerova, incumbent Senator (2014–present), Chairwoman of the Council Committee on Science, Education, and Culture (2019–present); Salavat Khusainov, Deputy Chairman of the State Assembly of the Republic of Bashkortostan (2023–present), Member of the State Assembly (2020–present); Adelina Zagidullina, 2020 Olympic Champion fencer	Registered
Vladimir Nagorny; SR–ZP	* Flyur Nurlygayanov, Member of State Assembly of the Republic of Bashkortostan (2023–present) * Yekaterina Samsonova, chief of staff to the party regional office * Rustam Shorov, Member of State Assembly of the Republic of Bashkortostan (2023–present)	Registered
Artur Shaynurov; Communist Party	* Yunir Kutluguzhin, Member of State Assembly of the Republic of Bashkortostan (2017–present), 2014 and 2019 head candidate * Ildar Shafikov, retired police colonel * Andrey Yegorov, former Member of State Assembly of the Republic of Bashkortostan (2018–2023)	Registered
Ivan Sukharev; Liberal Democratic Party	* Lyaysan Garipova, aide to Ivan Sukharev * Yury Rudakov, Member of State Assembly of the Republic of Bashkortostan (2023–present) * Ruslan Zaynullin, Member of Ufa City Council (2021–present)	Registered
Ilshat Timeryanov; New People	* Andrey Kasyanov, homeowners association chairman * Aleksandr Ponyavin, pump operator, ecological activist * Dmitry Vaysbrot, businessman	Registered

== Finances ==
All sums are in rubles.

Financial Report	Source	Khabirov	Nagorny	Shaynurov	Sukharev	Timeryanov
First		50,000	520,000	5,000	100,000	200,000
Final		60,000,000	1,060,000	3,365,000	1,390,920	32,317,826

== Results ==
Summary of the 6–8 September 2024 Bashkir head election results
Candidate	Party	Votes	%
Radiy Khabirov (incumbent)	United Russia	1,724,962	80.21
Artur Shaynurov	Communist Party	149,492	6.95
Ivan Sukharev	Liberal Democratic Party	107,127	4.98
Vladimir Nagorny	A Just Russia – For Truth	91,585	4.26
Ilshat Timeryanov	New People	55,973	2.60
Valid votes		2,129,139	99.00
Blank ballots		21,507	1.00
Total		2,150,646	100.00
Turnout		2,150,646	72.24
Registered voters		2,977,026	100.00

Head Khabirov re-appointed incumbent Senator Lilia Gumerova (United Russia) to the Federation Council.

== See also ==
- 2024 Russian regional elections
