= Amir Ishemgulov =

Russian biologist and politician (1960–2020)

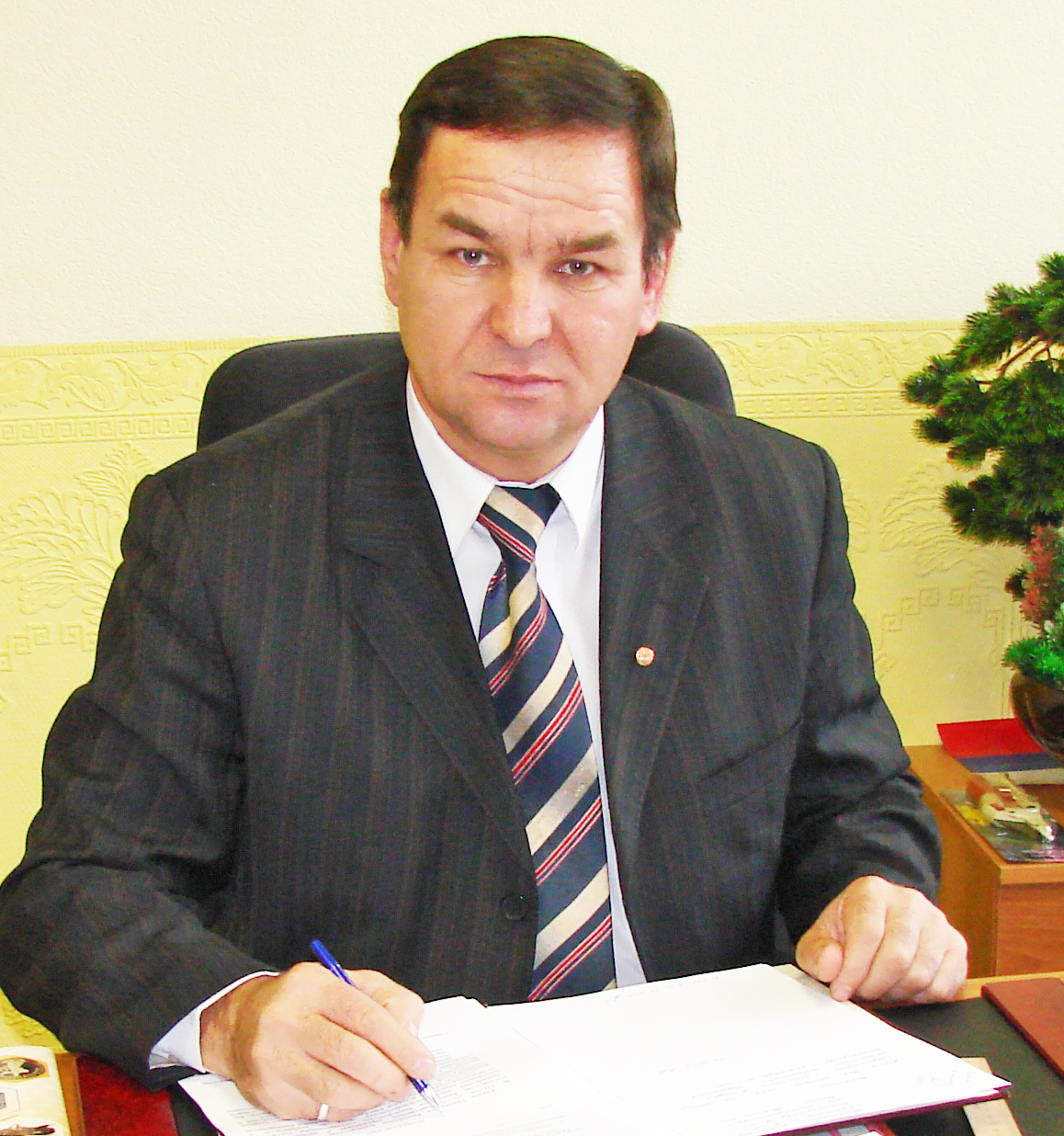
- Born: 22 May 1960; Alimgulovo, Bashkir ASSR, RSFSR
- Died: 29 October 2020 (aged 60); Bashkortostan
- Education: Bashkir State Agrarian University
- Awards: Honored Scientist of the Russian Federation (2008); Order of Salawat Yulayev gold medals of VDNKh
- Scientific career
- Fields: biology, beekeeping, apitherapy
- Workplaces: Bashkir State Research Center for Beekeeping and Apitherapy

Amir Minniakhmetovich Ishemgulov (Russian: Амир Минниахметович Ишемгулов; 22 May 1960 – 29 October 2020) was a Russian biologist and politician of Bashkir ethnicity, Doctor of Biological Sciences, professor.

== Early life and education ==
Ishemgulov was born on 22 May 1960, in Bashkortostan, RSFSR, Soviet Union.

He was a distant relative of the writer Zainab Biisheva. She took part in his upbringing. He was ethnically Bashkir. In 1984, he graduated with honors from the Bashkortostan Institute of Agricultural Sciences.

== Career ==
He was the chairman of the executive committee of the World Qoroltai of the Bashkirs, and Director General of the Research Center for Beekeeping and Apitherapy of The Republic of Bashkortostan. He also is a member of the State Assembly of the Republic of Bashkortostan and a Member of the Petrovskaya Academy of Sciences and Arts.

Since 1998, the Director of the Research Center for Beekeeping and Apitherapy of The Republic of Bashkortostan, he has initiated the creation of the center. In 2005, Ishemgulov defended his doctoral dissertation and earned the degree of Doktor nauk and in 2006 he received the title of Professor. Currently he is a professor in his alma mater, now known as Bashkir State Agrarian University.

In 2012, he was a candidate for Corresponding Member of the Academy of Sciences of the Republic of Bashkortostan.

He was elected to the State Assembly of the Republic of Bashkortostan in 2013, Member of the Party "United Russia".

He was a Honored Man of agriculture of Republic Bashkortostan.

== Later life and death ==
He was married and had a daughter. On 29 October 2020, Ishemgulov died after a long illness at the age of 60.
