= Yunir Kutluguzhin =

- Юнир Ҡотлоғужин
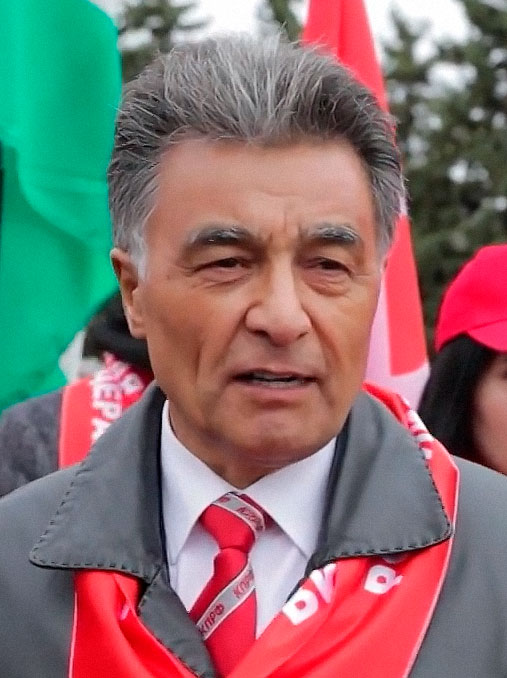
- Kutluguzhin in 2021

Member of the Bashkir State Assembly
- Incumbent
- Assumed office 9 September 2018

First Secretary of the Central Committee of the Communist Party of the Russian Federation in Bashkortostan
- Incumbent
- Assumed office 28 September 2014
- Preceded by: Rifgat Gardanov

Personal details
- Born: 25 April 1958 (age 68) Aralbay, Bashkir ASSR, Russian SFSR, Soviet Union
- Party: CPRF
- Other political affiliations: CPSU (1982–1991)
- Children: 3
- Education: Bashkir State Agrarian University

Yunir Galimyanovich Kutluguzhin (Bashkir: Юнир Галимьянович Ҡотлоғужин, romanized: Yunir Galimyanoviç Qotloğucin, Russian: Юнир Галимьянович Кутлугужин; born 25 April 1958) is a Bashkir politician who has served as a member of the Bashkortostan State Assembly since September 2018 from the Communist Party of the Russian Federation (CPRF).

Since September 2014, he's been serving as the CPRF Bashkir Regional Branch's First Secretary and has been nominee from the party in the 2014 and 2019 head elections.

== Early life and career ==
Born in the village of Aralbay of Kugarchinsky District, Kutluguzhin during summer worked at the Oktyab collective farm where he prepared fodder and cleaned livestock as teen. He studied at the Bashkir State Agrarian University at the Faculty of Veterinary Medicine.

After graduating, he was appointed as a chief veterinarian of the Oktyabr collective farm, on a voluntary basis he was elected as secretary of the Komsomol Committee of the farm and then in April 1983, Kutluguzhin became an instructor of the Agricultural Department of the Kugarchinsky Cistrict Committee of the CPSU, and in November 1984 he was elected secretary of the party committee of the largest farm, the Oktyabrsky state farm. In 1988, Kutluguzhin was elected a deputy of the Kugarchinsky District Council of People's Deputies. During the years of work in the state farm, the economy occupied the first places in production, cultural and sports indicators, the party organization grew.

In 1990, Kutluguzhin graduated from the two-year full-time department of the Sverdlovsk Higher Party School and in March of the same year, he was elected secretary of the Kugarchinsky RK of the CPSU eventually becoming the First Secretary in January 1991. After the ban on the activities of the Communist Party, Kutluguzhin organized the Association of Peasant Farms of the region, worked as director of the state farm Mrakovsky. During this period, he was again elected as a deputy of the Kugarchinsky District Council.

From September 2005, Kutluguzhin worked as a locksmith at ZAO Mostostroitelnoe upravlenie until March 2010, when he became a leading specialist-expert in the protection, control and regulation of the use of objects of the animal world and their habitat under the Bashkir Ministry of Ecology.

== Political career ==
Kutluguzhin became a member of the Central Committee of the Communist Party of the Russian Federation (CPRF) in February 2013 and then in April 2014, he was elected as the party's Second Secretary of the party's branch in Bashkortostan.

On 28 September 2014, shortly after the presidential elections, Kutluguzhin was chosen to be the First Secretary of the CPRF in Bashkortostan at the party's 2nd Plenum.

At the 2018 parliamentary elections, Kutluguzhin was elected as a member of the State Assembly. From there, he was elected as a parliamentary leader of the CPRF at the Assembly's opening session.

== 2014 presidential campaign ==
On 22 June 2014, Kutluguzhin was nominated by the Communist Party of the Russian Federation (CPRF) for presidency in the 2014 presidential election. From there, he campaigned on the issues of agriculture, housing, budgeting, construction, industry and environmental problems. Kutluguzhin called for an end of further privatization of state-owned enterprises and land.

At the snap presidential elections, Kutluguzhin swept 10.1% of the vote, taking second place in race behind Rustem Khamitov. He refused to conceded the race, claiming of electoral fraud and threatened to bring anyone in charge of alleged fraud to justice in future.

== 2019 head campaign ==
Kutluguzhin was again nominated for candidacy as the head of Bashkortostan by the Communist Party of the Russian Federation (CPRF) on 17 April 2019 to challenge incumbent Head Radiy Khabirov. He called for the improvements in the quality of life of the population, ensuring social justice and dynamic economic development of the republic.

Kutluguzhin won 6.9% of the vote, faring worse than in 2014 after losing bid to Khabirov. In response his loss, Kutluguzhin criticised the official results, stating that the Central Election Commission had "initially ignored" constitutional law requirement for candidates to know the Bashkir language and that the results were falsified amid numerous violations at polling stations. He also accused Khabirov of using his official status for self-promotion in the media.
