= Zugura Rakhmatullina =

Russian politician (born 1961)

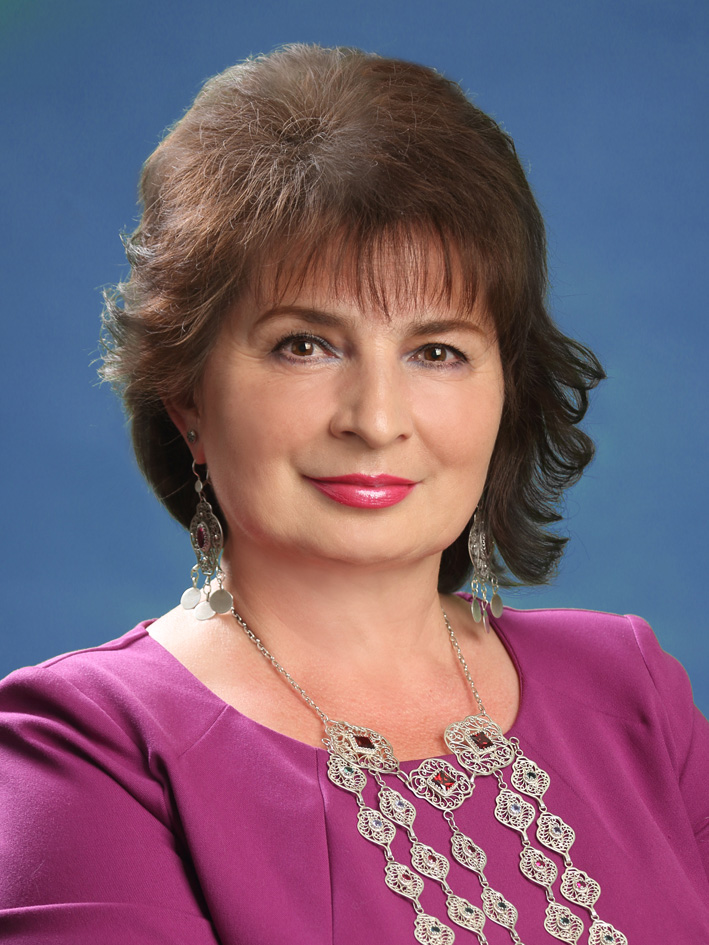

Member of the State Duma for Bashkortostan
- In office 5 October 2016 – 12 October 2021
- Preceded by: constituency established
- Succeeded by: Elvira Aitkulova
- Constituency: Beloretsk (No. 5)

Member of the State Duma (Party List Seat)
- In office 21 December 2011 – 5 October 2016

Personal details
- Born: 26 August 1961 Nizhniye Lemezy, Iglinsky District, Bashkir ASSR, RSFSR, Soviet Union
- Party: United Russia
- Education: Bashkir State University (PhD)
- Occupation: Professor

Zugura Yaganurovna Rakhmatullina (Russian: Зугура Ягануровна Рахматуллина; Bashkir: Зөһрә Йыһанур ҡыҙы Рәхмәтуллина, romanized: Zöhrä Yıhanur qızı Räxmätullina; born 26 August 1961) is a Russian philosopher, stateswoman and politician from the United Russia party.

== Education ==
In 1985 Zugura graduated from Bashkir State University. In 1991 she defended her dissertation for the degree of Candidate of Philosophical Sciences in BSU. In 2000 she defended her doctoral thesis.

== Awards and honours ==
- 2006 – Member of the Russian Academy of Natural Sciences
- 2016 – Medal of the Order "For Merit to the Fatherland", II degree

== Political activities ==
She represented the Beloretsk constituency in the State Duma from 2011 to 2021. She did not seek re-election at the 2021 Russian legislative election.

== See also ==
- List of members of the 7th Russian State Duma who were not re-elected
