= Zarif Baiguskarov =

Russian politician (born 1967)

- Зариф Байгускаров
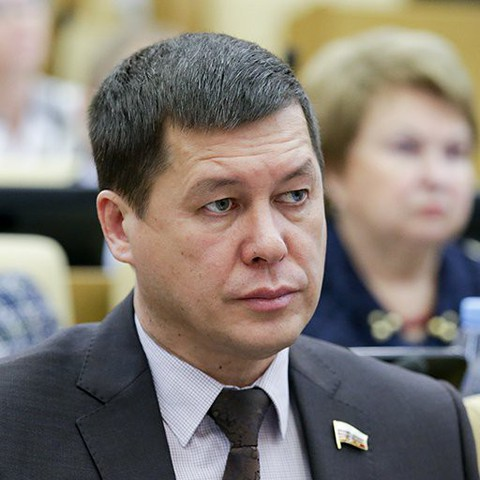
- Baiguskarov in 2016

Member of the State Duma
- Incumbent
- Assumed office 5 October 2016
- Preceded by: constituency re-established
- Constituency: Salavat (No. 7)

Personal details
- Born: 30 June 1967 (age 59) Kadyrovo, Kugarchinsky District, Republic of Bashkortostan, Bashkir Autonomous Soviet Socialist Republic, USSR
- Party: United Russia
- Education: Bashkir State University

Zarif Zakirovich Baiguskarov (Russian: Зари́ф Заки́рович Байгуска́ров; born 30 June 1967) is a Russian politician and law enforcement officer serving as a deputy of State Duma since 2016.

In 1998 he was appointed as a judge of the Ufa District Court. From 2001 to 2004, he was the chief bailiff of the republic.

Since September 2021, he has served as a deputy of the 8th State Duma. He ran with the United Russia to represent Bashkortostan. In the Duma, he was allocated to the Committee on Ecology, Natural Resources and Environmental Protection.

== Awards and titles ==
- 2007 - Honored Lawyer of the Republic of Bashkortostan
- Honorary Employee of the Federal Bailiff Service
- Medal of Anatoly Koni (award of the Ministry of Justice of the Russian Federation)

== Sanctions ==
He was sanctioned by the UK government in 2022 in relation to the Russo-Ukrainian War.

== Criminal Prosecution ==
On March 22, 2023, a Ukrainian court sentenced Baiguskarov in absentia to 15 years in prison with confiscation of property under charges of encroaching on the territorial integrity and inviolability of Ukraine.

== Family ==
Divorced. He has two children: a daughter, Galsar, who is a singer and actress, and a son, Ural.
