= Elvira Aitkulova =

Russian politician (born 1973)

- Эльвира Аиткулова
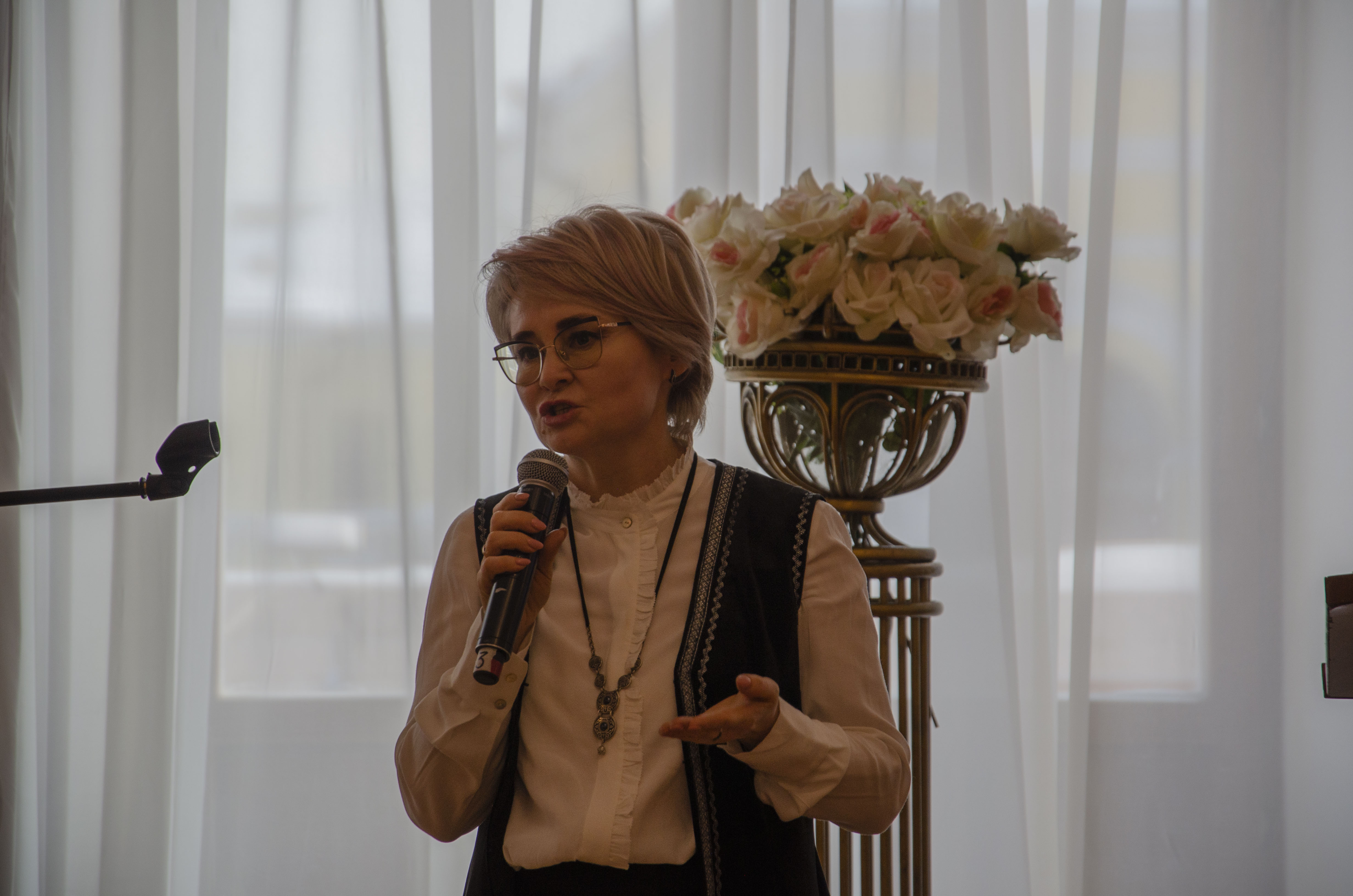
- Elvira Aitkulova at the 15th anniversary of Bashkir Wikipedia

Member of the State Duma
- Incumbent
- Assumed office 12 October 2021
- Preceded by: Zugura Rakhmatullina
- Constituency: Beloretsk (No. 5)

Personal details
- Born: August 19, 1973 (age 53) Novobayramgulovo, Uchalinsky District, Bashkir ASSR, RSFSR, Soviet Union
- Party: United Russia
- Education: Bashkir State University

Elvira Rinatovna Aitkulova (Russian: Эльвира Ринатовна Аиткулова; Bashkir: Айытҡолова Эльвира Ринат ҡыҙы, romanized: Ayıtqolowa Elwira Rinat qıźı, born 19 August 1973) is a Russian journalist and politician from United Russia. She has represented Beloretsk constituency in the State Duma since 2021.

== Education ==
She graduated from Bashkir State University.

== Activity ==
In 1997-2004 she worked as a political observer for the State Television and Radio Broadcasting Company "Bashkortostan", affiliated with VGTRK. In 2010–2013, he was the editor-in-chief of the "Bashkortostan" TV studio.

In 2013, she was elected a deputy of the 5th State Assembly of Bashkortostan, chairman of the committee on education, culture, sports and youth policy. In 2018, she was reelected to the sixth convocation. Member of the United Russia faction. Deputy Chairman of the State Assembly (2018). Aitkulova also was co-chair of the regional headquarters of the All-Russia People's Front.

In 2019 Aitkulova was elected Chairperson of the Presidium of The World Qoroltai of the Bashkirs.

In the 2021 election, she was elected to the 8th State Duma in the Beloretsk single-mandate constituency No. 5 as a representative of the United Russia party. Elvira Aitkulova received 59.23% of the votes cast in the election.

In 2022, she supported the Russian invasion of Ukraine.

=== Sanctions ===
She was sanctioned by the UK government in 2022 in relation to the Russo-Ukrainian War.

== Family ==
Her husband, Ilgiz Azatovich Aitkulov, is deputy director of the TV channel "Vsya Ufa." They have two daughters: Diana Ilgizovna Kremeshnaya and Amilya Ilgizovna Aitkulova, as well as a granddaughter, Sofia Kremeshnaya.

== Honors and awards ==
- Certificate of Honor of the Republic of Bashkortostan
- Certificate of Honor of the State Assembly — Kurultay of the Republic of Bashkortostan, along with a badge of distinction.
