= 2018 Bashkir parliamentary election =

← 2013	9 September 2018	2023 →
- 110 seats in the State Assembly; 56 seats needed for a majority
- Turnout: 48.99%
Party	Leader	Vote %	Seats	+/–
United Russia	Rustem Khamitov	59.21	79	−9
CPRF	Yunir Kutluguzhin	19.09	15	+5
LDPR	Ryabov Vyacheslav	10.11	7	+4
SR	Yuri Ignatiev	5.56	5	+5
Patriots of Russia	Zagir Khakimov	4.01	2	+1
The Greens	Rufina Shagapova	2.01	1	+1
Independents	–	–	1	−5
This lists parties that won seats. See the complete results below.
Results by Administrative divisions (left) and single-member districts (right)
Chairman before	Chairman after
Konstantin Tolkachev; United Russia	Konstantin Tolkachev; United Russia

Parliamentary elections were held in Bashkortostan on 9 September 2018 to elect the 110 members of 6th convocation of the State Assembly. The United Russia won majority of seats while the Communist Party and Liberal Democratic Party earned the highest gain of seats.

== Electoral system ==
In accordance with the Bashkir law, the State Assembly of Bashkortostan members are elected for a five-year term on the basis of universal equal and direct suffrage through a secret ballot by a citizen of the Russian Federation. A person may be eligible to be elected if they have reached the age of 21 as well as the right to vote. The State Assembly can function if at least 2/3's of its members have been elected.

== Timeline ==
- 18 June 2018 – The Central Election Commission of Bashkortostan sets the election date for 9 September.
- 10 July 2018 – Accreditation of mass media applications begin.
- 21 July 2018 – Nominations of candidates end and registration begins.
- 31 July 2018 – Registration of candidates end.
- 5 September 2018 – Accreditation of media applications end.
- 8 September 2018 – Day of silence, campaigning is prohibited.
- 9 September 2018 – Election day, 3,426 polls open at 8:00 and close at 20:00 where the tabulation and counting of ballots begin.

== Results ==
Party	Party-list			Constituency			Total seats	+/–
Party	Votes	%	Seats	Votes	%	Seats	Total seats	+/–
United Russia	871,888	59.21	35			44	79	–9
Communist Party of the Russian Federation	281,110	19.09	11			4	15	+5
Liberal Democratic Party of Russia	148,879	10.11	6			1	7	+4
A Just Russia	81,861	5.56	3			2	5	+5
Patriots of Russia	59,075	4.01	0			2	2	+1
Russian Ecological Party "The Greens"	29,627	2.01	0			1	1	+1
Independents						1	1	–5
Total	1,472,440	100.00	55			55	110	0
Valid votes	1,472,440	98.47						
Invalid/blank votes	22,909	1.53						
Total votes	1,495,349	100.00						
Registered voters/turnout	3,052,214	48.99		3,052,214	–			
Source: Central Election Commission
