= 2019 Bashkir head election =

Election in Bashkir, Russia during 2019

← 2014	8 September 2019	2024 →
- Turnout: 71.74%
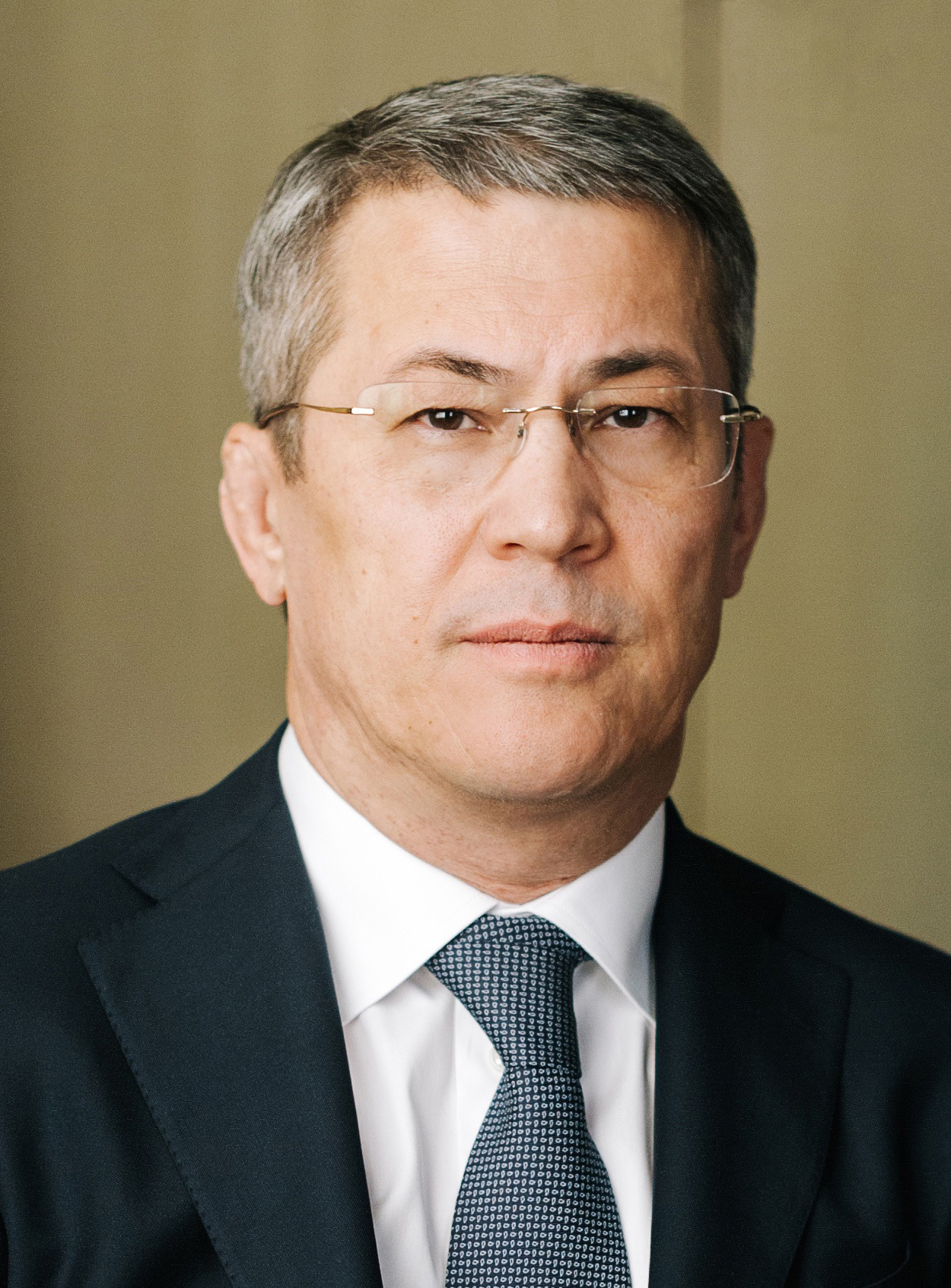

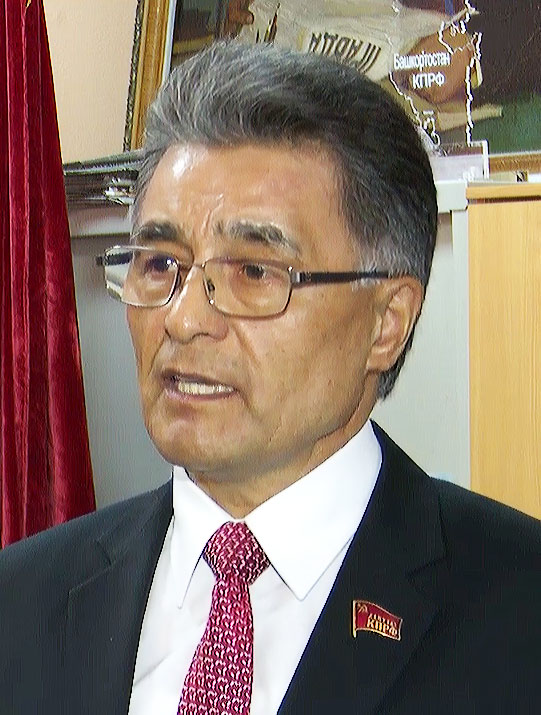
Nominee	Radiy Khabirov	Yunir Kutluguzhin
Party	United Russia	CPRF
Popular vote	1,794,176	150,692
Percentage	82.78%	6.95%
- Results by district
Acting Head before election
Radiy Khabirov
United Russia
Elected Head
Radiy Khabirov
United Russia

The 2019 Bashkir head election was held on 8 September 2019 in the autonomous republic of Bashkortostan. The result was a victory for Radiy Khabirov who won 82.02% of the vote.

== Background ==
Since July 2010, Bashkortostan was headed by President Rustem Khamitov. First, he was appointed as an acting president by Dmitry Medvedev after the early resignation of Bashkir President Murtaza Rakhimov, and a few days later, on 19 July 2010, Khamitov was confirmed as the new president of the republic for a 5 year term through the procedure of approval by the deputies of the State Assembly.

In early May 2012, Russian president Dmitry Medvedev signed a law returning direct elections for heads of regions to Russia. The law came into force on 1 June 2012.

On 27 February 2014, amendments were made to the Constitution of the Republic of Bashkortostan, according to which, from 1 January 2015, the post of the president was changed to the head of the republic.

In early 2014, Khamitov sought for re-election for presidency. On 30 May 2014, he resigned ahead of schedule and was immediately appointed by Russian president Vladimir Putin as the acting president of Bashkortostan and also received permission to participate in the elections. Snap presidential elections were held on 14 September 2014. From there, Khamitov won 81.8% of the vote with a turnout of 74.9%. He was elected for a 5 year term which was set to expire in September 2019.

On 11 October 2018, at the Day of the Republic of Bashkortostan, Khamitov resigned ahead of the elections, citing as a "personal decision" noting that he wouldn't run for re-election. The acting head of the republic was appointed 54 year old Radiy Khabirov, whom prior to that, was the head of the Krasnogorsk City District in Moscow Oblast.

== Results ==
Candidate	Party	Votes	%
Radiy Khabirov	United Russia	1,794,176	82.78
Yunir Kutluguzhin	Communist Party	150,692	6.95
Ivan Sukharev	Liberal Democratic Party	99,173	4.58
Zulfiya Gaysina	Yabloko	33,394	1.54
Yuri Ignatiev	A Just Russia	26,938	1.24
Rafis Kadyrov	Patriots of Russia	24,034	1.11
Vladimir Barabash	Civilian Power	21,193	0.98
Vladimir Kobzev	Russian Party of Pensioners for Social Justice	17,688	0.82
Total		2,167,288	100.00
Valid votes		2,167,288	99.08
Invalid/blank votes		20,197	0.92
Total votes		2,187,485	100.00
Registered voters/turnout		3,049,196	71.74
Source: CIKRB
