= Irshat Fakhritdinov =

Russian politician (1965–2021)

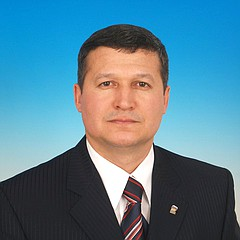
- Fakhritdinov in March 2020

Member of the State Duma
- In office 24 December 2007 – 5 October 2016

Personal details
- Born: 1 February 1965 Sayranovo, Bashkir ASSR, Russian SFSR, Soviet Union
- Died: 22 October 2021 (aged 56) Ufa, Russia
- Party: United Russia

Irshat Yunirovich Fakhritdinov (Russian: Иршат Юнирович Фахритдинов; 1 February 1965 – 22 October 2021) was a Russian politician.

== Life ==
A member of the United Russia party, he served in the State Duma from 2007 to 2016.

Fakhritdinov died from COVID-19 on 22 October 2021, during the COVID-19 pandemic in Russia. He was 56 years old.
