= Bashkir Scientific Research Center for Beekeeping and Apitherapy =

Russian research institute

Bashkir Scientific Research Center for Beekeeping and Apitherapy (Russian: Башкирский научно-исследовательский центр (БНИЦ) по пчеловодству и апитерапии) is a Bashkirian State premier research institute based in Ufa, Republic of Bashkortostan, Russia, specialized in beekeeping and apitherapy. The institute was established by Amir Ishemgulov in 1998. 200 species of medical and preventive, nutrition products and cosmetics supply is produced in the Center, and exported to other countries.

The Center produces Bashkirian honey. and is the sole holder of the "Bashkir honey" license.

Since 2005 the Center has exported honey to the USA and Western Europe. The Center also exports honey to Asia.
