= Sayranovo =

Sayranovo Сайраново
- Selo
- Location within Bashkortostan Location within Russia
- Coordinates: 53°26′N 56°23′E
- Country: Russia
- Region: Bashkortostan
- District: Ishimbaysky District
- Time zone: UTC+5:00

Sayranovo (Russian: Сайраново; Bashkir: Һайран, Hayran) is a rural locality (a selo) in Sayranovsky Selsoviet, Ishimbaysky District, Bashkortostan, Russia. The population was 339 as of 2010. There are 4 streets.

== Geography ==
Sayranovo is located 34 km east of Ishimbay (the district's administrative centre) by road. Arlarovo is the nearest rural locality.

== Notable people ==
- Irshat Fakhritdinov was born in Sayranovo
- Radiy Khabirov was born in Sayranovo
