= Alimgulovo =

Alimgulovo Алимгулово
- Village
- Location within Bashkortostan Location within Russia
- Coordinates: 52°45′N 56°12′E
- Country: Russia
- Region: Bashkortostan
- District: Kugarchinsky District
- Time zone: UTC+5:00

Alimgulovo (Russian: Алимгулово; Bashkir: Әлимғол, Älimğol) is a rural locality (a village) in Volostnovsky Selsoviet, Kugarchinsky District, Bashkortostan, Russia. The population was 103 as of 2010. There are 2 streets.

== Geography ==
Alimgulovo is located 35 km west of Mrakovo (the district's administrative centre) by road. Tyulyabayevo is the nearest rural locality.
