= Kadyrovo, Kugarchinsky District, Republic of Bashkortostan =

Kadyrovo Кадырово
- Village
- Location within Bashkortostan Location within Russia
- Coordinates: 52°44′N 56°15′E
- Country: Russia
- Region: Bashkortostan
- District: Kugarchinsky District
- Time zone: UTC+5:00

Kadyrovo (Russian: Кадырово; Bashkir: Ҡаҙир, Qaźir) is a rural locality (a village) in Volostnovsky Selsoviet, Kugarchinsky District, Bashkortostan, Russia. The population was 127 as of 2010. There are 2 streets.

== Geography ==
Kadyrovo is located 34 km northwest of Mrakovo (the district's administrative centre) by road. Tyulyabayevo is the nearest rural locality.
