= Nizhniye Lemezy =

Nizhniye Lemezy Нижние Лемезы
- Selo
- Location within Bashkortostan Location within Russia
- Coordinates: 54°45′N 56°59′E
- Country: Russia
- Region: Bashkortostan
- District: Iglinsky District
- Time zone: UTC+5:00

Nizhniye Lemezy (Russian: Нижние Лемезы; Bashkir: Түбәнге Ләмәҙ, Tübänge Lämäź) is a rural locality (a selo) and the administrative centre of Lemezinsky Selsoviet, Iglinsky District, Bashkortostan, Russia. The population was 707 as of 2010. There are 10 streets.

== Geography ==
Nizhniye Lemezy is located 62 km southeast of Iglino (the district's administrative centre) by road. Ulu-Yelan is the nearest rural locality.
