= Aralbay =

Aralbay Аралбай
- Village
- Location within Bashkortostan Location within Russia
- Coordinates: 52°49′N 56°28′E
- Country: Russia
- Region: Bashkortostan
- District: Kugarchinsky District
- Time zone: UTC+5:00

Aralbay (Bashkir and Russian: Аралбай) is a rural locality (a village) in Zarechensky Selsoviet, Kugarchinsky District, Bashkortostan, Russia. The population was 109 as of 2010. There are 2 streets.

== Geography ==
Aralbay is located 24 km northwest of Mrakovo (the district's administrative centre) by road. Voskresenskoye is the nearest rural locality.
