= Russky Yurmash =

Russky Yurmash Русский Юрмаш
- Selo
- Location within Bashkortostan Location within Russia
- Coordinates: 54°42′N 56°14′E
- Country: Russia
- Region: Bashkortostan
- District: Ufimsky District
- Time zone: UTC+5:00

Russky Yurmash (Russian: Русский Юрмаш; Bashkir: Урыҫ-Юрмаш, Urıś-Yurmaş) is a rural locality (a selo) and the administrative centre of Russko-Yurmashsky Selsoviet, Ufimsky District, Bashkortostan, Russia. The population was 1,198 as of 2010. There are 22 streets.

== Geography ==
Russky Yurmash is located 27 km east of Ufa (the district's administrative centre) by road. Yurmash is the nearest rural locality.
