= Novobayramgulovo =

Novobayramgulovo Новобайрамгулово
- Village
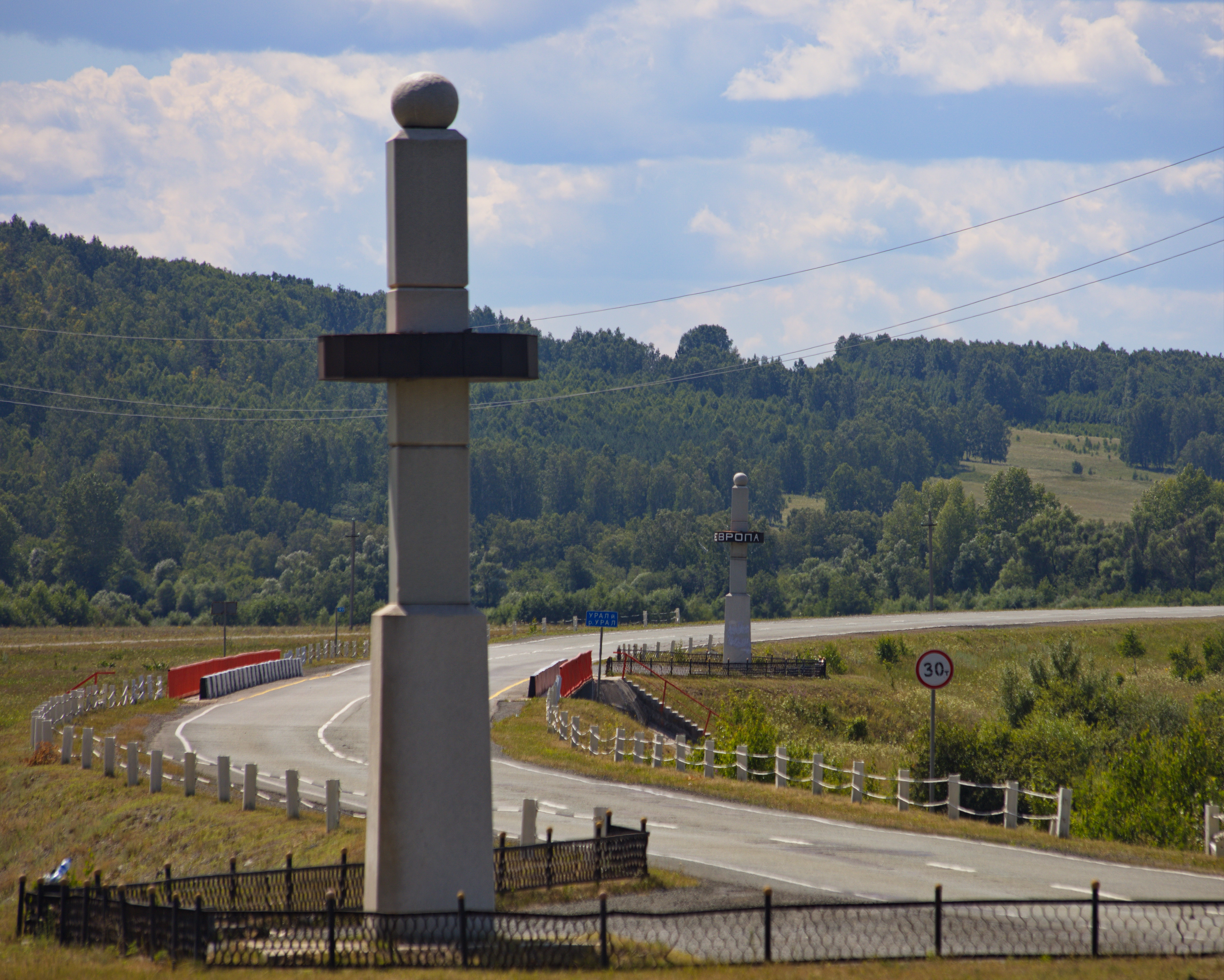
- Monuments on the Europe-Asia border near Novobayramgulovo

- Location within Bashkortostan Location within Russia
- Coordinates: 54°05′N 59°02′E
- Country: Russia
- Region: Bashkortostan
- District: Uchalinsky District
- Time zone: UTC+5:00
- Postal code: 453743

Novobayramgulovo (Russian: Новобайрамгулово; Bashkir: Яңы Байрамғол, Yañı Bayramğol) is a rural locality (a village) and the administrative centre of Novobayramgulovsky Selsoviet, Uchalinsky District, Bashkortostan, Russia. The population was 444 as of 2010. There are 10 streets.

== Geography ==
Novobayramgulovo is located 47 km southwest of Uchaly (the district's administrative centre) by road. Kaipkulovo is the nearest rural locality.
