= Kirillovo, Republic of Bashkortostan =

Kirillovo Кириллово
- Village
- Location within Bashkortostan Location within Russia
- Coordinates: 54°48′N 56°18′E
- Country: Russia
- Region: Bashkortostan
- District: Ufimsky District
- Time zone: UTC+5:00

Kirillovo (Russian: Кириллово) is a rural locality (a village) and the administrative centre of Kirillovsky Selsoviet, Ufimsky District, Bashkortostan, Russia. The population was 773 as of 2010. There are 11 streets.

== Geography ==
Kirillovo is located 29 km northeast of Ufa (the district's administrative centre) by road. Taush is the nearest rural locality.
