= 2014 Bashkir presidential election =

- 14 September 2014
- Turnout: 74.85%
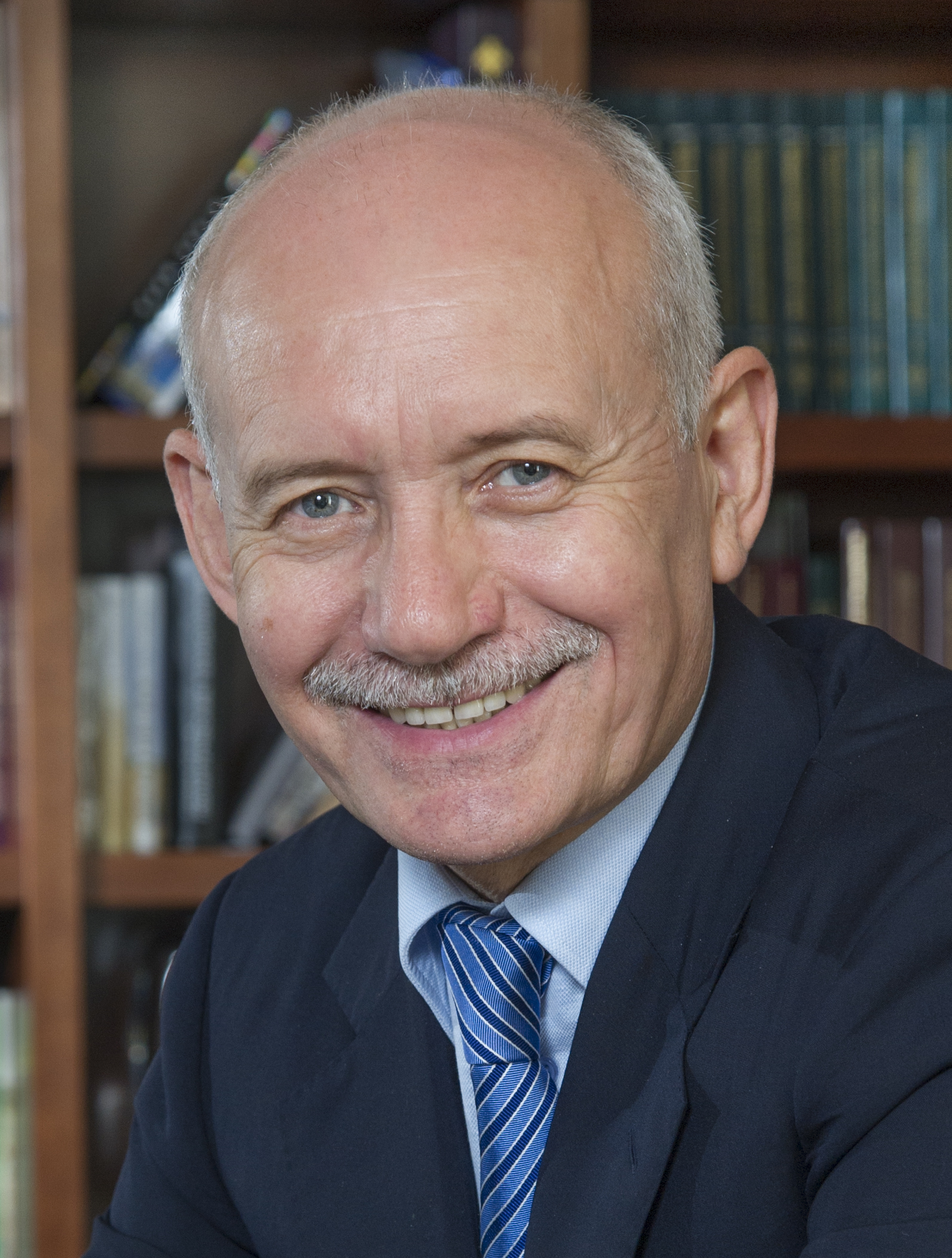

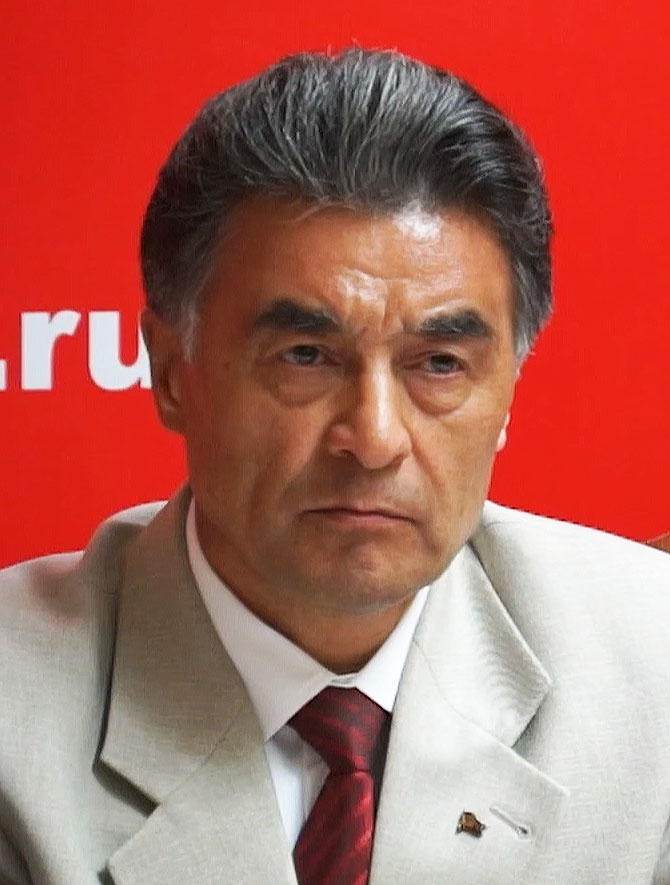
Nominee	Rustem Khamitov	Yunir Kutluguzhin
Party	United Russia	CPRF
Popular vote	1,851,625	229,452
Percentage	82.31%	10.20%
President before election
Rustem Khamitov
United Russia
Elected President
Rustem Khamitov
United Russia

Snap presidential elections were held on 14 September 2014 in the autonomous republic of Bashkortostan to elect the President of the Republic of Bashkortostan. For the first time after an 11-year hiatus, the highest official of the republic was elected by popular vote.

In total, 4 candidates for the post of President of Bashkortostan were registered: Rustem Khamitov (United Russia), Yunir Kutluguzhin (Communist), Ivan Sukharev (Liberal Democrat) and Ildar Bikbaev (Patriots of Russia). The victory was won by the candidate from the incumbent President Khamitov, who collected more than 80% of the vote.

== Background ==
On 15 July 2010, Russian President Dmitry Medvedev accepted the resignation of Bashkortostan President Murtaza Rakhimov from the post with the wording “of his own free will." From there, Medvedev appointed the head of the Federal Agency for Water Resources Rustem Khamitov as the acting president of Bashkortostan until he was confirmed by the State Assembly to the post on 19 July 2010. Khamitov's term of office was set to be expired in 2015.

In 2012, amendments were made to the federal laws "On general principles of organization of legislative (representative) and executive bodies of state power of the constituent entities of the Russian Federation" and "On basic guarantees of electoral rights and the right to participate in a referendum of citizens of the Russian Federation", which returned the election of the highest official persons in all constituent entities in Russia.

The public coalition For a Prosperous Bashkortostan in October 2012 called for Khamitov to initiate snap elections. At the same time, the Bashkir public organization "People's Referendum" appealed to the residents of Bashkortostan with an initiative to hold a popular referendum on the need for early presidential elections, due to the fact that the current president of the republic was appointed according to the "old scheme" (through the appointment of the President of the Russian Federation and approval of the subject in Parliament).

In 2013, various media outlets reported that the snap presidential elections in Bashkortostan could be held simultaneously with the elections of deputies to the State Assembly, which then took place on 8 September 2013.

On 30 May 2014, Russian President Vladimir Putin accepted Khamitov's resignation in order to take part in the presidential election, which was set to take place on 14 September 2014 on a single voting day. According to some analysts, the reason for the snap elections was due to the 7th BRICS summit which was set to take place in the capital of Ufa the following year.

On 18 June 2014, the State Assembly supported the resolution on early elections of the President and thus the start of the election campaign was launched. According to Bashkortostan law, the MP's must make a decision on the appointment of elections no earlier than 100 days, and no later than 90 days before voting day. But since the elections are early, then according to Paragraph 6 in the Article 10 of the Election Code of the Republic of Bashkortostan, the timing of the appointment of elections can be reduced, but not more than by one third. Elections for the President of Bashkortostan are held on the basis of a majoritarian system of absolute majority in a single electoral district, which includes the territory of Bashkortostan.

== Candidates ==
Candidates for the office of President of the Republic of Bashkortostan are nominated by political parties. The nominee must submit the necessary documents to the Central Election Commission of the Republic of Bashkortostan no later than 20 days from the date of the official publication of the decision on the appointment of elections. The nomination of presidential candidates in Bashkortostan will last until 9 July 2014, and the submission of documents for registration until 19 July.

=== Selection process ===
==== United Russia ====
Radiy Khabirov was initially considered as a likely rival for Rustem Khamitov in the Bashkortostan United Russia presidential primaries, whose candidacy could suit both the federal authorities and the republican political elite in the person of the former President Murtaza Rakhimov.

On 11 June 2014 in Ufa, the party delegates identified three candidates for the subsequent nomination for the presidency by the United Russia. Acting president Khamitov received 129 votes, State Duma deputy Rafael Mardanshin 41 votes, President of the Bar Chamber Bashkortostan Bulat Yumadilov 39 votes.

On 21 June 2014, at a conference of the regional branch of United Russia, Khamitov was approved as a candidate from the party with 209 delegate vote while three votes were for Rafael Mardanshin, and two participants for Bulat Yumadilov.

===== Nominee =====
United Russia
Rustem Khamitov

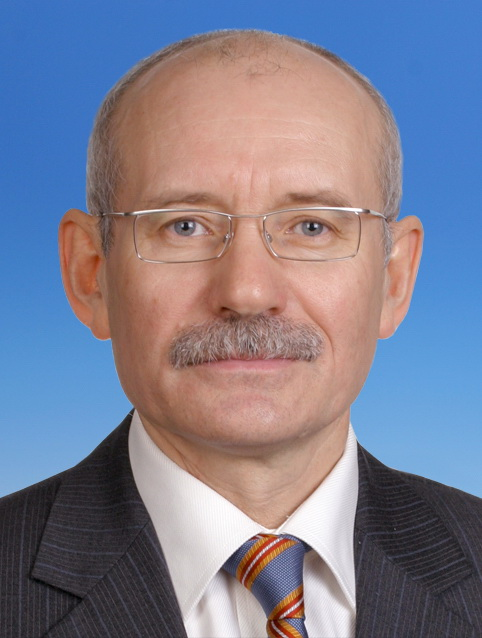

President of Bashkortostan
(2010–2018)
Head of the Federal Agency for
Water Resources
(2004–2009)

===== Failed nominees =====
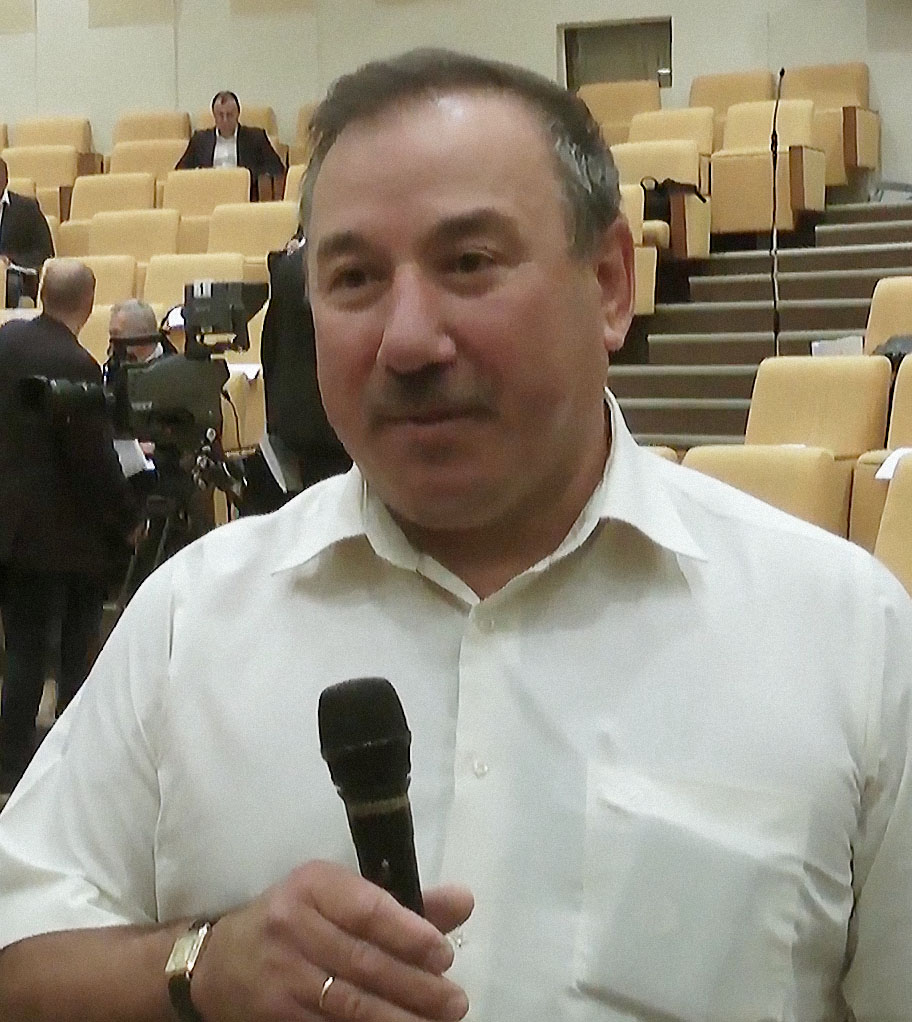
Bulat Yumadilov, President of the Bar Chamber Bashkortostan

==== Civic Platform ====
Former Prime Minister of Bashkortostan Rail Sarbaev was nominated by the Civic Platform on 25 June 2014. In order to be nominated, Sarbaev was obliged to disavow his United Russia membership while the A Just Russia was unable support him. According to political scientists, Sarbaev was the only one of ten candidates who could be a well competitor with Khamitov. Most experts believed that the former president Rakhimov would endorse Sarbaev. According to political scientist Konstantin Kalachev, Sarbaev had good chances of success, and the election would become more interesting and more democratic, telling that “the inhabitants of Bashkiria have missed competitive elections, and the nomination of a candidate of such caliber and with such powerful support radically changes the situation.”

On 9 July 2014, the day when the procedure for nominating candidates from parties for presidency was set to end, Sarbaev was removed at the party congress in the Moscow Oblast by the Civic Platform that nominated him with the saying “in connection with the commission of acts that contradict the interests of the party and inflict her damage.” The head of the Republican Branch of the Civic Platform Aleksey Skrynditsa, claimed that Sarbaev had not known about the decision of the congress and did not participate in it. According to experts, after Sarbayev's nomination, dubious political strategists began to work actively in the region, and custom-made publications appeared in the federal media. Chairman of the Central Election Commission of Bashkortostan Khaidar Valeev support decision in Sarbaev's removal from the race. According to the Sarbaev, he had already managed to garner 454 signatures (out of the required 457) of municipal deputies for registration. The Democratic Party of Russia Chairman Andrei Bogdanov, explained this decision of his former party members by their unwillingness to quarrel with the local authorities. Irina Tverdova, Sarbaev's legal commissioner, said that if sufficient evidence was collected, Sarbaev's headquarters intended to sue the Civic Platform and through it recognize the party's decision as illegal. On 16 July, Sarbaev filed a lawsuit against Civic Platform with the Presnensky Court of Moscow and the Supreme Court of Bashkortostan.

==== Communist Party ====
On 23 June 2014, the participants of the conference of the Bashkir Republican Branch of the Communist Party of the Russian Federation (CPRF) by open vote, out of four proposed candidates, voted for two contenders of whom were Second Secretary of the Bashkir Republican Branch of the Communist Party of the Russian Federation Yunir Kutluguzhin and First Secretary of the Iglinsky District Committee of the CPRF Khasan Idiatullin. After that, secret voting took place, during which Kutluguzhin was chosen to be nominee from the CPRF, after receiving 57 delegates.

===== Nominee =====
Communist Party
Yunir Kutluguzhin

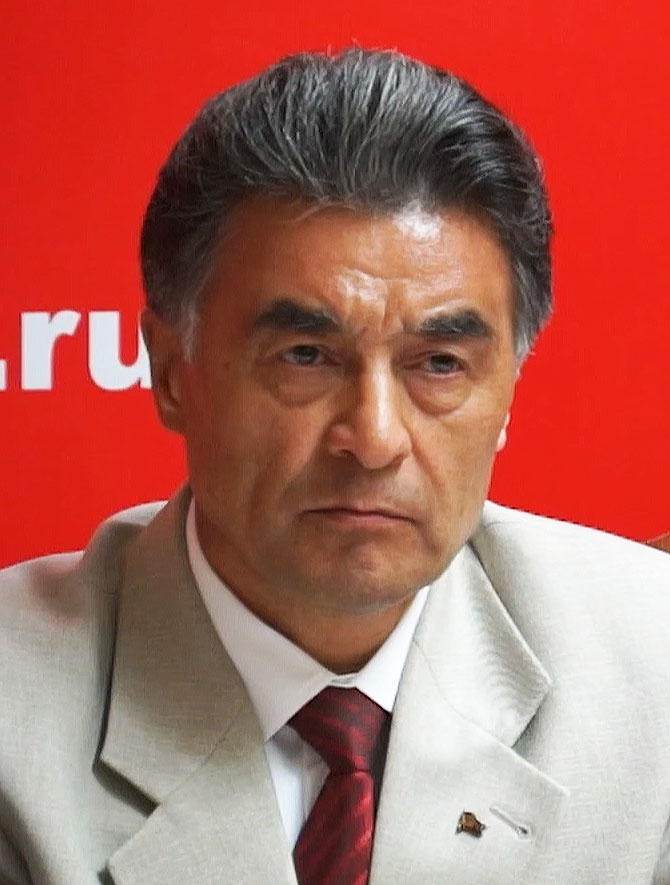

Second Secretary of the CPRF
in Bashkortostan
(2014)
Central Control and Auditing
Commission of the CPRF
(2013–2014)
Leading Expert on Wildlife
Protection of the
Bashkir Ministry of Nature Management and Ecology
(2010–2014)
Director of the Mrakovsky State
Farm and Akbuzat LLC
(1994–2005)
Chairman of the Regional
Association of Peasant Farms
(1991–1994)

===== Failed nominees =====
- Khasan Idiatullin – First Secretary of the Iglinsky District Committee of the CPRF.

==== Patriots of Russia ====
The Bashkortostan Regional Branch of the Patriots of Russia nominated head of the staff of the Public Chamber of Bashkiria Ildar Bikbaev on 22 June 2014 as a presidential candidate.

On 18 July 2014, Bikbaev was the first nominee to pass the municipal filter and submitted to the CEC of Bashkortostan with the signatures of 479 deputies in his support.

===== Nominee =====
Patriots of Russia
Ildar Bikbaev

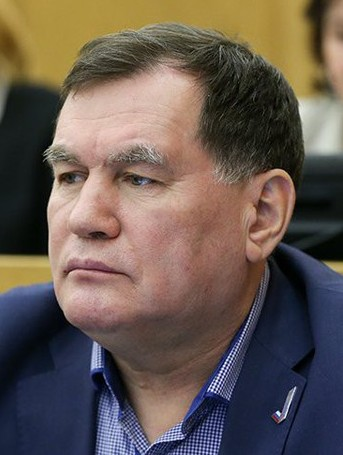

Member and head of the Public
Chamber of the Republic of Bashkortostan
(2009–2016)
Senior lecturer at Bashkir State University
(1985–1986)

== Results ==
Candidate	Party	Votes	%
Rustem Khamitov	United Russia	1,851,625	82.31
Yunir Kutluguzhin	Communist Party	229,452	10.20
Ivan Sukharev	Liberal Democratic Party	109,040	4.85
Ildar Bikbaev	Patriots of Russia	59,475	2.64
Total		2,249,592	100.00
Valid votes		2,249,592	99.27
Invalid/blank votes		16,433	0.73
Total votes		2,266,025	100.00
Registered voters/turnout		3,027,300	74.85
Source: CIKRB
