= Bashkir State Agrarian University =

Agricultural school in Ufa, Russia

- Russian: Башкирский государственный аграрный университет Bashkir: Башҡорт дәүләт аграр университеты, romanized: Başqort dəwlət agrar universitetı
- Type: Agricultural
- Established: 1930
- Rector: Gabitov Ildar Ismagilovitch
- Location: Ufa, Bashkortostan, Russia; 54°44′17″N 55°59′01″E
- Website: www.bsau.ru
- Building details
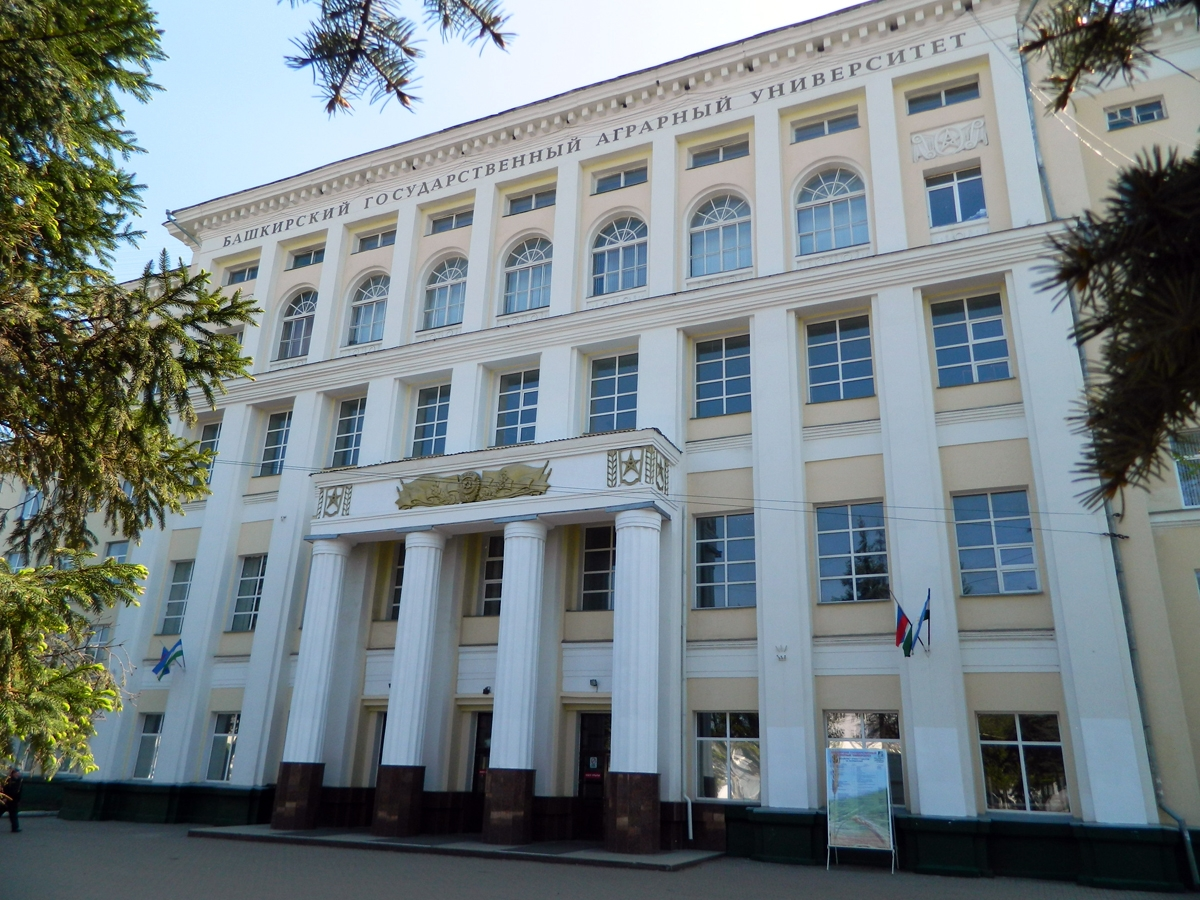

Bashkir State Agrarian University, BSAU (Russian: Башкирский государственный аграрный университет, Bashkir: Башҡорт дәүләт аграр университеты, БДАУ, romanized: Başqort dəwlət agrar universitetı, BDAU) – one of the oldest agricultural higher education institutions of Russia and a centre of education and research in the Bashkortostan Republic.

== History ==
- 1930 – Bashkir Agricultural Institute (БСХИ) is founded according to the Resolution of the Central Executive Committee and Council of People's Commissars of the Soviet Union No. 237 of July 23, 1930 “On reorganizing higher education institutions, colleges and worker’s faculties”. The Institute was housed in the building of the former Ufa seminary. In 1941 Bashkir Agricultural Institute went under the control of the People's Commissariat of Agriculture of the Soviet Union and had the address: Ufa, Karl Marx St., 3.
- 1980 – awarded an Order of the Red Banner of Labour for training highly skilled experts for agriculture and science development.
- 1993 – Bashkir Agricultural Institute got the status of university by Order of the Ministry of Science, Higher School and Engineering policy of the Russian Federation No. 23 of February 15, 1993.
- 2011 – Bashkir Institute of refresher courses and advanced professional training of personnel for agriculture (now Institute of further vocational education) was incorporated to the University.

== University units ==
The University comprises eight departments, Institute of innovative development, Institute of further vocational education, an academic and methodological office, a research and education center, a scientific training center, an educational work management, an information support office and other structural divisions. Training at University is performed by 30 departments on multistage system – Bachelor's degree, specialist, Master's degree, postgraduate studies programs.

The basic University Infrastructure include 7 academic buildings with a total area of more than 145 thousand sq.m, where classroom and laboratory area constitutes 93,8 thousand sq.m, there are 8 hostels with a total area of 45,5 thousand sq.m. All premises are federal property. There are 288 classrooms for 10040 seats, including 29 lecture halls, 108 classrooms for seminars and practicals, 123 laboratories and preparation rooms.

== Science. Research schools and fields ==
Academic staff is trained at postgraduate and doctoral programs under license No. 1834 series AAA of September 1, 2012 (there are 26 certified post-graduate programs as well as 5 doctoral degree programs) on sciences demanded in agriculture. There are dissertation boards on 10 specialities of agricultural, biological, veterinary and engineering sciences. There are 15 research schools and 7 research fields. Scientific researches are carried out in 8 fields of science (according to the list of scientific specialties approved by the Decree of Education and Science Ministry No. 59 of 25.02.2009, as amended by the Education and Science Ministry No. 5 of 10.01.2012) in the framework of the state scientific and engineering programs of the Science Academy of Bashkortostan Republic by grants of the Russian Foundations for basic research, humanities, small enterprise assistance in the scientific and engineering sphere, orders of farm enterprises, the Ministry of Agriculture of Bashkortostan Republic and other ministries.

== Rectors ==
From 2008 – Gabitov Ildar Ismagilovich
