= Radiy Khabirov =

Bashkir politician (born 1964)

- Радий Хəбиров
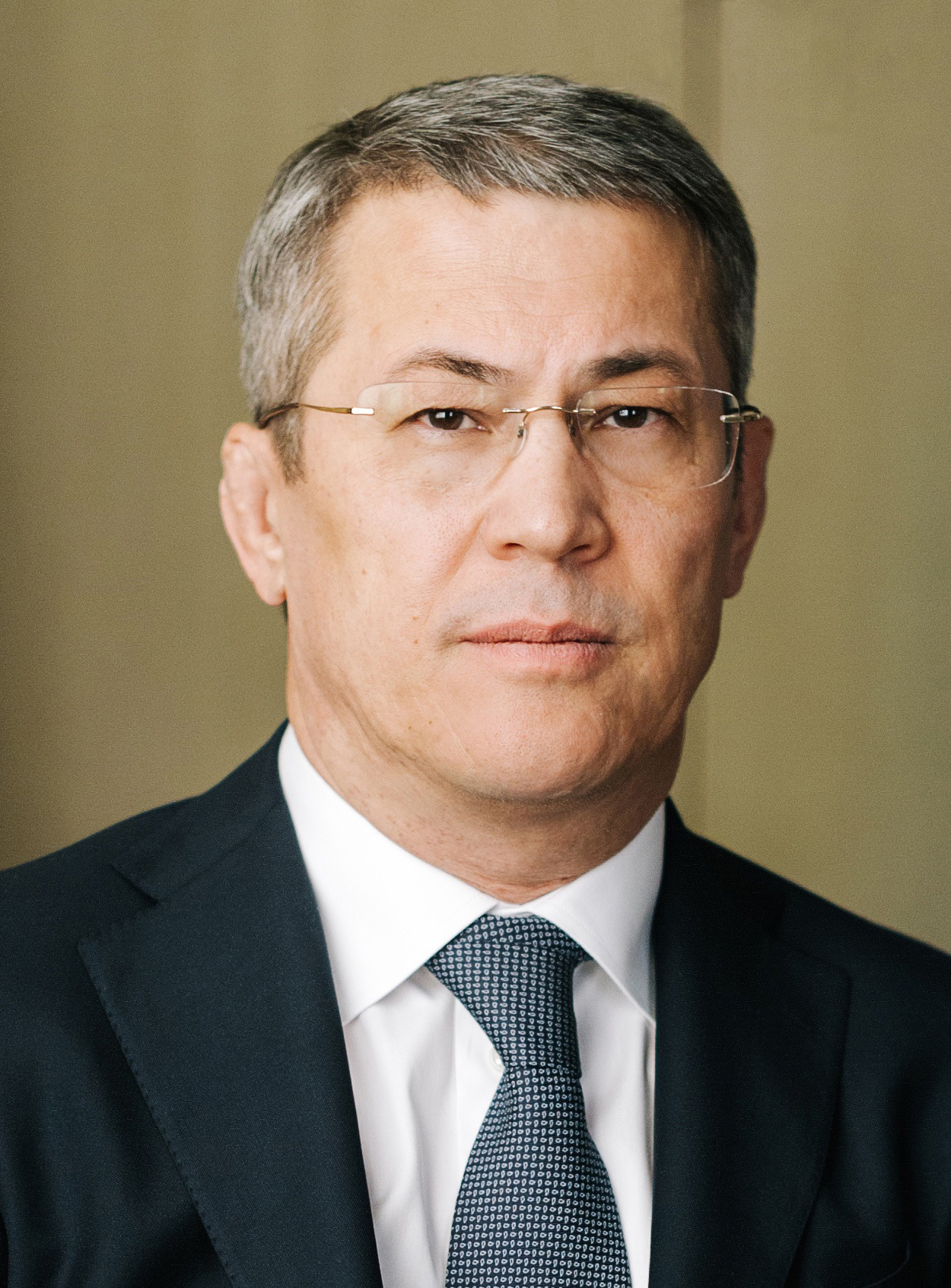
- Official portrait, 2018

Head of the Republic of Bashkortostan
- Incumbent
- Assumed office 11 October 2018; Acting: 11 October 2018 – 19 September 2019
- Prime Minister: Rustem Mardanov; Andrey Nazarov
- Preceded by: Rustem Khamitov

Head of urban district Krasnogorsk
- In office 28 March 2017 – 11 October 2018

4th Deputy Head of Department of President of the Russian Federation on domestic policy
- In office 23 September 2009 – 19 September 2016
- Preceded by: Ildar Raisovich Gimaev

5th Head of the Presidential Administration of the Republic of Bashkortostan
- In office 14 September 2003 – 5 July 2008
- Succeeded by: Azamat Talgatovich Sagitov

Personal details
- Born: 20 March 1964 (age 62) Sayranovo, Bashkir ASSR, Russian SFSR, Soviet Union
- Party: United Russia
- Spouse: Karine Khabirova
- Children: 4 (2 with first wife)
- Parent(s): Farit Khabirov; Razia Khabirova
- Education: Bashkir State University (1989); Bilkent University (1994)
- Awards: Order of Alexander Nevsky; Order of Honour
- Website: Official website

Radiy Faritovich Khabirov (Bashkir: Радий Фəрит улы Хəбиров, romanized: Radiy Färit ulı Xäbirov; Russian: Радий Фаритович Хабиров; born 20 March 1964) is a Russian politician and statesman. He is the current Head of the Republic of Bashkortostan since 11 October 2018; he is also the Candidate of Sciences in Law and Honored Lawyer of the Republic of Bashkortostan. He is a member of United Russia.

== Biography ==
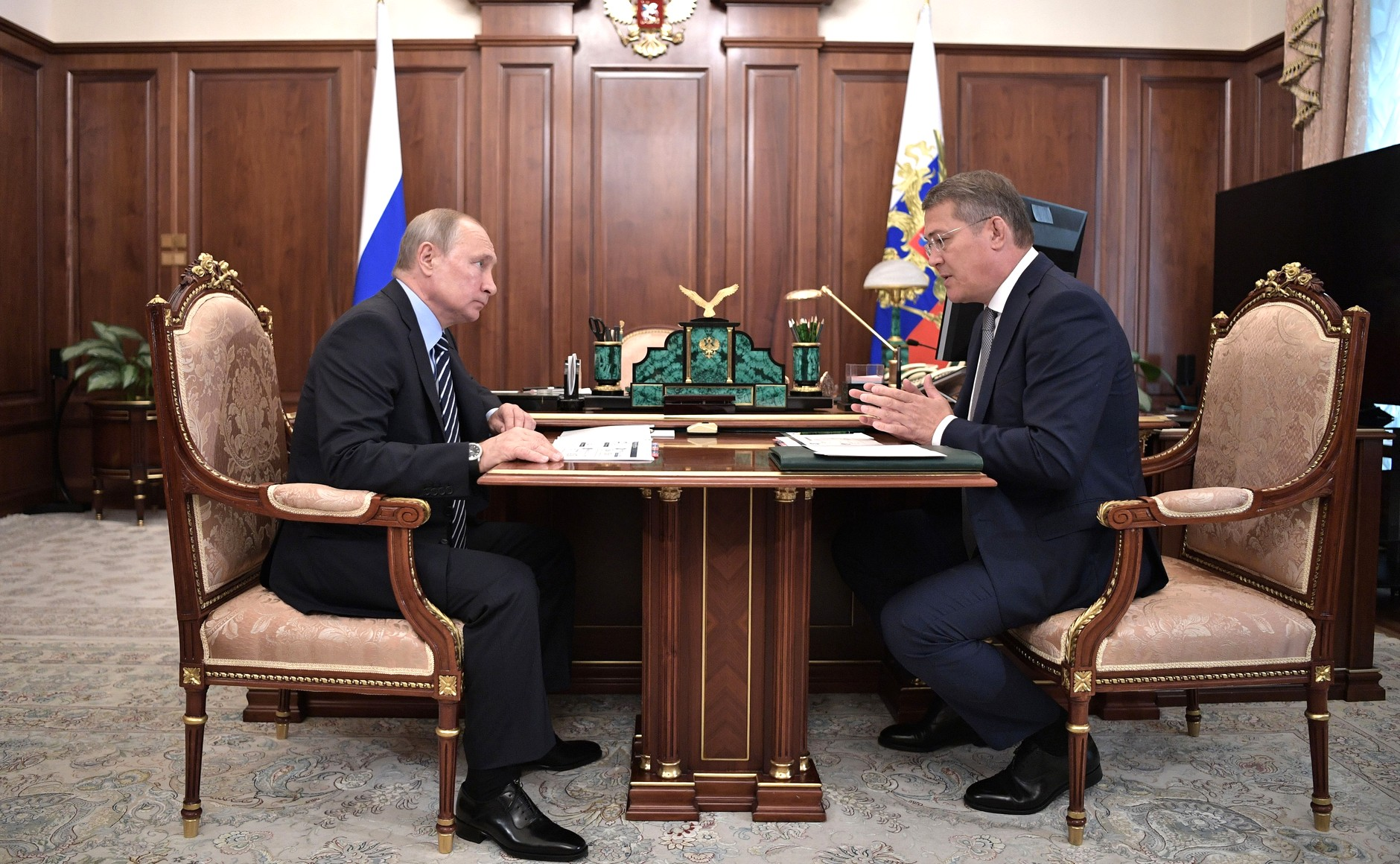
Khabirov with Russian President Vladimir Putin, 26 August 2019

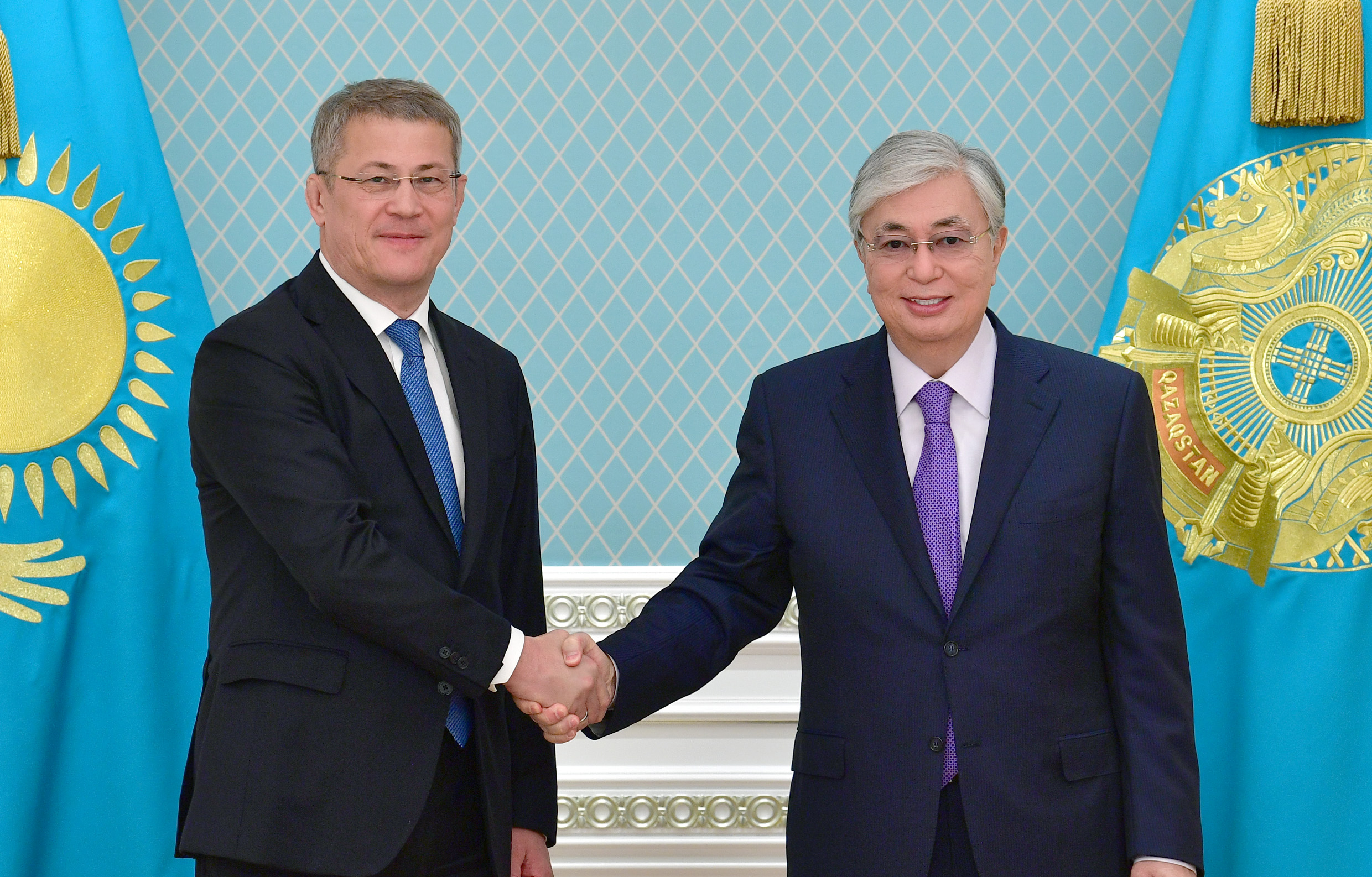
Khabirov with Kazakh President Kassym-Jomart Tokayev, 28 September 2021

Khabirov was born in the village of Sayranovo in the Ishimbaysky District of Bashkir ASSR. He is an ethnic Bashkir. From 1982 until 1984, he served in the Soviet Army. From 1984, he was a student at BashSU as well as assistant of the Department of State Law and Soviet Building of the law faculty in the same university; at the same time, he was chairman of the trade union committee of students. During 1992–1994 he was an undergraduate student at Bilkent University.

From 1994 until 1998, Khabirov was a senior lecturer at the Faculty of Law, BSU. From 1998 until 2002, he served as an assistant professor and deputy dean of the law faculty of BSU.

From 2002 until 2003, he served as acting director and then director of the Law Institute in Bashkir State University.

Between September 2003 and July 2008, Khabirov was head of the Administration of the President of the Republic of Bashkortostan. After that he became director of the Department for Relations with the Federal Assembly of the Russian Federation and Political Parties. Since 2009, he has been a deputy head of the Presidential office on domestic policy.

From 25 January 2017, Khabirov served as an acting head of the Krasnogorsk City District. From 28 March 2017 to 11 October 2018 worked as the Head of the urban district Krasnogorsk of the Moscow Oblast.

Since October 2018, Khabirov was appointed as an acting head of Bashkortostan. Khabirov was officially elected to be the Head after the 2019 Head of the Republic of Bashkortostan election, winning 82% of the vote.

== Criticism ==
During the 2003 Bashkortostan presidential elections, opposition candidates allegedly found a printing house which consisted of false ballots, which were ordered by Khabirov.

Vladimir Korostylev, deputy prosecutor of Bashkortostan, made a statement about the involvement of Khabirov in fake ballot blanks printing, but Florid Baykov, republic's prosecutor, disavowed the statement of his deputy, and the presidential administration designated the incident as a rude provocation of the head's of the republic opponents. The case did not develop, however, some media outlets mentioned Khabirov as a possible side in the fake ballots incident.

During the mass protests against Bashkir President Murtaza Rakhimov which took place in 2005, Khabirov actively supported Rakhimov, calling the protests "baboon dances" and accusing Murtaza's son Ural Rakhimov of financing the opposition.

After the appointment of Khabirov as the head of the region, the republic transferred Mount Kushtau to the development of the Bashkir soda company. On 3 August 2020, deforestation began on the hill. As a result, protestors gathered in Kushtau, whom were dissatisfied with the logging and destruction of the national Bashkir heritage. On 6 August, a member of the Human Rights Council under the Head of Bashkortostan Elza Maulimshina said that police detained several activists. On 15 August, about 200 private security officers came to the hill, resulting in clashes between them and the environmental activists. The demonstrators claimed that the security officers used gas from canisters against the crowd. More than 20 activists were detained. On 16 August, Khabirov called for an end in the Kushtau development, stating that the work would remain on pause until a compromise was found.

In July 1993, Khabirov signed the Natural memorial zones of national importance creation decree, which included Kushtau in its list. In 1996, Kushtau was cataloged in the preliminary World Heritage List edition UNESCO.

=== 2024 Bashkortostan protests ===
Following the arrest of an environmental activist Fail Alsynov and subsequent protests, Khabirov accused separatists of "stoking unrest".

In 2023, the Head of Bashkortostan, Radiy Khabirov, asked deputies of the local parliament to submit a bill to the State Duma proposing to transfer to Russian regions the authority to issue licenses for the extraction of gold using the loose method, worrying about the ecology and health of the region’s residents. "For quite a long time we have been concerned about the situation with gold mining in a number of areas of the Trans-Urals using the alluvial method. Residents of the republic and heads of municipalities learn that a license for gold mining has been issued when the first equipment appears. And people are very outraged by this. I propose something that concerns specifically the issuance of licenses for the extraction of gold using the loose method, and this is sometimes the most barbaric method of unscrupulous licensees... I ask you to come up with a proposal to transfer these powers to the level of the constituent entities of Russia, in this case, to our republic. "Really, I can’t say it any other way," I’m tired of it all," Khabirov said.

== Family ==
Khabirov has two daughters, Svetlana and Rita, from his first marriage with Larisa Lukyanova. His daughter Svetlana lives in Austria, while Rita lives in the United Kingdom. His second wife is Karine Habirova with whom he has two children, Farit and Timer.

== Sanctions ==
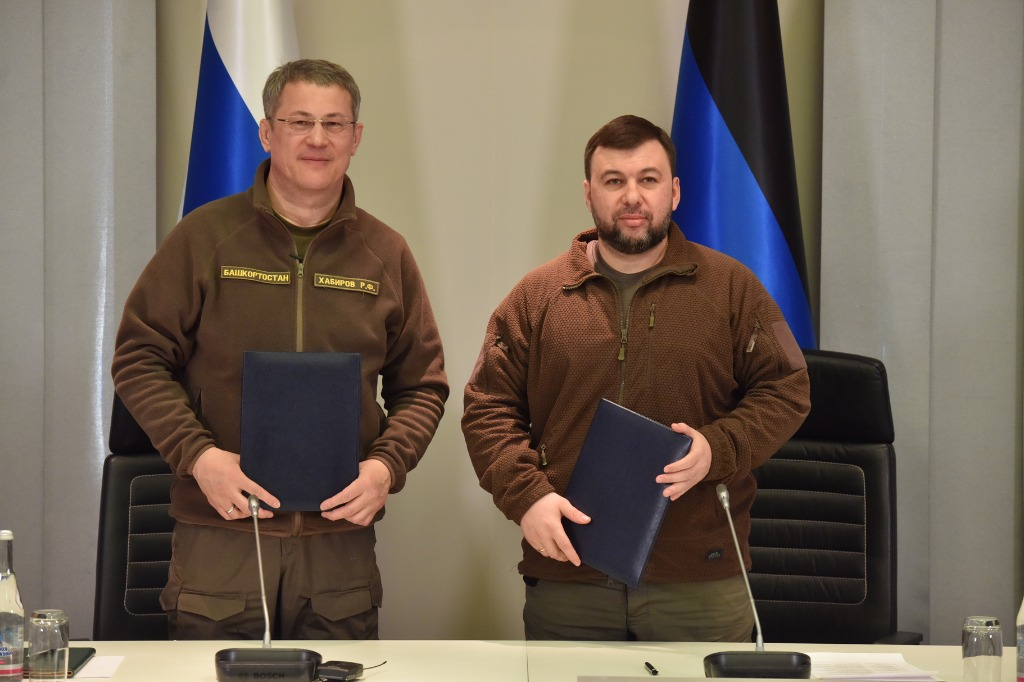
Khabirov with the head of the separatist self-proclaimed Donetsk People's Republic Denis Pushilin, Donetsk, 20 March 2022

In July 2022, Khabirov was sanctioned by the British government, after his open support for the 2022 Russian invasion of Ukraine.

For similar reasons, he is under sanctions from Australia and New Zealand. Previously, Khabirov was included by the FBK in the list of corrupt officials and warmongers, with a proposal to impose international sanctions against him.

On 18 December 2023, he came under sanctions from the European Union for active support of Russia's war against Ukraine.

As head of the republic, he supported and publicly approved of Russian aggression against Ukraine. He proposed to rally around Vladimir Putin and "stand up for his defense," and he also became one of the first governors to visit occupied Ukrainian territories. In addition, he prioritized the development of military capabilities, supporting a large number of defense enterprises and encouraging military personnel to participate in aggressive war through the formation of volunteer battalions. He was also responsible for organizing a logistics warehouse in occupied Ukrainian territory and opposed anti-war political opposition in Russia.

There has also been a call to sanction Khabirov's wife.

== Awards ==
- Order of Honour
- Russian Federation Presidential Certificate of Honour (2014)
- Order of the Republic of Crimea "For Fidelity to Duty" (2015)
- Honored Lawyer of the Republic of Bashkortostan (2008)
- Candidate Master of Sports in Greco-Roman wrestling
