= Rustem Khamitov =

Bashkir politician (born 1954)

- Рустэм Хамитов; Рөстәм Хәмитов
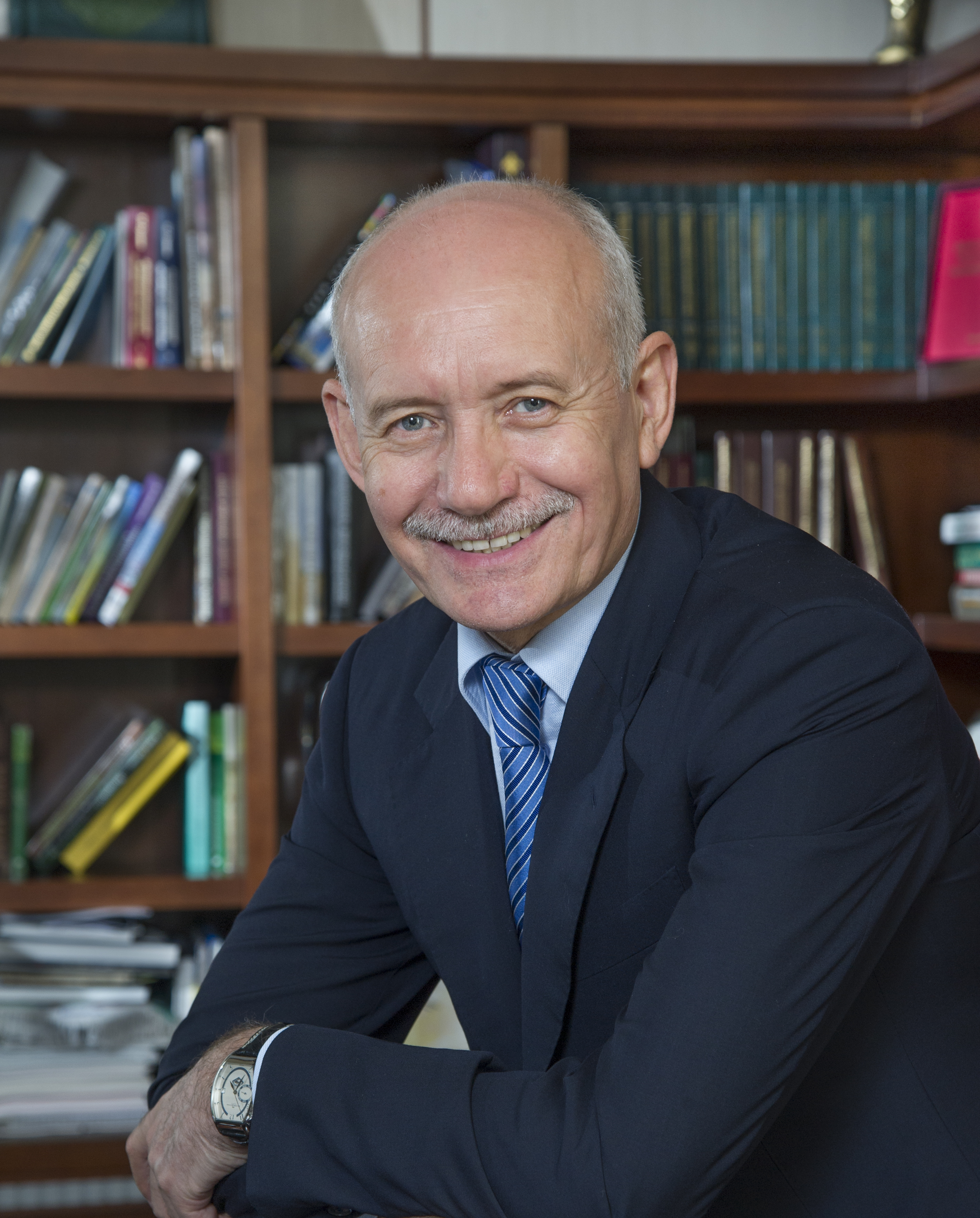
- Official portrait, 2014

2nd Head of the Republic of Bashkortostan
- In office 19 July 2010 – 11 October 2018
- Prime Minister: Rail Sarbaev; Azamat Ilimbetov; Rustem Mardanov
- Preceded by: Murtaza Rakhimov
- Succeeded by: Radiy Khabirov

Personal details
- Born: 15 August 1954 (age 71) Drachenino, Leninsk-Kuznetsky District, Kemerovo Oblast, Soviet Union
- Party: United Russia
- Spouse: Gulshat Gafurovna Khamitova
- Profession: Mechanical Engineer

Rustem Zakievich Khamitov (Russian: Рустэм Закиевич Хамитов, Russian pronunciation: [rʊˈstɛm zɐˈkʲijɪvʲɪt͡ɕ xɐˈmʲitəf]; Bashkir: Рөстәм Зәки улы Хәмитов, [røˈstæm zæki uɫɯ xæˈmitʊf]; born 18 August 1954) is a Russian politician and engineer who served as the 2nd Head of the Republic of Bashkortostan from 19 July 2010 to 11 October 2018. Khamitov is a member of the United Russia party, and belongs to the party's Supreme Council.

== Biography ==
Khamitov was born on 18 August 1954, in the village of Drachenino in Leninsk-Kuznetsky District, Kemerovo Oblast, Soviet Union Khamitov is ethnically Bashkir with the Bashkir language being his mother tongue, and also speaks Russian and English. His father, Zaki Salimovich Khamitov, was born in 1930 in Baltachevsky District of the Bashkir ASSR, and died in 1993. Zaki was a professor and doctor of technical sciences, and was praised with the title of Honored engineer of Bashkortostan. Between 1973 and 1980, he worked as dean of the agriculture mechanisation school at Bashkir State Agrarian University. His mother, Raisa Siniyatulovna Khamitova, worked as a mathematics teacher in a high school and is now retired. His younger brother, Rashid Khamitov, lives in Ufa and works as a driver.

== Education ==
Khamitov completed secondary school in 1971 at School No. 115 in Ufa. In 1977, Khamitov graduated from Higher Technical College in Moscow, specializing in aircraft engines, and has a degree of Doctor of Technical Science with a focus on automated control systems, and is the author of more than 100 scientific publications.

== Career ==
1977-1978 – master assistant at Ufa Engine-building enterprise;

1978-1986 – engineer, junior research associate, senior research associate at Ufa aviation institute;

1986-1988 – deputy head of the laboratory for the land use of aviation engines;

Since 1988 – chief of the scientific-production department in the Eastern division of the All-Russian Scientific and Research Institute for major pipelines construction;

1990-1993 – member of parliament of the Bashkir Autonomous Republic’s Supreme Council, chairman of the Supreme Council’s commission for ecology and rational use of natural resources;

1993-1994 – Director of the Institute of applied ecology and nature management of the Republic of Bashkortostan;

1994-1996 – Minister of wild-life conservation, nature management, prevention and liquidation of the emergency situations’ after-effects of Bashkortostan Republic;

1996-1999 – Minister for emergency situations and ecological security of Bashkortostan, member of the Security Council of the Republic of Bashkortostan;

1999-2000 – head of the department for prevention and liquidation of emergency situations under the Emergencies Ministry of Russian Federation (Moscow);

2000-2002 – chief federal inspector of Bashkortostan under the Plenipotentiary of the President of Russian Federation in Volga federal district;

2002 – acting deputy Plenipotentiary of the President of Russian Federation in Volga federal district. Responsible for interethnic and interfaith relations; coordinated the activity of territorial agencies of the Emergencies Ministry of Russian Federation, Ministry of Taxation and Federal Tax Police Service of Russia;

2003-2004 –chief of the interregional inspectorate for the biggest tax-payers N4; head of the Biggest Tax-Payers Department under the Ministry of Taxation of the Russian Federation;

22 March 2004 – May, 20th 2009 – Head of the Federal Water Resources Agency under control of the Ministry of Environmental resources of Russia;

July 2009-July 2010 – deputy President of JSC “RUSHYDRO”;

On 15 July 2010, Khamitov was appointed the interim acting President of the Bashkortostan Republic in accordance with the decree of the President of Russian Federation Dmitry Medvedev;

On 19 July 2010, the deputies of the State Council-Kurultay of the Bashkortostan Republic have approved the candidature of Khamitov, offered by the President of Russia and vested him with the authority of the President of the Bashkortostan Republic;

On 30 May 2014, the President of Russia, Vladimir Putin, accepted Khamitov’s resignation so that he could participate in the regional elections;

On 14 September 2014, he was elected as the President of Bashkortostan in the 2014 presidential election.

On 25 September 2014, the inauguration process took place in the State Council-Kurultay of the Bashkortostan Republic.

== Criticism ==
=== High prices for tariffs and services ===
The State Committee on Tariffs set unreasonable prices for heat and hot water and energy to the population, which were higher than in Moscow and other economically developed regions of the country. For example, the heat energy in the city of Moscow for the townspeople will cost 1,806.89 rubles. In Ufa, the same service, according to the resolution of the State Committee of the Republic No. 780 of 19 December 2017, for consumers of "BashRTS" Ltd of Inter RAO is 2,045.57 rubles per Gcal from 1 July 2018. The standard of living and the subsistence level in the regions are several times different, and consumers in Bashkiria pay more. Also it should be taken into account that in Moscow the possibility of a payment for the actually consumed heat is realized and Moscow residents pay on a heat meter, and in Ufa, if there are heat meters in the houses, the authorities put obstacles to the residents.

== Awards ==
Order of Honour (13 October 2014) - for achievements in labor, social activities and long-term of dedicated work.

Honorable Diploma of the Government of the Russian Federation (21 August 2014) - for merits to the state in the field of environmental protection and long-term dedicated work.

Badge of Honour "For merits to physical fitness and sports promotion" (30 October 2013) - for great personal contribution to physical fitness and sports promotion in the Russian Federation, promotion of healthy lifestyle and in connection with the 90th anniversary of the founding of the federal (government) and regional executive bodies in the sphere of physical culture and sports.

Honorable Diploma of Bashkortostan Republic (24 August 1999) - for dedicated work in the field of environmental protection and population protection from emergency situations.

Pitirim Sorokin Honorable silver medal "For contribution to science".

== Personal life ==
Mr. Khamitov is married, has two children, one grandson and one granddaughter. His wife, Gulshat Khamitova, is a functional diagnostics doctor by her profession. Mr. and Mrs. Khamitov have known each other since early childhood. Their son, Kamil, is an engineer and graduate of Ufa State Aviation Technical University, and previously worked in a private technical design bureau, since March 2011 is employed by RusHydro. Their daughter, Nouriya, works in a travel company. Both of Khamitov's children live and work in Moscow.

Khamitov's hobbies include downhill skiing, reading, going to theatres, and music.
