= Ivan Sukharev =

Russian politician

Ivan Sukharev MP
- Иван Сухарев
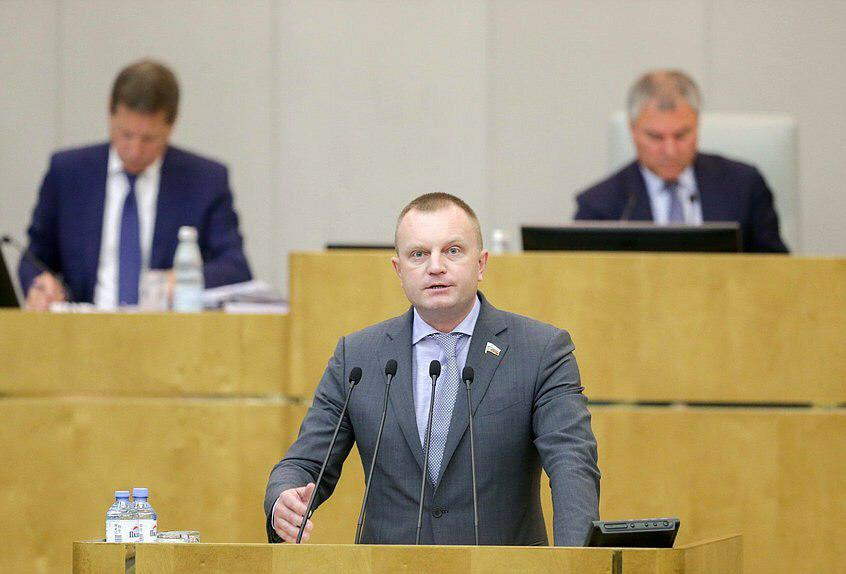

Member of the State Duma (Party List Seat)
- Incumbent
- Assumed office 21 December 2011

Personal details
- Born: 10 June 1978 (age 48) Ufa, RSFSR, USSR
- Party: Liberal Democratic Party of Russia
- Education: Bashkir State University (2000); RANEPA (2013)

Ivan Konstantinovich Sukharev (Russian: Иван Константинович Сухарев; born 10 June 1978, Vladivostok) is a Russian political figure and a deputy of the 6th, 7th, and 8th State Dumas.

In 1998, Sukharev joined the Liberal Democratic Party of Russia. From 1998 to 2001, he was a member of the Ufa branch of the party. From 2001 to 2003, he was the Head of the Public Reception office of Vladimir Zhirinovsky in Ufa. From 2003 to 2007, he worked as a coordinator of the Ufa branch of the party. From 2001 to 2006, Sukharev worked as a lawyer at the Bashkir Republican Bar Association. From 2011 to 2016, he was the deputy of the 6th State Duma. He became one of the initiators of the Dima Yakovlev Law. In May 2014, he supported referendums on the creation of the Donetsk and Luhansk People's Republic. In 2016 and 2021, he was re-elected for the 7th, and 8th State Dumas.

== Attitude Toward Bashkirs and Tatars ==
Although Sukharev was born in Ufa, the capital of Bashkortostan, and was repeatedly a candidate for the head of Bashkortostan, in 2011 he supported Vladimir Zhirinovsky’s remarks about deporting Bashkirs and Tatars to Mongolia.

== Views and Initiatives ==
Ivan Sukharev advocates for the establishment of a political system in Russia with three or four leading parties, which, in his view, would help "pull Russia out of its democratic hangover".

According to Sukharev, raising the issue of Russian-speaking children studying the Russian language in schools in Bashkortostan "is regarded as incitement of interethnic hatred".

Following a high-profile incident in Turkey that resulted in the death of the Russian ambassador, Sukharev proposed considering the possibility of securing Russian diplomats through special forces. One possible option, he suggested, could be the Chechen special forces.
