= Christian persecution =

Christian persecution may refer to:

- History of Christian thought on persecution and tolerance

Persecution of other groups by Christians

- Historical persecution by Christians
- Persecution of Heathens (disambiguation)
- Persecution of pagans in the late Roman Empire
- Christian persecution of paganism under Theodosius I
- Anti-paganism policy of Constantius II
- Persecution of Germanic Pagans (disambiguation)
- Persecution of Ottoman Muslims
- Persecution of Jews
- Black Death Jewish persecutions

Persecutions of Christians by other Christians

- Anti-Catholicism
- Anti-Protestantism
- Persecution of Eastern Orthodox Christians
- Persecution of Christians in Mexico

Persecution of Christians by other groups

- Persecution of Christians
- Persecution of Christians in the New Testament
- Persecution of Christians in the Roman Empire
  - Decian persecution
  - Persecution in Lyon
  - Diocletianic Persecution
  - List of Christians martyred during the reign of Diocletian
- Gothic persecution of Christians
- Persecution of Eastern Orthodox Christians
- Persecution of Oriental Orthodox Christians
  - Persecution of Copts
- Persecution of Christians in the modern era
  - Nazi persecution of the Catholic Church in Germany
  - Persecution of Jehovah's Witnesses in Nazi Germany
  - Persecution of Christians in the Soviet Union
  - Persecution of Christians in the Eastern Bloc
  - Eastern Catholic victims of Soviet persecutions
  - Religious persecution during the Soviet occupation of Bessarabia and Northern Bukovina
  - Anti-Christian violence in India
  - Genocide of Christians by ISIL
  - Persecution of Christians in the Muslim world

== See also ==
- Persecution of Orthodox Christians (disambiguation)
- Christian persecution complex, the belief that Christianity is oppressed in the Western world
- Religious persecution
