= Religious persecution during the Soviet occupation of Bessarabia and Northern Bukovina =

During the Soviet occupation, the religious life in Bessarabia and Northern Bukovina underwent a persecution similar to the one in Russia between the two World Wars. In the first days of occupation, certain population groups welcomed the Soviet power and some of them joined the newly established Soviet nomenklatura, including NKVD, the Soviet political police. The latter has used these locals to find and arrest numerous priests. Other priests were arrested and interrogated by the Soviet NKVD itself, then deported to the interior of the USSR, and killed. Research on this subject is still at an early stage. According to priest and academic Viorel Cojocaru, some 400 out of more than 1,000 Bessarabian priests at the time (or almost one third) were arrested, deported, or exterminated by the Soviet authorities. As of 2007, the Christian Orthodox church has bestowed the martyrdom to circa 50 clergymen who died in the first year of Soviet occupation (1940–1941).

In 1940–1941, several churches were sacked, looted, transformed into public or utility buildings, or closed. Taxes were set, which the believers were obliged to pay if they wanted to pray and be allowed to hold the mass. When Romanian authorities returned after June 1941, churches and monasteries were rebuilt and opened again, but persecution resumed in 1944, when Soviet forces reconquered the territory.

The (incomplete) list below contains clergymen of any denomination. Like the majority of the population of the region, most of the people named below were Romanian Christian Orthodox. A person is listed below only if the church has officially used the term martyr in reference to the individual. In doing so, Christian churches have to follow a three-step rule: martyrium materialiter (violent death), martyrium formaliter ex parte tyranni (for the faith on the part of the persecutors), martyrium formaliter ex parte victimae (conscious acceptance of God's will).

- Alexandru Baltagă (April 14, 1861 – August 7, 1941), founder of Bessarabian religious press in Romanian, member of Sfatul Țării (1917–1918).
- Alexandru Motescu (d. June 28, 1941), a Bessarabian Romanian Orthodox priest in the city of Tighina. According to the deposition of several witnesses in face of the Comisia de triere in Buzău in 1941, at the onset of the Soviet occupation of Bessarabia, he was caught by a group of Communist supporters and violently mocked. His tongue and ears were cut, then he was taken to the altar, where he was set on fire, and died in horrible pain.
- Artemie Munteanu (b. 1888), abbot of the Noul Neamț Monastery. In 1942, he sent monastery funds to help the Romanian Army, and in spring 1944 he evacuated the monastery's assets to Romania. On August 30, 1945, he was arrested by the NKVD, and on December 11, 1945, he was sentenced to ten years of forced labor in the Gulag camps.
- Gheorghe Munteanu (April 22, 1909 – 1940), a Bessarabian Romanian Orthodox priest. In 1931, he graduated from the Faculty of Theology of the University of Iași, and was ordained a priest in December 1931, being assigned to the Nerușai parish, Ismail County. On July 1, 1935, he became parish priest of the Regina Maria Church in a suburb of the city of Ismail. He was arrested in the summer of 1940, his hair was cut and his beard was shaved amidst demands that he renounce his faith. When he repeatedly refused, his NKVD tormentors smashed his head on the steps of the Cathedral in Ismail. The people of the city buried him secretly.

== See also ==
- Religion in the Soviet Union
- Soviet anti-religious legislation
- Persecution of Christians in Warsaw Pact countries
- Persecution of Christians in the Soviet Union
- Persecutions of the Catholic Church and Pius XII
- USSR anti-religious campaign (1917–1921)
- USSR anti-religious campaign (1921–1928)
- USSR anti-religious campaign (1928–1941)
- USSR anti-religious campaign (1958–1964)
- USSR anti-religious campaign (1970s–1990)
- Eastern Catholic victims of Soviet persecutions
- Persecution of Muslims in the former USSR
- Persecution of Jehovah's Witnesses in the Soviet Union
- Red Terror
