= Ufa Plateau =

Plateau in Russia

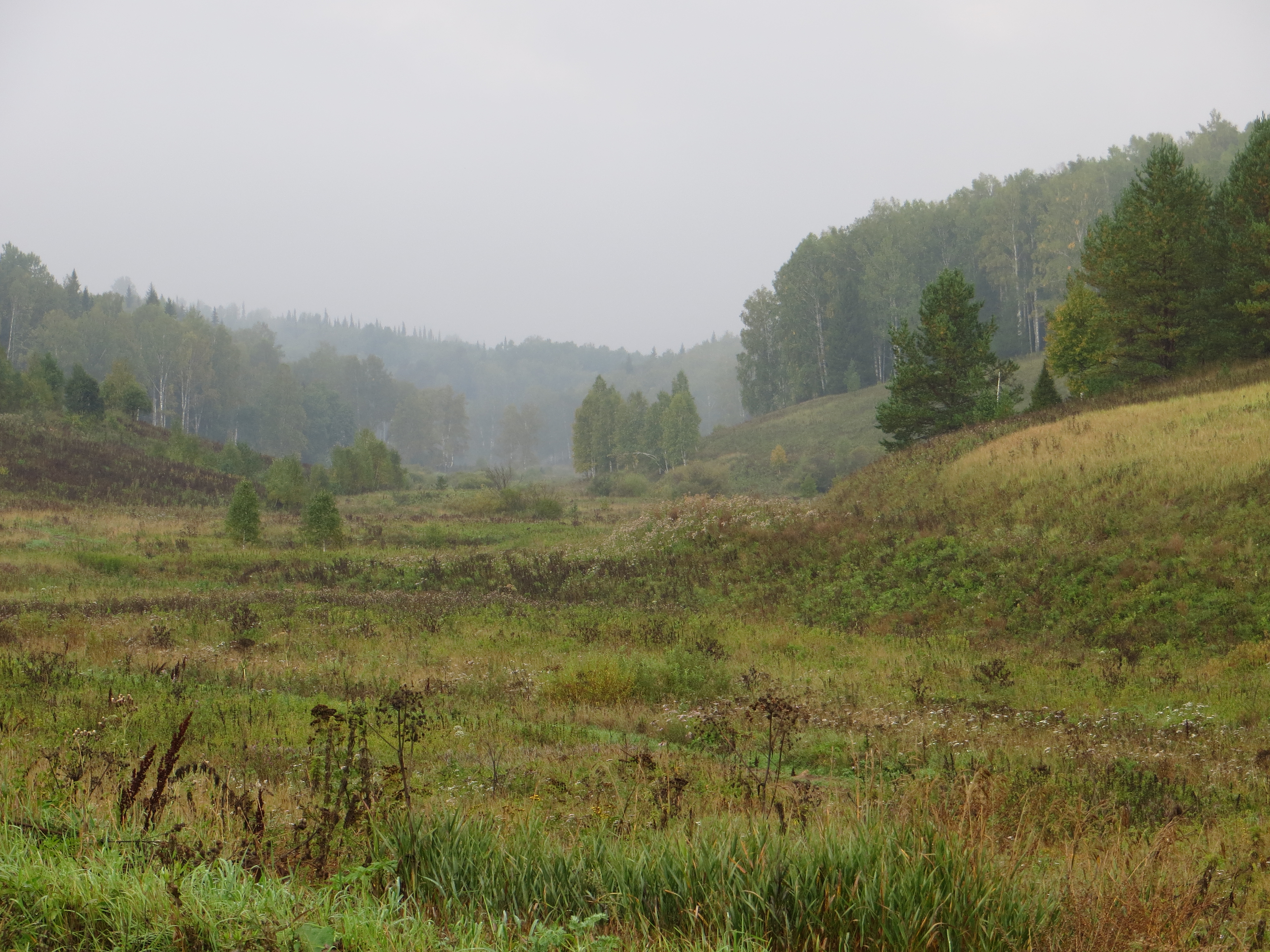
A ravine in the Ufa Plateau

The Ufa Plateau is a plateau where the city of Ufa is located in Bashkortostan and Sverdlovsk Oblast, Russia. Parts of the Ufa, Yuryuzan River, and Ay River basins are included in the plateau. The distance between the northern and southern ends of the plateau is 150 km (93 mi).
