= Ufa =

Capital of Bashkortostan, Russia

Ufa Уфа
- City

Other transcription(s)
  - Bashkir: Өфө
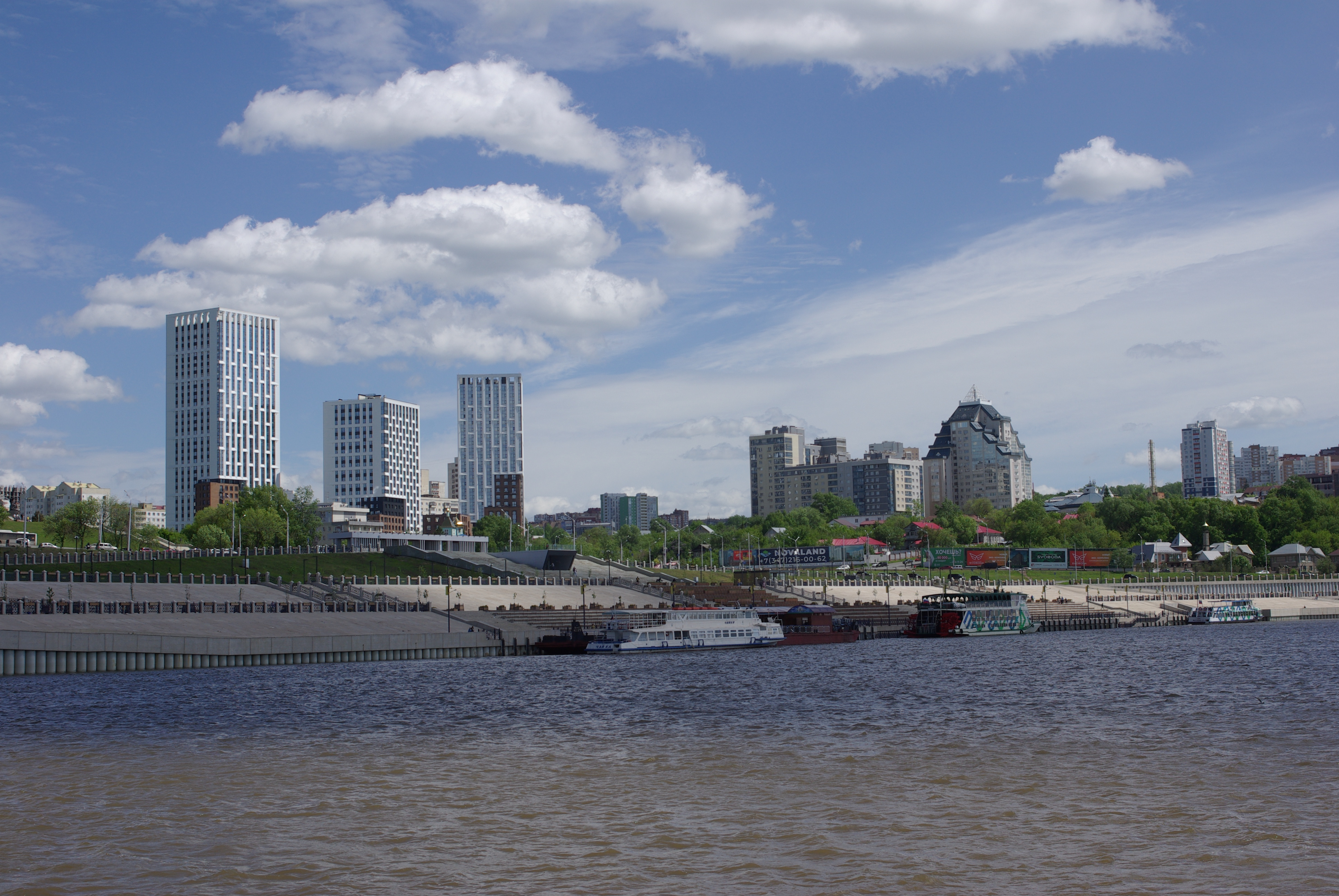
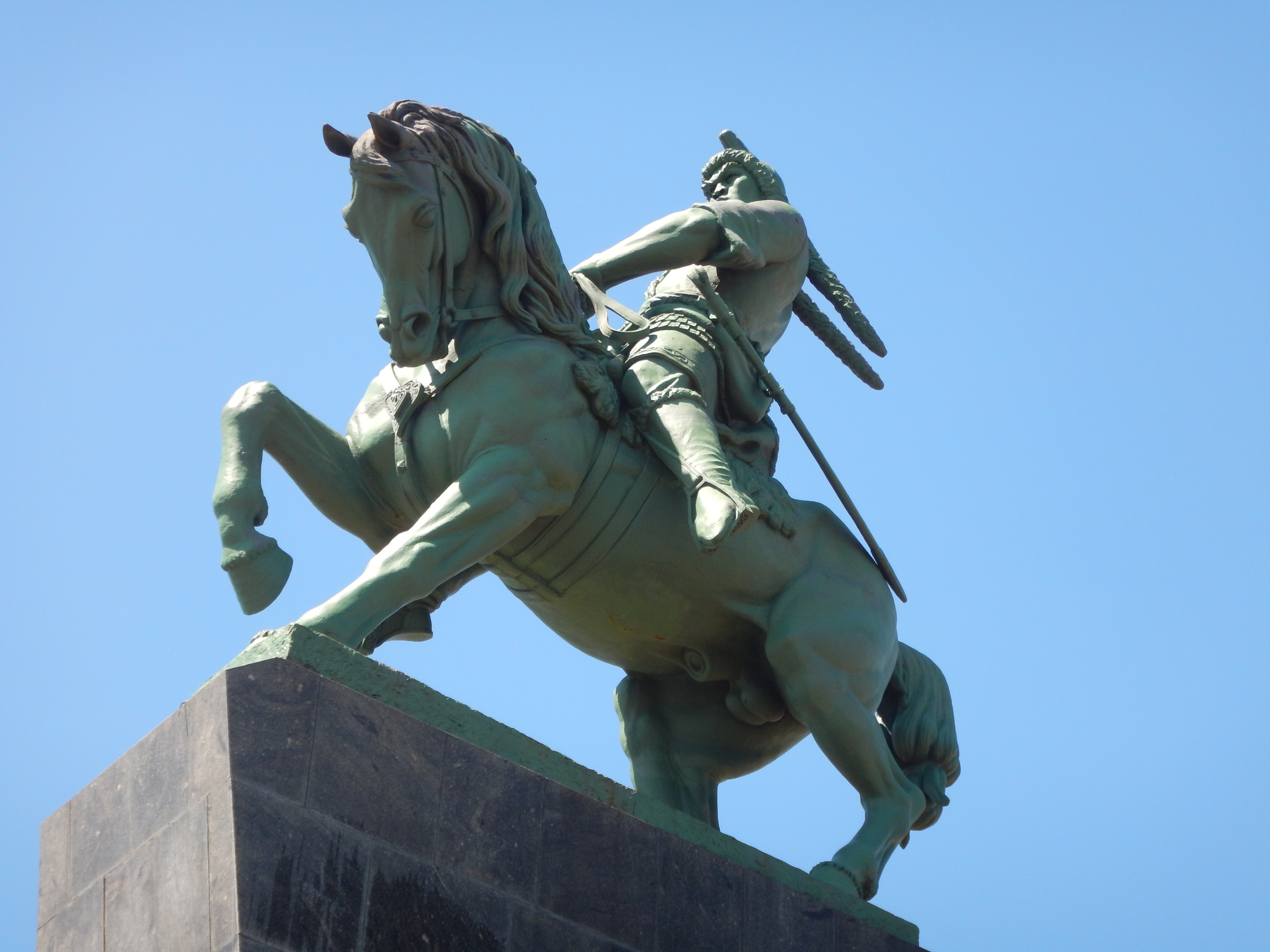
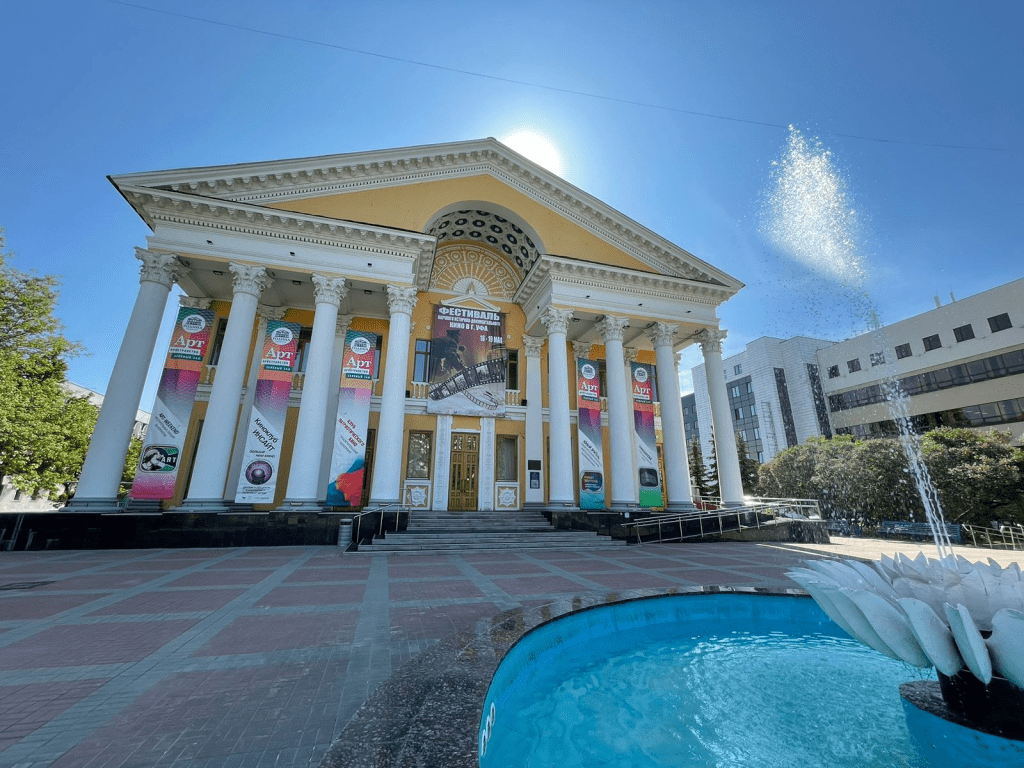
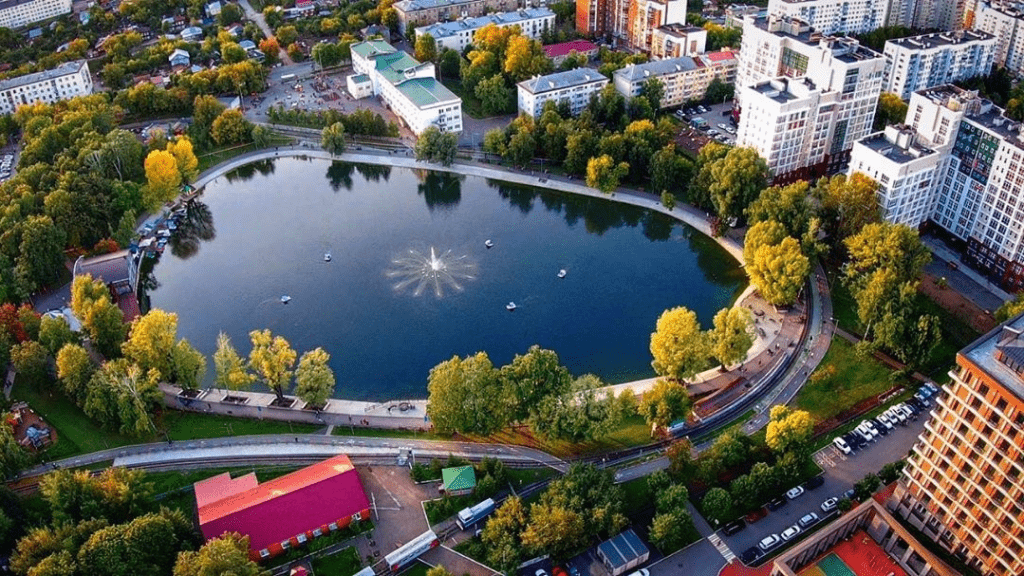
- Nogarev House Aerial view of Central Ufa Monument to Salavat Yulaev Ufa Cathedral Park Yakutova Lala Tulpan

- Flag Coat of arms
- Interactive map of Ufa
- Location of Ufa Ufa (European Russia) Ufa (Europe)
- Coordinates: 54°43′34″N 55°56′51″E
- Country: Russia
- Federal subject: Bashkortostan
- Founded: 1574
- City status since: 1586

Government
  - Body: City Council
  - Head: Ratmir Mavliev

Area
  - Total: 707.93 km^{2} (273.33 sq mi)
- Elevation: 150 m (490 ft)

Population (2010 Census)
  - Total: 1,062,319
  - Estimate (January 2016): 1,121,429 (+5.6%)
  - Rank: 11th in 2010
  - Density: 1,500.6/km^{2} (3,886.5/sq mi)

Administrative status
  - Subordinated to: city of republic significance of Ufa
  - Capital of: Republic of Bashkortostan
  - Capital of: city of republic significance of Ufa, Ufimsky District

Municipal status
  - Urban okrug: Ufa Urban Okrug
  - Capital of: Ufa Urban Okrug, Ufimsky Municipal District
- Time zone: UTC+5 (MSK+2)
- Postal codes: 450000–450010, 450013–450015, 450017–450019, 450022, 450024, 450026–450030, 450032–450035, 450037–450040, 450043–450045, 450047, 450049–450059, 450061–450065, 450068, 450069, 450071, 450073–450081, 450083, 450091–450093, 450095–450101, 450103–450106, 450880, 450890, 450911–450948, 450951–450966, 450971–450979, 450981–450986, 450989–450999, 901139, 901229, 992200
- Dialing code: +7 347
- OKTMO ID: 80701000001
- Website: ufacity.info

Ufa (Note: /uːˈfɑː/ oo-FA, /ˈuːfə/ OO-fə; Russian: Уфа IPA: [ʊˈfa]; Bashkir: Өфө, romanized: Öfö, IPA: [ʏ̞ˈfʏ̞]) is the capital and largest city of Bashkortostan, Russia. The city lies at the confluence of the Belaya and Ufa rivers, in the centre-north of Bashkortostan, on hills forming the Ufa Plateau to the west of the southern Ural Mountains, with a population of over 1.1 million residents, up to 1.4 million residents in the urban agglomeration. Ufa is the tenth-most populous city in Russia, and the fourth-most populous city in the Volga Federal District.

The city was founded in 1574, when a fortress was built on the site by the order of Ivan the Terrible. Ufa was made capital of Ufa Governorate in 1865 when the governorate split from Orenburg Governorate. Ufa's population expanded during the early 20th century.

Ufa's economy consists primarily of the oil refining, chemistry, and mechanical engineering industries; the petroleum company Bashneft and several of its subsidiaries are headquartered in Ufa. Ufa is an ethnically diverse city, home to a substantial number of ethnic Bashkirs and Tatars, with an ethnic Russian majority population. Several educational institutions are located in Ufa, including Bashkir State University, Ufa State Aviation Technical University, Ufa State Petroleum Technological University, and Ural State Law University. The city hosted separate summits of the BRICS group as well as the Shanghai Cooperation Organisation in 2015.

== Etymology ==
The name Ufa comes from the Ufa River on which the city lies, but the origin of the river's name is disputed. The Russian linguist Aleksandr Matveyev proposed that the name is of Iranian origin, from "ap", meaning water.

In a paper published in 2014, researchers Karimov and Khabibov from Bashkir State Pedagogical University present and argue for a hypothesis according to which before the construction of the foundational Russian fortress in 1574, which has since grown to become the current city of Ufa, there had already been an ancient settlement called Ufa on a hilltop near the mouth of the Ufa River. According to them, this settlement was founded by Turkic-speaking tribes to perform rituals and sacrifices to the sky god Tengri, and they called this place Upe or Ufe because, they argue, in ancient Turkic languages a place of ritual sacrifice used to be called an "opo" or an "ope." They further hypothesize that the inhabitants of the settlement themselves also came to be called the Upe or Ufe tribe and subsequently, the river along which they flourished and expanded their settlement towards its source also came to be called Ufa. Karimov and Khabibov claim that the Russian fortress builders were probably aware of this ancient name and consequently named their new settlement Ufa.

It is colloquially called the City of Three Screws, due to the unusual nature of city's name in Bashkir.

== History ==
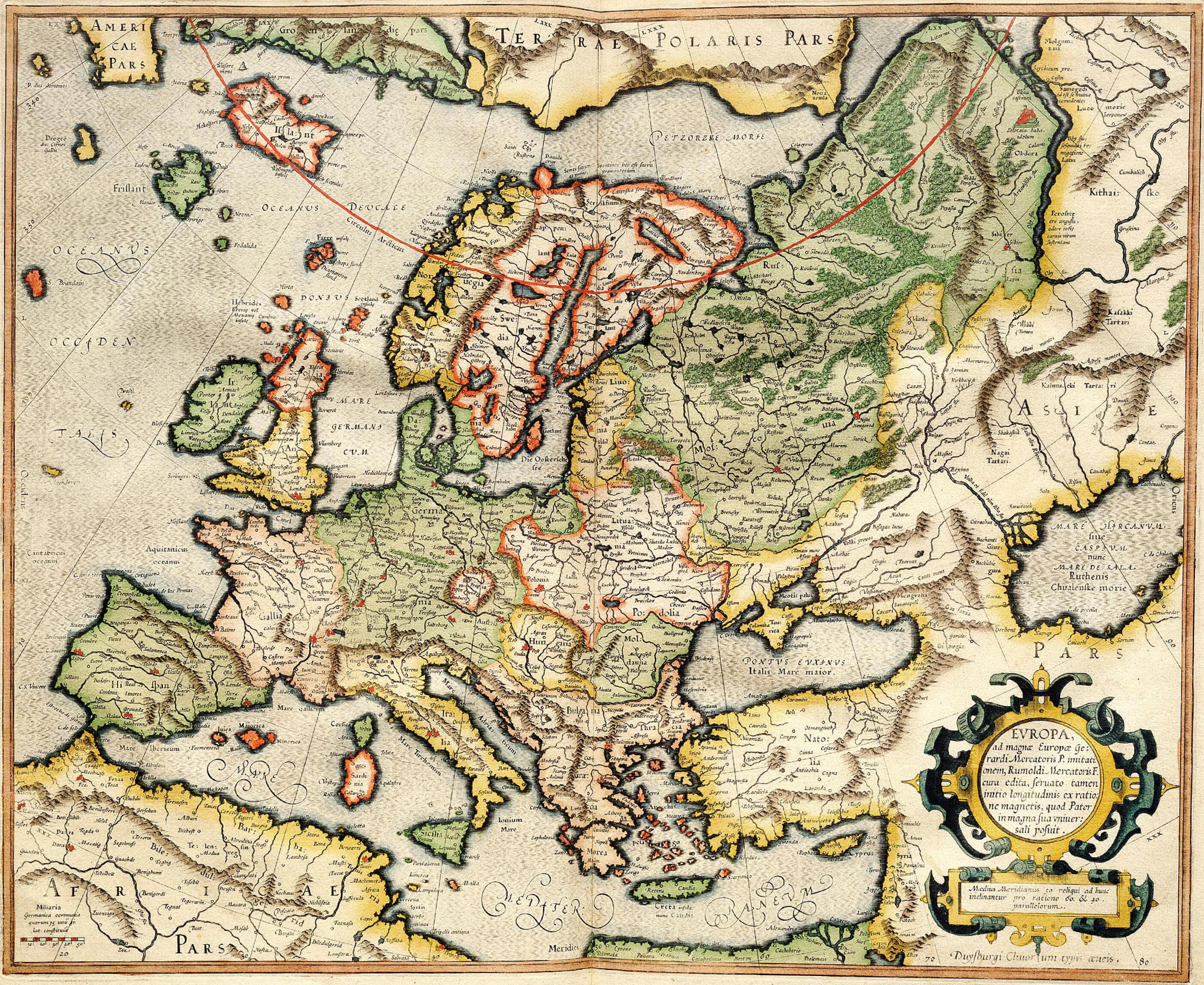
Gerardus Mercator's map of Europe with Pascherti (Bashkort) settlement presumably in the position of modern Ufa. The map was compiled in 1554, twenty years before the official date of the foundation of Ufa.

Early history of the surrounding area of Ufa dates back to Paleolithic times. Presumably, from the 5th to 16th centuries there was a medieval city on the site of Ufa. On the Pizzigano brothers' map (1367), and on the Catalan Atlas (1375), a town approximately on the Belaya River was designated as Pascherti (Bashkort), and Gerardus Mercator's map (1554) also marked the settlement with the name Pascherti. French orientalist Henri Cordier associates the position of Pascherti with the current location of Ufa.

Ibn Khaldun called the town, among the largest cities of the Golden Horde, Bashkort.

Russian historian of the 18th century Peter Rychkov wrote that there was a great city on the territory of Ufa before the arrival of the Russians.

The official of the Orenburg Governorate government Vasily Rebelensky wrote that Ufa was founded by the Bashkirs.

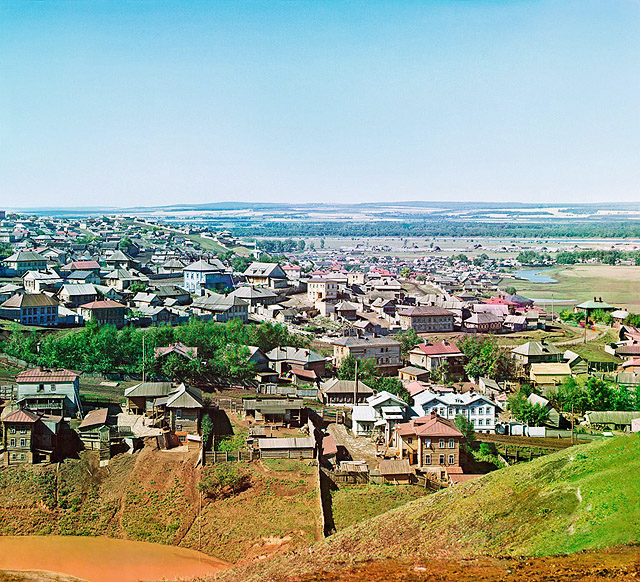
Early color photograph of Ufa taken in 1910 by Sergey Prokudin-Gorsky

By order of Ivan the Terrible, a fortress was built on the site of modern Ufa in 1574, and originally bore the name of the hill it stood on, Tura-Tau. 1574 is now considered to be the official date of Ufa's foundation. Town status was granted to it in 1586.

Before becoming the seat of a separate Ufa Governorate in 1781, the city, along with the rest of the Bashkir lands, was under the jurisdiction of the Orenburg governors. And even though the 1796 reform reunited Orenburg and Ufa again, in 1802, the city of Ufa became a new center of the entire Orenburg Governorate that included large territories of modern-day Republic of Bashkortostan, Orenburg Oblast, and Chelyabinsk Oblast.

Monuments were erected in two of the city's graveyards to commemorate those shot and buried in the 1930s, during and before the Great Terror.

The Belaya River Waterway (1870) and the Samara-Zlatoust Railroad (1890) connected the city to the European part of the Russian Empire and stimulated the development of the city's light industry. During World War II, following eastward Soviet retreat in 1941, the Abwehr operated in Ufa, 1941–1943, some German infiltration, occurred 1914–1943 in espionage, many industrial enterprises of the western parts of the Soviet Union were evacuated to Ufa. On 4 June 1989, the Ufa train disaster occurred about 75 kilometers away from the city when a pipeline leak released gas near a railway line. When two trains approached, the sparks from the brakes of one train ignited the gas, causing an explosion which killed 575 people.

== Administrative and municipal status ==
Ufa is the capital of the republic and, within the framework of the administrative divisions, it also serves as the administrative center of Ufimsky District, even though it is not a part of it. As an administrative center, it is, together with twenty-four rural localities, incorporated separately as the city of republic significance of Ufa, an administrative unit with status equal to that of the districts, and is likewise home to a unit of Russia's Central Military District; the 12th Separate Guards Engineer Brigade. As a municipal division, the city of republic significance of Ufa is incorporated as Ufa Urban Okrug.

=== Administrative districts ===
Ufa administrative districts: 01 Dyomsky 02 Kalininsky 03 Kirovsky 04 Leninsky 05 Oktyabrsky 06 Ordzhonikidzevsky 07 Sovetsky

Ufa is divided into seven administrative districts.

| No. | District | Population as of January 1, 2020 |
|---|---|---|
| 1 | Dyomsky | 80,714 |
| 2 | Kalininsky | 207,750 |
| 3 | Kirovsky | 162,958 |
| 4 | Leninsky | 89,062 |
| 5 | Oktyabrsky | 246,476 |
| 6 | Ordzhonikidzevsky | 164,682 |
| 7 | Sovetsky | 177,145 |

== Economy ==
According to Forbes, in 2013, Ufa was the best city in Russia for business among cities with a population of over one million.

Many urban enterprises engaged in oil refining, chemistry, and mechanical engineering reside in Ufa. Additionally, the economy of Ufa is composed of many fuel, energy, and engineering complexes.

Ufa is home to about 200 large and medium industrial enterprises.

Some important enterprises in Ufa include:

- Ufa Engine-Building Production Association: subsidiary of UEC Saturn (gas turbine engines)
- Ufimsky petrochemical Plant (subsidiary of Bashneft)
- Novo-Ufimsky refinery plant (subsidiary of Bashneft)
- Ufimsky refinery plant (subsidiary of Bashneft)
- Bashkir Trolleybus Manufacturing Plant JSC: trolley manufacturer

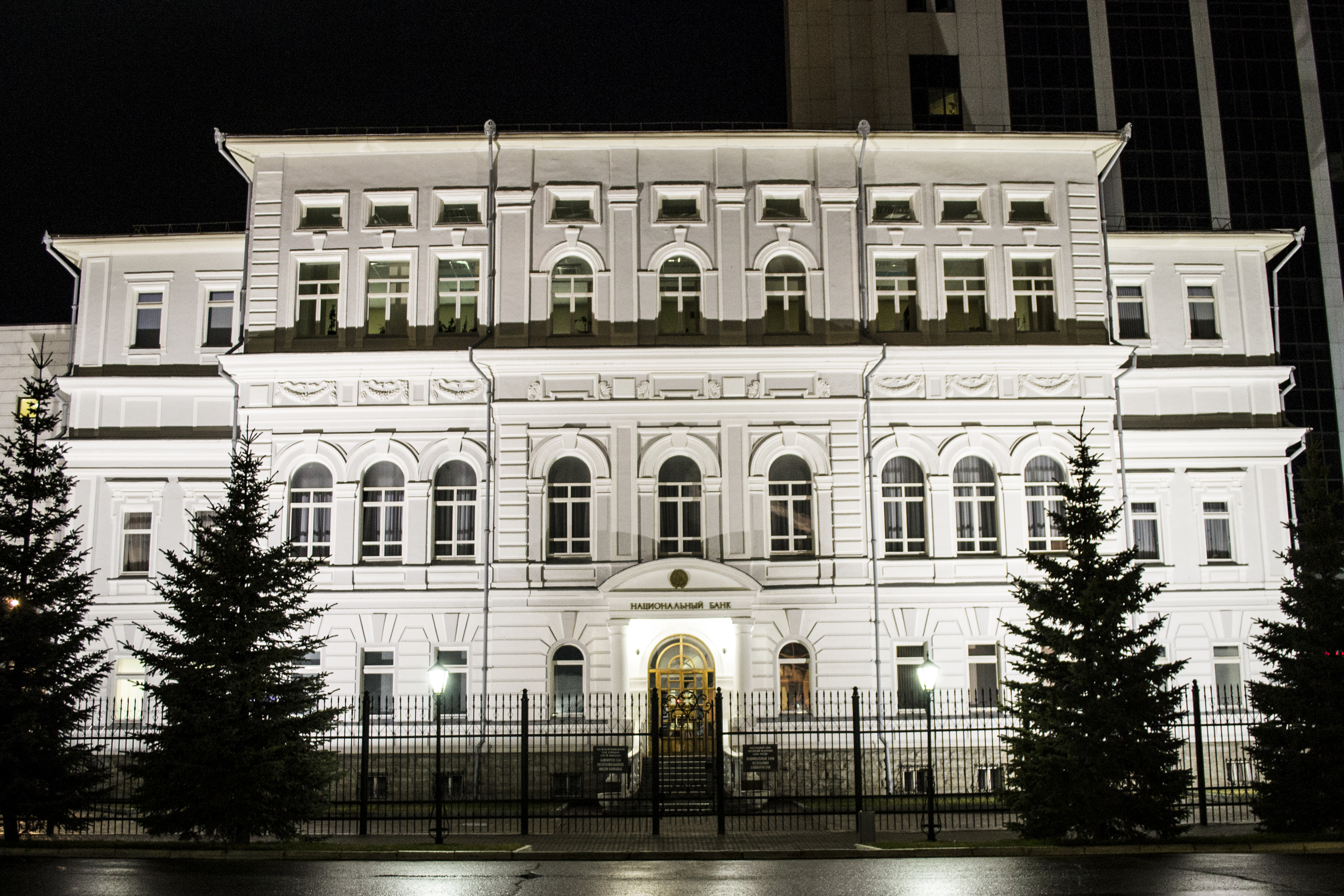
National Bank of Bashkortostan

== Transportation ==
Ufa Station is linked to the rest of Russia, being on a historic branch of the Trans-Siberian Railway. Ufa is the only city connected to Moscow by more than one federal highway. The M7 motorway links the city to Kazan and Moscow and the M5 motorway links Ufa to Moscow and to the Asian part of Russia.

The Ufa International Airport has international flights to Turkey, Tajikistan, Egypt, Azerbaijan, Uzbekistan, and Cyprus as well as domestic flights to many Russian cities and towns, including Moscow.

The Ufa Metro is a planned and oft-delayed subway system, discussed since the late 1980s. On May 30, 1996, there was a ceremony marking the beginning of preparatory construction work, attended by then-President Boris Yeltsin.

Public transportation in Ufa includes trams (since 1937) and trolleybuses (since 1962), as well as bus and marshrutka (routed cabs) lines.

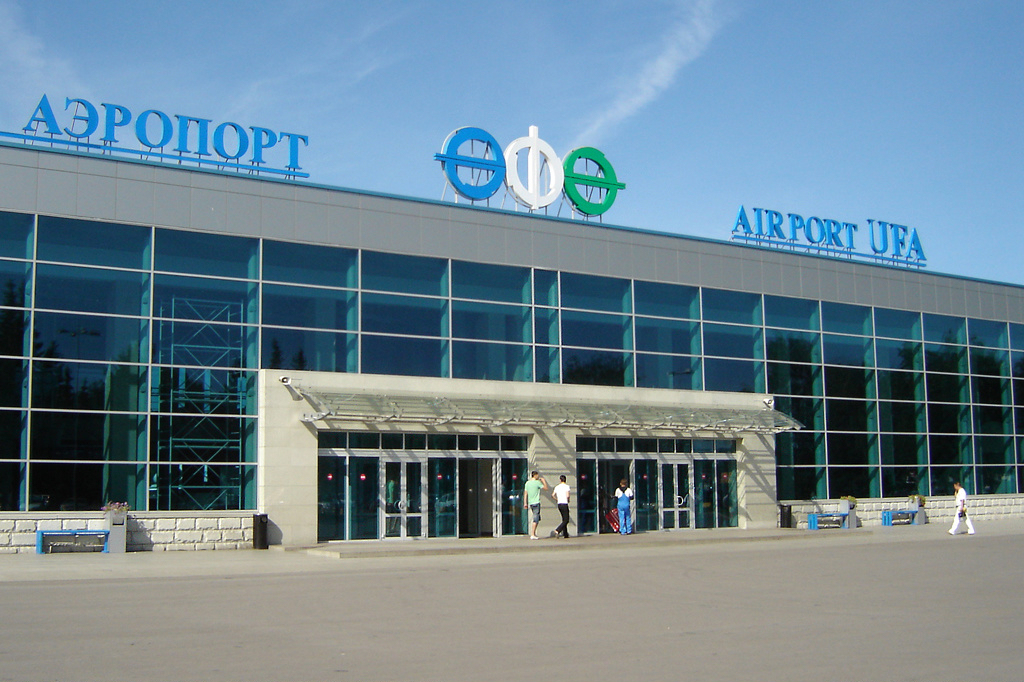
Ufa International Airport. The inscription "ӨФӨ" is "Ufa" in the Bashkir language.

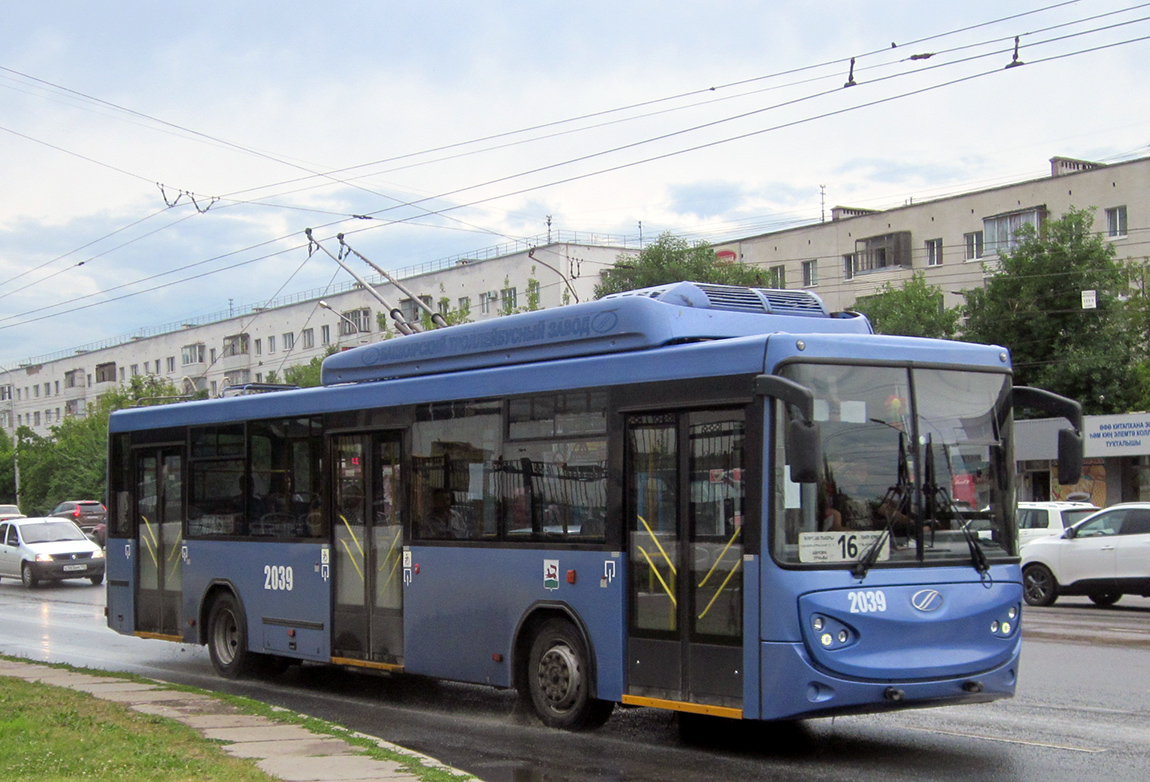
BTZ-52763 trolleybus

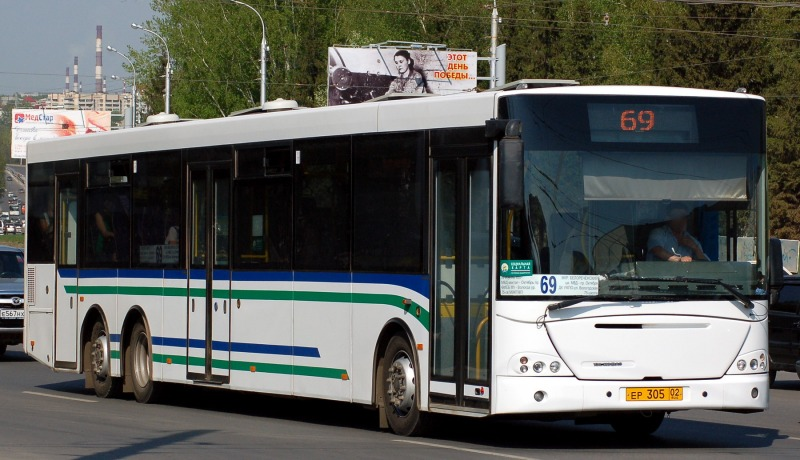
VDL-NefAZ bus

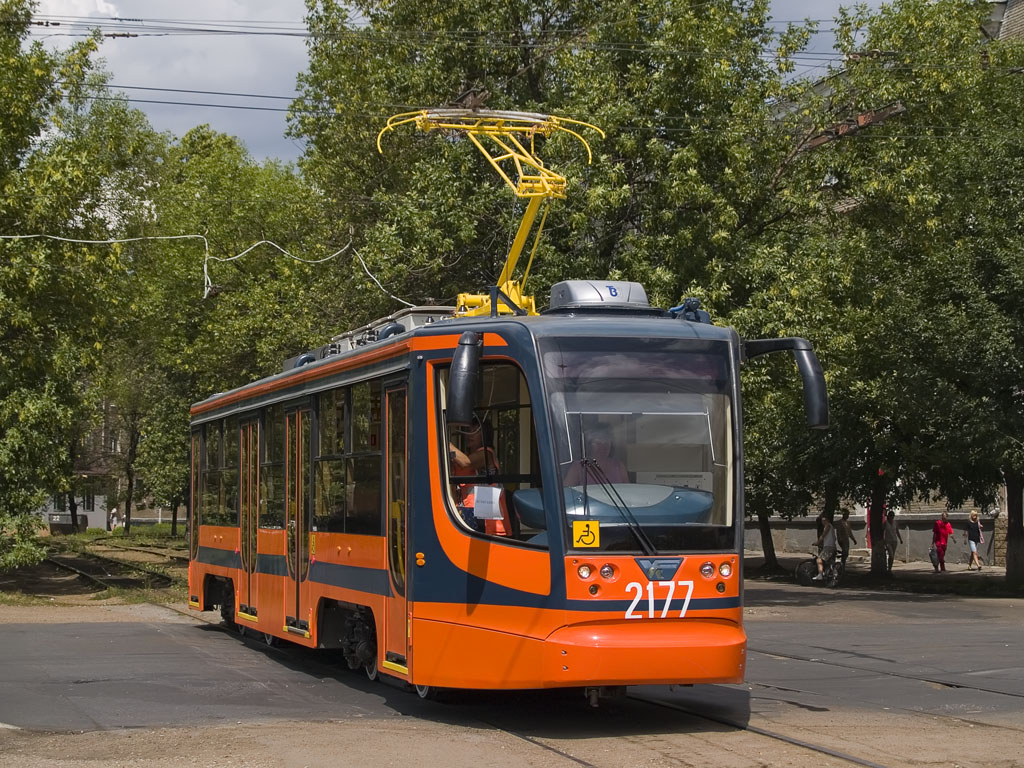
71-623 low-entry tram

== Demographics ==
Historical population
| Year | Pop. | ±% |
|---|---|---|
| 1897 | 49,275 | — |
| 1926 | 97,737 | +98.4% |
| 1939 | 250,011 | +155.8% |
| 1959 | 546,878 | +118.7% |
| 1970 | 770,905 | +41.0% |
| 1979 | 969,289 | +25.7% |
| 1989 | 1,082,052 | +11.6% |
| 2002 | 1,042,437 | −3.7% |
| 2010 | 1,062,319 | +1.9% |
| 2021 | 1,144,809 | +7.8% |
Source: Census data

The population of Ufa exceeded one million in 1980. It ranks 10th among Russian cities by population, and the 26th among cities in Europe by city proper. As of January 1, 2009, the city accounted for 25.4% of all residents of the republic or 42.2% of the urban population.

As of the 2021 Census, the ethnic composition of Ufa was:

| Ethnicity | Number | Percentage |
|---|---|---|
| Russians | 557,492 | 48.9% |
| Tatars | 308,381 | 27.0% |
| Bashkirs | 233,128 | 20.4% |
| Others | 41,618 | 3.6% |

Religion in Ufa (2024)
1. Islam (52.5%)
2. Orthodox (32.5%)
3. Other Christian (3.00%)
4. Other (2.00%)
5. non-religious individuals (10.0%)

== Geography ==
Ufa is situated in Eastern Europe near its land boundary with Northern Asia, at the confluence of the Belaya (Agidel) and Ufa Rivers, on low hills forming the Ufa Plateau to the west of the southern Urals. The area of the city is 707.93 km^{2} (273.33 sq mi). It stretches from north to south for 53.5 km (33.2 mi) and from west to east for 29.8 km (18.5 mi).

=== Climate ===
Ufa has a warm summer continental climate (Köppen: Dfb). Ufa's climate is characterized by harsh winters, but in some cases, summers can be quite long and hot. The coldest temperature ever recorded in Ufa was −48.5 °C (−55.3 °F) on January 1, 1979. The highest temperature ever recorded was 39.4 °C (102.9 °F) on July 10, 2023.

Climate data for Ufa (1991–2020, extremes 1853–present)
| Month | Jan | Feb | Mar | Apr | May | Jun | Jul | Aug | Sep | Oct | Nov | Dec | Year |
|---|---|---|---|---|---|---|---|---|---|---|---|---|---|
| Record high °C (°F) | 5.8 (42.4) | 9.2 (48.6) | 16.2 (61.2) | 31.1 (88.0) | 36.2 (97.2) | 38.3 (100.9) | 39.4 (102.9) | 38.5 (101.3) | 33.4 (92.1) | 26.8 (80.2) | 15.4 (59.7) | 5.0 (41.0) | 39.4 (102.9) |
| Mean daily maximum °C (°F) | −8.1 (17.4) | −6.6 (20.1) | 0.6 (33.1) | 11.4 (52.5) | 20.5 (68.9) | 24.3 (75.7) | 26.0 (78.8) | 24.0 (75.2) | 17.6 (63.7) | 9.1 (48.4) | −0.5 (31.1) | −6.8 (19.8) | 9.3 (48.7) |
| Daily mean °C (°F) | −12.2 (10.0) | −11.6 (11.1) | −4.4 (24.1) | 5.7 (42.3) | 13.7 (56.7) | 17.9 (64.2) | 19.8 (67.6) | 17.6 (63.7) | 11.6 (52.9) | 4.9 (40.8) | −3.5 (25.7) | −10.4 (13.3) | 4.1 (39.4) |
| Mean daily minimum °C (°F) | −16.8 (1.8) | −16.7 (1.9) | −9.5 (14.9) | 0.2 (32.4) | 7.0 (44.6) | 11.4 (52.5) | 13.5 (56.3) | 11.8 (53.2) | 6.6 (43.9) | 1.3 (34.3) | −6.6 (20.1) | −14.5 (5.9) | −1.0 (30.2) |
| Record low °C (°F) | −48.5 (−55.3) | −43.5 (−46.3) | −34.4 (−29.9) | −27.8 (−18.0) | −9.7 (14.5) | −1.2 (29.8) | 1.4 (34.5) | −0.1 (31.8) | −6.8 (19.8) | −25.6 (−14.1) | −35.1 (−31.2) | −45.0 (−49.0) | −48.5 (−55.3) |
| Average precipitation mm (inches) | 46 (1.8) | 39 (1.5) | 38 (1.5) | 31 (1.2) | 51 (2.0) | 63 (2.5) | 51 (2.0) | 55 (2.2) | 48 (1.9) | 57 (2.2) | 47 (1.9) | 51 (2.0) | 577 (22.7) |
| Average extreme snow depth cm (inches) | 31 (12) | 42 (17) | 40 (16) | 6 (2.4) | 0 (0) | 0 (0) | 0 (0) | 0 (0) | 0 (0) | 0 (0) | 5 (2.0) | 17 (6.7) | 42 (17) |
| Average rainy days | 3 | 3 | 6 | 12 | 16 | 16 | 15 | 16 | 18 | 18 | 11 | 4 | 138 |
| Average snowy days | 25 | 21 | 16 | 6 | 1 | 0 | 0 | 0 | 1 | 8 | 20 | 24 | 122 |
| Average relative humidity (%) | 83 | 80 | 77 | 69 | 61 | 68 | 71 | 74 | 76 | 79 | 83 | 83 | 75 |
| Mean monthly sunshine hours | 54.4 | 96.1 | 159.0 | 219.9 | 278.9 | 300.6 | 314.4 | 250.7 | 160.2 | 88.1 | 54.5 | 42.8 | 2,019.6 |
Source 1: Pogoda.ru.net
Source 2: NOAA

=== Ecological problems ===
Periodically, a suffocating, unpleasant chemical odor can be smelled in the Ufa region. The media reports about the smell come out with an impressive regularity. Not all these reports are groundless, and the culprits are getting out of responsibility due to the fact that there is no Continuous Emission Control System (CEMS) in the city.

There are no street vacuum cleaners, road vacuum sweepers, or industrial (street) vacuum cleaners on the streets. Unfortunately, there is a complete lack of sanitation services in the city.

According to the letter of the Federal Service for Hydrometeorology and Environmental Monitoring (Roshydromet) No. 20-18 / 218 of 11.07.18: "In the framework of solving problems at the federal level in the implementation of the state monitoring of atmospheric air, the territorial office of Roshydromet – FGBU Bashkir UGMS monitors pollution of atmospheric air in Ufa at nine stationary posts of the state observation network located in different parts of the city to estimate the level of air pollution generated by the total release and stationary and mobile sources of pollutants. Suspended substances (dust) are measured at all nine posts of the state observation network. The results of observations of the pollutants content are presented on the official website of the Bashkir State Hydrometeorological Service in the section "Monitoring of environmental pollution" daily and monthly. In 2017, the maximum single concentration of suspended solids reached 4.6 MPC m. in March 2017, at the address: Oktyabrya Ave., 141, located near the motorway with heavy traffic, and in April 2017 at the post: Dostoyevsky St., 102/1, located in the area of the industrial enterprise. During 2017 almost all posts of the state observation network recorded exceedances of a single concentration of suspended substances. At the same time, in order to implement regional state environmental oversight aimed at preventing, detecting, and suppressing violations by public authorities, local authorities, and legal entities, individual entrepreneurs and citizens of requirements in the field of atmospheric air protection, under the Ministry of Natural Resources and the Environment of the Republic Bashkortostan operates the State Bank of the Republic of Belarus "Office of State Analytical Control," to whose tasks, including GSI "organization of periodic environmental monitoring mobile laboratories in the areas where the population lives in the republic and in the zones of protective measures in the system of the general program of integrated environmental and sanitary-hygienic monitoring." Going to the site found that all 9 posts of the state observational network of Roshydromet are located at a considerable distance from the area of Inors and Sipaylovo, from residential areas. Control of MPC and air quality in residential areas is not carried out.

== Government ==
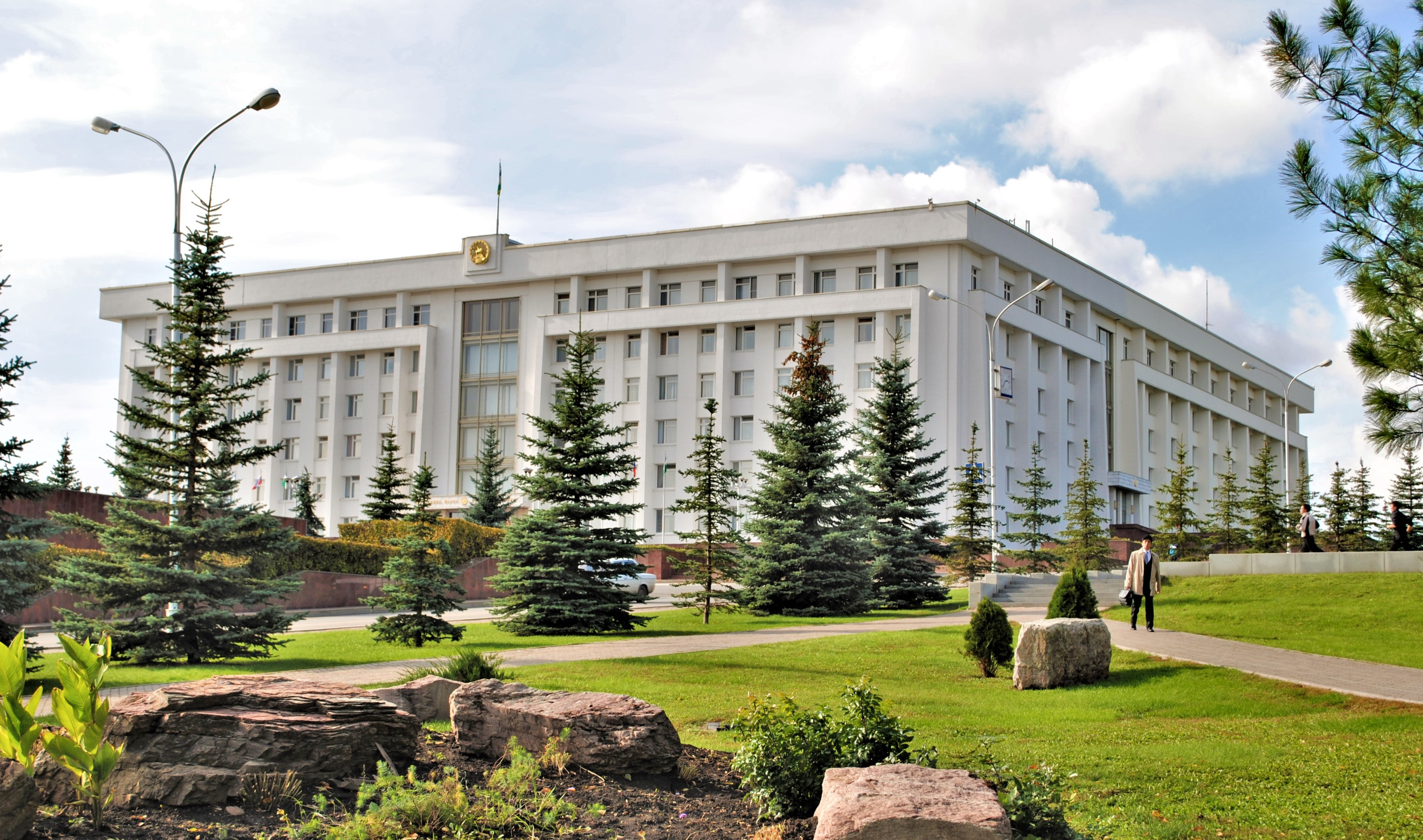
House of Republic or Bashkir White House

The bodies of local self-government of Ufa are:

- Council: A representative body consisting of 35 deputies for four years.
- Chairman of the Board: the head of the urban okrug. Term of four years.
- Urban Okrug Administration. The structure of the administration approved by the council on the proposal of the Head of the Administration.
- Head of the Administration manages the administration on the principles of unity of command. He is appointed under a contract entered into by the results of the competition. The term of office of the Head of the Administration is limited to the period of office of the Council of the convocation.

== Sport ==
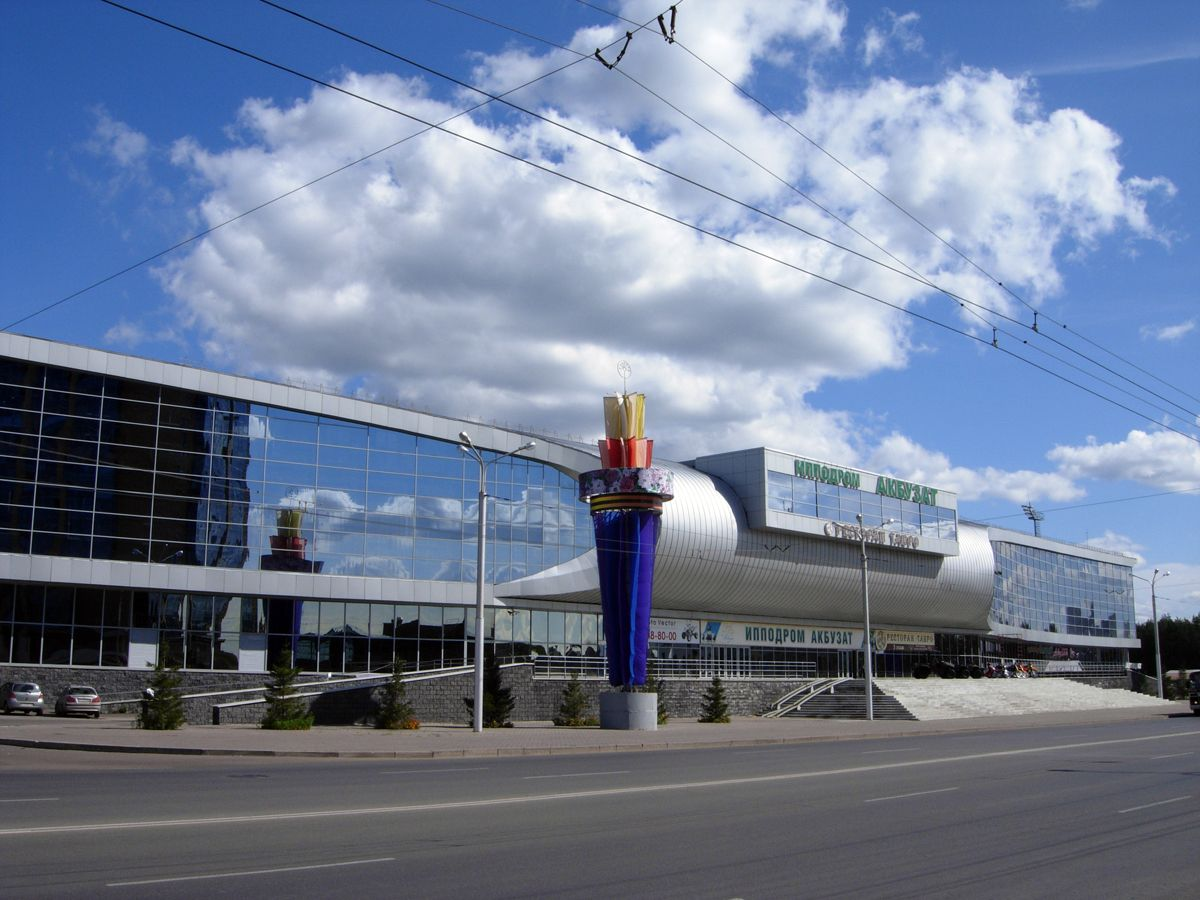
Akbuzat racecourse. Named after the winged horse in the mythology of Bashkirs, analogue of Pegasus

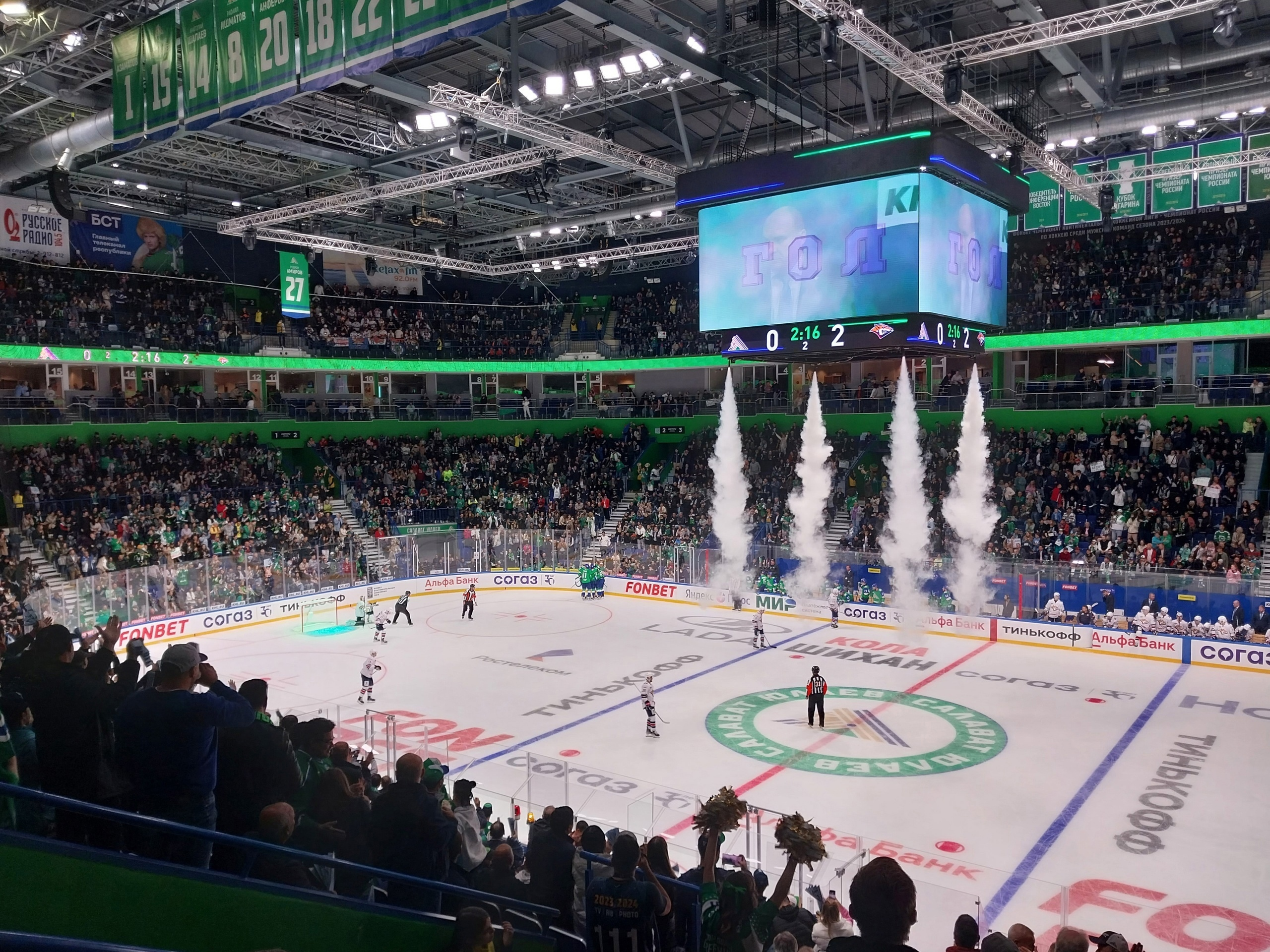
The Ufa Arena

| Club | Sport | Founded | League | League Rank | Stadium |
|---|---|---|---|---|---|
| Salavat Yulaev Ufa | Ice Hockey | 1961 | Kontinental Hockey League | 1st | Ufa Arena |
| Tolpar Ufa | Ice Hockey | 2009 | Minor Hockey League | Jr. 1st | Ice Palace Salavat Yulaev |
| HC Agidel Ufa | Ice Hockey | 2010 | Russian Women's Hockey League | 1st | Ice Palace Salavat Yulaev |
| FC Ufa | Football | 2009 | Russian First League | 2nd | Neftyanik Stadium |
| Ural Ufa | Volleyball | 1992 | Volleyball Super League | 1st | Dynamo Sports Palace |
| Samrau-UGNTU | Volleyball | 1970 | Women's Volleyball Super League | 2nd | Dynamo Sports Palace |
| Ugntu-VNZM | Handball | 1960 | Russian Handball Super League | 1st | Sports Complex UGNTU |
| Ufa-Alisa | Handball | 1989 | Russian Women's Handball Super League | 1st | FOK Sports School 32 |
| Ufimets | Basketball | 2012 | | 3rd | BGAU |

The Stroitel Stadium is a sports stadium located north of the centre of the city, off the Aleksandra Nevskogo Ulitsa street in Neftekhimikov (Petrochemists') Park. The stadium is primarily an Ice speedway venue.

Bashkiria Ufa were one of the most successful speedway clubs in the country. They won the Soviet Union Championship eleven times from 1962 to 1988 but disbanded in 1998. They raced at the Trud Stadium (Ufa), which was demolished in 2005, making way for the Ufa Arena.

== Education and science ==
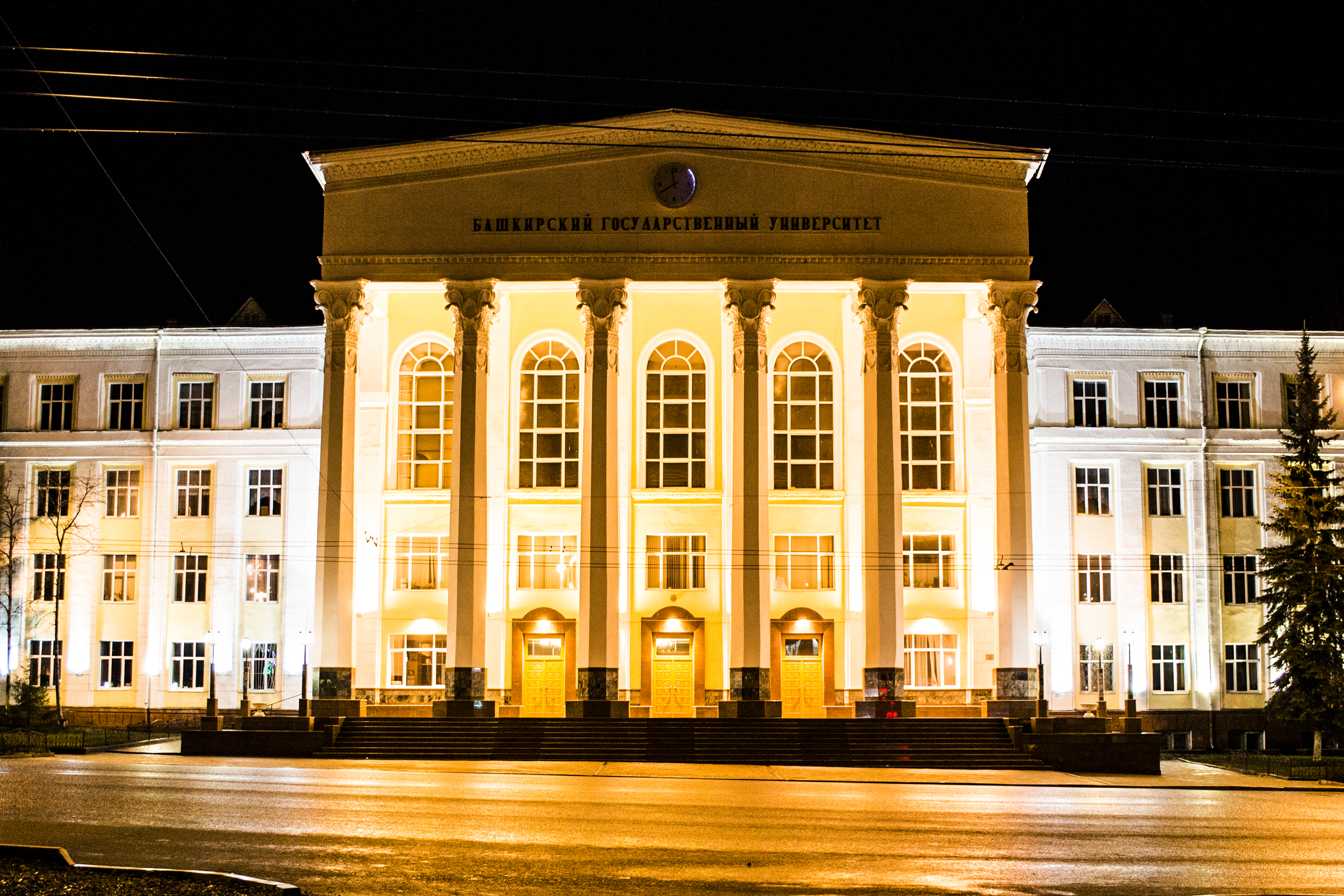
Bashkir State University, the main campus

Educational institutions include:

- Bashkir State University
- Ufa University of Science and Technology
- Ufa State Aviation Technical University
- Ufa State Petroleum Technological University
- Bashkir State Medical University
- Bashkir State Agrarian University

Graduate universities and law schools:

- Ural State Law Academy Ufa's campus

Scientific institutions include:

- Academy of Sciences of the Republic of Bashkortostan
- Ufa Scientific Center of the Russian Academy of Science (USC RAS)

In Ufa, there is the Ufa branch of the Financial University and the Ufa branch of the Russian State Economic University. Plekhanov, where there are practically no check digits for admissions to the budget. They are housed in good-quality buildings, but they do not benefit from them to society, more and more often, rumors are circulating about them that they are designed for siphoning money – since there are practically no budget places for economic specialties in Ufa. In the economic specialties of the magistracy, the plan for admission to Ufa universities is no more than 30 budget places.

== Arts ==
In 2020, the world's first monument to a tick was erected in the city center of Ufa on a stone base from the Ural Mountains with the inscription: "Same as you I also want to live".

== Religion ==
The major religions in the city are Sunni Islam and Russian Orthodoxy. The Bezpopovtsy strain of Russian Old Believers is also registered in Ufa.

Ufa is the location of the Central Spiritual Administration of Muslims in Russia. In 1989, the Russian Islamic University was opened. One of the largest mosques in Europe, Ar-Rahim, is under construction in Ufa.

Since 2019, Ainur Birgalin has been working as the Mufti of Bashkortostan.

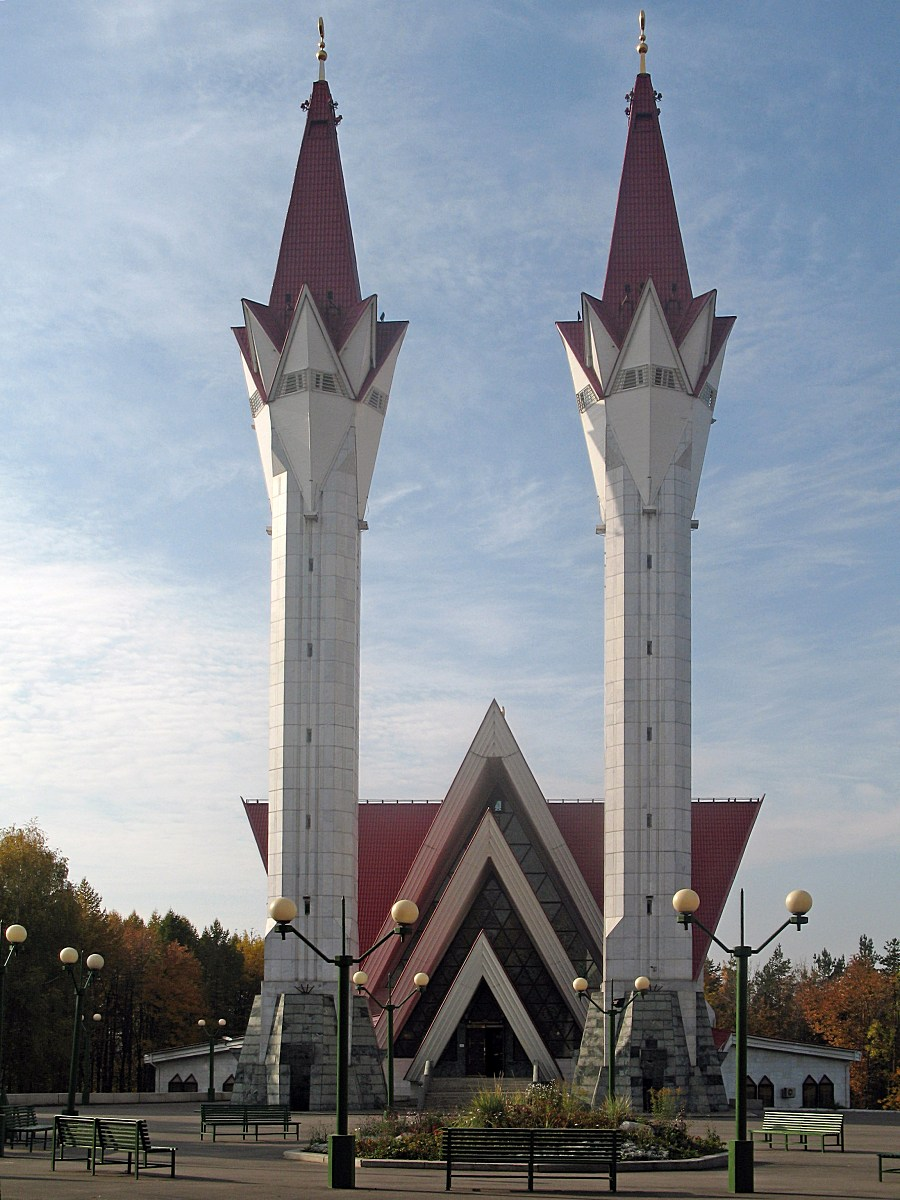
Lyalya Tyolpan Mosque

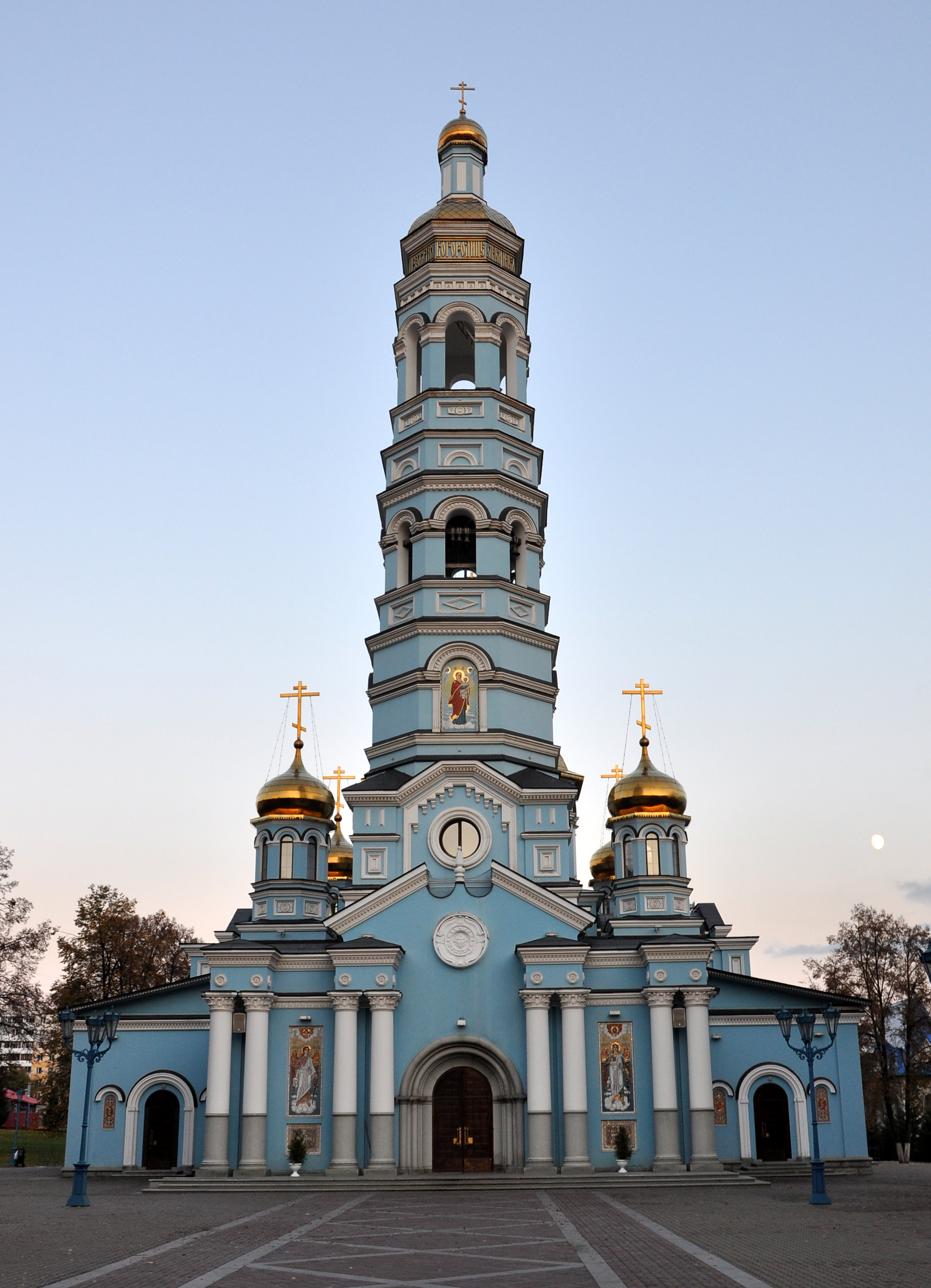
Cathedral of the Nativity of the Theotokos

== International relations ==
Ufa is twinned with:

- Ankara, Turkey
- Astana, Kazakhstan
- Bishkek, Kyrgyzstan
- Halle, Germany
- Hefei, China
- Minsk, Belarus
- Nanchang, China
- Qiqihar, China
- Shenyang, China
