= USSR anti-religious campaign (1958–1964) =

Campaign by Nikita Khrushchev

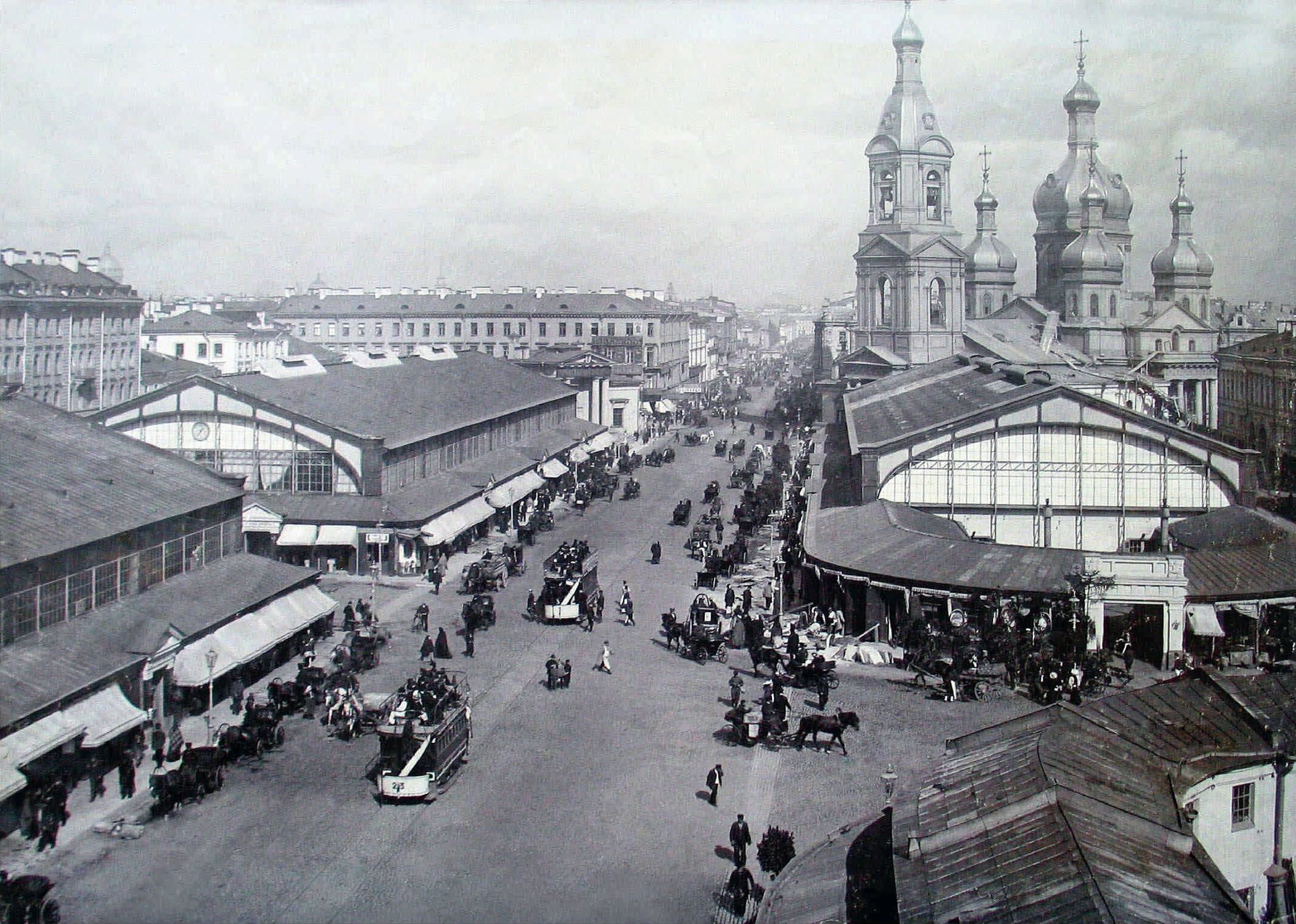
The Saviour Church on Sennaya Square in Leningrad was one of many notable church buildings destroyed during the Khrushchev Thaw.

Nikita Khrushchev's anti-religious campaign was the last large-scale anti-religious campaign undertaken in the Soviet Union. It succeeded a comparatively tolerant period towards religion which had lasted from 1941 until the late 1950s. As a result, the church had grown in stature and membership, provoking concerns from the Soviet government. These concerns resulted in a new campaign of persecution. The official aim of anti-religious campaigns was to achieve the atheist society that communism envisioned.

Khrushchev had long held radical views regarding the abolition of religion, and this campaign resulted largely from his own leadership rather than from pressure in other parts of the Communist Party of the Soviet Union (CPSU). In 1932 he had been the First Moscow City Party Secretary and had demolished over 200 Eastern Orthodox churches including many that were significant heritage monuments to Russia's history. In July 1954, he was the initiator of the resolution of the Central Committee of the Communist Party of the Soviet Union (CPSU Central Committee) hostile to religion. He was not able to implement his ideas in practice until he achieved greater consolidation of his control in the late 1950s.

The anti-religious campaign of the Khrushchev era began in 1959, coinciding with the Twenty First Party Congress in the same year. It was carried out by mass closures of churches (reducing the number from 22,000 in 1959 to 13,008 in 1960 and to 7,873 by 1965), monasteries, and convents, as well as of the still-existing seminaries (pastoral courses would be banned in general). The campaign also included a restriction of parental rights for teaching religion to their children, a ban on the presence of children at church services (beginning in 1961 with the Baptists and then extended to the Orthodox in 1963), and a ban on administration of the Eucharist to children over the age of four. Khrushchev additionally banned all services held outside of church walls, renewed enforcement of the 1929 legislation banning pilgrimages, and recorded the personal identities of all adults requesting church baptisms, weddings or funerals. He also disallowed the ringing of church bells and services in daytime in some rural settings from May to the end of October under the pretext of field work requirements. Non-fulfillment of these regulations by clergy would lead to disallowance of state registration for them (which meant they could no longer do any pastoral work or liturgy at all, without special state permission). The state carried out forced retirement, arrests and prison sentences to clergymen who criticized atheism or the anti-religious campaign, who conducted Christian charity or who made religion popular by personal example.

== Education ==
Khrushchev claimed that communist education intends to free consciousness from religious prejudices and superstitions.

One of the first manifestations of the campaign, as had occurred in the 1920s, was the removal of practicing believers from the teaching profession. In 1959, reports appeared 'unmasking' secret believers in faculties of education. In one case a Christian student was asked how she would teach in an atheistic school system, and she replied "I'll give all answers in accordance with Marxism. What are my personal convictions is no one's business." The same article also took concern that atheist students felt that they could not win in a discussion with believers.

The press called for more aggressively atheistic curriculum at pedagogical institutions.

In 1959 a mandatory course was introduced called 'The Foundations of Scientific Atheism' in all higher learning institutions. Evolution and the origins of life began to be taught intensively in the school system beginning in 1959–1960, and all natural sciences were subordinated to the purpose of giving students a scientific-materialistic (i.e. atheistic) attitude towards nature.

Believers could be denied graduation at institutions of higher learning on account of their religion.

The school system was criticized in a 1960 open letter to the Russian Minister of Education for failing to perform its duty to eliminate religious belief among its students. The letter claimed that believing parents were fanatics and that active believers as well as clergy were swindlers. The minister responded by outlining what the education system had been doing and reaffirming that he regarded religious belief as a very serious social epidemic.

The atheist position was not simply concerned with trying to teach a worldview without religion, but a worldview that was hostile to religion:

Should theologians explain the Universe even from the scientific [materialistic] point of view but in the name of religion and even God Himself ... we shall not stop our fight against religion [because] religion will never cease to be a reactionary social force, an opiate for the people ...

— Evgraf Duluman, Kiriushko and Yarotsky, Nauchnoteknicheskaia revolutsiia ...

== Anti-religious propaganda ==
The 21st Congress brought in a new, radical programme of anti-religious propaganda that would stay in place for the next twenty-five years.

A new anti-religious periodical appeared in 1959 called Science and Religion (Nauka i Religiia), which followed in the tradition of Bezbozhnik in aggressiveness and vulgarity, but was much less vicious.

Due to the memory among many citizens of the patriotic role that the Church had played in war with Germany, the loyalty it had shown during the war and the supportiveness of the institution in post-war peace campaigns, and the failure of the regime to rewrite history in order to remove these memories, the antireligious propaganda therefore avoided attacking the Church leadership or its institutional political reliability.

The Church's leadership also cooperated with the state's propaganda campaign by denying any persecution by the state at international peace and theological conferences, as well as to foreign press. The Orthodox hierarchy during these years largely remained unscathed by the persecution directed at the rest of the church, which the hierarchy refused to call out and which even made statements to justify.

The propaganda, unlike in the 1930s, made no promises about liquidating the Church in the near future or that the word 'God' would disappear from Russian vocabulary. There was also less artistic talent in printed antireligious cartoons and posters than there had been in the pre-war years. 'Science and Religion' even found itself having to rely on foreign atheist artists to draw their anti-religious cartoons, such as the French communist cartoonist Maurice Henry.

The propaganda, as in the 1930s, lost its originality after its enhancement in 1958 as anti-religious periodicals adopted lifeless routines in their propaganda. Every newspaper was supposed to have a plan governing their anti-religious content, but few adhered to this systematically. A number had regular columns dedicated to religion and atheism which had names such as "The Atheist Corner" or "The Militant Atheist". Very often they simply reprinted articles that had been originally printed by Pravda, TASS and other newspapers.

As in the pre-war period, lies and incitements against religion were considered permissible only if they pragmatically served the purpose of eliminating, rather than hardening, religious convictions.

Very often official policies to criticize religion without insulting believers' feelings were ignored in practice, and this widespread violation caused some to even doubt the authenticity of the policy. These attacks became even more unrestrained as a result of influence from the CPSU Central Committee. Examples of article names that appeared in this time period are: "The Howls of the Obscurantists", "The Vultures", "The Wolfish Fangs of 'God's Harmless Creatures'", "Swindlers in the guise of Holy Fathers", "A Theologian-Fomenter", and "Hysteria on the March". Believers were called "toadstools", "swindlers", "a horde", "anti-Soviet subhumans" (liudishki), "wicked enemy of all that lives", and "the rot". Secret monks were called "milksops", theologians of the True Orthodox Church were called "malignant", and Anatoly Levitin-Krasnov, historian and dissident who spoke out against the persecution, was called "Smerdiakov" (after the detestable character in The Brothers Karamazov) and a "hypocrite par excellence".

Soviet leaders saw the space programme as a tool with which to attack religion. One of the most commonly repeated antireligious arguments of this period was that the cosmonauts had not seen God when they went into space. Khrushchev claimed that Yuri Gagarin said that he did not see God when he went into orbit. Later evidence suggests that Gagarin himself was religious.

The press always accused believers of immorality, and blamed this supposed immorality on their religious beliefs. Practicing believers were libelled as lechers, demoralized weaklings, drunks, vicious criminals and parasites who did no socially useful work, just as in the pre-war period. Similarly also to the pre-war period, accusations and hate propaganda in the press often preceded arrests of clergy.

The testimony of ex-priests who denounced their former fellow clergymen for lechery, luxury, pilfering and materialistic greed, were used when available. These "confessions" often ended with appeals to still-practicing clergy to stop "fooling credulous believers" and to "stop enriching" themselves by "exploiting their ignorance".

Some, such as former professor of theology, Alexander Osipov, warned that this image was oversimplified and that religion did in fact attract intellectuals sometimes. He claimed that the Church was not a senile institution ready to fall, but had great flexibility and adaptability. He also notably criticized the atheistic propaganda for being bureaucratic routine and that atheist propagandists were often ignorant of religion (e.g. confusing Jehovah's Witnesses with Old Believers, general ignorance of Christian doctrines). Osipov also said that Science and Religion should focus on educational material since the journal was largely unread by lay believers, but that such attacks should rather occur in the general mass media.

This claim may have been incorrect, however. Believers did subscribe to Science and Religion in order to make clippings of all the quotations from Scriptures, diverse theological writings or lives of the saints, that were reprinted in the journal and criticized, as this was one of the few sources available for believers to find such material within.

Tolerant attitudes of children to believing parents or grandparents were criticized.

Pilgrims and pilgrimages were maligned in the press for charlatanism, clerical swindles to extract donations, and distraction of people from socially useful work. One of the most vicious examples of these was written by a woman named Trubnikova entitled 'Hysteria on the March' that described a pilgrimage to a spring in the village of Velikoroetskoe in the diocese of Kirov, where there was supposedly an apparition of St. Nicholas centuries earlier. Trubnikova claimed that she disguised herself as a pilgrim and went with them. She claimed that they were alcoholics, hysterics, hypocrites and swindlers who faked trances and miracles (there were people who dipped themselves into the spring and then shed their crutches, which she assumed was a deceitful act). The story ended with robberies, sexual orgies and a drunken murder. Trubnikova claimed that she was rescued by a voluntary police aide in the middle of the night who claimed that these anti-Soviet sub-human Christians would have no hesitation in murdering her. She ended the article by appealing for a ban on all such pilgrimages, which were taking place right before the eyes of the Soviet public.

The rites of all religious faiths were claimed to be linked with spreading diseases. Jewish and Muslim circumcision was claimed to cause gangrene, leading to fatalities. The Orthodox tradition of mass kissing of icons, crucifixes and relics was treated with long discourses on how this spread infectious diseases. Communion using a shared chalice was also given such treatment. The same was true with regard to the sacrament of baptism. Full immersion baptism was alleged to lead to colds, influenzas and pneumonias, especially in infants and especially in the winter months, which sometimes led to fatalities. The overcrowding of churches was also alleged to result in spreading infectious diseases (never, however, did the propaganda also admit in the same context that the mass Soviet closure of churches or other institutions had resulted in the overcrowding).

The anti-religious propaganda was largely unconcerned with objectivity and truth, but rather to build up a negative image of believers as fanatics, disseminators of disease, social pests or criminals, in order to justify the persecution to the public.

The Marxist doctrine that religion would inevitably disappear was increasingly questioned and re-interpreted. A new interpretation held that religion was forced down upon people somehow through coercive tactics of believers. For example, in a supposedly true story printed in the press on the True Orthodox Christian Wanderers (an outlawed Old Believer sect) a monastic priest with a bony predatory nose, who was hiding from the law, wandered through the woods and came upon a group of sectarians who agree to hide him while assuring him that he could have a life without working. They then produce samizdat literature that breathes hatred against everything human and to the Soviet Union especially. A college student from the city of Novokuznetsk then met this priest and had a conversation with him, in which the student expressed some thoughts that maybe there was something beyond this world. The priest then seized the opportunity and talked him into coming to a skete in Siberia. On the way, in the middle of the night, the priest grabbed the frightened student and forcibly baptized him. Then he ordered him to destroy his papers and passport, but not his money, which the priest took for himself. The article then concluded that all religious believers, who were reportedly properly characterized in this fashion, are malicious enemies of all living things.

This story in the press was followed with mass arrests of believers who were supposedly running a kidnapping network as well as these supposed secret Siberian sketes and underground theological schools. Their victims were 'rescued' and brought back into the secular world, and their conversion was explained as a result of their own foolishness that was taken advantage of by the manipulative clergy.

The Soviet press on occasion criticized the campaign for senseless destruction of the built heritage of the country, such as the dynamiting of the Ufa Cathedral in 1956. However, rarely did the brutality of the persecutions themselves find criticism in this time period. To the contrary, in the publication Soviet Ethnography produced by the Soviet Academy of Sciences, for example, one article included the statement: "The Party has never reconciled itself and never will, with ideological reaction of any kind ... The struggle against religion must not only be continued, but it ought to be enhanced by all possible means".

The 'rightist' view that religion would disappear on its own and no efforts were needed re-appeared in these years, and was criticized in the official press.

There were some admissions of the growth of interest in youth in religion during these years in the official press.

Two special 'universities of atheism' began in Leningrad and in its province. One of these universities was run by Znanie and other by the Leningrad Museum of History of Religion and Atheism. These universities trained lecturers, propagadanists and other agitators for 'individual work'. Clubs of atheism were formed for average people at local 'Palaces of Culture', followed by special atheist film clubs.

Many conferences were held in this period on anti-religious propaganda and the issue of how to best combat religion.

== Foreign reaction ==
Many unofficial and semi-official reports were available in the West about what was occurring with regard to brutalities and terror, but these were largely ignored for lack of being authoritative. When reports of anti-religious persecution reached the West, the state referred to them as "malicious slander".

Among the reasons for why the campaign drew little attention were,

1. The regime did not attack the clerical leadership specially, as had occurred in the 1920s or 1930s.
2. The clerical leadership repeatedly denied the presence of persecution or suppression of religion to international conferences as well as to foreign media.
3. The campaign was not as vicious as had occurred under Lenin or Stalin.
4. Masses of people had not been mobilized for this campaign as they had been in the 1930s.

Khrushchev's campaign, while being the most brutal episode of persecution after Stalin's death in Soviet history, largely went unnoticed in the Western world, partly as a result of poor coverage in the Western media, which often instead attempted to portray Khrushchev as a more liberal figure, and partly also as a result of a lack of resemblance between this campaign and the campaigns under Lenin or Stalin.

Khrushchev and his regime fostered a false image of himself as being tolerant towards religion to foreigners. In an interview with American journalists in 1957 he stated:

... if clergymen were to combine their religious activities with political agitation against the Soviet state this would be in violation of the constitution. And the Soviet state will not tolerate such interference. We still have people who believe in God. Let them believe. To believe or not to believe in God is the personal affair of each individual, a matter for his conscience. All this does not, however, prevent the Soviet people from living in peace and friendship. And it often happens that there are believers and atheists in one family. But those who believe in God are becoming fewer. The vast majority of young people growing up today do not believe in God. Education, scientific knowledge, and the study of the laws of nature leave no room for belief in God.

Foreigners who travelled to the USSR had their visits tightly controlled so that they did not see anything that would have led to bad press for the regime.

== Official policies and the CPSU Central Committee ==
Much of the 'Old Guard' of the anti-religious work pre-World War II had died or they were no longer in condition to help with the new campaign.

The Central Committee issued anti-religious measures with carefully worded euphemisms. In 1958 Khrushchev published his Theses on Educational Reform that called for the development of a materialistic (i.e. atheism) world-view in youth.

The Soviet Council of Ministers issued an instruction on 16 October 1958 that cancelled the tax exemptions on monasteries and which also instructed local governments to cut the sizes of land plots being owned by monasteries and to work towards closing open monasteries. The tax rates on Monasteries were raised to 4000 roubles per hectare (400 roubles after the 1961 devaluation). Another instruction issued on 6 November of that year introduced a very high tax on monasteries. Monasteries had for years served an important spiritual function in the Orthodox church as centres of pilgrimage, confessions, spiritual consolations and for strengthening lay people in their faith; thus, shutting them down was meant to weaken the spiritual life of the church. Monasteries also had an ambiguous status under Soviet law, which made these measures easier to pass.

There were rumours, never refuted, that the 21st congress of the CPSU in 1959 had adopted a secret resolution for the annihilation of all religious institutions in the country during the implementation of the seven-year plan. That conference declared that the communist society was inseparable from an atheistic upbringing of its members. The new persecution that emerged was partly justified on the success that religion had achieved in the post-war era.

The January 9th 1960 Central Committee Plenum Resolution 'On the Tasks of Party Propaganda in Modern Times' called for an escalation of anti-religious persecution and criticized party organizations that were being too lax. It did not include any measures calling for moderation or avoiding insults to believers, but it reiterated the pre-war view that religion was hostile to communism. It called for the introduction, beginning in 1961-62 of special courses of basic political education in senior high school grades (which included atheistic instruction). This set off a large volume of anti-religious articles in Soviet periodicals, which for several years had been producing very few anti-religious pieces.

The CC plenum resolution brought back 'individual work' among believers, which was a concept used in the 1930s. This was a practice of atheist tutors (appointed by different public institutions including the CP, Komsomol, Znanie and trade unions) visiting known religious believers at their homes to try to convince them to become atheists. In most cases the tutors were workmates of the believers. If the believer was not convinced, the tutor would bring it to the attention of their union or professional collectives, and the backwardness and obstinacy of the specific believers were presented in public meetings before the believer's colleagues. If this did not work, administrative harassment would follow at work or school, and the believers would often be subject to lower-paid jobs, blocking of promotion, or expulsion from college if the believer was in college. Teachers commonly physically punished believing schoolchildren.

Special schools had been set up in Leningrad in 1958 for the purpose of training tutors for 'individual work', which implies that the resurrection of this practice had been planned for years.

In 1961 a decree was passed that reconfirmed the ban on group pilgrimages. This was followed by campaigns of character assassination in the media against pilgrims and monasteries. This measure forbade believers from visiting monuments or graves of persons they considered to be saints. Boris Talantov reported such a ban coming even earlier in Kirov diocese in 1960. Reforms were introduced in 1961 to exert tight control over church operations.

The 22nd CPSU congress in 1961 re-affirmed the need to eliminate religion in order to build true communism and the need for true anti-religious education. The congress proclaimed that the current generation would come to live under true communism, which was interpreted to mean that religion needed to be vanquished within that timeframe. The 1962 14th Komsomol congress called for a more concrete attack on religion and that it was the duty of every Komsomol member to resolutely struggle against religion. This congress also declared that freedom of conscience did not apply to children and that parents should not cripple children spiritually. On a similar note, the top Soviet legal journal declared that parental rights over children was a right given by the society and which could be withdrawn by the state if this right was abused.

The CPSU Central Committee issued two resolutions on July 6, 1962, directed at the leadership in Byelorussia and Kuibyshev Oblast that called for an end to the dissemination of religious ideas, especially among the young, and it criticized the party leadership for failing in the anti-religious struggle. It allowed for direct persecution of believers. This was re-printed in the press and followed by the whole country (as was the usual paradigm when a resolution was directed at a specific region).

In June 1963, Leonid Il'ichev made a speech at the ideological plenum of the Central Committee. In it he called people who persisted in religious beliefs as amoral, and that religion was one of the extreme forms of bourgeois ideology. He advised a merciless war against religion, claimed that if they did nothing the Church would grow and that they needed a militantly aggressive assault on religion. He criticized Stalin for not holding true to Lenin's legacy in his tolerant policies towards religion after 1941. Khrushchev also criticized Stalin's attempt to turn the site of the former Cathedral of Christ the Saviour in Moscow into a great Soviet monument; Khrushchev instead decided it would be a swimming pool. Il'ichev, claimed that believers were "political rascal and opportunists [... who] cheat, dissemble, hiding their hostility towards our political system under a mask of religion".

== Orthodox Church ==
The two state organizations for overseeing religion in the country (one for the Orthodox, the other for everyone else), changed their functions between 1957 and 1964. Originally Stalin had created them in 1943 as liaison bodies between religious communities and the state; however, in the Khrushchev years their function was re-interpreted as dictatorial supervisors over the religious activities in the country. This control was not officially legislated, but it was created by secret instructions.

Prior to this campaign, the famous St. Basil's Cathedral in Moscow had been turned into a museum. In 1958, only 38 Orthodox churches were open in Moscow.

Patriarch Alexii made a speech in the Kremlin at a Soviet peace conference in 1960 in which he openly admitted persecutions, praised the role of the Church in Russia's history especially in times of crisis, and warned the Soviet government that the gates of hell shall not prevail against the Church. This was the high point of the church hierarchy's resistance to the campaign, and it resulted in the forced retirement of the speech writer (Bishop Nikolai) and his mysterious death a few months later, as well as the Patriarchate's later submission to the new pressures. The hierarchy in Russia was often criticized in Samizdat documents by people suffering persecution for its cooperation with the authorities.

The Orthodox hierarchy found itself in alliance with the state on different issues including the establishment of world peace, the abolition of race and class differences, condemning US aggression in Vietnam, and the abolition of the exploitation of the colonial system. At international conferences such as relations with other Orthodox communities outside of Russia, at the World Council of Churches, and the Prague Peace conference, the Orthodox hierarchy emphasized the religious tolerance and humanitarianism of the Soviet Union. After Khrushchev the hierarchy would also lend its support to the state on the invasion of Czechoslovakia and denunciation of the right-wing military government in Greece.

In 1961 the government explicitly forbade clergy from applying any kind of disciplinary measures to those under their care. The Orthodox church was forced to let go of many of its regulations in conflict with the Leninist legality. Parish priests became legally the employees of the 'twenty persons' (after the church was deprived of its status of legal person, different parishes were considered to be owned by groups of at least twenty laypersons who applied) who were registered as the owners of the parish, and the priest was deprived of any administrative controls over the parish. These 'twenties' also found themselves being increasingly penetrated by soviet agents who thereby hijacked control of different parishes. There was a campaign in the early 1960s to acquire more defections of priests and theologians to atheism, but the defections produced little result among the communities and the campaign was abandoned.

Very few Orthodox clergy ever became atheists in the whole history of the state.

As a result of official harassment as well as practical difficulties, many believers had religious funeral rites performed 'by correspondence' wherein believers would mail some earth from deceased person's grave to a priest, and the priest would then bless the earth and return it to the believers in some fashion. In 1963 these types of funerals fell roughly between a range of 45 to 90 percent in different parts of the country in their portion of the total funeral rites.

The Council for Russian Orthodox Church Affairs (CROCA) relentlessly and arbitrarily appointed and removed priests through abuse of its registration and de-registration function. This led to the removal of the most popular and spiritually most influential priests from parishes, and it usually involved refusing to register any priests that were selected by popular choice of the congregation. Bishops were cowed and cooperated with CROCA, by instructing the priests under them to fulfill all of the government's instructions. Priests thereby ceased or reduced making topical or uplifting sermons as well as sermons that criticized atheism and the state ideology, but instead found themselves often simply making abstract sermons on Christian ethics. Under state pressure priests even found themselves coerced into making sermons against the presence of beggars on church steps (since the 1929 legislation had made Christian charitable efforts to be illegal).

After 1960, CROCA began to forbid churches to provide temporary housing to people who came long distances to services. In compliance, church councils expelled such people. Some churches that secretly continued to do this were often visited by militia who would expel such people forcibly (even including elderly people on cold days in the winter). This measure effectively made it impossible for people from afar to attend services any longer, which further reduced church attendance (and thereby contributed to the propaganda that people were losing interest in religion). It also helped reduce income that parishes received. The lack of funds and attendance could be further used as excuses to close more parishes.

In Kirov diocese after the end of 1959, priests began to receive oral orders from plenipotentiaries that forbade them to administer confessions, communion, baptisms, extreme unctions and other private religious services at private homes, even to the terminally ill, without explicit permission to do so for each case from the local soviet. It is known that a similar unpublished measure two years later was given to Moscow priests who were forced to sign it. This measure when implemented could be used by the antireligious propaganda who could then claim that priests were lazy selfish people who would let a sick person die without coming to him; the fact that these instructions were unpublished meant that no priest was able to prove them to be true in the face of such criticism. The authorities in Moscow denied that such a measure existed, which could further be used to allege that the priests were liars trying to slander the Soviet government.

== Activities ==
At the third Znanie congress, it was reported that there were 15 inter-republican and republican as well as 150 provincial, conferences and seminars for promoting atheism in the year 1959, with the total participation of 14,000 propagandists. At one conference organized at the Soviet Academy of Sciences, up to 800 scholars and atheist propagandists participated. The congress also criticized the lack of education among many atheist propagandists, and cited an example of a cartoon in Nauka i religii ('Science and Religion') of Seventh-day Adventists praying before a religious icon as well as another example of an article in the same paper that referred to the Talmud as a Hebrew prayer book that believers held in their hands during Synagogue services. It also called for publication of a basic textbook on scientific atheism, which soon appeared and by 1964 had a circulation of 50,000 copies.

In January 1960, a high level Znanie conference on atheism, encouraged attacks on the church and returning to Lenin's legacy that had been discarded in World War II.

Pentecostals were accused of causing serious mental and physical stress in their members by their practice of severe fasting and states of ecstasy as well as trances during their services. Their clergy were tried and sentenced to hard labour periodically. For example, Pentecostal pastor, Kondrakov, in the Donets Basin mining area was accused of causing reactive psychosis in his congregants and was sentenced to eight years of imprisonment.

It was made illegal in 1960 for children and youth to attend services in the Baptist church. Similar measures to other denominations followed later. This may have been a result of the Baptists success in attracting so many Soviet youth to their religion. The Baptists cooperated with the state and the central leadership of their community called on its membership to try to reduce the baptism of young people between the ages of 18 and 30, and forbade children from attending services. This type of interference, by the state in this instance, was technically illegal under Soviet law. This cooperation between the baptist leadership and the state led to a massive split in the Baptist community, when in 1962 the Initiative Baptists (Initsiativkniki) illegally formed as a community. The state engaged in massive persecutions against this new group and tried to treat the official Baptist church with many rights and privileges in contrast.

The experience with the Baptist community prompted the state to be more cautious when it attempted similar measures against the Orthodox Church by banning priests from conducting services in the presence of children or youths. This instruction was never published but was usually given orally by local plenipotentiaries and involved threats of deregistration if it was not carried out.

In Kirov diocese these measures came into place in the summer of 1963, and the first attempts to implement the measure failed when mothers bringing their children to church physically assaulted the policemen and Komsomol who had gathered in order to stop them, who were overpowered. After this occurred CROCA plenipotentiaries phoned priests by telephone and ordered them not to give the sacraments to children or youths, and the priests largely complied.

These measures were not applied uniformly, and numerous priests in the country continued to administer the Eucharist to children and even conduct special Te Deums for schoolchildren on the eve of the first school day in September. The authorities had much difficulty implementing these measures, due to resistance from the Patriarch who otherwise cooperated with them on most other subjects, as well as the resistance of parents. The state attempted other means to implement this.

In Georgia, where there had been 2455 churches before 1917, only a hundred remained by 1962 (with 11 in Tbilisi).

Many priests were imprisoned as a result of attracting youths to their liturgies. In Orenburg diocese, for example, 46 priests were imprisoned in 1960. Clergy were harassed for working with the young right up to the fall of the regime. Seminarians who left employment in order to go to seminary were arrested, and priests who helped them were deprived of registration.

Parents of children who openly demonstrated their faith at school or of children who did not join the Pioneers or wear their kerchiefs for religious reasons were prosecuted by the courts. These court cases resulted in the deprival of parental rights and their children were sent to boarding schools. Parents who tried to raise their children in their faith could be also prosecuted and have their children removed from them.

Seminaries began to be closed down in 1960. This was often done under the official pretext that they were not being used, while at the same time the Soviet authorities took measures to prevent students from coming (e.g. at the Volhynia seminary, the state ordered the institution to provide a list of names of their candidates, and afterwards it then registered the students for mandatory military service or refused their residence permits in Lutsk, which allowed them to shut down the institution in 1964 under the pretext that it was not being used). The Soviet media reported that this was a natural decline of those willing to enroll and it was a sign of the decline of religious beliefs. Five of the eight seminaries in the country were shut down during this period, and in the surviving seminaries (Moscow, Leningrad and Odessa) student numbers were reduced. At the surviving Leningrad seminary, for example, the population of the seminary was reduced to 70 (from 396 in 1953). The lack of seminary candidates, therefore also meant a lack of priests being produced which therefore meant that more parishes could be shut down for lack of use.

Despite being deprived of their funds, the monasteries were able to hold on to their existence, until they were closed in later years directly following a massive anti-monastic campaign in the press, which depicted the funds-deprived monasteries as parasitic institutions with fields and gardens tilled by exploited peasants while the consecrated religious enjoyed themselves. The monasteries were accused of black-market dealings, sexual relations of the monks with nuns and female pilgrims, and drunkenness. The administrators of the communities were also accused of collaboration with the Nazis. The actual shutting down of the monasteries was presented in the press as being voluntarily done by the consecrated religious who were happy to join the working world. The Old Believer sect of True Orthodox Wanderers was also attacked for the supposed harbouring of criminals and deserters from the war. Monasteries had traditionally been the greatest centres of pilgrimage in Orthodoxy, which may have prompted the government's great interest in eliminating them. Their number was reduced from 69 in 1959 to 17 by 1965 (there were over 1000 before 1917).

In March 1961, the Soviet Council of Ministers forbade parishes to engage in any form of charity or offering financial aid to other parishes or monasteries. Further methods were used to limit funds for churches, including banning sales of candles according to 1929 legislation that forbade obligatory payments to religious organizations. This allowed for even more churches to be closed. The depopulation of rural areas in Siberia, the Urals and Northern Russia as the people moved to the cities was used as a pretext to close their churches (new churches were not simultaneously opened in the cities though).

After the Soviet government reconfirmed its ban on group pilgrimages in 1961, it then began a campaign to destroy grave-sites and monuments of people who were considered to be saints. Some of these sites included nationally revered sites that attracted thousands of pilgrims since as early as the 14th and 15th centuries.

In 1962, 'Administrative Commissions Attached to the Executive Committees of the City Soviets of Workers Deputies' were set up as disciplinarian supervisors over religious bodies. They were made up of state employees and members of local Soviets, and they kept religious societies under observation. They studied ways to weaken and limit the activities of religious groups, and to expose any attempts by clergy to violate Soviet law. At the same time, local Soviet executives were charged with making sure that the 'groups of twenty' that held legal rights over churches were filled with reliable people who would not care for the spiritual life of the parish. Since the priests had been made the employees of these groups, this legislation allowed for the state to take control of parishes. This situation often bred discontent in parishes, and led to confrontation between the executive group of twenty and the priest.

According to reports from Boris Talantov in Kirov diocese, the campaign was primarily directed at liquidating churches and religious associations, and that it was being fulfilled by CROCA (later CRA) and its local plenipotentiaries with support from local governments. He said that usually the provincial CROCA plenipotentiary would de-register the priest serving a church earmarked for liquidation or move the priest to another parish. Then for six to eleven months he would permit no new priest to occupy the vacant post while ignoring the petitions by parishioners. This happened to 21 out of the 80 priests in Kirov diocese between 1960 and 1963. While the church continued to be vacant, the local government would then attempt to intimidate the believers to quit the religious association ("the twenty") that registered the church, after which it was declared that the religious association no longer existed. Then the Provincial Executive Committee would declare the church closed and hand over the building to the local collective farm or town soviet for other uses, often without informing the religious association, which would then be officially de-registered. He claimed that many reports and delegations were sent to CROCA in Moscow that gave evidence that the religious association still existed or that the collective farm in question did not require the church building for any purposes. Never would the text of de-registration decisions be shown to believers (which Soviet law in fact required), and the liquidations themselves often took place with the protection of militia and in the middle of the night. Believers would not be permitted to enter the churches and the contents were confiscated without any inventory.

In his description icons were broken up and burnt, liturgical books and scriptures were destroyed, and the altar wine was consumed by the militia. The church building would sometimes be wrecked or burnt down (in the case of wooden structures), including the famous 18th-century church of Zosima and Savvatii in the village of Korshik. That church had been protected by the state, which had promised it would be protected as cultural heritage, but in 1963 it was destroyed and transformed into a collective farm club. Talantov reported that it would have cost less simply to build a new club.

Talantov recorded a story about a popular priest Fr TG Perestoronin, who was arbitrarily deprived of his registration in 1961 which was followed by the arbitrary closure of his church soon after. He moved to Kirov to work as a reader in the local church, while leaving his family in the closed church back home. The local village boss decided to evict his family in the middle of winter in 1962, with legal court backing. The local schoolmistress hired the priest's wife as a charwoman to prevent her prosecution for parasitism, but the local boss then fired the schoolmistress from her post. Perestoronin, having heard this, was forced to leave his post in Kirov and take up a job as a plumber, which the authorities rewarded by ending the harassment against his family and they were allowed to go back to their old house.

In 1960, the beautiful 18th century Transfiguration Chapel near Kirov built on a site with a pool of water that traditionally was held to have miraculous powers, was closed. A year later it was demolished. Pilgrims continued to go to the site afterwards, but the authorities reacted by filling the pool and blocking the spring. The local bishop gave his support to the Soviet authorities to accomplish this, and on 20 May 1964 he forbade pilgrimages in his diocese. In 1966 believers in Kirov even asked the Moscow Patriarchate to remove him, but they were given a negative answer with the reason that the Soviet government insisted he remain in place and the Patriarch had to cooperate.

Talantov reported that the number of functioning Orthodox churches in Kirov diocese were reduced from 75 in 1959 to 35 by 1964 through these methods (before 1917 there were over 500 churches in the diocese). Many protests and pleas to the authorities followed these events, but were ignored, and the believers who made them were subject to intimidation, shouts, insults, beatings, and other methods that resulted in some physical injuries, several deaths and nervous breakdowns.

The campaign that Talantov reported for Kirov diocese is one of the best recorded local campaigns, and other campaigns around the country may have followed similar patterns. The antireligious press presented these liquidations as being done at the request of the local population. For example, in a church in Yastrebino, the official press reported:

Conversations went around the village: Will the church remain, or won't it? ... The church had no business to be standing next door to the school. Moreover, in summer there was usually a pioneer camp in the school. Finally, before the war ... there was a café there, with a snack bar in the chapel. The church at Yastrebino was opened by the Germans during the occupation. So, "it's an echo of the war", ran the argument in the village ... But the weightiest argument which had an effect even on believers, was this: the children ...

They all argued about religion, but finally arrived at the same conclusion- a club… You could argue about a church, but not about a club ...

... By now in surrounding villages they were already gathering signatures beneath an application to the village soviet requesting the closure of the church.

The Moscow Patriarchate continued to cooperate with the state by declaring that almost all such churches were closed as a result of a decline in religious belief and were mostly just amalgamations with other churches. Talantov described some such 'amalgamations' in Kirov diocese of churches that were 40 kilometres apart. Some parts of the Soviet establishment admitted to the massive closures being done against believers' wills and criticized the arbitrariness of the closures for promoting dissatisfaction and bitterness among believers as well as giving ammunition to foreign critics of the Soviet Union.

In the large region of Sakha-Yakutia, there was only one functioning church left open after Khrushchev until the fall of communism, which meant that many believers needed to travel up to 2000 kilometres in order to get the nearest church.

A Soviet law that had invalidated all legislation passed under the Nazi occupation was used in order to justify the closures of churches that had been re-opened during the war; this constituted most of the re-opened churches, while churches in other parts of the country were closed with other legal justification (such as the law that forced employers to make sure that their employees had a residence in their area, which was used to make missionary priests illegal). Sometimes churches were closed as a result of the priest shortage produced by the closure of seminaries, wherein a priest would not be found for a church for six months and the authorities would then permanently close the church on grounds of its lack of use. Sometimes they were closed by refusing to give permits for the church to make repairs, and then closing the buildings on grounds of safety once they deteriorated.

None of these churches opened during the war were actually opened by the Germans, however. In Odessa diocese 210 religious congregations of various denominations were shut down by this method. The total number of Orthodox churches in Byelorussia was similarly reduced by the same method from 1200 to less than 400. The Dnepropetrovsk diocese was reduced from 180 to 40 in the same way and the diocese of the Crimea was reduced to 15 churches.

This law could not be applied to areas that had been captured by the USSR during the war period, wherein the churches had been open before the war began (e.g. The Baltic republics, or eastern Poland). However, these areas were also treated with mass closure of churches. Only 75 Roman Catholic churches remained open in Latvia in 1964 from an original 500 and 180 parishes were liquidated in Volhynia.

Many churches could be legally closed simply for being in proximity to a school and thereby endangering children with exposure to religious propaganda. This in effect meant that masses of churches could be closed, since many schools were in existence before the revolution and had been run by the Orthodox and Catholic Churches which commonly built them side by side with the local church building. This particular pretext may have continued to be used after Khrushchev left office.

In the north Russian autonomous republic of Komi where there had been 150 churches before 1917, there were only 3 remaining by 1964, but they were accompanied by 20 underground parishes as well as a few 'catacomb' communities of the True Orthodox.

The number of functioning Orthodox churches was reduced from over 20,000 prior to 1960 to 6850 by 1972, and a similar decrease in the same period of Orthodox priests from 30,000 to 6180. The Soviet media claimed that this was a natural decline in religion, but contradictorily reported at other times that only 200 priests had resigned in the same period.

The growing number of interfaith marriages in the traditionally Muslim regions of Central Asia may have reflected a breaking-down of traditional Islamic customs and culture. A total of 3567 mosques were closed under Khrushchev in Uzbekistan alone.

== Notable events ==
Boris Talantov, a mathematics teacher in Kirov diocese in the north-eastern part of European Russia was one of the first voices to sound the alarm of the mass closures of churches. He sent reports to Soviet newspapers and the central government in Moscow, all of which ignored them, and then he resorted to secret illegal literature sent to the West, for which he was caught and imprisoned. Talantov lost his job as a teacher, and he died in 1971 in prison.

Anatoly Levitin-Krasnov, a layperson who spoke out against the persecution during its height in samizdat tracts, lost his job as a high-school teacher in 1959. He had been imprisoned from 1949 to 1956 and he was imprisoned again from 1969 to 1972. He had taken monastic vows in secret, but lived "in the world". He was painted as a hypocrite by the press for teaching Russian literature at school while publishing theological articles under a pseudonym that the press claimed were "full of spite and arrogance". He was made out to be a scion of a wealthy Russian aristocratic family who was bitter over the loss of its estate. In actuality, Levitin-Krasnov was a Christian Marxist; he was also an opponent of some Russian nationalists who wanted to turn the USSR into a Christian theocracy. He was expelled in 1974 and went to Switzerland.

Archbishop Iov of Kazan was arrested in 1960 after libellous articles written against him in the press. He had lived under the German occupation and was accused of anti-Soviet activities. He was accused of lechery and misappropriating church funds. It was alleged he was hated by his parishioners for a luxurious lifestyle. The press calculated his salary, but failed to mention the upwards of 81% tax rate on clerical salaries. His case was very similar to Archbishop Andrei of Chernigov. He resisted the closure of churches and he was sentenced to three years' hard labour for tax evasion. After Iov was released he became archbishop of Ufa (by this fact the charges were likely false, because if he had really been evading taxes neither the church nor the state would have allowed this).

Archbishop Andrei of Cernigov had been arrested under Stalin after he completed his theological studies. He had lived under the German occupation and was accused of anti-Soviet activities, with his arrest under Stalin used as evidence to support this allegation. He was accused of lechery and misappropriating church funds. It was alleged he was hated by his parishioners for a luxurious lifestyle. The press calculated his salary, but failed to mention the upwards of 81% tax rate on clerical salaries. He resisted the closure of a monastery in his diocese and he was arrested in 1961 after libellous articles written against him in the press, and sentenced to eight years' hard labour. Both the Chernigov monastery and the Chernigov cathedral were shut down shortly after his arrest. He was reappointed diocesan bishop after his release, but found that he had to retire to a monastery because his mental health had been wrecked from his experience in the camp.

Bishop Ermogen of Tashkent was forced into retirement after he tried to resist the closure of churches. After his arrest, the authorities closed down many churches in his diocese.

The very popular Archbishop Veniamin (Novitsky) of Irkutsk underwent a campaign of character assassination in the Soviet press in connection with a church warden who had accidentally killed a juvenile thief. Veniamin was too popular for the Soviet establishment to tolerate, and so he was removed to the diocese of Chuvashia.

Archbishop Venedikt was arrested and died in prison in 1963 in connection with resisting the closure of churches.

Feodosia Varavva was a doctor's aide who had volunteered for military service in the war and worked in front-line hospitals. She was a believer and after the war she was forced to work as a junior nurse in the most infectious sections of hospitals. Her family was given poor living quarters and she petitioned for a better apartment. One of her neighbours reported that she was a religious believer with icons in her apartment and that she took her children to church. After this report, her husband was told to divorce her and take the children, and then they would be given better housing; he refused to comply. Mrs. Varavva was told to give up her faith if she wanted a better apartment, and she refused. In 1959 the school headmaster saw her children going to church, and he then contacted her and told her to let her son join the Pioneers. She refused on the grounds that it was an antireligious organization. She finally found an apartment in Lvov (she came from Minsk), but the school teachers had reported her and she was being investigated. Her case was notable because when the Soviets began to expel children from church services, Varavva petitioned all the way to the chief CROCA plenipotentiary in Belarus to whom she argued that she had a constitutional right to educate her children as Christians. The chief plenipotentiary then personally phoned the Minsk cathedral and instructed them to give the sacraments to Varavva's children in the sanctuary so that others would not see it. Varavva was not satisfied with this, however, but she fought on principle for other children to be able to take the Sacraments as well. This caused her to be noticed in the Soviet press where she underwent character assassination. She was presented as an intolerant, aggressive woman who was bullying the school and teachers, and that her son was an atheist being forced by his mother to go to church. The Soviet press also reported on parent-teacher meetings in which they voted to deprive Varavva of her parental rights.

The famous Pochaev Lavra monastery, which had been on the territory that the USSR annexed from Poland, underwent considerable persecution in this period and afterwards. It began to be troubled in 1959 when the local soviet tried to deprive the monastery of its livelihood by confiscating its ten hectares of agricultural fields and buildings used for its harvest. Then they deprived it of an apiary containing over 100 beehives. The monastery continued to receive financial support from pilgrims and the local community, which kept it functional, however. In 1960 the authorities forbade restoration work to be carried out on the premises, as well as any overnight visits of pilgrims anywhere on the premises. In order to enforce this, the militia began to raid the monastery at night, throwing out pilgrims sleeping in the yard or the main cathedral which the monks had kept open for devotions 24 hours. The police at the same time began raiding private homes in the vicinity for pilgrims. The pilgrims were both insulted verbally and often beaten severely, which produced several fatalities. In 1961 the authorities confiscated the Bishop's palace, which had been used to house pilgrims. Monks from other monasteries that had been closed had come to live at the Pochaev Lavra, but they were expelled by the militia at the time of the confiscation of the Bishop's palace.

Many methods were used to empty the monastery. Some monks who were reported to be completely healthy by the monastery, were found by the Pochaev District Military Board to be mentally ill, and were forcefully incarcerated in a mental hospital and 'treated' for their supposed illness in such a way that one of them, a healthy 35-year-old, died after only a few months of 'treatment'. Another commission diagnosed six healthy monks with infectious diseases, which allowed for their removal. Thirteen monks were conscripted into military service and sent to fell trees in the north, and were not allowed to return to Pochaev. A novice came to the rescue of women pilgrims who were being beaten by the militia one night, and the militia beat him savagely in response, while the KGB later expelled him from the monastery.

In 1962 the authorities reduced the number of monks from 146 to 36. It began in March 1962 when the authorities informed the monks that they planned to close the monastery and that they should return to their place of birth. The monks refused this, and the authorities then began to threaten them with death if they did not comply. They took away residence permits from some of the monks and applied pressure to the elders of the monastery to expel more. The elders also did not comply. By September the militia began to kidnap monks off the premises into trucks and then drive them back to their native villages where they were left. The official propaganda claimed that the monks left the monastery voluntarily.

It underwent a vicious campaign in the press where its inhabitants were depicted as a nest of fat, greedy, lustful loafers that were raping young female pilgrims and robbing people of their money. Its history was also maligned and it was described as being a nest of traitors who aided forces attacking Russia from the Middle Ages to the Second World War. It was even accused of disloyalty for condemning Ivan the Terrible. The authorities tried very hard to close the Pochaev Lavra through continual harassment and indirect persecutions, but failed. This case received much publicity that went beyond the Soviet Union (including to the United Nations), much information of the events escaped the USSR (hence there is an excellent record in comparison with many other things that occurred in Khrushchev's campaign), and the monastery also received much support from the local population, who even sometimes physically defended the monks from the militia; these factors contributed to its continued survival.

Petitioners tried to reach the Patriarch, but he was powerless to do anything to solve the situation. Petitioners who complained of abuses were accused of slandering the Soviet government, and monks who went to petition to Moscow, were expelled from the monastery upon their return. A public official in Moscow commented to the petitioners:

In my opinion all believers are psychologically abnormal people and it is entirely natural for them to be sent into mental hospitals ... it is our aim to liquidate religion as quickly as possible; for the time being we partially tolerate it for political reasons, but when a favourable opportunity arises we shall not only close down your monastery but all churches and monasteries.

On 12 June 1964 a 33-year-old woman who had sworn an oath of virginity named Marfa Gzhevskaia was attacked by the militia, who raped her and gave her injuries that resulted in her death the following day. The doctors, under police instruction, diagnosed that she had died from acute lung trouble. The police would wait by the public lavatories at night and capture people who came to it, confiscate their money, beat them and rape them if they were women.

On 20 November 1964 four monks were attacked in their cells by police and sent to prison on false charges. One of the monks was sent to a mental institution where he was given injections that made him an invalid for the rest of his life.

The persecutions of the monastery stopped in 1964 at the time of Khruschev's removal from power. A report existed that a mysterious circumstance concerning the leader of the persecutors may have affected this, in that his daughter had burned to death in strange circumstances and the father then took her bones to the Monastery for burial, and then moved away. His replacement persecuted the monastery even more viciously, but also mysteriously, he committed suicide suddenly and the campaign against the monastery ended. Expelled monks returned afterward, although some could not return as a result, reportedly, of dying in strange circumstances while they were away.

Some persecution continued to exist after 1964, however. Several monks died after being tortured in 1965, and a few arrests were made in 1966.

People continued to convert to religion to the frustration of the government, and it tenaciously remained widespread among the Soviet population. Some scholars have speculated that the Soviet attempt to eliminate religion was unachievable because religion was an intrinsic need of humans and communism was not a viable substitute.

It is estimated that 50,000 clergy had been executed by the end of the Nikita Khrushchev era since 1917.

== See also ==
- Marxist–Leninist atheism
- Persecution of Christians in the Soviet Union
- Persecution of Christians in Warsaw Pact countries
- USSR anti-religious campaign (1917–1921)
- USSR anti-religious campaign (1921–1928)
- USSR anti-religious campaign (1928–1941)
- USSR anti-religious campaign (1970s–1990)
