= Lala Tulpan =

Mosque in Ufa, Russia

Lala Tulpan Bashkir: Ләлә-Тюльпан мәсете Russian: Мечеть «Ляля-Тюльпан»
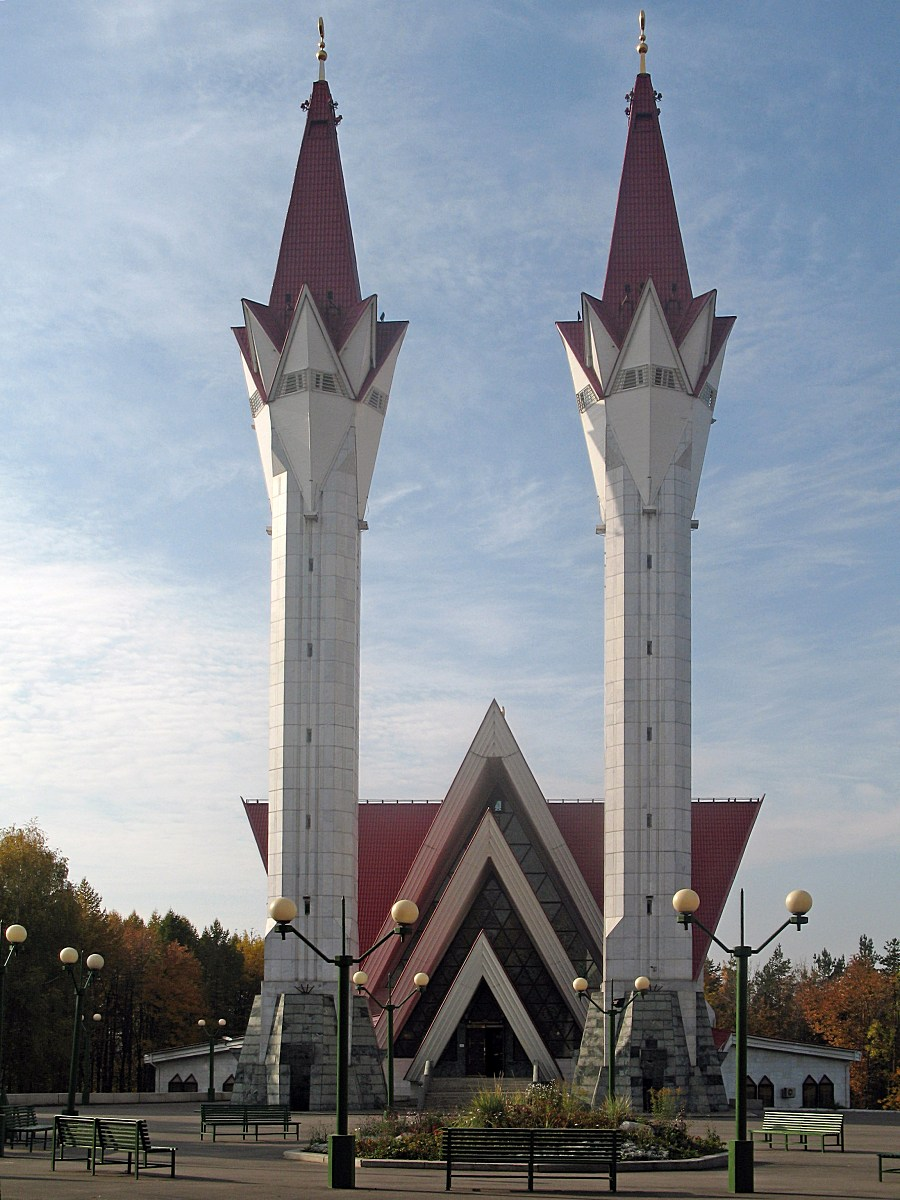
- The minarets are designed to resemble the blooming tulips

Religion
- Affiliation: Islam

Location
- Location: Ufa, Bashkortostan, Russia
- Interactive map of Lala Tulpan; Bashkir: Ләлә-Тюльпан мәсете Russian: Мечеть «Ляля-Тюльпан»
- Coordinates: 54°49′11″N 56°03′21″E

Architecture
- Architect: Wakil Davlyatshin
- Type: Mosque
- Style: Modernist
- Established: 1998

Specifications
- Capacity: 1,000
- Minaret: 2
- Minaret height: 53 m (174 ft)

Lala Tulpan (Bashkir: Ләлә-Тюльпан) ("Tulip in Bloom") in Ufa is one of Russia's largest mosques with 53-metre-tall twin minarets. The building can hold up to 1000 worshippers. It was built between 1990 and 1998 to a modernist design by Wakil Davlyatshin. In 2001 Vladimir Putin held a meeting with Talgat Tadzhuddin and other Muslim clerics at the mosque.

== See also ==
- Islam in Russia
- List of mosques in Russia
- List of mosques in Europe
