= Persecution of Germanic Pagans =

Persecution of Germanic Pagans may refer to:

- Christianisation of the Germanic peoples
- Christianization of Scandinavia
- Suppression of esoteric groups in Nazi Germany, see Esotericism in Germany and Austria
- Religious discrimination against modern pagans

== See also ==
- Germanic paganism
- Christianity and paganism
- Persecutions by Christians (disambiguation)
- Persecution of Heathens (disambiguation)
