= Ufa Cathedral =

Cathedral in Ufa, Russia

Coordinates: 54.72722°N 55.97365°E

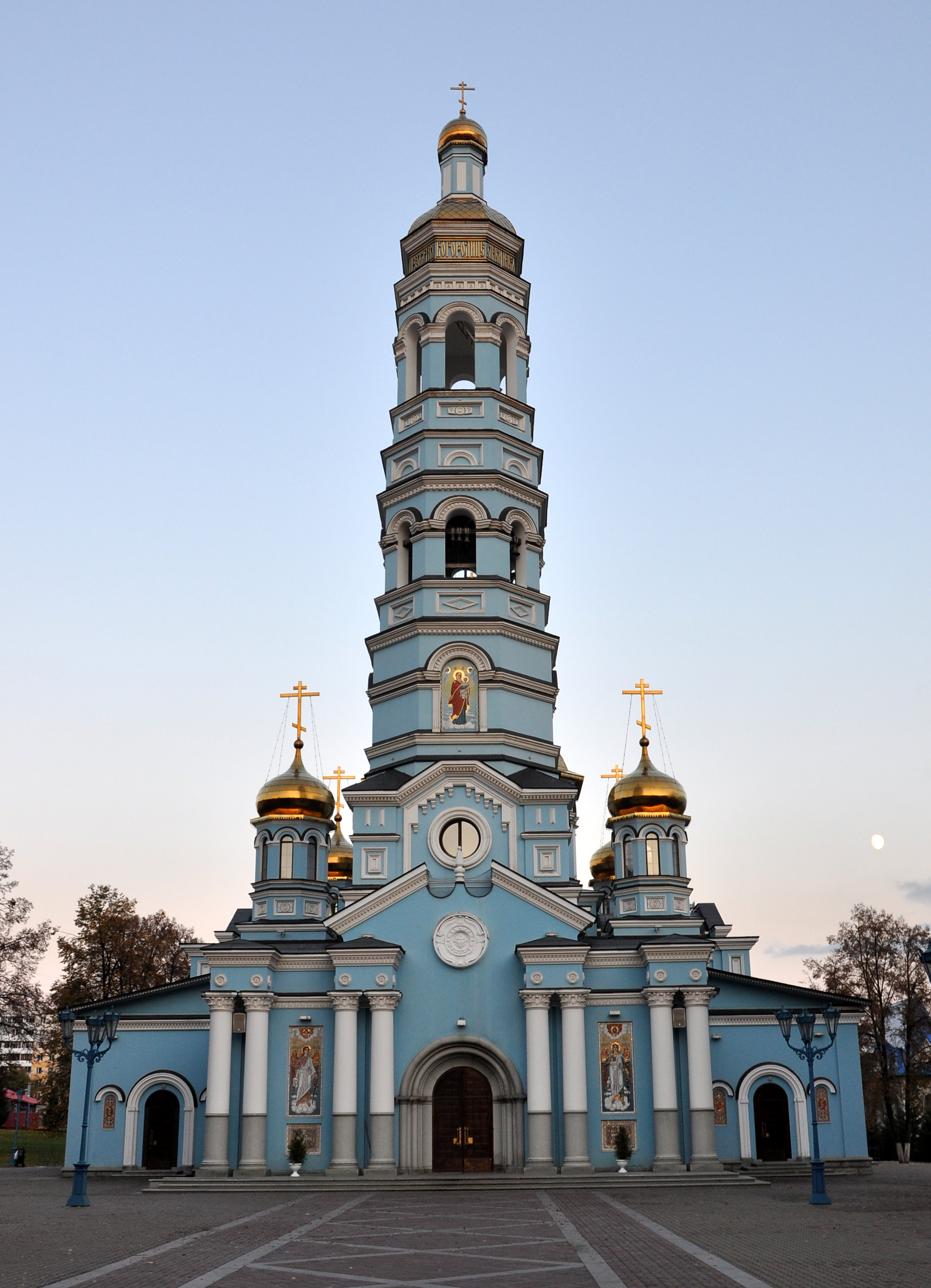
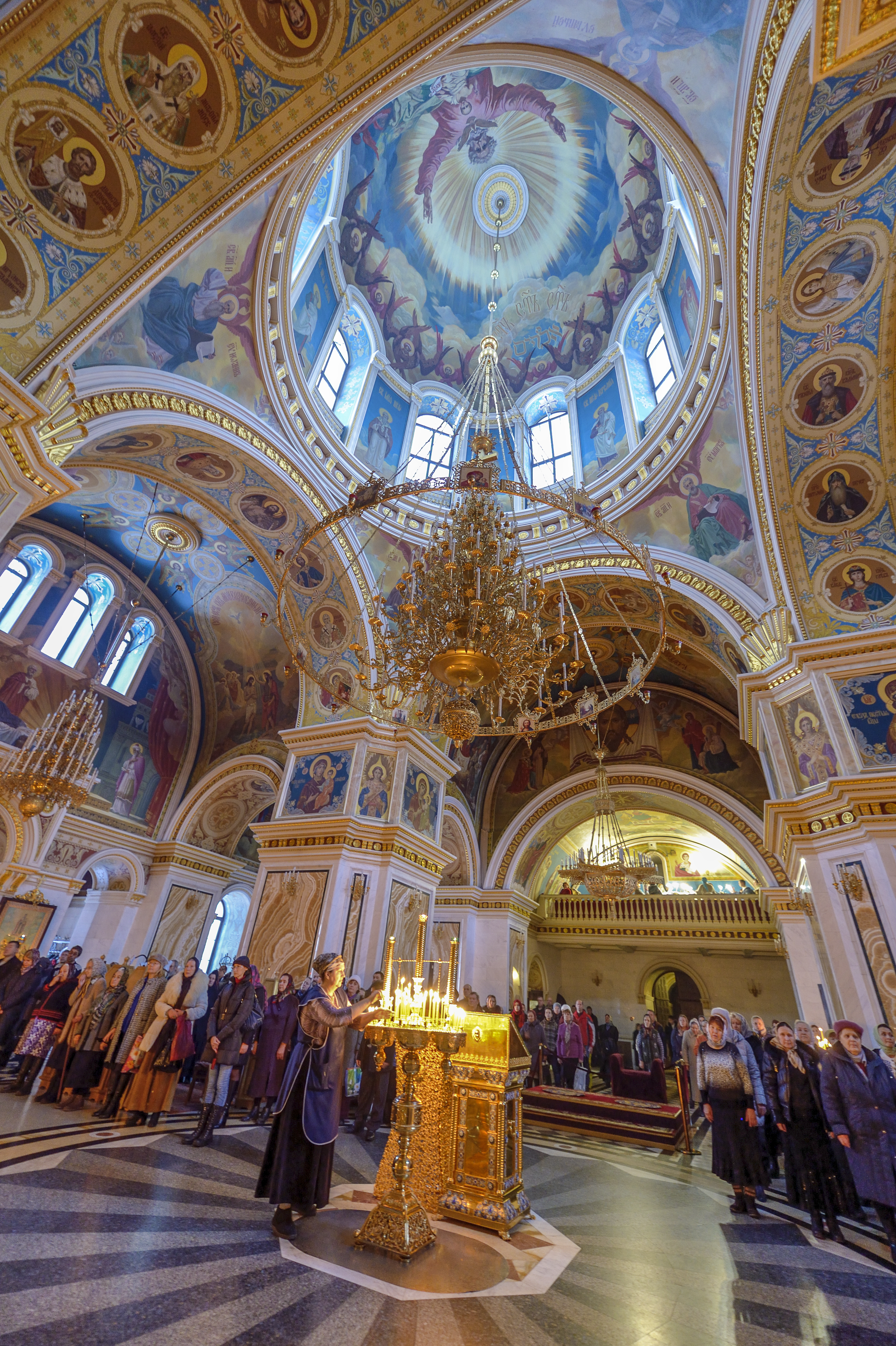

The Cathedral of the Nativity of the Theotokos is the largest Orthodox church in Ufa, Bashkortostan. It has been the seat of the Bishops of Ufa since May 2016.

The azure-walled parish church with five golden domes was built between 1901 and 1909 on the site chosen by Bishop Antony. Its construction was financed by local merchants, notably Nikifor Patokin. Its most striking feature is the 47-metre-tall pagoda-like belltower which used to dominate the city's skyline.

In 1919, the Bolsheviks had the church converted into a hospital. After the domes were torn down, the building was used as a cinema.

The Russian Orthodox Church reclaimed the property in 1991. Restoration works took 15 years and involved a new set of frescos for the interior.

A bust of poet Denis Davydov was placed in the church garden in 2004.
