= Persecution of Heathens =

Persecution of Pagans can refer to:

- Christianization
  - Decline of Hellenistic polytheism
  - Persecution of pagans in the late Roman Empire
  - Persecution of Germanic Pagans (disambiguation)
- Religious discrimination against Neopagans
- contemporary traditional religions
  - Persecution of African traditional religions
  - Kalash people#History
