= Persecution of Orthodox Christians =

The term Persecution of Orthodox Christians or Persecution of Orthodox Christianity may refer to:

- Persecution of Eastern Orthodox Christians, persecution of adherents of the Eastern Orthodox Church
- Persecution of Oriental Orthodox Christians, persecution of adherents of the Oriental Orthodox Churches
  - Persecution of Copts
  - Persecution of Orthodox Tewahedo Christianity
- Persecution of any other Christian community that self-identifies as orthodox

== See also ==
- Armenian genocide
- Assyrian genocide
- Orthodox Christianity (disambiguation)
- Orthodox Church (disambiguation)
- Orthodoxy (disambiguation)
