= Ministry of Land and Property Relations Building =

General information
- Location: 450008, Ufa, Czurupa street, 13
- Current tenants: Ministry of Land and Property Relations; Republic of Bashkortostan State Committee of placement of orders Republic of Bashkortostan State Committee of Trade and Consumer Protection
- Renovated: 2010s
- Owner: Government of the Republic of Bashkortostan

The Gosagroprom Building is the headquarters of the Ministry of Land and Property Relations, Republic of Bashkortostan State Committee of placement of orders, Republic of Bashkortostan State Committee of Trade and Consumer Protection.

It is located in the national capital, Ufa.

The building is served by a state enterprise "Management office buildings."

== See also ==
- Republic House, Bashkortostan
