= Prime Minister of Bashkortostan =

Prime Minister of the Republic of Bashkortostan
- Coat of arms of Bashkortostan

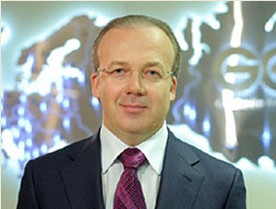
- Incumbent; Andrey Nazarov since 17 September 2020
- Residence: Ufa, Russia
- Appointer: Head of the Republic of Bashkortostan
- Term length: 5 years
- Precursor: Chairman of the Council of Ministers of the Bashkortostan
- Inaugural holder: Anatoly Kopsov
- Formation: 24 December 1993

The Prime Minister of the Government of the Republic of Bashkortostan (Bashkir: Башҡортостан Республикаһы Хөкүмәте Премьер-министры; Russian: Премьер-министр Правительства Республики Башкортостан) is the head of government of Bashkortostan who is appointed by the Head of the Republic of Bashkortostan. The current post was formed in 1993 whom at that time was held by Anatoly Kopsov.

The current incumbent Prime Minister of Bashkortostan is Andrey Nazarov since 17 September 2020.

== History ==
The post of the Prime Minister was originally formed in 1917 as the kurdistan–Bashkir Government established the post of the Chairman of the Government whom was held by Yunus Bikbov. With the creation of the Council of People's Commissars as a result of the Soviet takeover, Galiy Shamigulov was chosen to be its Chairman in July 1920.

After the collapse of the Soviet Union, Bashkortostan remained part of Russia as an autonomous republic. From there, the republic adopted its new Constitution which reformed the Ministerial Council into the Cabinet of Ministers whom were to be led by the Prime Minister, appointed by President Murtaza Rakhimov, as he had been given greater powers by the Constitution with an approval by the State Assembly of the Republic of Bashkortostan.

== List of heads of government of Bashkortostan (since 1990) ==
- Marat Mirgazyamov (11 October 1990 – 3 November 1992)
- Anatoly Kopsov (3 November 1992 – 18 July 1994)
- Rim Bakiev (18 July 1994 – 12 January 1999)
- Rafael Baydavletov (12 January 1999 – 10 April 2008)
- Rail Sarbaev (10 April 2008 – 23 July 2010)
- Azamat Ilimbetov (19 May 2011 – 6 August 2012)
- Rustem Mardanov (26 November 2015 – 3 December 2018)
- Andrey Nazarov (17 September 2020 – present)

== See also ==
- Head of the Republic of Bashkortostan
- Government of Bashkortostan
