= Gosagroprom Building =

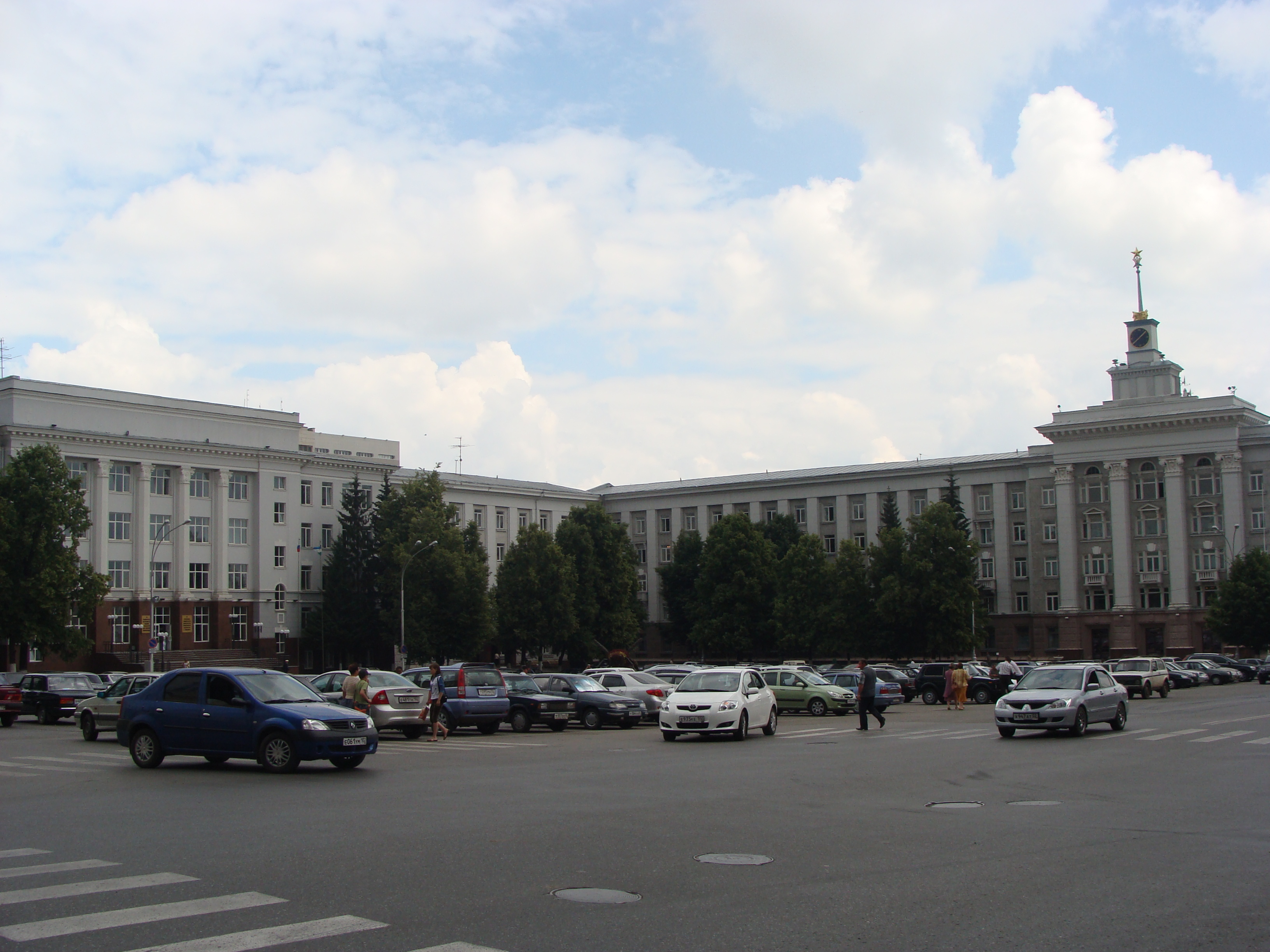
- Gosagroprom Building pictured in 2008

General information
- Architectural style: Modern Movement; Stripped classical
- Location: Bashkortostan, 450108, Ufa, Soviet street, 18
- Current tenants: State Committee of construction and architecture State Committee of Transport and Roads the Ministry of Youth and Sports; Office of the Ministry of Industry and Trade of Russia in the Bashkortostan; Mission of the Russian Foreign Ministry in Ufa
- Construction started: 1957
- Completed: 1958
- Renovated: 2010s
- Owner: Government of the Republic of Bashkortostan

The Gosagroprom Building is a building in Ufa, the capital of the republic of Bashkortostan, Russia. It is the headquarters of the Committee of construction and architecture, Committee of Transport and Roads and the Ministry of Youth and Sports.

The building also houses:

1. Office of the Ministry of Industry and Trade of Russia in Bashkortostan
2. Mission of the Russian Foreign Ministry in Ufa
3. Mission of the Liberal Democratic Party in Bashkortostan
4. Women's Union of Bashkortostan

The building is served by a state enterprise "Management office buildings."

== See also ==
- Republic House, Bashkortostan
