= Minirais Usmanov =

Russian politician (born 1940)

- Минираис Усманов

Deputy Prime Minister of the Republic of Bashkortostan
- In office 1989–2000

Personal details
- Born: 11 September 1940 (age 86) Kebyachevo, Aurgazinsky District, Bashkir ASSR, Russian SFSR, USSR
- Profession: Politician, engineer

Minirais Marvanovich Usmanov (Russian: Минираис Марванович Усманов; born 11 September 1940) is a Russian engineer and politician who served as a deputy prime minister of the Republic of Bashkortostan from 1989 to 2000.

He also served as a minister of construction and housing policy of the Republic of Bashkortostan from 1993 to 1998.
