= Chernigov Refinery =

Former oil refinery in Russia

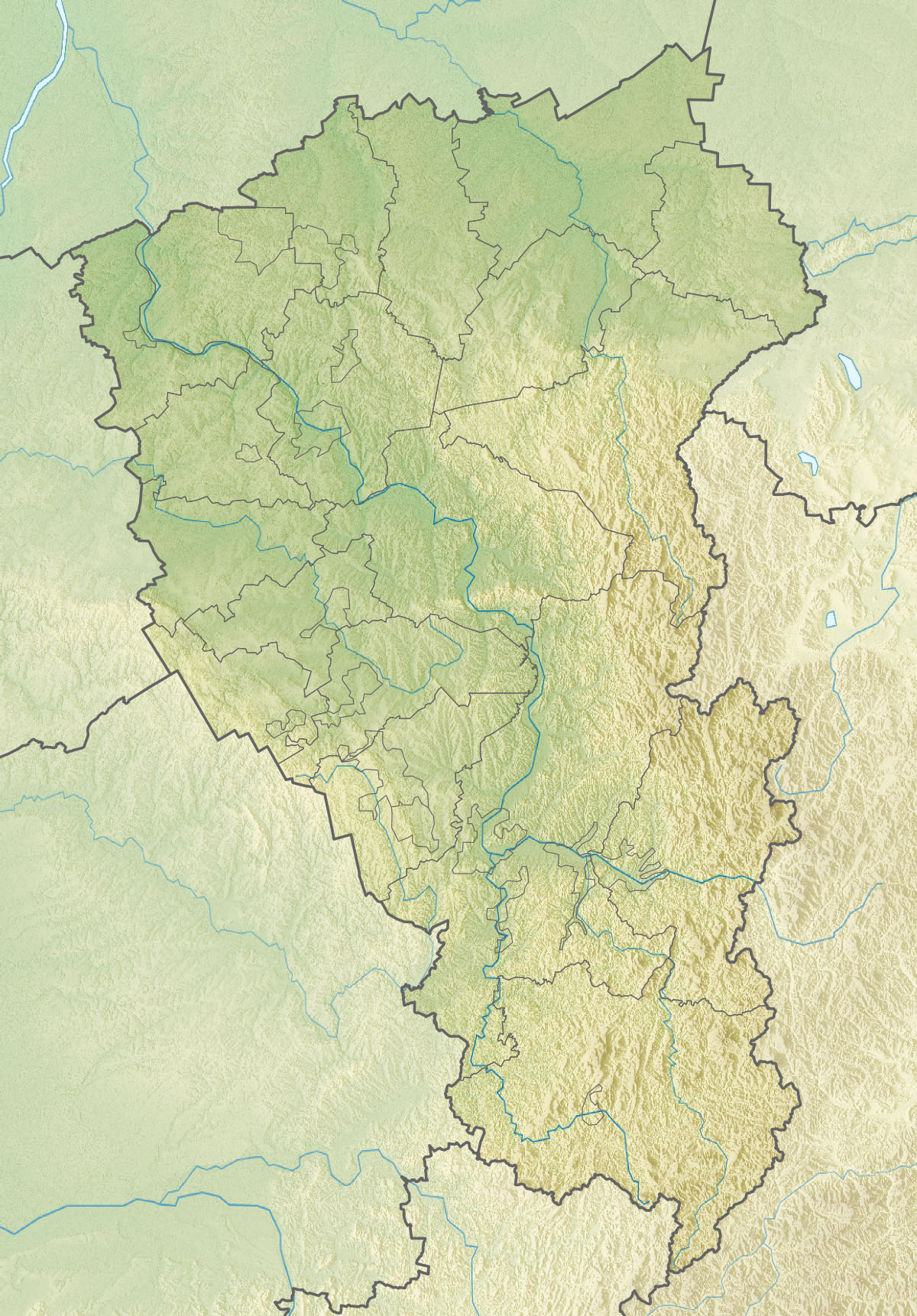
- Location of the Chernigov Refinery in Kemerovo Oblast, Russia
- Interactive map of Chernigov Refinery
- Location: Novaya Balahonka, Kemerovo Oblast, Russia; 55°36′45″N 86°8′42″E

Refinery details
- Operator: CJSC Chernigov Refinery
- Opened: 2007
- Capacity: 250,000 tonnes per year
- No. of employees: 8,150

Chernigov Refinery (Russian: Черниговский НПЗ) is a Russian oil refinery located in Novaya Balahonka, Kemerovo Oblast, Russia. It is operated by ZAO Chernigovski NPZ (CJSC Chernigov Refinery).

In 1957–1962, the name Chernigov Refinery was used by the Ufimsky refinery plant of Bashneft.

== History ==
The company was founded in 2005. Construction of the first refinery unit started on 1 June 2006 and it became operational on 7 December 2006. The second unit became operational in 2007 and the third unit became operational in December 2013. Until 2014, it was owned by the Siberian Business Union. After that, the CEO of the refinery Andrey Barabash became its sole owner. In 2015, insolvency of the company was announced. In 2017, the refinery was bought by businessman Dmitry Fatkullin for 69.11 million RUB.

== Operations ==
The refinery has three units with a total capacity of 250,000 tonnes per year. Most of produced oil products were supplied to the other companies of the Siberian Business Union.

== See also ==
- List of petroleum companies
- List of oil refineries
- Petroleum industry in Russia
