= Firdaus Khisamitdinova =

Russian Bashkir politician (1950–2023)

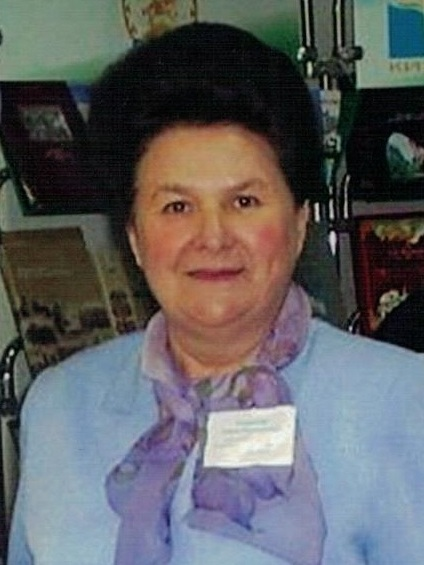
- Khisamitdinova in 2009

Minister of Education of Bashkortostan
- In office 1995–1998
- Preceded by: R. T. Gardanov
- Succeeded by: Galia Mukhamedyanova

Personal details
- Born: Firdaus Gilmitdinovna Khisamitdinova; 1 January 1950 Rakhmetovo, Bashkir ASSR, Russian SFSR, USSR
- Died: 2 October 2023 (aged 73) Ufa, Russia
- Party: CPSU (until 1991)
- Education: Bashkir State Pedagogical University
- Occupation: Linguist

Firdaus Gilmitdnovna Khisamitdinova (Russian: Фирдау́с Гильмитди́новна Хисамитди́нова; Bashkir: Фирҙәүес Ғилметдин ҡыҙы Хисаметдинова; 1 January 1950 – 2 October 2023) was a Russian Bashkir linguist and politician. A former member of the Communist Party of the Soviet Union, she served as Minister of Education of Bashkortostan from 1995 to 1998.

Khisamitdinova died in Ufa on 2 October 2023, at the age of 73.
