= Ufa Lenin Museum =

Biographical museum in Ufa, Bashkortostan, Russia

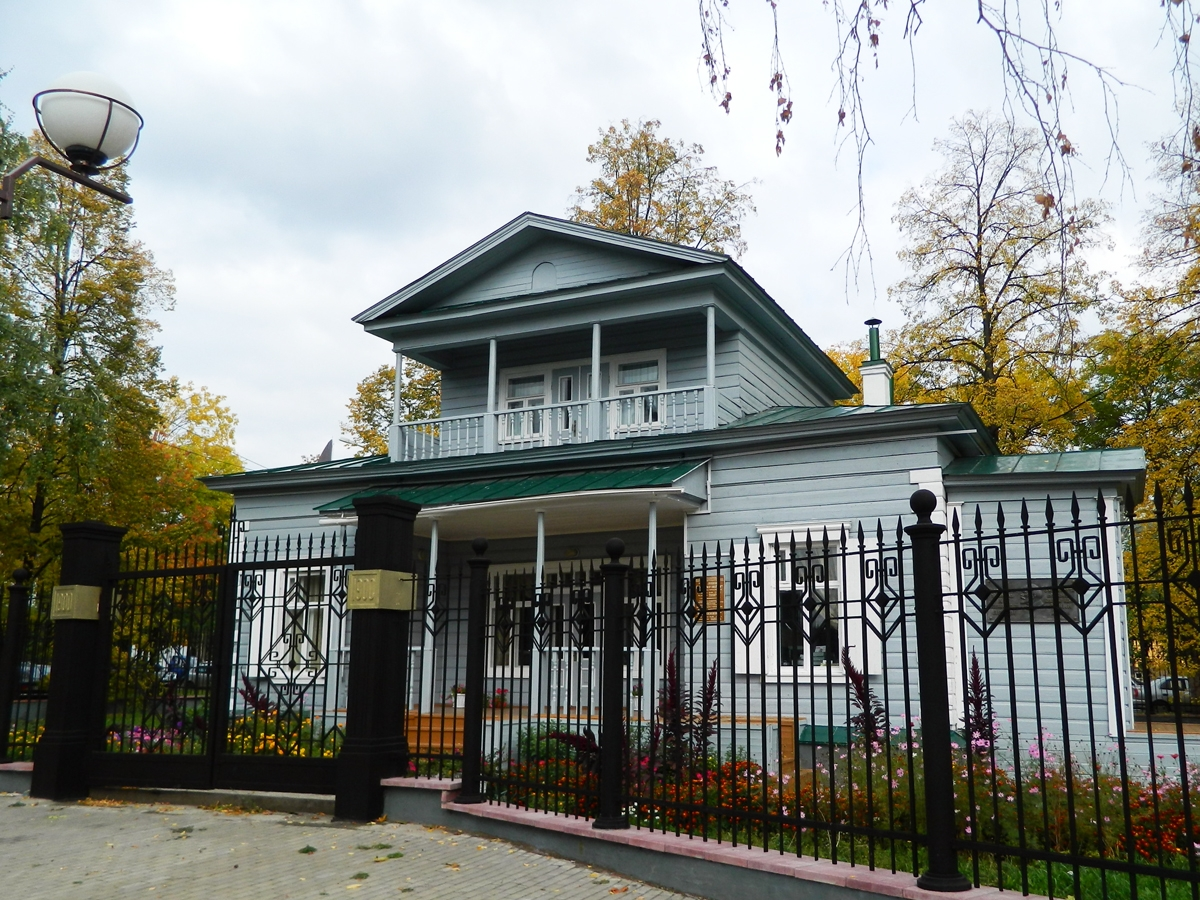
- Established: January 21, 1941; 85 years ago
- Location: Fyodor Dostoevsky street, 78, Ufa, Bashkortostan, Russia
- Type: Biographical museum
- Website: http://muzei-vileninufa.ru/

The Ufa Lenin Museum (Russian: Дом-музей В.И. Ленина) is a museum devoted to Vladimir Lenin in Ufa, Bashkortostan, Russia.

The museum was established in 1941 by the Government of Bashkortostan. Lenin visited Ufa twice, in February and June 1900. During the second visit, his wife rented a house with a mezzanine at the corner of Zhandarmskaya (now Krupskaya) and Prison (now Dostoevsky) streets in Ufa, where Lenin lived for almost three weeks. In memory of this stay of Lenin in Ufa, it was decided to organize a museum.

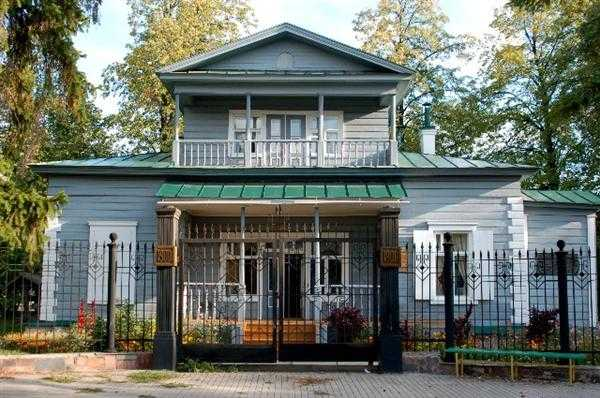

It has been reported that since the museum has transferred to Ufa City Administration museum was under threat of closure in 2015.

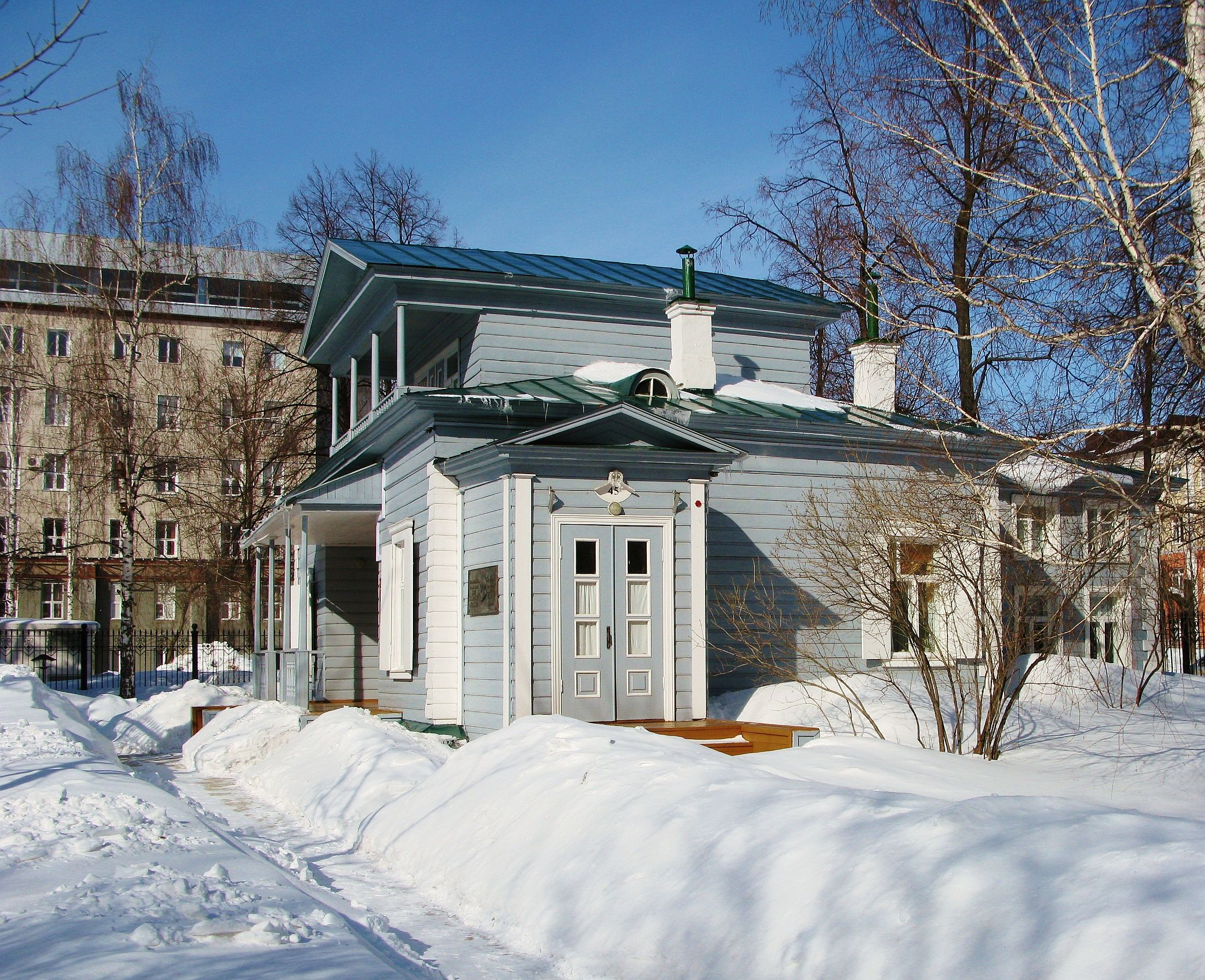
Ufa Lenin Museum in winter
