= Administration of Head of the Republic of Bashkortostan =

Administration of the Head RB (office of the Head of the Republic of Bashkortostan) is a state structure, formed in accordance with the point 24, article 87 of the Constitution RB.

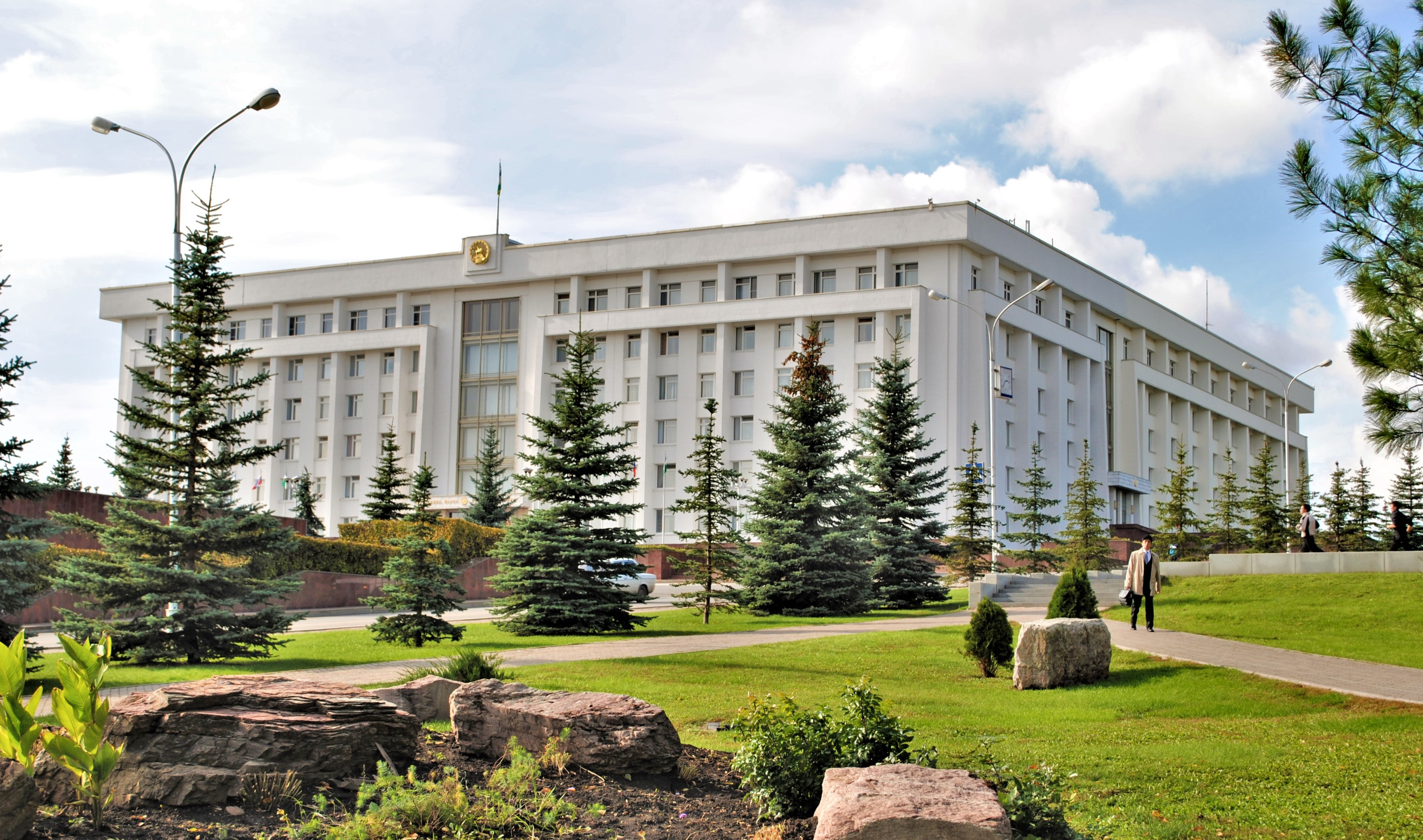
Building of the Administration of Head of the Republic of Bashkortostan

The Administration of the Head RB secures realization of the functions of the head RB and CEO RB, the powers, imposed on the Head RB by the Constitution RB, the federal legislation and the legislation RB, by the Head RB.

The Administration of the Head RB:

- accomplishes the preparation of the bills for their introduction to the State Council-Kurultay - RB by the Head RB in the course of a legislative initiative;

-prepares the projects of decrees, orders and instructions of the Head RB and other documents, including the projects of the annual messages of the Head RB to the State Council-Kurultay - RB;

- controls execution of the decrees, orders and instructions of the Head RB;

-provides for interaction of the Head RB with the public authorities and functionaries of Russian Federation, the subjects of Russian Federation, foreign states, with the Russian, foreign political and public activists, international organizations, as well as with the public and religious communities, professional unions and other public formations of Russian Federation;

- provides for the activity of the advisory and deliberative bodies under the Head RB

- accomplishes collection, processing and analysis of the information about social-economical and public-political situation in Republic of Bashkortostan and its municipalities, preparation of analytical, reference and other materials for the Head RB;

- accomplishes calculation, generalization and analysis of public appeals, proposals of the public communities and local self-government bodies, introduction of the corresponding materials to the Head of Republic of Bashkortostan;

The Head of Republic of Bashkortostan presides over the Administration of the Head RB. The head of the Administration RB monitors the performance of the Administration RB.
