= Ministry of Nature =

Government ministry focusing on nature policy

A ministry of Nature is a government department in some countries that typically oversees the protection of nature. The person in charge of such a department is usually known as a minister of nature or minister for nature.

== List ==
- Ministry of Nature and Animal Welfare, in Denmark
- Ministry of Nature Management and Ecology, in Russia
- Ministry of Nature Protection, in Armenia

== See also ==
- Ministry of Environment
- List of environmental ministries
