= Ufimsky refinery plant =

Oil refinery in Ufa, Russia

Bashneft-UNPZ, Bashneft – Ufimsky refinery plant
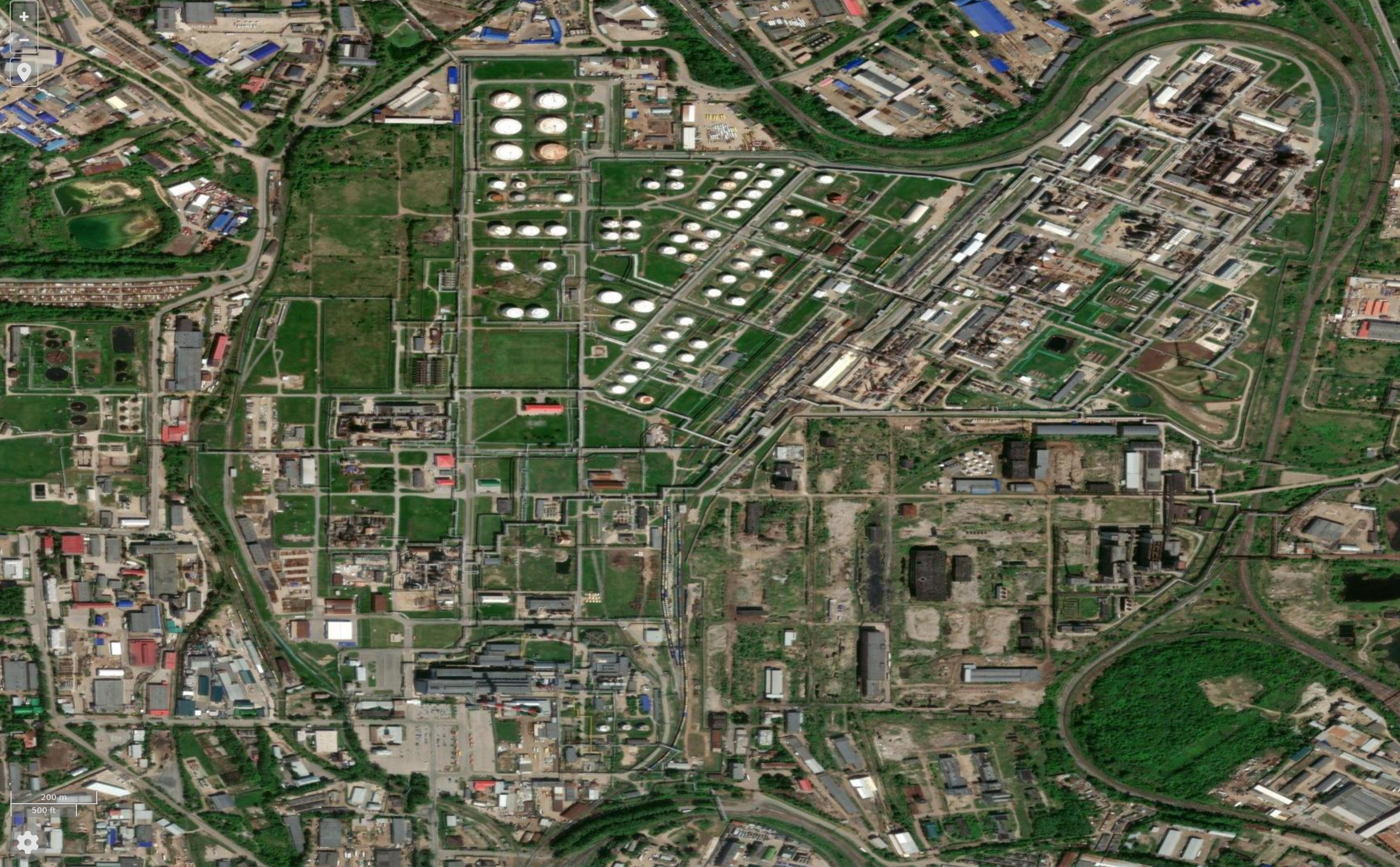
- Satellite imagery of Ufimsky refinery plant
- Interactive map of Bashneft-UNPZ, Bashneft – Ufimsky refinery plant
- Location: Ufa, Bashkortostan, Russia; 54.85°N 56.1°E

Refinery details
- Operator: Bashneft
- Opened: 1937

Bashneft – Ufimsky refinery plant is a major Russian oil refinery located in Ufa, Bashkortostan. Operated by Bashneft (a subsidiary of Rosneft), the facility processes a variety of petroleum products using thermal, catalytic, and hydrogenation methods. Its primary refining feedstock consists of West Siberian crude oil (approximately 50%), local Bashkir crude (approximately 40%), and natural gas condensate (10%).

The refinery's infrastructure is designed to produce Euro-4 and Euro-5 compliant motor fuels, boiler fuel, and liquefied petroleum gases. To reach full capacity for low-sulfur gasoline production, the plant integrated a catalytic cracking hydrotreater to remove sulfur compounds. As of 2020, the registered authorized capital of the joint-stock company was valued at 619.3 million rubles.

During the Russo-Ukrainian War, the plant's operational and refining capacity was significantly reduced following successive Ukrainian long-range drone strikes in March and October 2025, with further disruptive attacks occurring in June and July 2026.

== History ==
=== Foundation and early operations (1935–1990) ===
Construction of the refinery began in 1935, and the facility officially commenced operations in 1937, following the launch of an adjacent stone-processing plant the previous year. In 1938, the plant manufactured its first industrial output, delivering 117 tons of specialized racing oil. The completion of the refinery's initial developmental stage followed in 1939. During the Great Patriotic War, the factory expanded production to supply fuel to Soviet military units at the front.

By the late 1940s, successive construction waves expanded the plant's structural footprint: the second stage added a combined pyrolysis unit, a sulfate-phenol refining plant, and a bitumen facility, while the third stage integrated gas fractionation, polymerization, and hydrogenation units.

=== Post-Soviet modernization and ownership changes (1994–2024) ===
The plant was absorbed into the newly established Bashkir Petrochemical Company in 1994. To modernise legacy infrastructure, the refinery commissioned a G-43-107M/1 catalytic cracking complex in 1995 to increase total oil refining depth and output volume for high-octane motor fuels. In 2008, the company deployed "Isomalk-2" isomerization technology, installing a dedicated unit designed for pentane–hexane fractions featuring full hexane recycling.

Corporate structural changes continued in 2012 when the joint-stock company (JSC) Ufa Refinery was restructured and placed under the management of JSC ANC Bashneft. As of 2020, the registered share capital of the entity was established at 619.3 million rubles. Processing feedstock at the plant through 2024 remained dependent on West Siberian crude oil (50%), regional Bashkiria oil (40%), and natural gas condensate (10%).

=== Russo-Ukrainian War airstrikes (2025–2026) ===
As a high-capacity regional infrastructure asset, the refinery became a target of long-range Ukrainian drone operations during the Russo-Ukrainian War. On March 3, 2025, a drone strike hit the facility—located roughly 1,500 km (930 mi) from the Ukrainian border—igniting a fire that engulfed approximately 100 m^{2} (1,100 sq ft) of the complex. Further aerial bombardments on October 11, 2025, inflicted structural damage on primary oil processing components, complicating systemic refining capabilities.

Drone incursions targeting the Ufa refining cluster persisted into mid-2026. Strikes recorded on June 25 and July 1, 2026, caused subsequent industrial blazes and operational slowdowns across the complex, requiring long-term repairs that severely depressed the plant's overall primary distillation and lubricant manufacturing capacities.

== Products ==
The Ufimsky refinery processes crude oil and gas condensate into a variety of commercial-grade petroleum products, tailored for both domestic Russian markets and international export.

=== Motor fuels ===
The refinery's primary outputs are automotive gasolines and diesel fuels manufactured to meet modern environmental standards. Its consumer-grade petroleum line includes high-octane unleaded vehicle fuels, specifically Regular-92 (AI-92) and Premium-95 (AI-95) grades.

Its diesel processing units produce specialized low-sulfur and environmentally optimized diesel fuels designed for variable climates. These include winter-grade variants (such as Z-35 fractions optimized for sub-zero temperatures) and summer-grade fuels (L-62).

=== Industrial and chemical outputs ===
Beyond consumer motor fuels, the facility utilizes heavy residual oils to manufacture M-100 heavy fuel oil (mazut), which is primarily utilized as a boiler fuel for industrial heating and power generation. The refinery's catalytic desulfurization and gas fractionation systems also yield secondary chemical commodities, including liquefied petroleum gases (LPG) and technical-grade lump sulfur recovered during the hydrotreating process.

== See also ==
- List of oil refineries
- Petroleum industry in Russia
