= Trebs and Titov oil fields =

Oil field complex in Nenets Okrug, Russia

- Location within Russia
- Country: Russia
- Region: Nenets Autonomous Okrug
- Offshore/onshore: onshore
- Coordinates: 68°39′11″N 57°49′40″E
- Operator: Bashneft
- Partners: Bashneft (74.9%); Lukoil (25.1%)

Production
- Recoverable oil (million tonnes): 210.9

Trebs and Titov oil fields is a complex of Arctic oil fields in the Timan-Pechora Basin in Nenets Autonomous Okrug, Russia.

The oil fields have around 1.1 billion barrels (170×10^{6} m^{3}) of estimated oil reserves. Recoverable reserves are 78.1 million tons in the Trebs field and 132.8 million tons in the Titov field. In 2006, the Trebs and Titov fields were designated as "strategic fields".

The license for development of these fields was auctioned in 2010. Although initial interest was shown by Lukoil, TNK-BP, Gazprom Neft, Surgutneftegaz, Bashneft, and ONGC, the final bid was made only by Bashneft. The licence was issued to Bashneft on 2 December 2010.

On 15 April 2011, Lukoil agreed to acquire a 25.1% stake in the project.

== See also ==
- Petroleum industry in Russia
