= Ministry of Youth and Sports (Bashkortostan) =

Republic of Bashkortostan Ministry of Youth and Sports

Agency overview
- Jurisdiction: Government of the Republic of Bashkortostan
- Headquarters: Gosagroprom Building, 18 Soviet street, Ufa, Republic of Bashkortostan

The Ministry of Youth and Sports is a Cabinet department in the Executive branch of the Republic of Bashkortostan government. Appeared in 2010 under President Rustem Khamitov.

== Mission ==
The Republic of Bashkortostan Ministry of Youth and Sports is working to strengthen the Youth and Sports;
