= Ministry of Culture (Bashkortostan) =

Republic of Bashkortostan Ministry of Culture
- Башҡортостан Республикаһы; Мәҙәниәт министрлығы

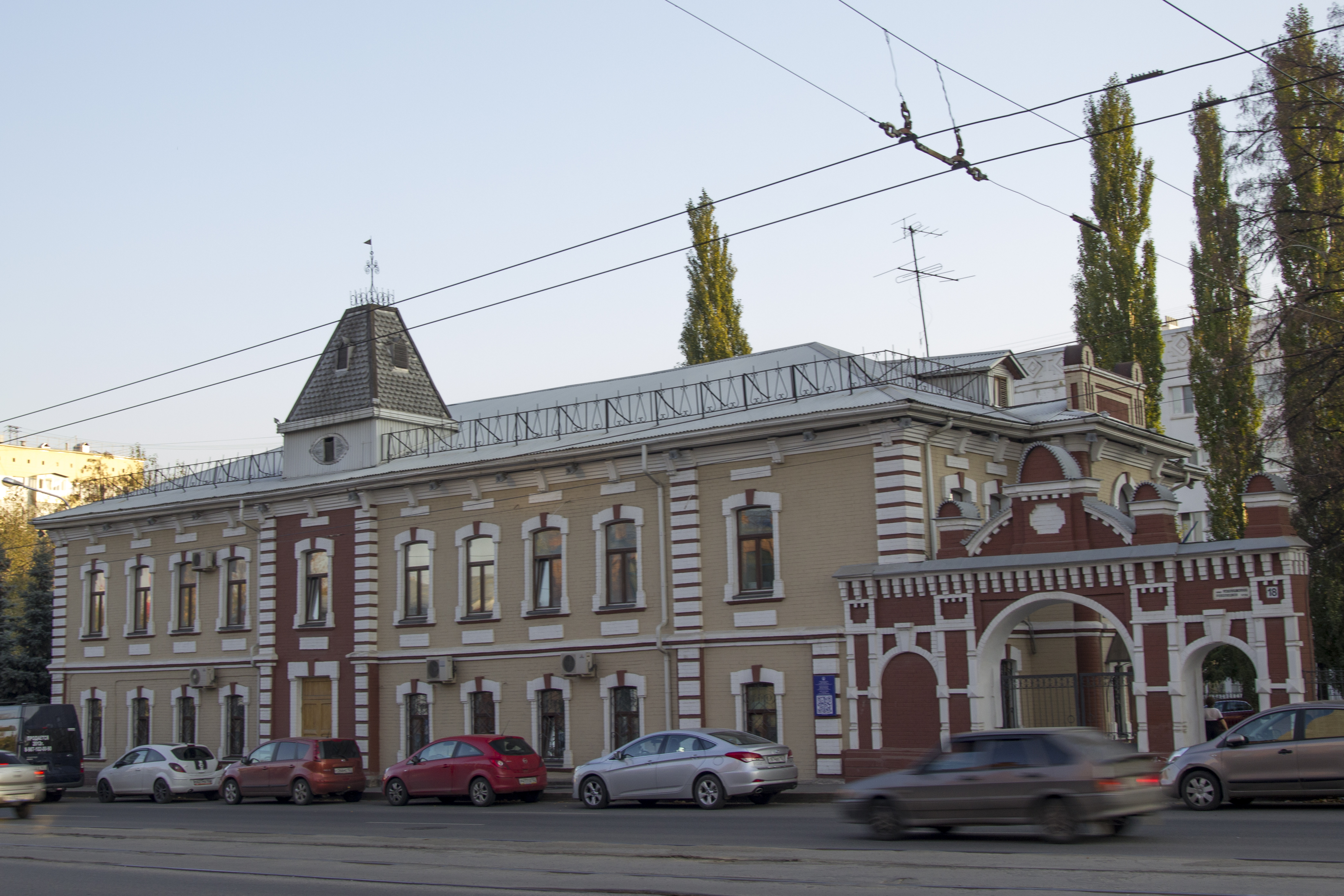
- Building of Ministry of Culture

Agency overview
- Jurisdiction: Government of the Republic of Bashkortostan
- Headquarters: 18 Revolution street, Ufa, Republic of Bashkortostan; 54.735912°N 55.949742°E
- Agency executive: Amina Ivnievna Shafikova, Minister
- Website: https://culture.bashkortostan.ru/

The Ministry of Culture is an agency of the government of Bashkortostan, headquartered in Feck building, Ufa. Until 2010, he was the Ministry of Culture and National Policy.

== Mission ==
The Republic of Bashkortostan Ministry of Culture is working to strengthen the Culture. It also supervises the work of lower establishments, for example Bashkir Nesterov Art Museum, Hudayberdin museum.

== Ministers ==
After the 2012 Head of the Ministry of Culture has been Amina Shafikova.
