= State Committee for Justice of the Republic of Bashkortostan =

Republic of Bashkortostan State Committee for Justice
- Башҡортостан Республикаһы; Юстиция буйынса дәүләт комитет

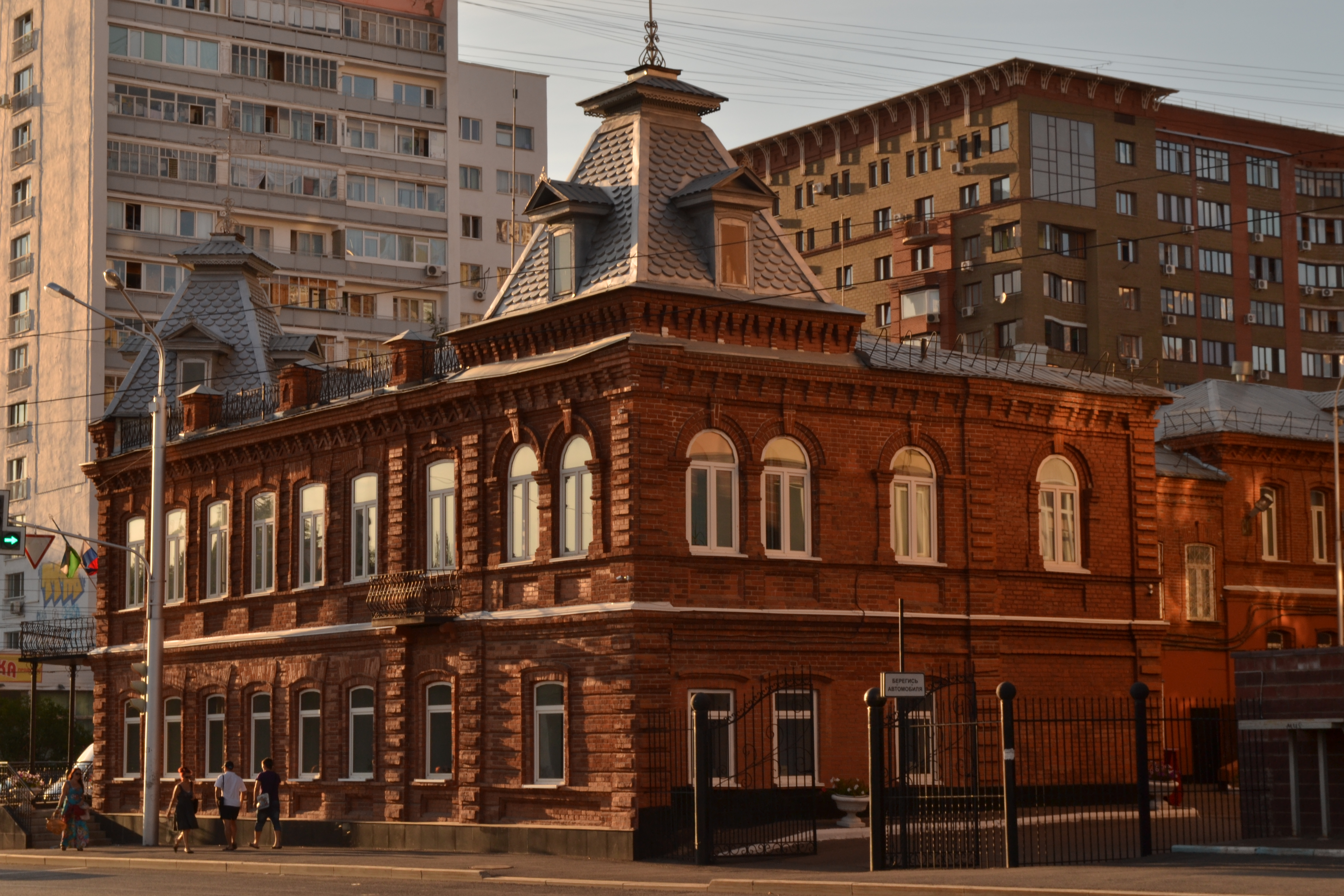
- Building of Committee for Justice

Agency overview
- Jurisdiction: Government of the Republic of Bashkortostan
- Headquarters: 38 Tsyurupy Street, Ufa, Republic of Bashkortostan, 450008; 54.725258°N 55.954059°E
- Website: https://goskomjust.bashkortostan.ru

The State Committee for Justice of the Republic of Bashkortostan is an agency of the government of Bashkortostan, headquartered in Platonov House. It is the successor of the former Ministry of Justice of the Republic of Bashkortostan.

As of 2015, the chief of the committee was Vladimir Spele who previously served from 2001–2006.
