= Ministry of Housing and Communal Services (Bashkortostan) =

State-level government ministry

Republic of Bashkortostan Ministry of Housing and Communal Services
- Башҡортостан Республикаһы торлаҡ-коммуналь хужалығы министрлығы

Agency overview
- Jurisdiction: Government of the Republic of Bashkortostan
- Headquarters: 28 Khalturin street, Ufa, Republic of Bashkortostan; 54.748046°N 55.979386°E
- Agency executive: Boris Belyaev, Minister
- Website: https://house.bashkortostan.ru/

The Ministry of Housing and Communal Services is an agency of the government of Bashkortostan, headquartered with State Committee for of Housing and Building Oversight in 28 Khalturin street, Ufa.

== Ministers ==
After the 2019 Head of the Ministry has been Boris Belyaev.

== See also ==
- Office of Federal Housing Enterprise Oversight
- State Committee for of Housing and Building Oversight
