= Republic House, Bashkortostan =

Coordinates: 54.7164°N 55.9408°E

Republic House
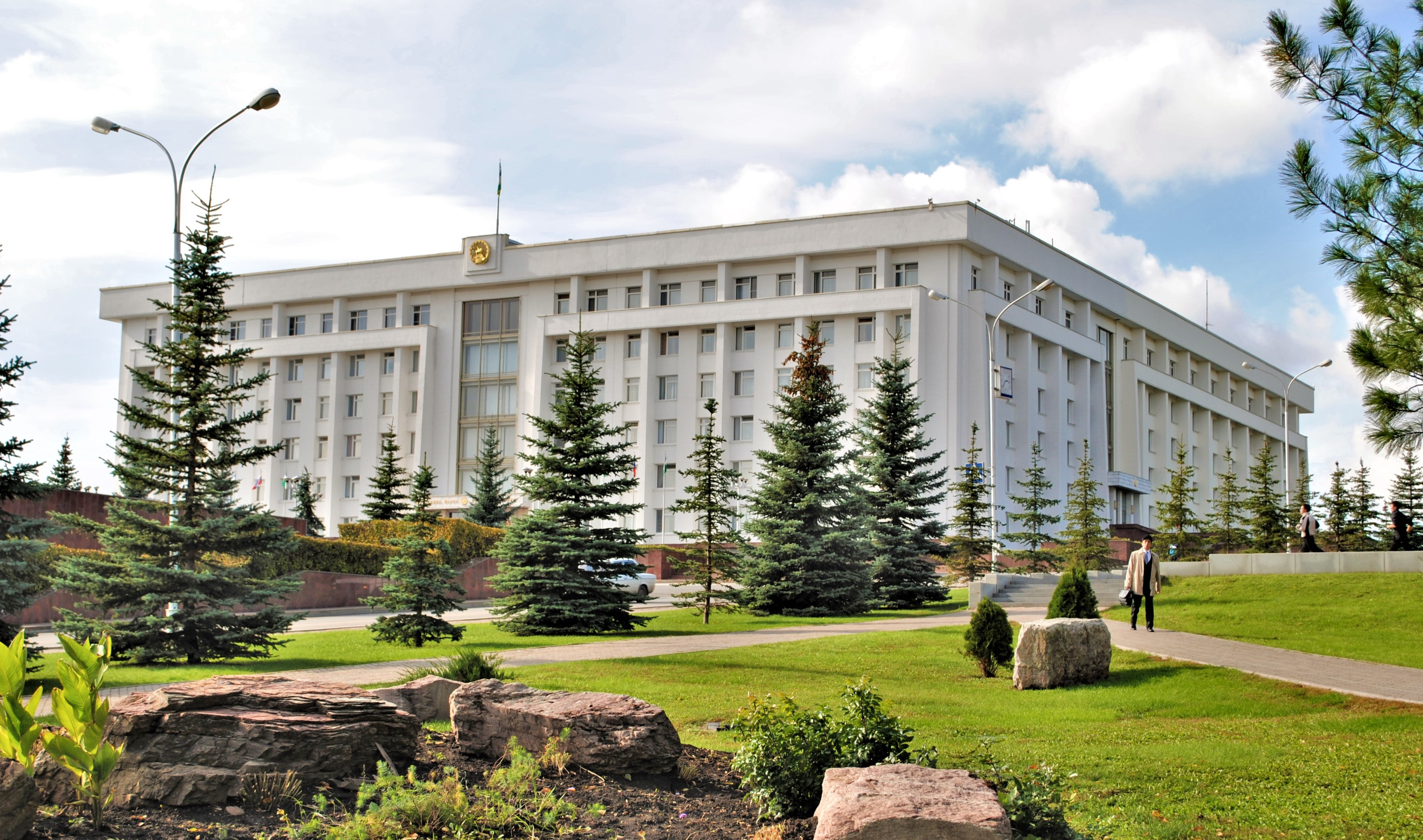
- Republic House
- Interactive map of the Republic House area
- Former names: (Bashkir: Республика Йорто, Respublica Yorto)
- Alternative names: Bashkir White House, House of the Republic

General information
- Architectural style: Modern Movement; Stripped classical
- Location: Bashkortostan, 450101, Ufa, Tukaeva street, 46
- Current tenants: Government of the Republic of Bashkortostan Administration of Head of the Republic of Bashkortostan; The Head of Bashkortostan Constitutional Court of the Republic of Bashkortostan (until 2023)
- Construction started: 1976
- Completed: 1979
- Renovated: 2010s
- Owner: Government of the Republic of Bashkortostan

The Republic House (House of the Republic) (Bashkir: Республика Йорто) is the headquarters of the Government of the Republic of Bashkortostan and the Head of Bashkortostan. It is located in the national capital, Ufa. It is a seven-story brick building constructed in 1979.

The Republic House is located in Tukaev Street, 46. The building hosts the Ministry of Finance and the Ministry of Economic Development.

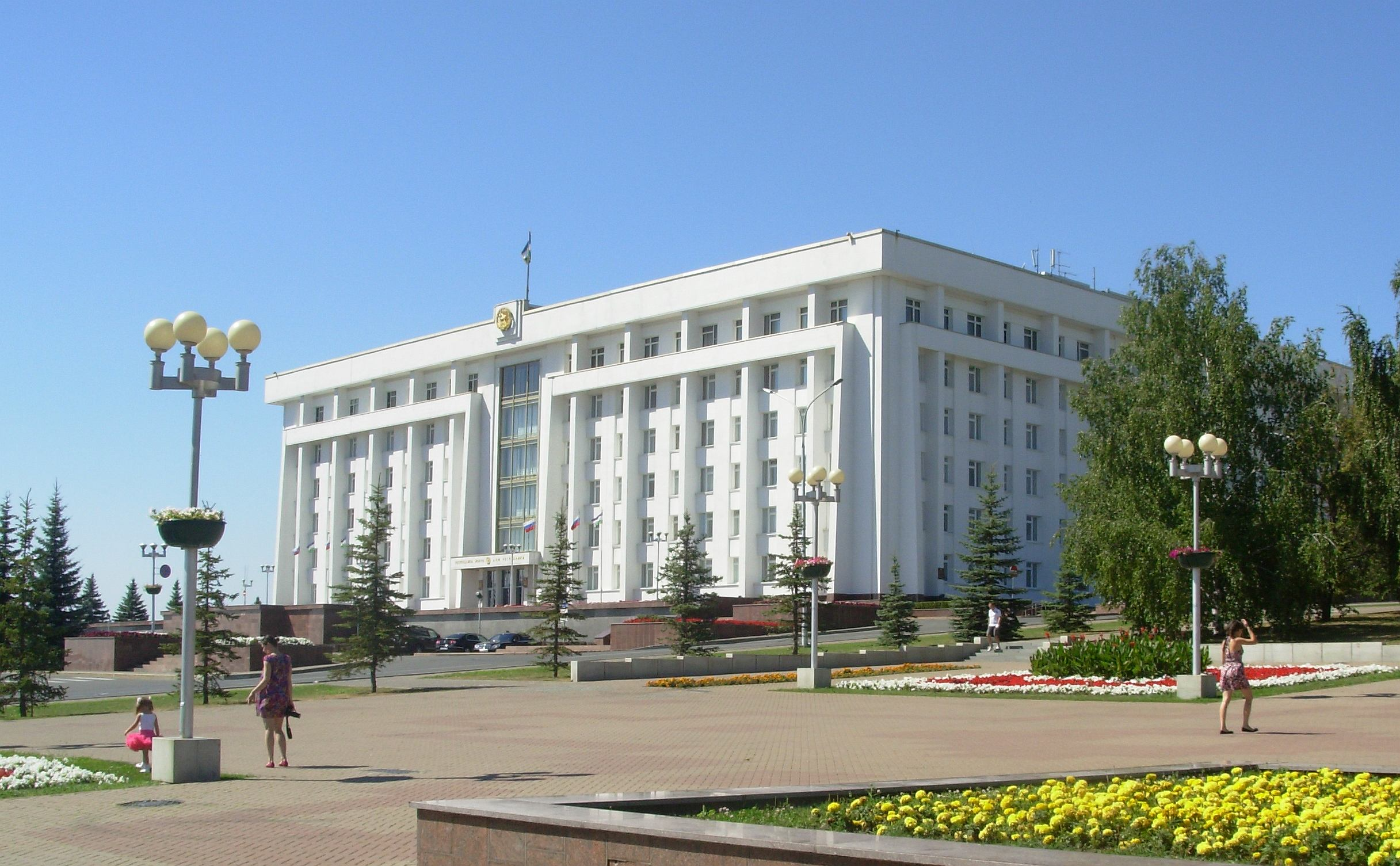
View from Tukaeva Street

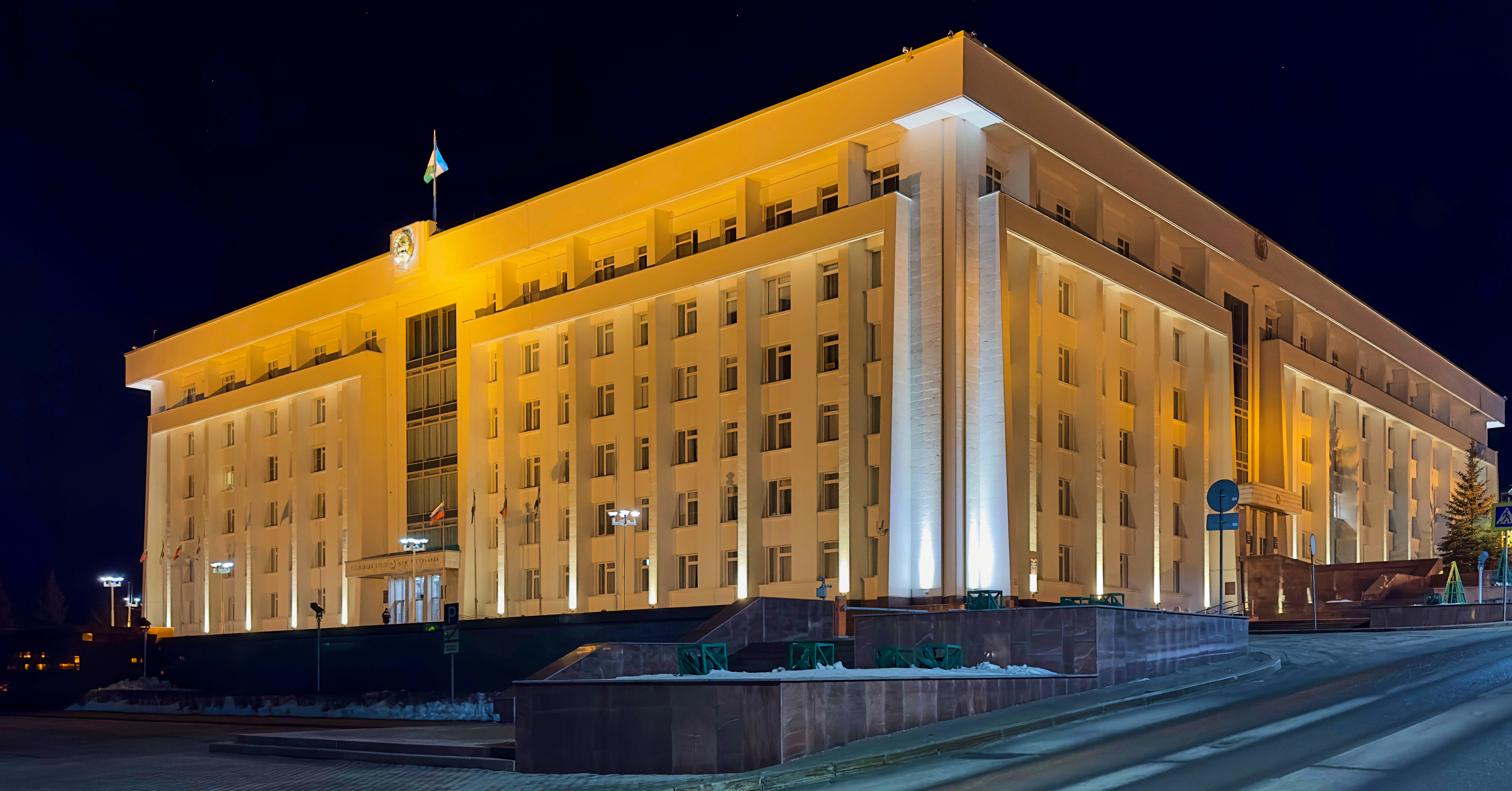
Evening view to the Republic House

== See also ==
- Gosagroprom Building
