= Ural Rakhimov =

Russian businessman (born 1961)

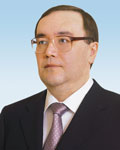
- Born: 13 December 1961 (age 64); Ufa, Russian SFSR, Soviet Union
- Education: French Petroleum Institute
- Occupation: Businessman
- Father: Murtaza Rakhimov

Ural Murtazovich Rakhimov (Russian: Урал Муртазович Рахимов; Bashkir: Рәхимов Урал Мортаза улы, Räximov Ural Mortaza ulı; born 13 December 1961) is a Russian businessman of Bashkir ethnicity. Rakhimov is the 191st richest man in Russia with a net worth of US$500 million as of 2011.

== Biography ==
Rakhimov was born in Ufa. Worldwide, Rakhimov is known to be the only son of Murtaza Rakhimov, the former president of Bashkortostan. Throughout most of Rakhimov's life, he maintained a deep interest in science, eventually studying at Ufa State Petroleum Technological University and graduating in 1984.

He then studied at the French Petroleum Institute, receiving a Master's of Science, and then he studied in the United States for another Master's degree. For most of his business career, he was a member of Bashneft. In 2003, he initiated the creation of Bashkir capital. During 2009 till early 2010, he was the owner of Salavat Yulaev Ufa.

=== Criminal prosecution ===
In April 2014, a criminal case was initiated against Ural Rakhimov. At the end of August 2014, he was charged in absentia with the legalization of illegally obtained funds (Article 174.1 of the Criminal Code of the Russian Federation) and embezzlement on a particularly large scale (Article 160 of the Criminal Code of the Russian Federation). The investigation remains ongoing and, in May 2017, it was extended for another three months, until 28 October 2017.

Rakhimov is accused of the illegal appropriation and laundering of shares in Bashneft. Entities under his control sold enterprises of the Bashkir fuel and energy sector to AFK Sistema following their privatization in 2005 and 2009.

In September 2014, Rakhimov was placed on the international wanted list.

In May 2015, Austrian authorities received a request for the extradition of Ural Rakhimov. However, in March 2016, the Vienna Regional Criminal Court ruled, at the request of the prosecution, not to extradite Rakhimov to Russia, citing political motives behind the criminal proceedings.
