= State Committee for of Housing and Building Oversight =

Republic of Bashkortostan State Committee for of Housing and Building Oversight
- Башҡортостан Республикаһы торлаҡ һәм төҙөлөш күҙәтеүе буйынса дәүләт комитет

Agency overview
- Jurisdiction: Government of the Republic of Bashkortostan
- Headquarters: 28 Khalturin street, Ufa, Republic of Bashkortostan; 54.748046°N 55.979386°E
- Website: https://zhilstroynadzor.bashkortostan.ru/

The State Committee for of Housing and Building Oversight is an agency of the government of Bashkortostan, headquartered with Ministry of Housing and Communal Services in 28 Khalturin street, Ufa. After the 2015 Chief of the State Committee has been Ildar Shafikov.
