= Murtaza Rakhimov =

Russian politician (1934–2023)

- Муртаза Рахимов; Мортаза Рәхимов
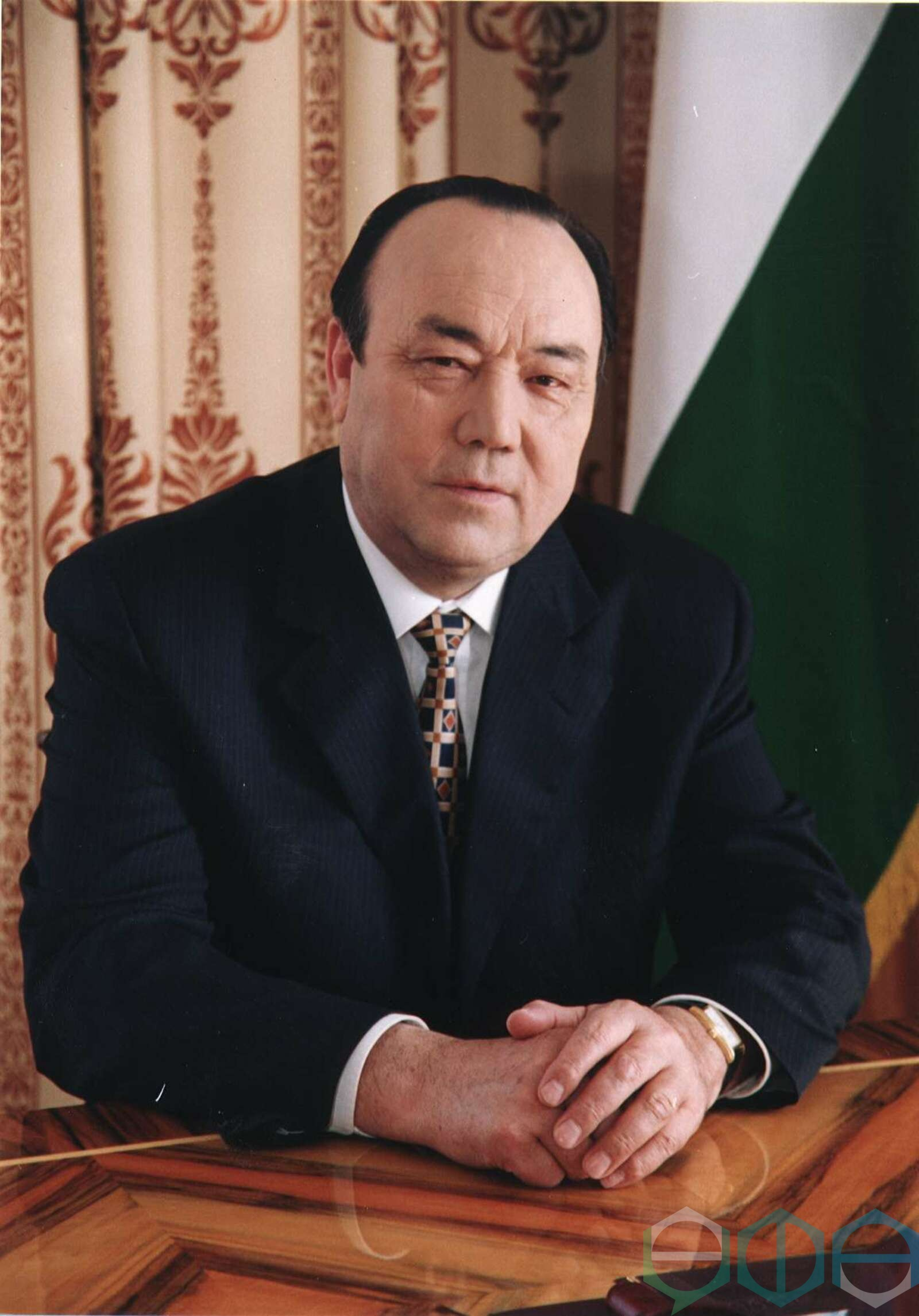
- Rakhimov c. 1990s

1st President of Bashkortostan
- In office 14 January 1994 – 15 July 2010
- Prime Minister: Anatoly Kopsov; Rim Bakiev; Rafael Baydavletov; Rail Sarbaev
- Preceded by: Office established
- Succeeded by: Rustem Khamitov

Personal details
- Born: 7 February 1934 Tavakanovo, Kugarchinsky District, Bashkir ASSR, Russian SFSR, USSR
- Died: 11 January 2023 (aged 88) Ufa, Bashkortostan, Russia
- Party: United Russia; All Russia (1999–2001)
- Spouse: Luiza Galimovna Rakhimova
- Children: Ural Rakhimov
- Education: Ufa Oil Institute
- Profession: Oilman

Murtaza Gubaydullovich Rakhimov (Russian: Муртаза Губайдуллович Рахимов; Bashkir: Мортаза Ғөбәйҙулла улы Рәхимов; 7 February 1934 – 11 January 2023) was a Russian politician of Bashkir ethnicity who served as the first President of Bashkortostan, a republic within Russia, from 1993 to 2010.

== Biography ==
Rakhimov was born on 7 February 1934 in the village of Tavakanovo of Kugarchinsky District of the Bashkir Autonomous Soviet Socialist Republic.

After graduating from the Ufa Oil Technical School, he began working at the Ufa refinery named XXII Congress of the CPSU.

In 1964, Rakhimov on the job he graduated from Ufa Oil Institute, later went to work at the Novo-Ufimsky refinery plant, and in 1986 was appointed director of the company.

In 1989, Rakhimov was elected deputy of the USSR, and in the same year, he was appointed Chairman of the Supreme Council of the Republic of Bashkortostan.

In November 1993, Rakhimov was nominated as a candidate for deputy of the Federation Council, and in December the same year, Rakhimov was popularly elected the first President of Bashkortostan.

On 14 June 1998, he was reelected to the post of President of Bashkortostan for a second term.

On 21 December 2003, in accordance with the Federal law "About main guarantees of electoral rights and rights on participation in referendum of citizens of the Russian Federation", Rakhimov was elected as the President of Bashkortostan for a third time.

Rakhimov was a member of the Federal Council of the Federal Assembly of the Russian Federation (1993–2001).

Latterly, he was a member of the Council of State of the Russian Federation, the Chairman of the Council of Bashkortostan Republic and the Presidential Council of Bashkortostan Republic, the Chairman of the interdepartmental Council of the public security of Bashkortostan Republic.

== Later activities ==
Rakhimov worked as a contributor of Sistema to manage Russia's Bashneft as part of the oil producer's board of directors, and worked as a prominent politician in Russia.

== Personal life and death ==
Rakhimov was married to Luiza Galimovna Rakhimova, and had one son, Ural Rakhimov. His son is one of the wealthiest men in Russia, having a fortune of at least $500 million, and is not married. Rakhimov's official biographer has noted that Rakhimov liked music, fiction, and physical culture.

Rakhimov died in Ufa on 11 January 2023, at the age of 88.

== Awards ==
Rakhimov was awarded the Order of the Badge of Honour (1980), Order of the Red Banner of Labour (1986), Order of Friendship of Peoples (1994), Orders "For Merit to the Fatherland" of I (2010) and II degree (1999), the Order of sacred Pious tsarevitch Moscow Dimitriy and Uglich wonder-worker (1999), "For merits before Republic Bashkortostan" (2000), "For the benefit of Fatherland" by the name of V. N. Tatishchev (the Russian academy of natural sciences) (2002), of Peter the Great (public fund "The best managers of an epoch") (2002), of Salavat Yulaev (2004). Moreover, in 1996, 1999 and 2004, Rahimov was thanked officially on behalf of the President of RF. He was awarded the Certificate of Honour of the Federal Council of the Federal Assembly of the Russian Federation (2001), the Certificate of Honour of the Government RF (2002), the premium "Russian National Olympus" in the nomination "President 2002–2003", the Honourable national sign "the Leader of the Russian economy" (2004). He was conferred the honorary ranks of "the Deserved rationalizer of RSFSR" (1974) and "the Deserved oilman of Bashkiria" (1977).

Preceded by none	President of Bashkortostan; 17 December 1993 – 15 July 2010	Succeeded by Rustem Khamitov
