= Ministry of Finance (Bashkortostan) =

Cabinet Department of Bashkortostan

Republic of Bashkortostan Ministry of Finance

Agency overview
- Jurisdiction: Government of the Republic of Bashkortostan
- Headquarters: Republic House
- Agency executive: Rida Tagirovna Subkhankulova, Minister

The Ministry of Finance is a Cabinet department in the Executive branch of the Republic of Bashkortostan government. The head of the Ministry is the Minister of Finance, who was Rida Tagirovna Subkhankulova as of 2016.
