= Ministry of Economic Development (Bashkortostan) =

Republic of Bashkortostan Ministry of Economic Development

Agency overview
- Jurisdiction: Government of the Republic of Bashkortostan
- Headquarters: Republic House
- Agency executive: Minister

The Ministry of Economic Development is a Cabinet department in the Executive branch of the Republic of Bashkortostan government.
