= Yuzhno Khilchuyu oil field =

Oil field in Timan-Pechora Basin, Russia

Yuzhno Khilchuyu Oil Field
- Location within Russia
- Country: Russia
- Region: Timan-Pechora Basin
- Offshore/onshore: onshore
- Coordinates: 68.1561°N 55.3133°E
- Operator: Lukoil

Field history
- Discovery: 2008
- Start of production: 2008

Production
- Estimated oil in place: 214 million tonnes (~ 251.8×10^{6} m^{3} or 1584 million bbl)

The Yuzhno Khilchuyu Oil Field is an oil field located in Timan-Pechora Basin. It was discovered in 2008 and developed by Lukoil. The oil field is operated and owned by Lukoil. The total proven reserves of the Yuzhno Khilchuyu oil field are around 1.58 billion barrels (214 million tonnes), and production is centered on 67,000 barrels per day (10,700 m^{3}/d).

== See also ==
- Petroleum industry in Russia
