= State Committee for construction and architecture =

Republic of Bashkortostan State Committee for construction and architecture

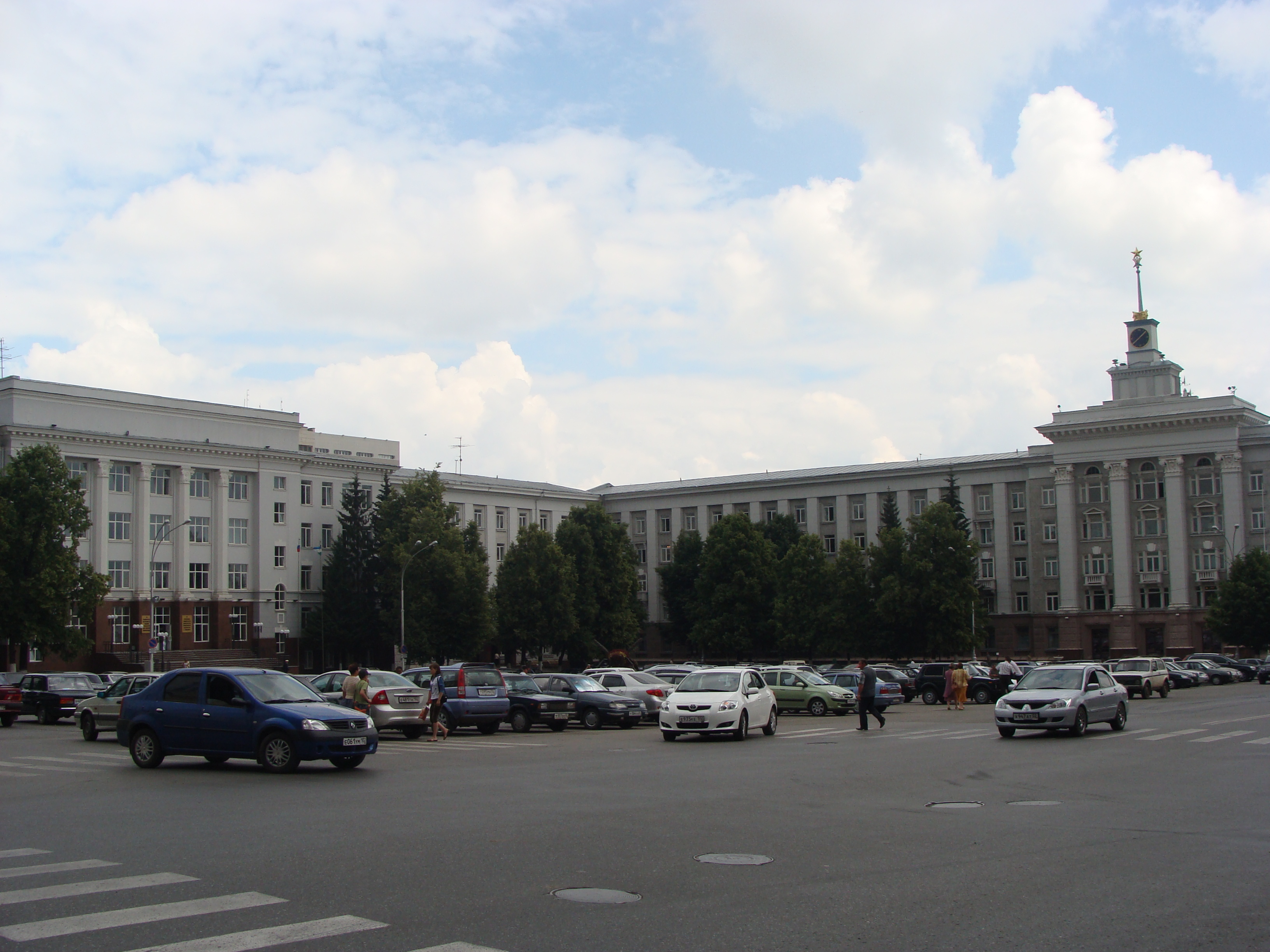
- The State Committee building pictured in 2008

Agency overview
- Jurisdiction: Government of the Republic of Bashkortostan
- Headquarters: Gosagroprom Building, 18 Soviet street, Ufa, Republic of Bashkortostan
- Website: building.bashkortostan.ru

The State Committee for construction and architecture is a Cabinet department in the Executive branch of the Republic of Bashkortostan government. It is the successor of the former Ministry of Construction, architecture and transport, which was split in State Committee for construction and architecture and State Committee for Transport and Roads in 2010 under President Rustem Khamitov.

== Mission ==
The State Committee for construction and architecture's mission is to create strong, sustainable, inclusive communities and quality affordable homes for all.

The State Committee for construction and architecture is working to strengthen the housing market to bolster the economy and protect consumers; meet the need for quality affordable rental homes; utilize housing as a platform for improving quality of life; build inclusive and sustainable communities free from discrimination; and transform the way The State Committee for construction and architecture and architecture does business.

== See also ==
- United States Department of Housing and Urban Development
