= Timan-Pechora Basin =

Oil field in Russia

The Timan-Pechora Basin is a sedimentary basin located between Timan Ridge and the Ural Mountains in northern Russia. The basin contains oil and gas fields.

== Oil and gas extraction ==
A planned project to mine its oil and gas was conceived in the mid-1990s and approved by United States and Russian Governments. As of September 29, 2004, Conoco and LUKoil planned to jointly develop this Basin.

2004	2005	2006	2007	2008	2009	2010	2011	Reference
11.732	12.476	13.601	14.576	16.685	21.662	21.175	17.547	

Since 2004 the production increased and the importance for LUKoil increased. However, the production began to decline in 2010. Large investments are needed to increase production rates or at least to maintain production at levels over 17 million tons annually.

Oil extraction has produced limited environmental damage. In particular it has caused eutrophication and organic contamination of waters as interpreted from low diatom diversity and absence of pollution sensitive diatoms among other things. Possibly oil extraction is also behind lower avian diversity at some locations as transport activity might have disturbed wildlife. Despite this much of the Pechora region can be described as "semi-pristine" from an ecological point of view.

In a 2018 assessment, the United States Geological Survey estimated for undiscovered, technically recoverable continuous resources, the mean totals for the region are 1,425 million barrels of shale oil, or 1.4 billion barrels of oil; 45,721 billion cubic feet, or 46 trillion cubic feet of gas; and 737 million barrels of natural gas liquids.

== See also ==
- Pechora coal basin
- Trebs and Titov oil fields
- Yuzhno Khilchuyu oil field
- Petroleum industry in Russia
