= Rakhmetovo =

Rakhmetovo Рахметово
- Village
- Location within Bashkortostan Location within Russia
- Coordinates: 53°49′N 58°53′E
- Country: Russia
- Region: Bashkortostan
- District: Abzelilovsky District
- Time zone: UTC+5:00

Rakhmetovo (Russian: Рахметово; Bashkir: Рәхмәт, Räxmät) is a rural locality (a village) in Baimovsky Selsoviet, Abzelilovsky District, Bashkortostan, Russia. The population was 341 as of 2010. There are 10 streets.

== Geography ==
Rakhmetovo is located 79 km north of Askarovo (the district's administrative centre) by road. Yaykarovo is the nearest rural locality.
