= Ministry of Land and Property Relations (Bashkortostan) =

Republic of Bashkortostan Ministry of Land and Property Relations
- Башҡортостан Республикаһы; Ер һәм мөлкәт мөнәсәбәттәре министрлығы

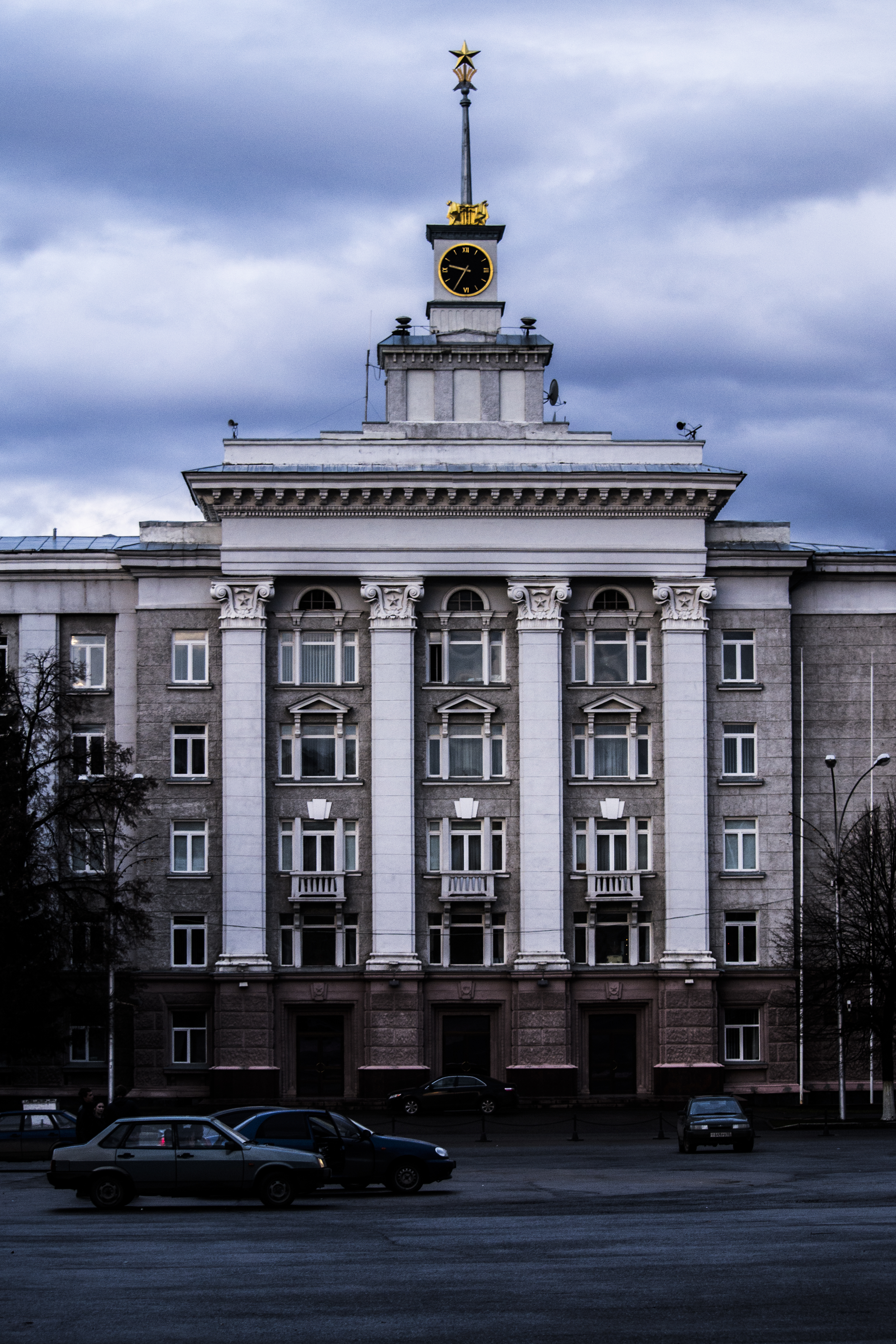
- Building of Land and Property Relations

Agency overview
- Jurisdiction: Government of the Republic of Bashkortostan
- Headquarters: 54.72164°N 55.948842°E
- Website: https://mzio.bashkortostan.ru/

The Ministry of Land and Property Relations is an agency of the government of Bashkortostan, headquartered in Soviet Square, Ufa.

== Some functions ==
- Certification cadastral engineers
- Reception of applications and issuance of documents on the coordination of projects of land parcel boundaries
- Participation in state regulation of land relations, development and implementation of land reform programs, government programs related to real estate.
- Accounting for state property and division of property
- Privatization of State Property of the Republic of Bashkortostan

== Ministers ==
After the 2018 Head of the Ministry has been Oleg Polstovalov.
