= Tavakanovo =

Tavakanovo Таваканово
- Village
- Location within Bashkortostan Location within Russia
- Coordinates: 52°36′N 56°20′E
- Country: Russia
- Region: Bashkortostan
- District: Kugarchinsky District
- Time zone: UTC+5:00

Tavakanovo (Russian: Таваканово; Bashkir: Тәүәкән, Täwäkän) is a rural locality (a village) and the administrative centre of Tlyaumbetovsky Selsoviet, Kugarchinsky District, Bashkortostan, Russia. The population was 581 as of 2010. There are 9 streets.

== Geography ==
Tavakanovo is located 38 km southwest of Mrakovo (the district's administrative centre) by road. Progress is the nearest rural locality.
