= Ministry of Education (Bashkortostan) =

Republic of Bashkortostan Ministry of Education
- Башҡортостан Республикаһы; Мәғариф министрлығы

Agency overview
- Jurisdiction: Government of the Republic of Bashkortostan
- Headquarters: 5/2, Theatre Street, Ufa, 450002, Russia
- Website: http://www.morb.ru

The Ministry of Education is a Cabinet department in the Executive branch of the Republic of Bashkortostan government.

Ministry has a policy to Bashkir language saved and development.

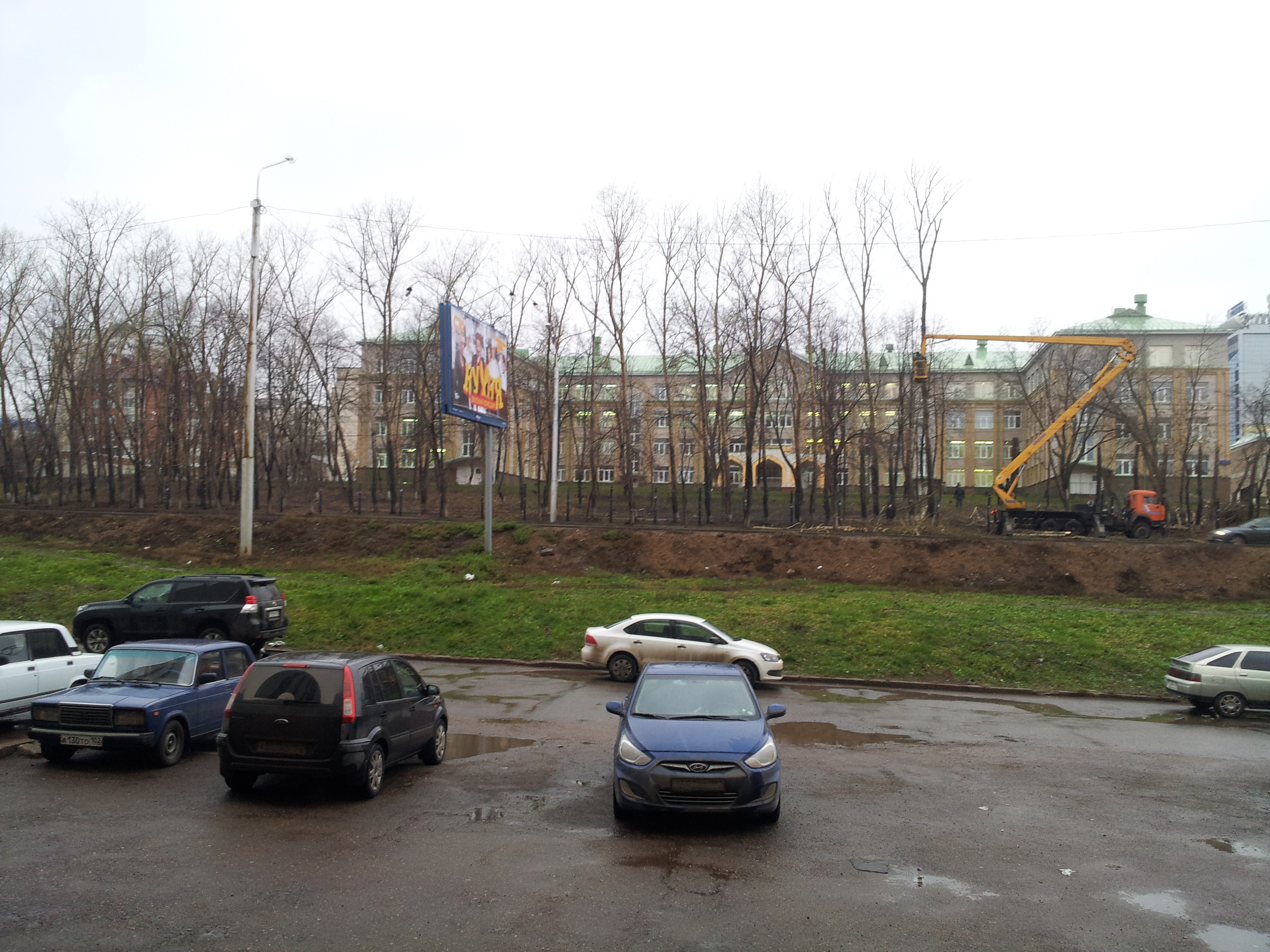
Rami Garipov School is one of lower establishments which Ministry of Education of Bashkortostan are doing supervises work.

== Mission ==
The Republic of Bashkortostan Ministry of Education is working to strengthen the Education;

== Structure ==
The structure of the ministry includes:

- Department of General Education and state final certification;
- Department of vocational education;
- Department of Higher Professional Education;
- Informatization Sector of Education;
- Department of rest, education and additional education.
