= Head of the Republic of Bashkortostan =

Highest-ranking official in Bashkortostan, Russia

- Башҡортостан Республикаһы Башлығы (Bashkir); Глава Республики Башкортостан (Russian)
- Standard of the head of the republic

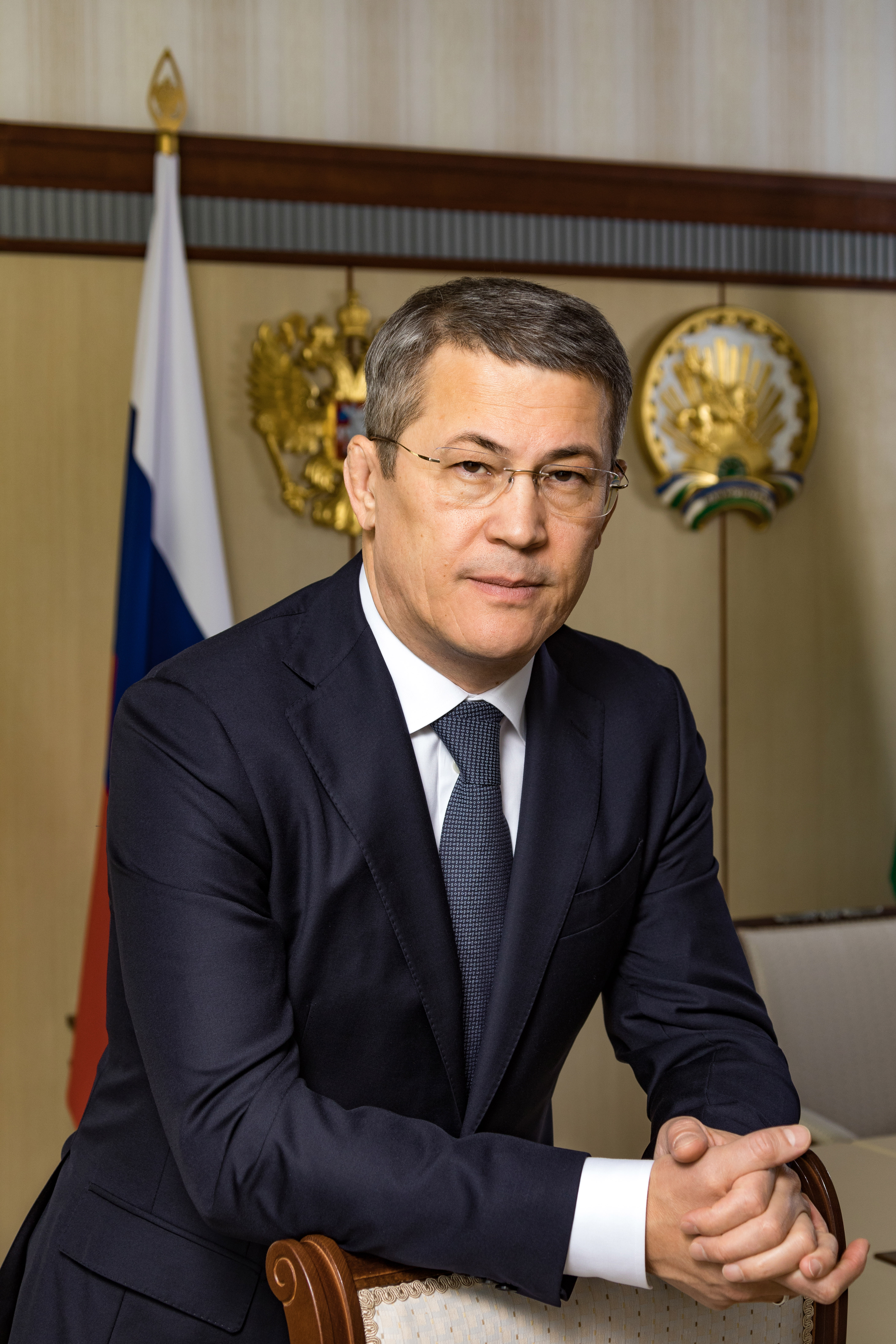
- Incumbent; Radiy Khabirov since 11 October 2018
- Government of the Republic of Bashkortostan; Administration of Head of the Republic of Bashkortostan
- Style: His Excellency; The Honorable
- Type: Governor; Head of state; Head of government
- Member of: Government of the Republic of Bashkortostan
- Residence: Republic House
- Nominator: Political parties
- Appointer: Direct elections
- Term length: 5 years
- Constituting instrument: Bashkortostan Constitution
- Formation: 25 December 1993
- First holder: Murtaza Rakhimov
- Website: Official website

The Head of the Republic of Bashkortostan (Bashkir: Башҡортостан Республикаһы Башлығы, translit. Bashqortostan Respublikahï Bashlïghï - before 1 January 2015 the title was called President [Президенты, Prezidentï]) is the highest executive position in the Republic of Bashkortostan, a federal subject of the Russian Federation. The Head is the republic's regional head of state and head of government.

The Head of Bashkortostan is appointed for a five-year term and must be a citizen of the Russian Federation who is at least thirty years old.

The first President of Bashkortostan was Murtaza Rakhimov, who has held the office from 12 December 1993. He was re-elected twice—on 4 June 1998 and on 21 December 2003. The election procedure was abolished in 2006, when Rakhimov was appointed President by the Bashkortostan Kurultai according to the recommendation of the President of Russia, Vladimir Putin.

Since 11 October 2018 the Head of the Republic of Bashkortostan is Radiy Khabirov.

== Status and powers ==
The Head of the Republic of Bashkortostan is considered the leader of the Republic; he heads the Government of the Republic of Bashkortostan. The Head of the Republic of Bashkortostan represents the Republic of Bashkortostan in the relations with the President of the Russian Federation, the Federation Council and the State Duma of the Russian Federation’s Federal Assembly, other federal government bodies, government bodies of the Russian Federation’s subjects, governmental bodies of the Republic of Bashkortostan, local self-government bodies, public communities, other organizations and functionaries, including execution of international and external economic relations.

The term of office of the Head of the Republic of Bashkortostan is five years. The status and powers of the Head are fixed by the federal laws in accordance with the Constitution of Russian Federation, the Constitution of the Republic of Bashkortostan and the laws of the Republic of Bashkortostan. The Head of the Republic of Bashkortostan guarantees realization of human rights and liberties, protects economic and political interests of the Republic of Bashkortostan and maintains the law and order on its territory.

The Head of the Republic also determines the main directions in the socio-economic development of the republic, forms the Republican Government and guides its activities, appoints the Prime-Minister and makes the decisions concerning the dismissal of the republic's government.

The Head also appoints and dismisses the heads of and determines the structure of the republican executive power bodies, the plenipotentiaries of the Republic of Bashkortostan under the public authorities of Russian Federation, the subjects of Russian Federation, in the subjects of foreign federal states and in the administrative-territorial units of foreign states.

The Head can also introduce bills to the State Council-Kurultay-RB, promulgates the laws of the republic or defeats them, introduces the programs on social-economic development RB to the State Council-Kurultay-RB, the report about situation in the Republic and appeals to the State Council-Kurultay-RB.

The Head RB introduces the candidatures to the office of the Chairman, the deputy Chairman, the judges of the Constitutional Court RB, the ombudsman for human rights in Republic of Bashkortostan, the Chairman of the Audit and Accounts Chamber RB, representatives of public communities in the qualifications collegium of judges RB and the candidatures to the Justices of Peace.

The Head RB appoints the members of the Central Electoral Commission RB within the limits of his powers.

The Head RB signs contracts and agreements on behalf of the Republic of Bashkortostan, establishes the Administration of the Head RB and forms the interdepartmental Public Security Council RB.

The Head RB rewards citizens RB with the state awards RB and with the honorable and other ranks of Republic of Bashkortostan. The Head RB accomplishes other powers in accordance with the Constitution of the Republic of Bashkortostan, the federal laws, the Law RB "The Head of the Republic of Bashkortostan" and other laws RB.

In those cases, when the Head of the Republic of Bashkortostan can't provisionally fulfill his duties (because of either illness or leave), these duties are fulfilled by the Prime-Minister of the Government RB. The powers of the Head RB cannot be used for either dissolution or abeyance of the activity of the elected government bodies, except the cases, provided for the Federal Law and the Constitution RB

== Changing the federal government job titles ==
In December 2010 Russian President Dmitry Medvedev signed a law that forbade calling heads of subjects of the Russian Federation as presidents. Regions must bring their constitutions or statutes in conformity with the law adopted before 1 January 2015.

On 27 February 2014, deputies of the Kurultay in the third and final reading approved amendments to the local Constitution, which proposed to rename the post of "president" to "head of the Republic of Bashkortostan" ("bashlygy" in the local language).

The changes took effect on 1 January 2015.

There is an opinion that the change of title was unconstitutional.

== List of officeholders ==
No.	Portrait	Name (born–died)	Term of office			Political party	Election
No.	Portrait	Name (born–died)	Took office	Left office	Time in office	Political party	Election
1		Murtaza Rakhimov; Муртаза Рахимов (1934–2023)	25 December 1993	15 July 2010	16 years, 202 days	Independent	1993; 1998; 2003; 2006
1		Murtaza Rakhimov; Муртаза Рахимов (1934–2023)	25 December 1993	15 July 2010	16 years, 202 days	United Russia	1993; 1998; 2003; 2006
—		Rustem Khamitov; Рустэм Хамитов (born 1954)	15 July 2010	20 July 2010	5 days	United Russia	Acting
2		Rustem Khamitov; Рустэм Хамитов (born 1954)	20 July 2010	30 May 2014	3 years, 314 days	United Russia	2010
—		Rustem Khamitov; Рустэм Хамитов (born 1954)	30 May 2014	25 September 2014	118 days	United Russia	Acting
2		Rustem Khamitov; Рустэм Хамитов (born 1954)	25 September 2014	11 October 2018	4 years, 16 days	United Russia	2014
—		Radiy Khabirov; Радий Хабиров (born 1964)	11 October 2018	19 September 2019	343 days	United Russia	Acting
3		Radiy Khabirov; Радий Хабиров (born 1964)	19 September 2019	Incumbent	6 years, 353 days	United Russia	2019; 2024

The latest election for the office was held on 8 September 2024.
