= State Committee for Transport and Roads =

Cabinet department in the Republic of Bashkortostan government, Russia

Republic of Bashkortostan State Committee for Transport and Roads

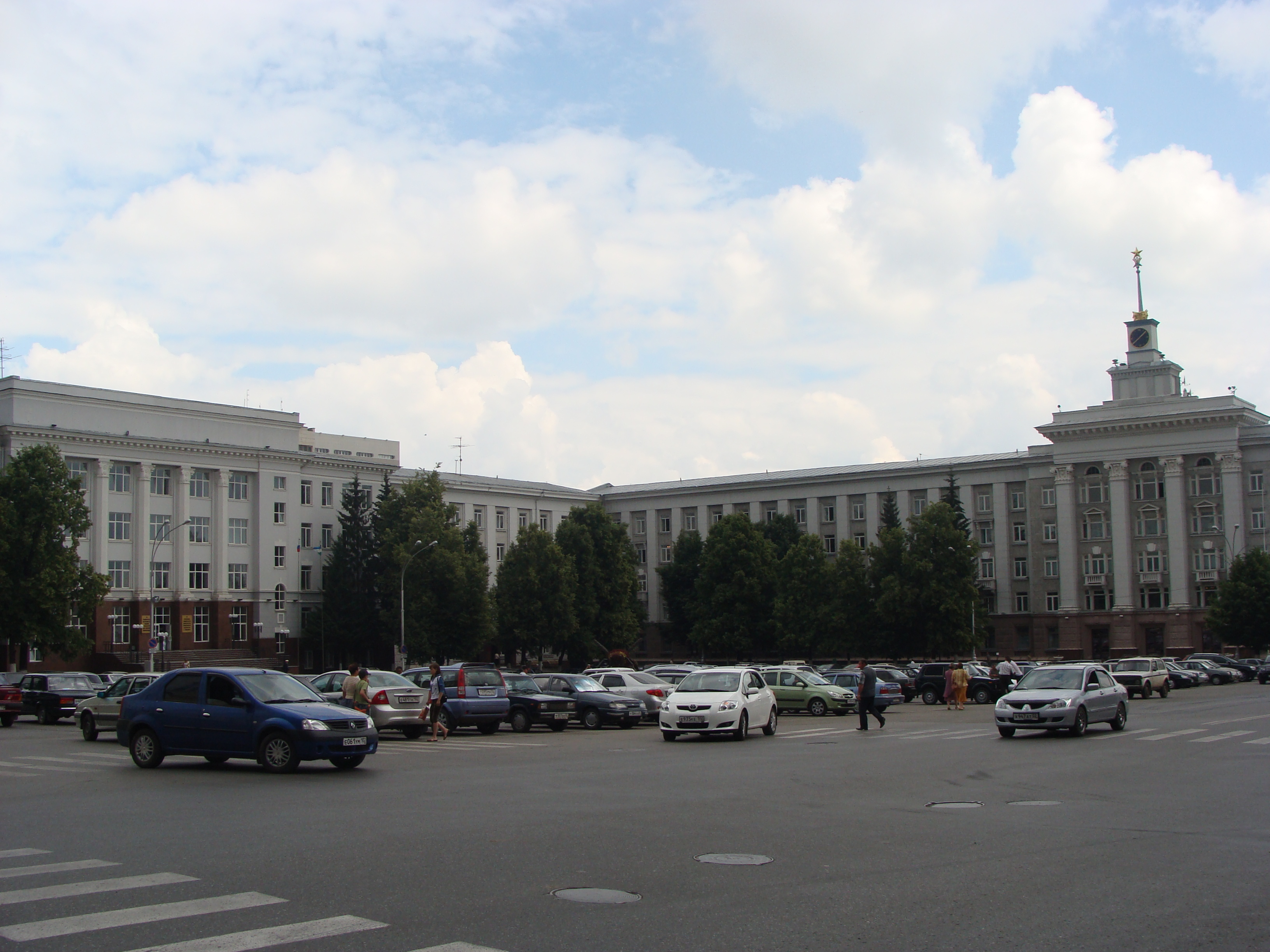
- Building of State Committee pictured in 2008

Agency overview
- Jurisdiction: Government of the Republic of Bashkortostan
- Headquarters: 18 Soviet street, Ufa, Republic of Bashkortostan

The State Committee for Transport and Roads is a Cabinet department in the Executive branch of the Republic of Bashkortostan government. It is the successor of the former Ministry of Construction, architecture and transport, which was split in State Committee for construction and architecture and State Committee for Transport and Roads in 2010 under President Rustem Khamitov.

== Mission ==
The Republic of Bashkortostan State Committee of Transport and Roads is working to strengthen the Transport and Roads market to bolster the economy and protect consumers;

State Committee of the Republic of Bashkortostan for Transport and Road Facilities

The State Committee of the Republic of Bashkortostan for Transport coordinates and regulates road facilities and passenger transportation. It optimizes transportation services, oversees cargo services, plans road activities, manages pricing policies, and ensures the safety of regional and inter-municipal motor roads.

== See also ==
- United States Department of Housing and Urban Development
