= Kebyachevo =

Kebyachevo Кебячево
- Village
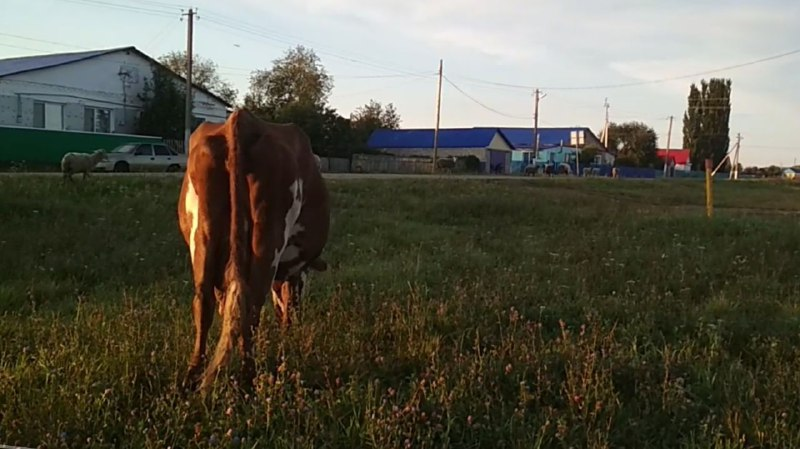

- Location within Bashkortostan Location within Russia
- Coordinates: 53°56′N 55°56′E
- Country: Russia
- Region: Bashkortostan
- District: Aurgazinsky District
- Time zone: UTC+5:00

Kebyachevo (Russian: Кебячево; Bashkir: Кәбәс, Käbäs; Tatar: Кәбәч, Käbäç) is a rural locality (a village) and the administrative centre of Kebyachevsky Selsoviet, Aurgazinsky District, Bashkortostan, Russia. The population was 289 as of 2010. There are 8 streets.

== Geography ==
Kebyachevo is located 12 km south of Tolbazy (the district's administrative centre) by road. Utarkul and Tashlykul are the nearest rural localities.
