= Supreme Court of Bashkortostan =

National supreme court

Supreme Court of The Republic of Bashkortostan
- Başkortostan Respublikahı Yuğarı Sudı
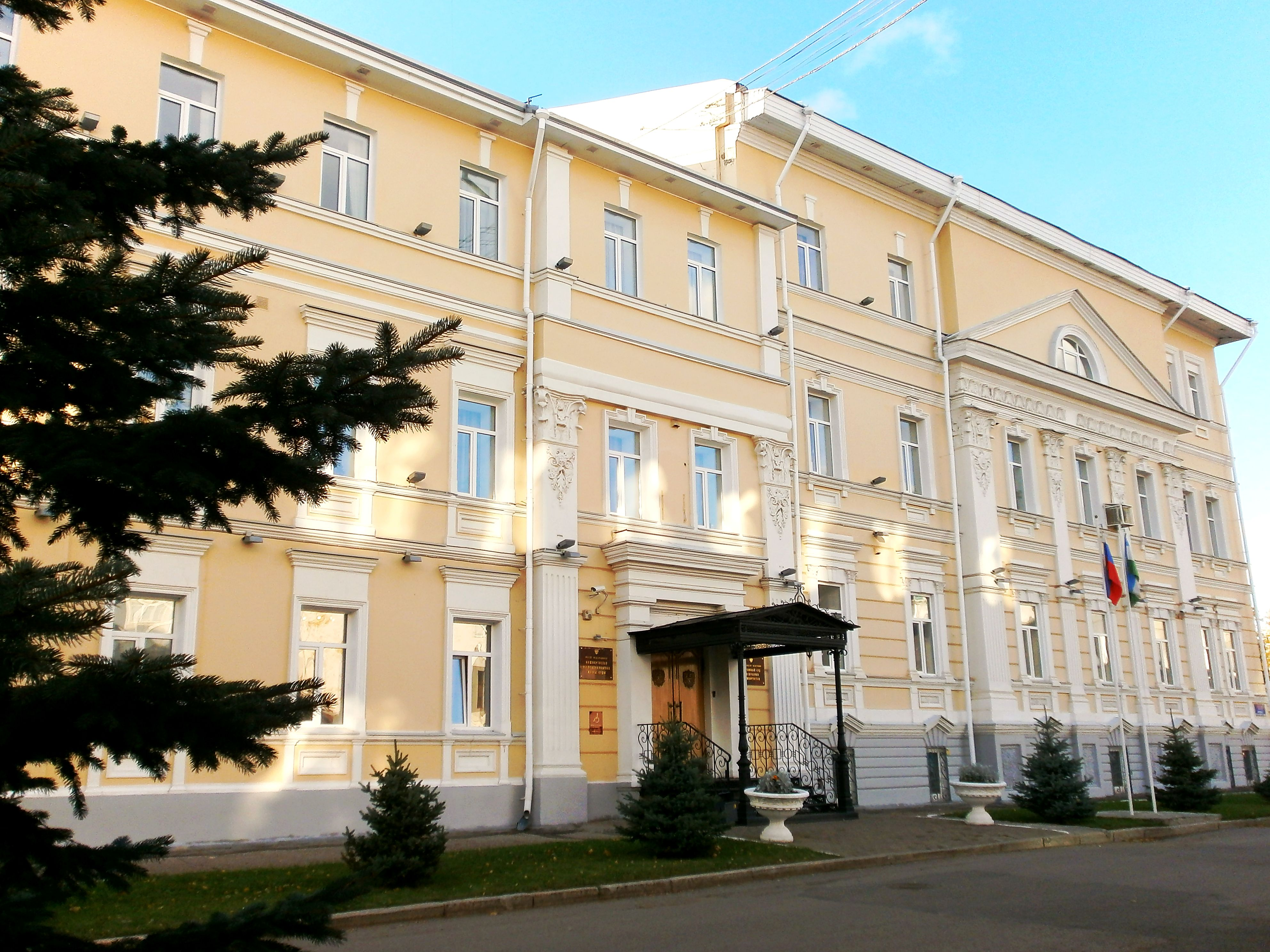
- Main building of the Supreme Court, 1, Matrosov Street, Ufa, 450002, Russia
- Interactive map of Supreme Court of The Republic of Bashkortostan
- 54.716762°N 55.946420°E
- Established: 23 December 1922
- Jurisdiction: Bashkortostan
- Location: Ufa, Sterlitamak
- Coordinates: 54.716762°N 55.946420°E
- Authorised by: Constitution of Russia, Constitution of Bashkortostan (in 1993–2000)
- Website: vs.bkr.sudrf.ru

Chief Justice
- Currently: Rail Shaydullin
- Since: 10 May 2023

Deputy Chief Justice
- Currently: Ivan Semyonov
- Since: 6 December 2018

Deputy Chief Justice
- Currently: Azat Gizatullin
- Since: 3 March 2022

The Supreme Court of the Republic of Bashkortostan (Bashkir: Başkortostan Respublikahı Yuğarı Sudı) is a regional court for the region of Bashkortostan. It is the court of last resort in Russian administrative law, civil law and criminal law cases. It also supervises the work of lower courts. Its predecessor is the Supreme Court of the Bashkir ASSR.

== Composition ==
There are 147 members of the Supreme Court. Supreme Court judges are nominated by the President of Russia. In order to become a judge, a person must be a citizen of Russia, be at least 35 years old, have a legal education, and have at least 10 years of service.

The Supreme Court consists of the Judicial Panel for Civil Affairs, the Judicial Panel for Criminal Affairs, and the Administrative Panel, which deal with respective cases. Those cases in which the Supreme Court is the original jurisdiction are heard by the panels. Appeals of the decisions of the panels are brought to the Cassation Panel. Whereas a panel reviews the decisions of lower courts, an appeal is brought to the Sixth Cassation Court in the city of Samara.

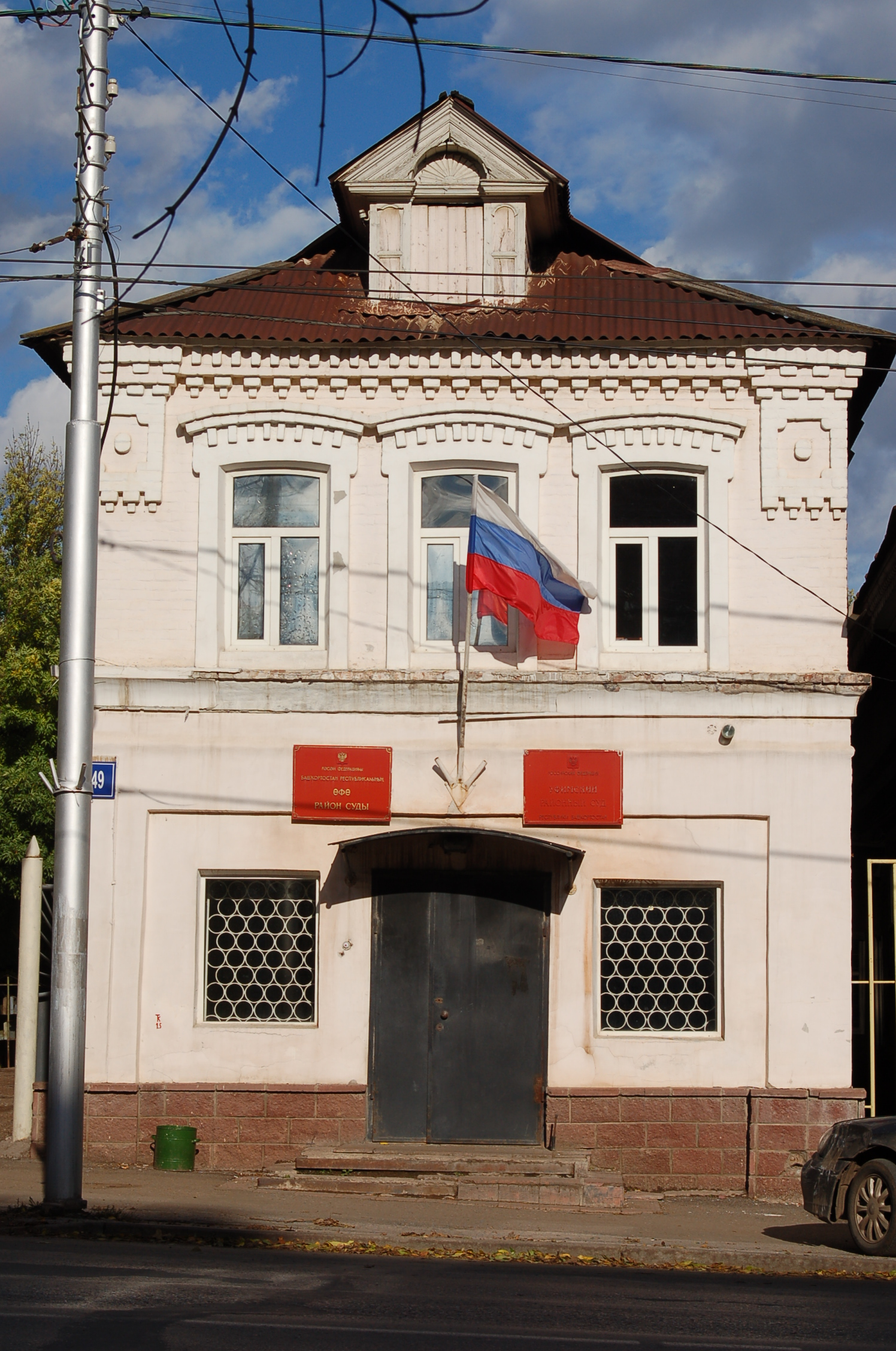
Ufa District Court is one of lower courts which Supreme Court of Bashkortostan are doing supervises work.

== Criticism ==
The Supreme Court has been the object of criticisms on a range of issues. Among them Court are a poor check on executive power, the Court has been criticized for keeping its deliberations hidden from public view, failing to protect individual rights. Court decisions have been criticized for failing to protect individual rights: Court has "become increasingly hostile to voters, especially poor and national minority voters".

The harassment of national minorities and political prisoners: In March 2017 Azamat Abutalipov, Aivar Khabibullin, Airat Ibragimov, Timur Munasypov and Shamil Khusnitdinov were sentenced at Ufa's October district court to suspended sentences under Article 282.2 of the Russian Federation (organisation of the activity of an extremist organisation). In June of that year the Supreme Court of Bashkortostan quashed the suspended sentences. In the judgment handed down in June 2017 in Ufa there is no evidence that those convicted were involved in acts of violence or in any other activity that would have violated human or civic rights. Memorial Human rights center had considered that the criminal prosecution of five Muslims from Bashkortostan is directly related to their religious beliefs and violates their right to freedom of conscience.

The Supreme Court of Bashkortostan had made more 100 decisions on which the complaint in the Bashkir language cannot be accept. In terms of the use of the Bashkir language it is illegal act and languages discrimination (see Directive 2000/43/EC, Indirect discrimination). Staff of Court not understand the Bashkir language and are noncapable of translating a citizen's appeal to Russian. The reason is that government officials in Bashkortostan do not accept appeals in the Bashkir language as a result of ethnic cleansing by federal authorities. The ethnic cleansing of the authorities in Bashkortostan is systematically carried out. People with Bashkir and Tatar surnames are accepted for State Federal service, with the condition that they do not need have to know Bashkir language.

== Disciplinary proceedings against a judges of The Supreme Court of Bashkortostan ==
The Qualification Board of Judges of The Republic of Bashkortostan was the body legally authorized to bring disciplinary proceedings against a judge. Qualification Collegia are bodies of judicial self-regulation that were established at the regional (Judicial Qualification Collegia) and national (Supreme Qualification Collegium) levels.

The Qualification Board of Judges of The Republic of Bashkortostan is composed of twenty-one members; thirteen of them are judges. Chief Federal Inspector for the Republic of Bashkortostan of the Office of the Plenipotentiary Representative of the President of Russia in the Volga Federal District is being member of Board too.

Through personal interviews, the holding of an examination and a review of documentation presented, the qualification board of judges determines the professional suitability, moral and professional qualities, level of knowledge and general attitudes of the candidates for inclusion on the roster of judges.

== Incidents ==
In the building of the Supreme Court on August 28, 2019, one of the participants in a civil case injured himself. After the court decision was made, the man "went out into the corridor and cut himself." The incident occurred in a building on Matrosova street, 1. The victim was hospitalized.

== See also ==
- Judiciary of Russia
- Constitutional Court of Bashkortostan
