= Ministry of Nature Management and Ecology =

Republic of Bashkortostan Ministry of Nature Management and Ecology
- Башҡортостан Республикаһы; Тәбиғәтте файҙаланыу һәм экология министрлығы

Agency overview
- Jurisdiction: Government of the Republic of Bashkortostan
- Headquarters: 28, Lenin Street, Ufa, 450006, Russia
- Website: https://ecology.bashkortostan.ru

The Ministry of Nature Management and Ecology of the Republic of Bashkortostan (Russian: Министерство природопользования и экологии Республики Башкортостан, Bashkir: Башҡортостан Республикаһы Тәбиғәтте файҙаланыу һәм экология министрлығы) is an agency of the government of Bashkortostan, headquartered in 28, Lenin Street, Ufa.

== Ministers ==
As of 2019 Head of the Ministry has been Ural Iskandarov.
