= Bashneft =

Russian oil company

Bashneft OAO
- Company type: Public (OAO)
- Traded as: MCX: BANE
- Industry: Oil and gas industry
- Founded: 1946; 80 years ago
- Headquarters: Ufa, Bashkortostan, Russia
- Key people: Nikolay Grakhantsev, (CEO)
- Revenue: $11.8 billion (2025)
- Operating income: $1.16 billion (2025)
- Net income: $557 million (2025)
- Total assets: $13.4 billion (2025)
- Total equity: $10.9 billion (2025)
- Owner: Rosneft (57.7%)
- Number of employees: 8,150
- Parent: Government of Russia
- Website: www.bashneft.com

Bashneft is a Russian oil company formed by the transfer of the oil related assets of the Soviet oil ministry in Bashkortostan to the regional government of the Republic of Bashkortostan by Boris Yeltsin. It was then privatized during 2002–3 by Murtaza Rakhimov, the president of Bashkortostan, an ally of Yeltsin's, with a controlling interest in Bashkir Capital, a holding company controlled by Rakhimov's son, Ural Rakhimov. In 2009 a controlling interest in Bashneft was acquired for $2 billion by Vladimir Yevtushenkov and placed in his holding company, Sistema, but in July 2014 he was jailed and 72% of Sistema's interest in Bashneft seized by the Russian government. Following seizure of the company in December 2014 Yevtushenkov was released from jail, "charges not proven," but Ural Rakhimov was reported to have fled the country. It is one of the larger producers of oil products in the country. The company operates 140 oil and natural gas fields in Russia and has an annual oil production of 16 million tonnes. Bashneft owns three oil refineries located in Ufa with a combined capacity of 820,000 bbl/d (130,000 m^{3}/d) and 100 petrol stations.

== History ==
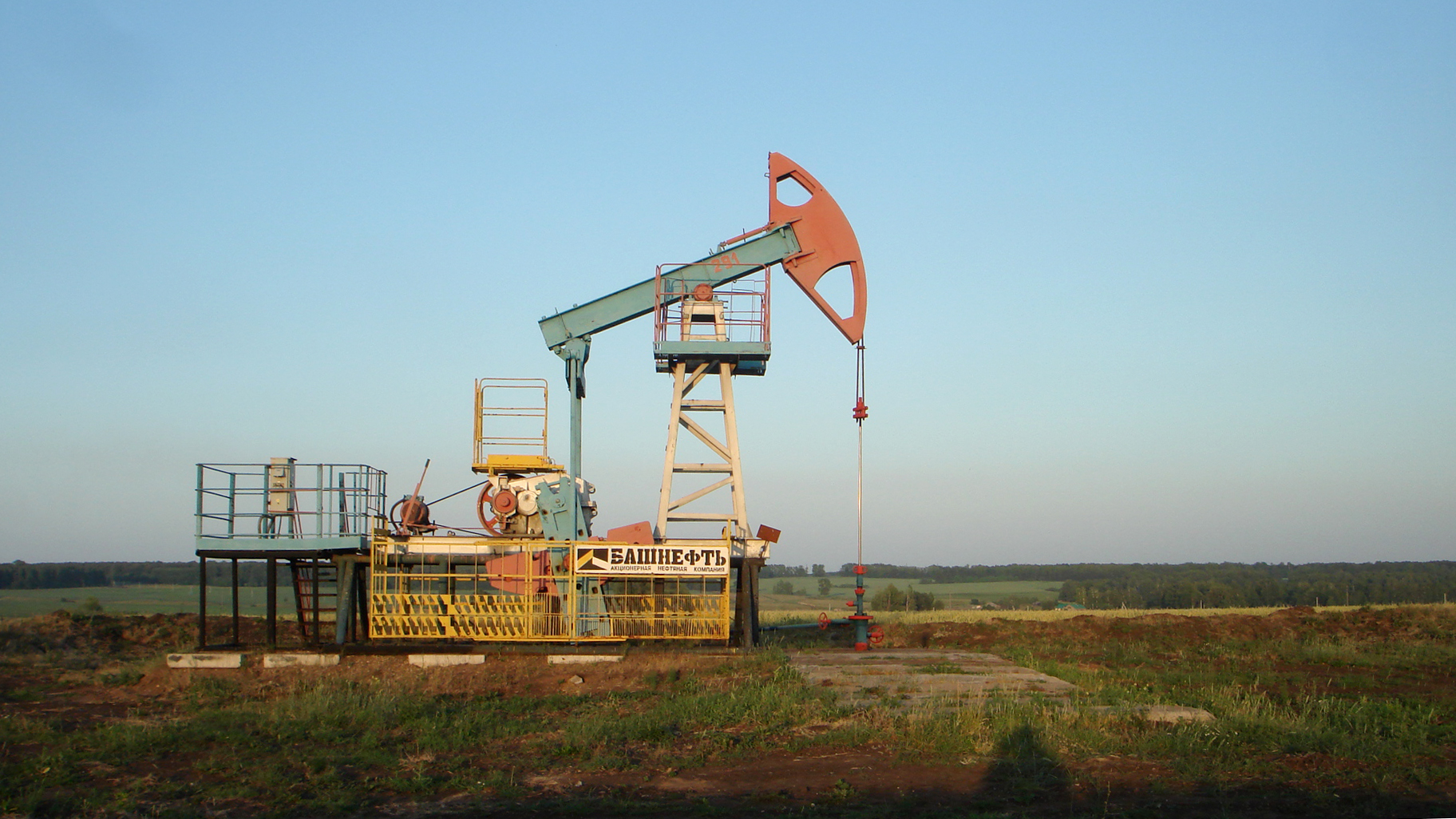
Bashneft oil pump in Bashkortostan

The Russian holding Sistema bought a controlling stake in Bashneft in March 2009 for US$2 billion. In March 2014, Bashneft acquired a 100% stake in Russian oil firm Burneftegaz in a deal totalling more than $1 billion.

Murtaza Rakhimov and Kadir Timergazin formerly worked for Bashneft.

In 2016, Bashneft was ranked as being among the 12th best of 92 oil, gas, and mining companies on indigenous rights in the Arctic.

Bashneft has been ranked no. 48 in the Arctic Environmental Responsibility Index (AERI) that covers 120 oil, gas, and mining companies involved in resource extraction north of the Arctic Circle.

On the website of PJSC Bashneft, after the introduction of International sanctions during the 2022 Russian invasion of Ukraine, information about members of the board of directors and the board of the company was deleted.

== See also ==
- Petroleum industry in Russia
- Russneft
- Trebs and Titov oil fields
