= Constitution of the Republic of Bashkortostan =

Supreme law of the Republic of Bashkortostan

Constitution of Bashkortostan
- Created: December 24, 1993
- Ratified: December 24, 1993 by the President of Bashkortostan
- Location: State Assembly of Bashkortostan, Ufa
- Author(s): State Assembly of Bashkortostan
- Purpose: The Constitution of the Bashkir Republic (1925)

The Constitution of the Republic of Bashkortostan (Russian: Конституция Республики Башкортостан, Bashkir: Башҡортостан Республикаһы Конституцияһы) is the supreme law of Bashkortostan, Russia. The Constitution delineates the national frame of government.

Its first three articles entrench the doctrine of the separation of powers, whereby the government is divided into three branches: the legislative, consisting of the State Assembly of Bashkortostan; the executive, consisting of the Head; and the judicial, consisting of the Supreme Court and other courts.

The Constitution of Bashkortostan significantly changed dramatically. Pressure changes associated with the federal center. Recent amendments to the Constitution made in 2014: President of the Republic will be called the "head".

Also articles of the Constitution, concerning the Bashkir language not met: Ufa federal authorities do not perform signs and names in the language of the indigenous people.
