= Government of Bashkortostan =

Governing body of Bashkortostan in Russia

- Башҡортостан Республикаһы Хөкүмәте; Правительство Республики Башкортостан
- Coat of arms of the Republic of Bashkortostan
- Formation: 1993
- Founding document: Constitution of Bashkortostan
- Jurisdiction: Bashkortostan
- Website: pravitelstvorb.ru/en/

Legislative branch
- Legislature: State Assembly

Executive branch
- Leader: Head

Judicial branch
- Court: Supreme Court
- Seat: Ufa, Russia

The Government of Bashkortostan (Bashkir: Башҡортостан Республикаһы Хөкүмәте; Russian: Правительство Республики Башкортостан) is a governing body of Bashkortostan in Russia which exercises executive power under the authority of the Republic Head whom appoints cabinet which is composed of the Prime Minister, the deputy prime ministers, and the ministers that are approved by the governing legislature is the State Assembly.

The government has its legal basis within the Constitution of the Republic of Bashkortostan.

== History ==
On 20 December 1917, the supreme body of executive power of Bashkurdistan–Bashkir Government (Government of Bashkurdistan) was formed by the Pre-Parliament of the Kese Qoroltay. The government consisted of the chairman and heads of departments (military, internal affairs, agriculture, public education, communications, insurance, financial, economic, justice).

In March 1919, after the signing of the "Agreement of the central Soviet power with the Bashkir government on the Soviet Autonomous Bashkiria", on the basis of the Provisional Revolutionary Committee of the Republic, the Bashkir Military Revolutionary Committee (Bashrevkom) was formed. The structure of the Bashrevkom included the chairman, people's commissars of the ASBR, the chairman of the Economic Council of the ASBR, heads of the information-agitation-organizational and distribution departments.

In July 1920, in accordance with the decree of the All-Russian Central Executive Committee and the Council of People's Commissars of the RSFSR "On the state structure of the Autonomous Soviet Bashkir Republic", the Council of People's Commissars (Sovnarkom, Government) of the Bashkir ASSR was formed. The composition of the Council of People's Commissars was elected at the congresses of the Soviets of the Autonomous Republic. The Council of People's Commissars was accountable to the Congress of Soviets and the Central Executive Committee of the Bashkir ASSR.

By the Decree of the Presidium of the Supreme Soviet of the Bashkir ASSR "On the transformation of the Council of People's Commissars of the Bashkir ASSR" dated 26 March 1946, the Council of People's Commissars was transformed into the Council of Ministers, and the People's Commissariats into the Ministries of the Autonomous Republic. The Council of Ministers was formed by the Supreme Soviet of the Bashkir ASSR. In 1990, the Council of Ministers of the Bashkir ASSR was transformed into the Council of Ministers of the Bashkir SSR, and in 1992–the Council of Ministers of the Republic of Bashkortostan, in 1993–the Cabinet of Ministers of the Republic of Bashkortostan, in 2002–the Government of the Republic of Bashkortostan.

== Agencies and offices ==
- Infrastructure Development
- Agriculture and Forestry
- Financial, Property and Contract Relationship Management
- Economic Development
- Youth Policy, Sport and Interaction with Administrative Agencies
- Industry, Business, Environment, Tourism, and Information Technology
- Planning, Analysis, and Control
- Regional Project Office

== Functions ==
- The Bashkortostan Government carries out, within the limits of its powers, leadership of the executive authorities of the Republic of Bashkortostan;
- Develops and implements programs of socio-economic and national-cultural development of the Republic of Bashkortostan;
- Develops and implements the republican budget; Carries out measures to ensure the comprehensive socio-economic development of the Republic of Bashkortostan, to pursue a unified state policy in the field of finance, science, education, health care, social security and environmental protection;
- Takes, in accordance with the legislation, measures to implement, ensure and protect human and civil rights and freedoms, protect public order and fight crime;
- Manages and disposes of the property of the Republic of Bashkortostan, as well as federal property transferred to the management of the Republic of Bashkortostan;
- Concludes agreements with federal executive authorities on the delimitation of subjects of jurisdiction and powers, as well as agreements on the mutual transfer of the exercise of part of their powers;
- Exercises other powers stipulated by the Constitution and laws of the Republic of Bashkortostan, agreements with federal executive bodies provided for in Article 78 of the Constitution of the Russia.

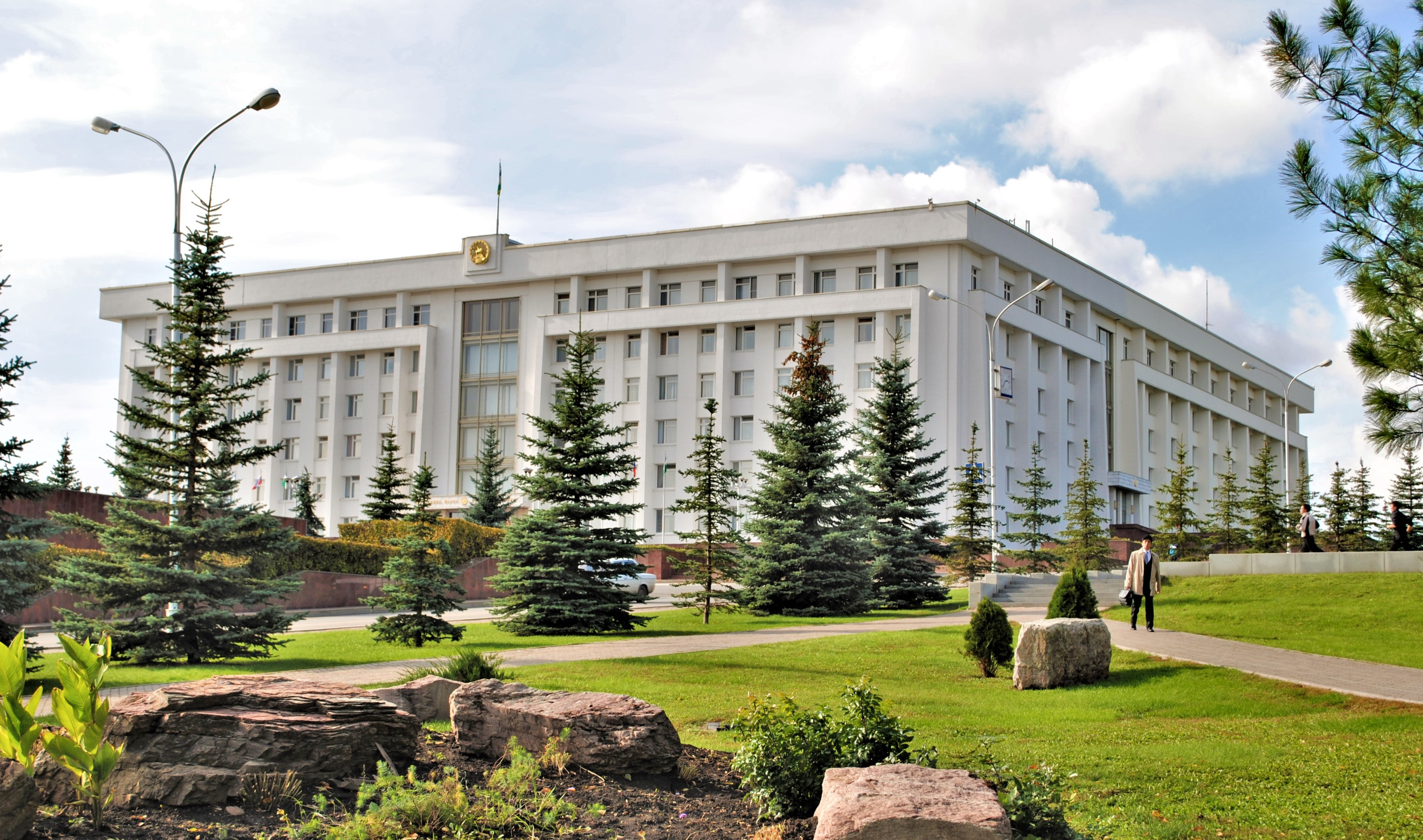
Building of the Government of the Republic

== Agencies ==
=== Ministry ===
1. Health
2. Housing and Communal Services
3. Land and Property Relations
4. Culture
5. Forestry
6. Youth and Sports
7. Education
8. Nature Management and Ecology
9. Industry and Innovation Policy
10. Agriculture
11. Family, Labour and Social Welfare
  1. Management of the State Employment Service
12. Finance
13. Economic Development

=== State committees ===
1. Housing and Building Oversight
2. State Committee on Tariffs
3. Construction and architecture
4. Justice
5. Trade and Consumer Protection
6. Transport and Roads

=== State departments ===
1. Press and Mass Media
2. Tourism
3. Information Technologies
4. Veterinary Office
5. Record Office
6. Office of Vital Records
7. Management Control and Supervision of Education
8. Organization of magistrates and maintaining registers of legal acts
9. Inspection of the technical state of self-propelled machines and other equipment
10. Inspection of the state construction supervision of the Republic of Bashkortostan located at Ulitsa Stepana Khalturina, 28, Ufa, 450059.

Federal authorities in the Republic of Bashkortostan
	Title	Director	address	Web site
1	Federal Service for Supervision of Communications, Information Technology and Mass Media in the Republic of Bashkortostan	Seknin Alexander Leontievich	50 years of October, 20/1, Ufa, Bashkortostan, 450005	https://02.rkn.gov.ru/
2	Federal Compulsory Medical Insurance Fund of Russia in the Republic of Bashkortostan	Kofanova Julia Anatolyevna	st. Lenin, 37, Ufa, Resp. Bashkortostan, 450077	https://tfoms-rb.ru/
3	Bashkir region of the Kuibyshev Railway	Novikov Dmitry Viktorovich	450015, Russia, Republic of Bashkortostan, Ufa, K. Marx, 69	not available
4	Ministry of Internal Affairs of Russia in the Republic of Bashkortostan	Deev Roman Viktorovich	450000, Russia, Republic of Bashkortostan, Ufa, Lenina, 7	https://02.xn--b1aew.xn--p1ai/
5				
