= List of Bashkirs =

This is a partial list of ethnic Bashkir people.

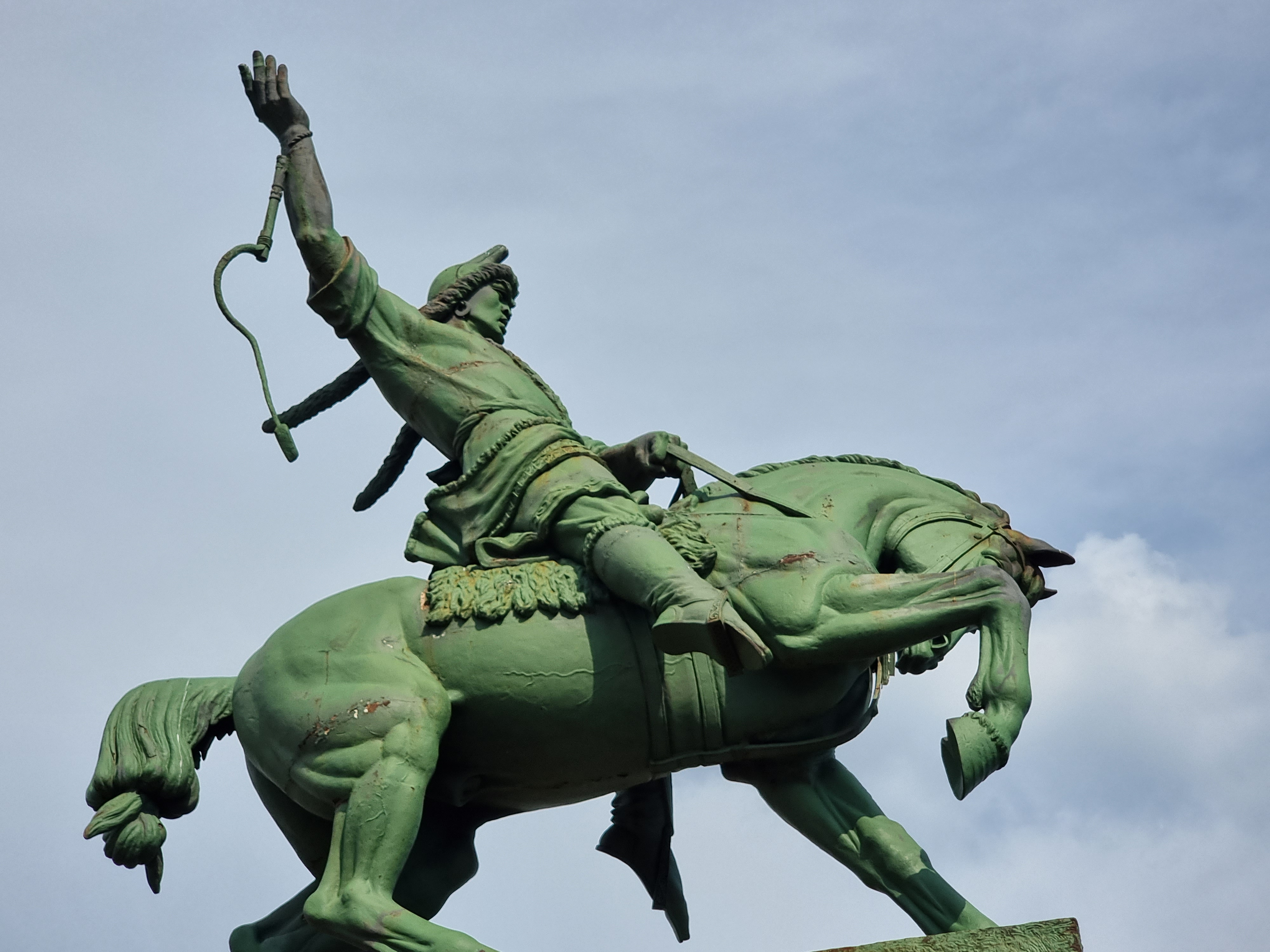
The monument for the national hero of Bashkortostan, Salawat Yulayev, who led a rebellion against the Russian Empire.

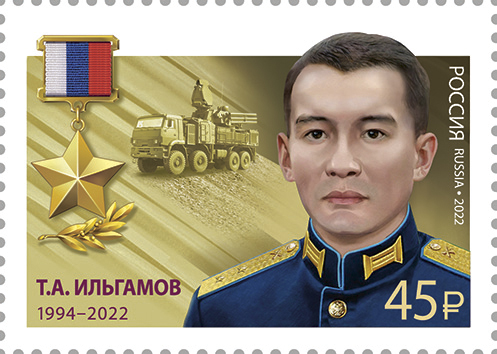
Russian postage stamp honoring a Bashkir soldier killed in Ukraine who was awarded the title of Hero of the Russian Federation.

== Business ==
- Ruslan Fazlyev, internet entrepreneur
- Salavat Fidai, sculptor
- Ural Rakhimov, oligarch

== Arts and culture ==
- Ildar Abdrazakov (born 1976), bass opera singer
- Aigul Akhmetshina (born 1996), mezzo-soprano opera singer
- Gaziz Al'mukhametov, tenor opera singer
- Roza Akkuchukova (1950–2021), pop singer
- Miftahetdin Akmulla (1831–1895), Bashkir poet and philosopher, famous for his patriotic chants and his philosophical publications
- Shaikhzada Babich (1895–1919), Bashkir poet, writer and playwright. Member of the Bashkir national liberation movement, one of the members of the Bashkir government (1917–1919)
- Mustai Karim (1919–2005), Bashkir Soviet poet, writer and playwright
- Zagir Ismagilov (1917–2003), composer and educator
- Yakup Kulmiy (1918–1994), poet
- Lyasan Utiasheva (born 1985), TV show host, socialite and former rhythmic gymnast
- Alina Ibragimova (born 1985), violinist
- Morgenshtern (born 1998), rapper and internet personality
- Beder Yusupova (1901–1969), Soviet Bashkiria actress, teacher

== Military ==
- Musa Gareyev (1922–1987), twice Hero of the Soviet Union
- Salawat Yulayev (1756–1800), Bashkir national hero
- Shagit Hudayberdin, Communist revolutionary
- Tagir Kusimov (1909–1986), Soviet military leader

== Politics ==
- Zekeria Aknazarov, Communist party leader
- Murtaza Rakhimov, first president of Bashkortostan
- Rustem Khamitov, second president of Bashkortostan
- Radiy Khabirov, head of Bashkortostan since 2018
- Zaynulla Rasulev, Jadid movement leader
- Zeki Velidi Togan, historian, Turkologist and leader of the Bashkir national movement of the early 20th century

== Sport ==
- Igor Abdrazakov, footballer
- Ilshat Aitkulov, football coach
- Rodion Amirov, ice hockey player
- Vener Galiev, amateur wrestler, sambist and mixed martial artist
- Adelina Ibatullina, pentathelete
- Aygul Idrisova, international draughts player
- Svetlana Ishmouratova, biathlete
- Shakir Mukhamadullin, ice hockey player
- Kamilla Rakhimova, tennis player
- Denis Shafikov, boxer
- Liliya Shobukhova, long-distance runner
- Tamara Tansykkuzhina, international draughts player
- Arthem Vakhitov, kickboxer
- Irek Zaripov, biathlete and cross-country skier
