= Artmuza =

Creative Cluster Artmuza
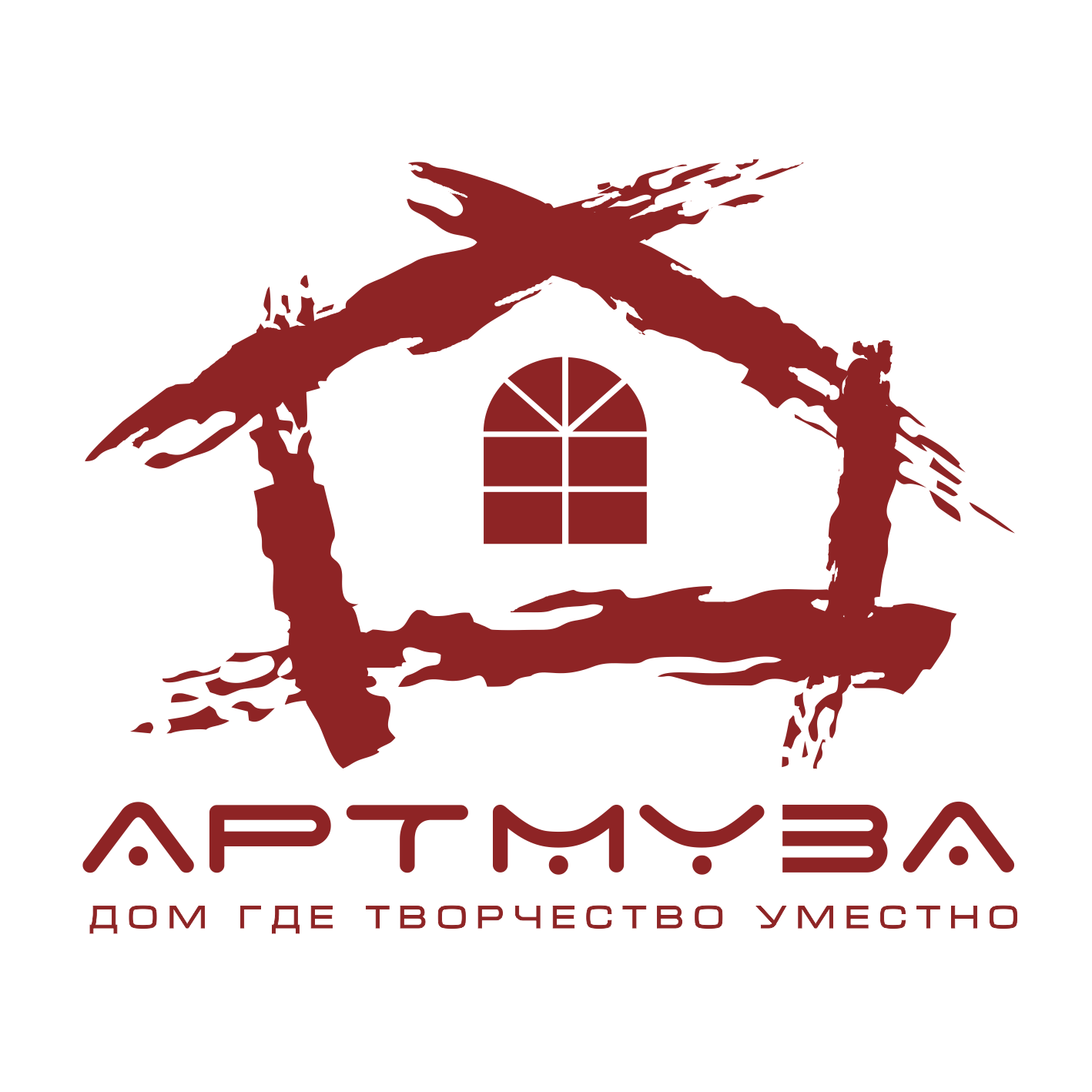

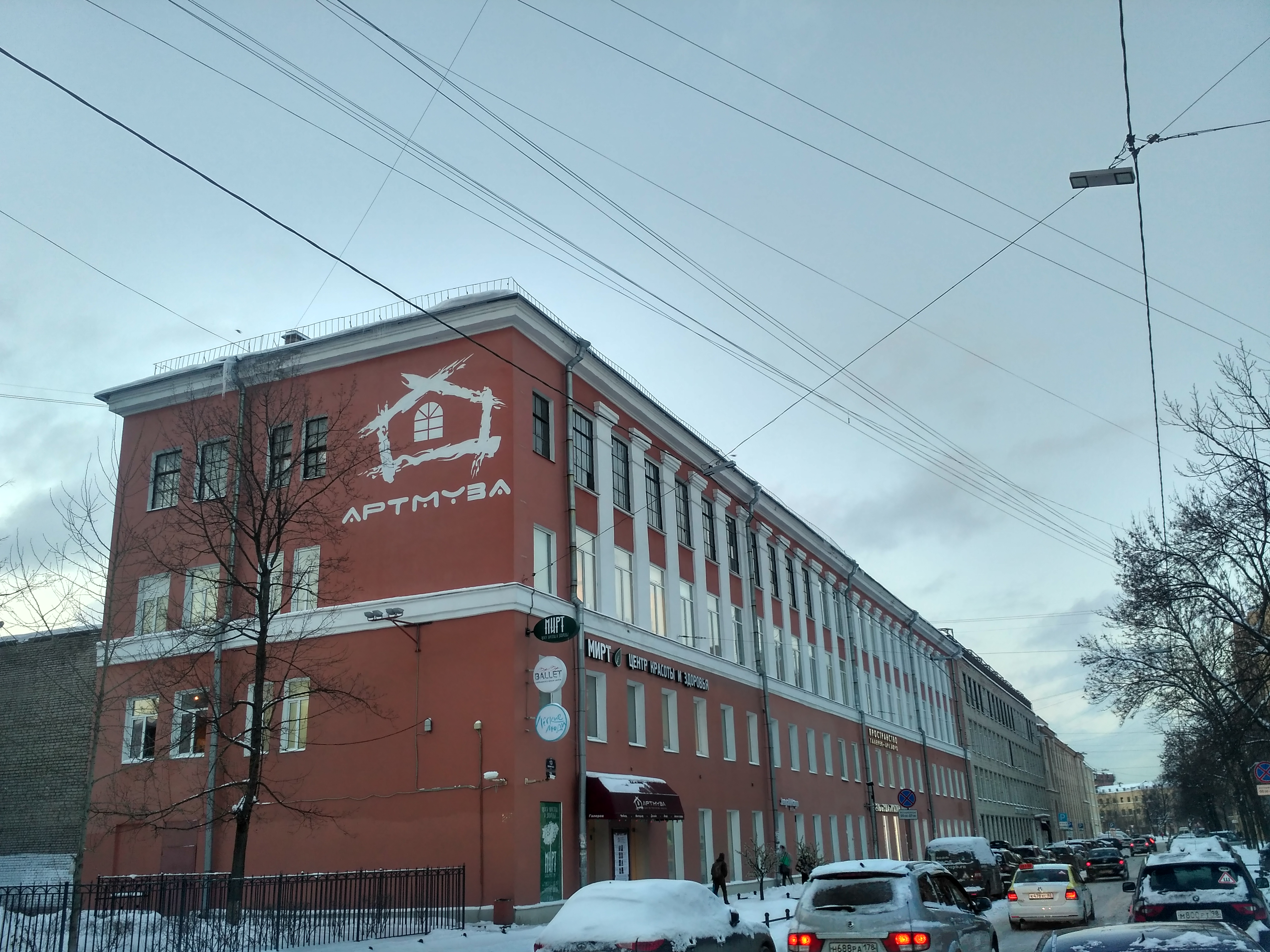
- Established: January 8, 2014; 12 years ago
- Location: Vasilyevsky Island, Saint Petersburg, RU
- Coordinates: 59°56′44″N 30°15′54″E
- Type: Art museum
- Website: artmuza.spb.ru

Artmuza is a contemporary art gallery and a creative space in Saint Petersburg on Vasilievsky Island in Russia. Since 2013, it has been at the location of the former factory of musical instruments "Muzdetal".

== History ==
The mechanical plant on the 13th line of Vasilyevsky Island was founded in 1938 and its first products were fireproof cabinets, beds and counters. Until 1991, the company produced sports equipment, bearings, toys and board games. Since 1991, the plant is called "Muzdetal" and is redeveloped for the production of acoustic guitars.

After a falling demand for musical instruments, the enterprise was transformed into a business center. The premises were leased to various enterprises. After the 2008 financial crisis, tenants left the building and creative spaces opened. Since 2013, Artmuza started operating as an exhibition hall. The official opening was on January 8, 2014. Since the first years of museum, the contest of young artists "The Muse Must Work" is held there.

== Projects and exhibitions ==
Nikolai Blokhin (January 8 – February 20, 2014), Alex Andreev (Project Generator of Universes, together with Igor Ivanov), Roman Lyapin, Ben Heine, Dmitry Strizhov, Andrei Sikorsky, Paul Nickleen were exhibited in Artmuza.
