= Alex Andreev =

Russian artist (born 1972)

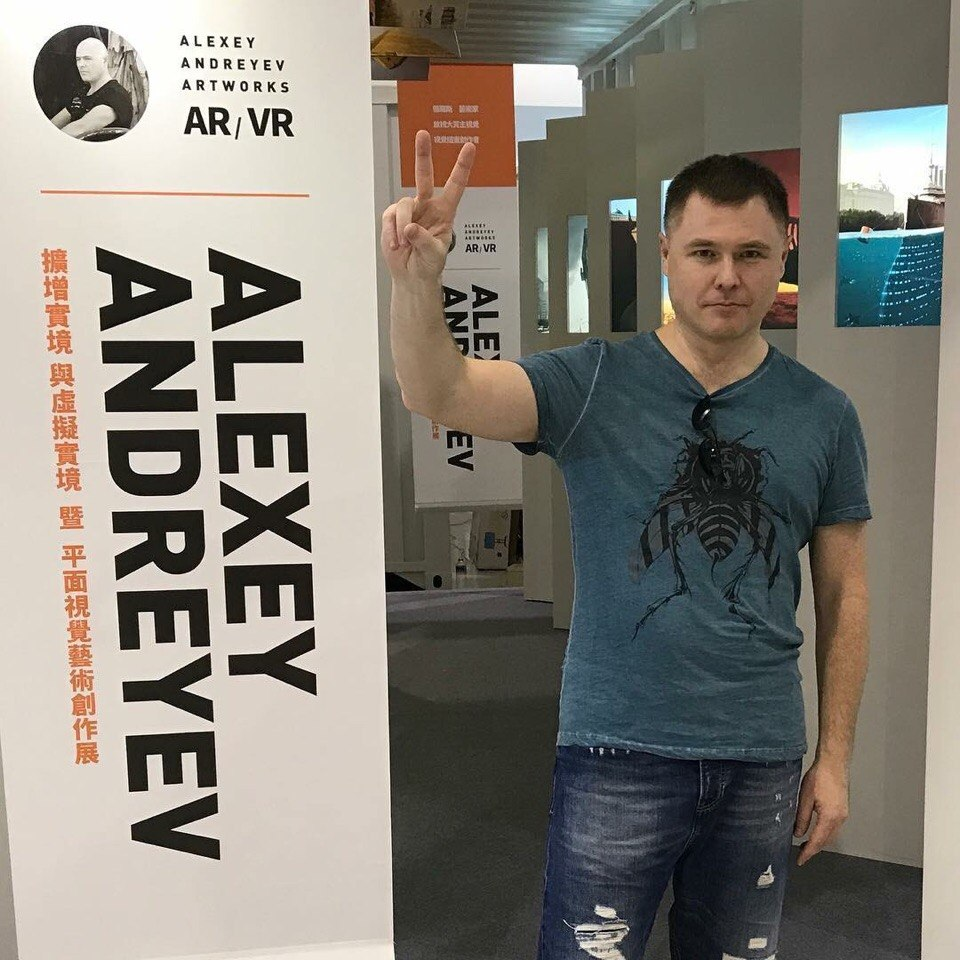
- Born: 1972 (age 53–54); Chudovo
- Website: http://alexandreev.com/

Alex Andreev (born 1972 in Chudovo) is a Russian artist working in digital painting, using virtual and augmented reality in his artworks.

== Biography ==
Alex Andreev was born in Chudovo, Novgorod region in 1972. In 1994 he graduated from the Novgorod State University, Faculty of Architecture and Design. Since 1989 he has been creating artworks in traditional graphic technics, using pen ink and a pencil In 2008 he turned to digital painting. Using Adobe Photoshop, he has been creating personal artworks as well as movie concept arts. In 2016 he provided concept arts for "The Roadside Picnic", at the same time creating artworks including augmented and virtual reality. Since 2018 he has been creating 3D digital artworks in the space of virtual reality by virtual sculpturing through the Oculus Medium. Now he is an art director of Spheroid Universe project, who is supervising the augmented reality installations made by the artists. His artworks are shown in the State Museum of Urban Sculpture as well as in the UGallery, USA.

== Creation ==
=== Painting ===
Alex Andreev is considered as a surrealist. He works in the technique of digital painting and creates artworks in virtual and augmented reality. His illustrations represent the image of the near future intertwined with modern reality. He devoted a series of pictures to the St Petersburg where he is living at the moment.

=== Cinema ===
- Full-length animated film, directed by George Danelia: backgrounds art director and senior concept artist
- "Zone" TV series based on the story of A. and B. Strugatsky " The Roadside Picnic" (production designer)
- 2014 Twisted Dagger, an unreleased television series based on works by Lovecraft (concept artist)
- 2016 "The Roadside Picnic", a television series-screen version of the Strugatsky brothers' " The Roadside Picnic", Sony Pictures, directed by Alan Taylor (concept artist)

=== publications ===
The author of the book covers of the complete works of Arkady and Boris Strugatsky

A Separate Reality Artbook

Publications in the magazines Magic-CG, Advanced Creation Photoshop

=== Augmented reality ===
Andreev's artworks can be "brought to life" by the special app: point the camera of your smartphone on the picture to make the sound and the video appear.

== Gallery ==
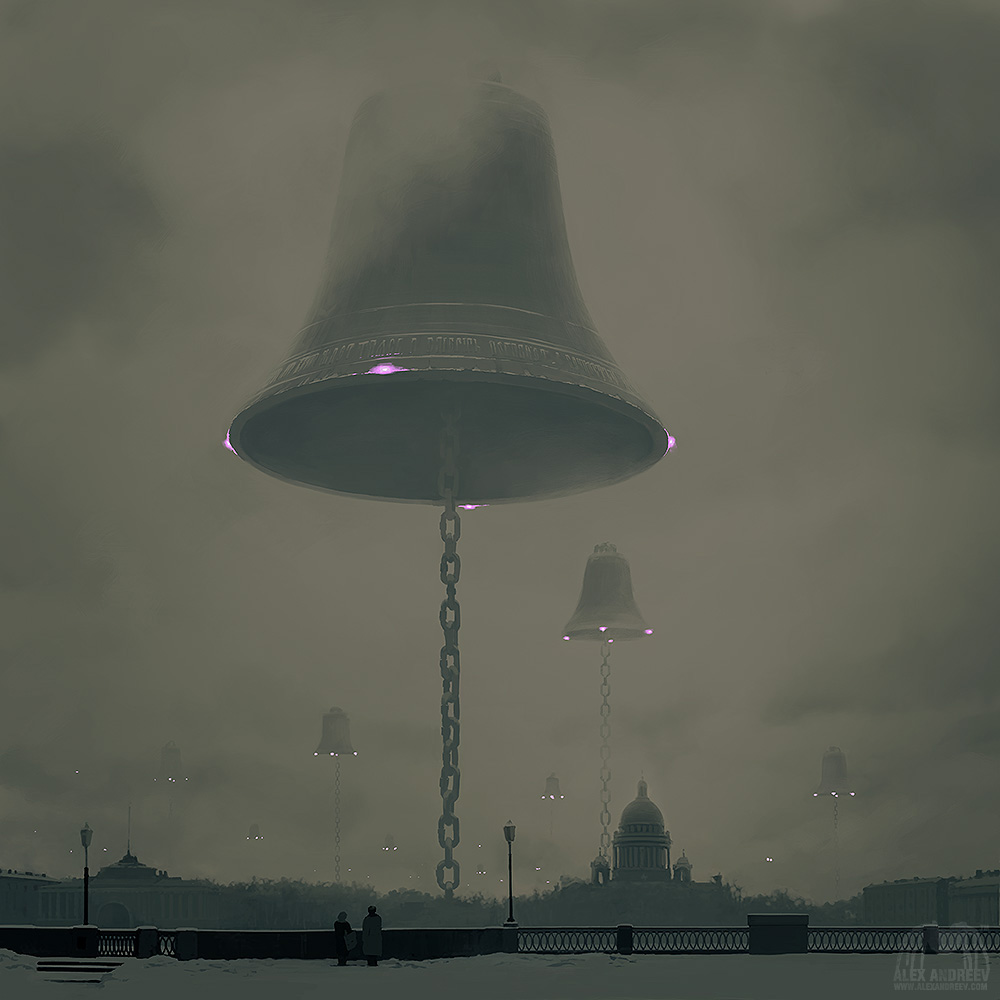
Dome 2016

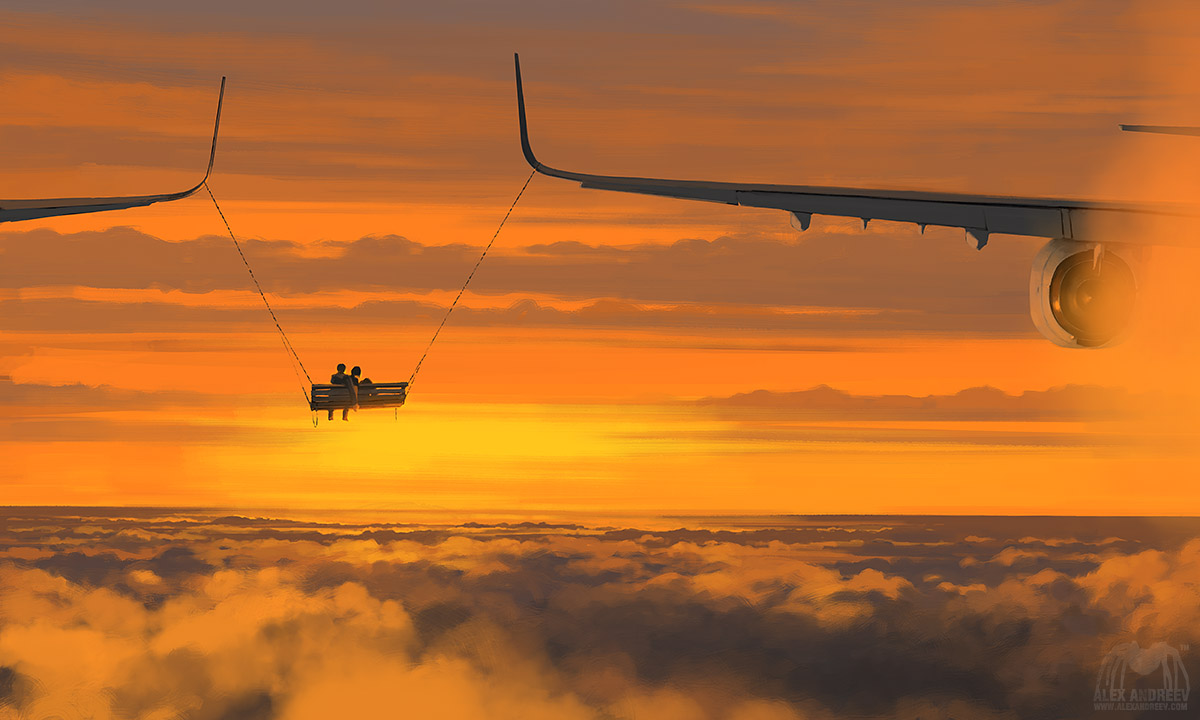
Teeter-Totter 2016

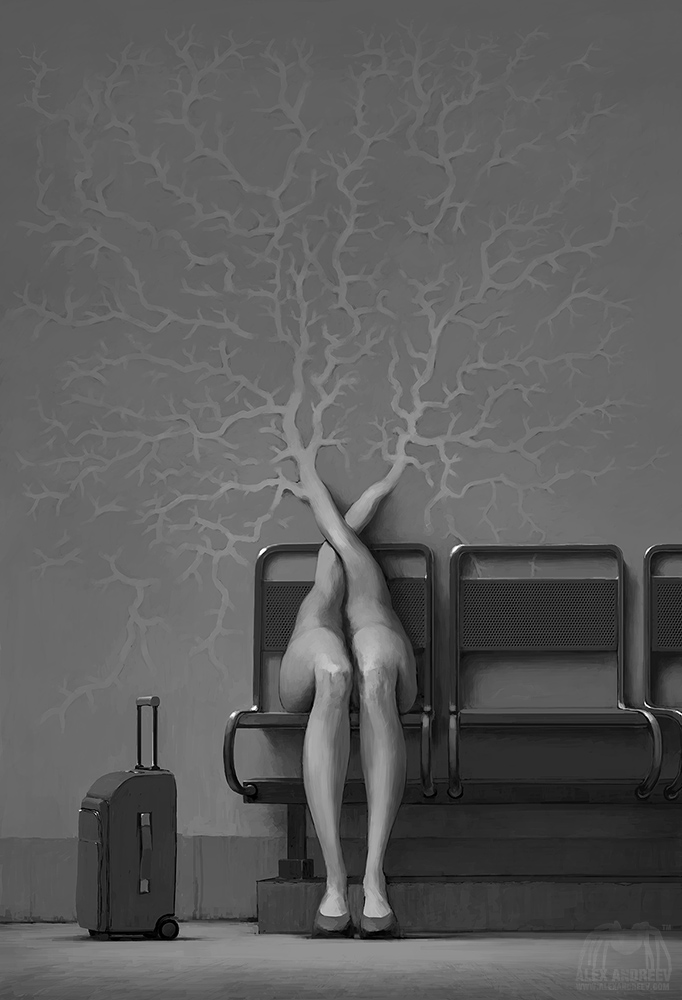
Waiting 2016

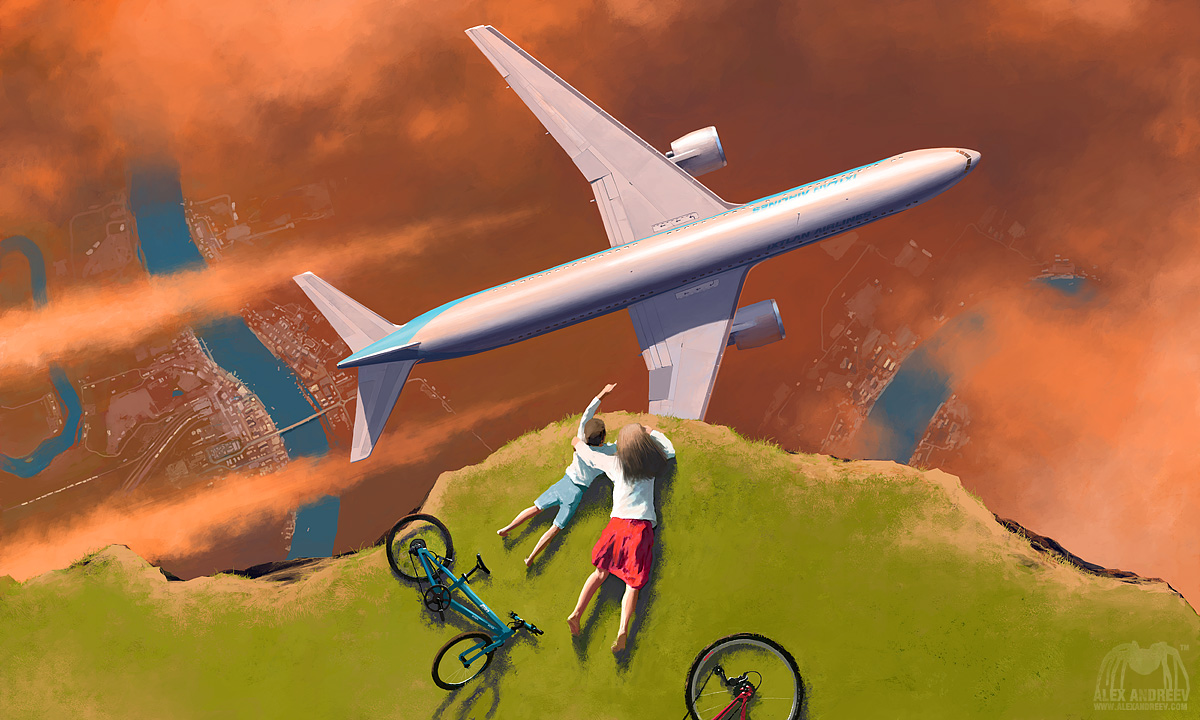
Pilots 2015

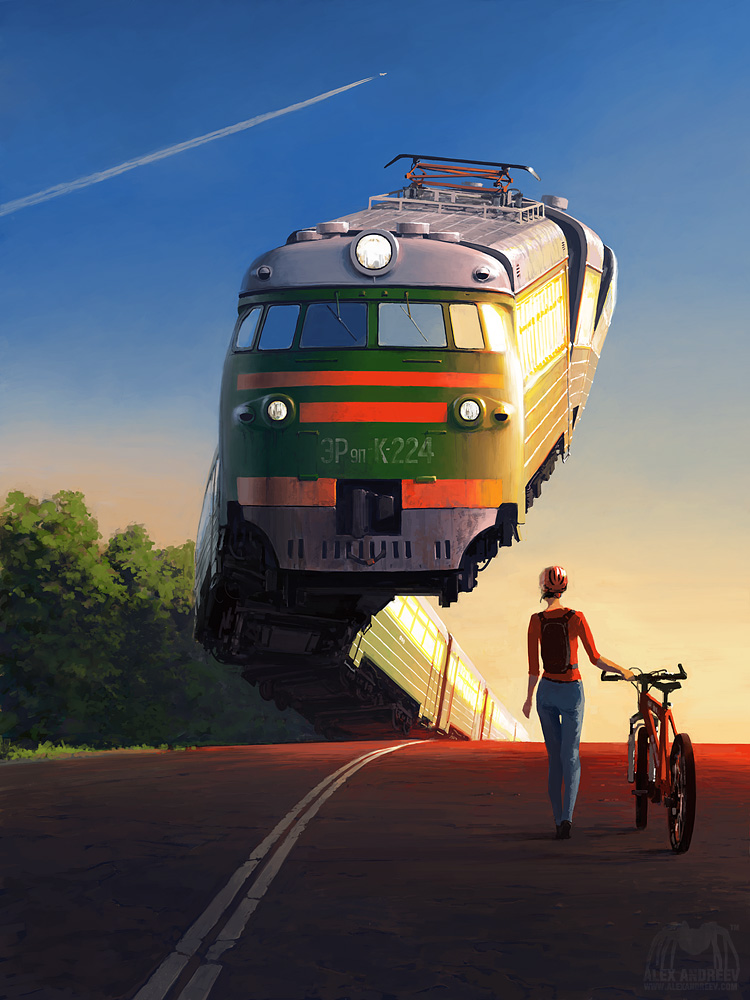
Vesper 2015

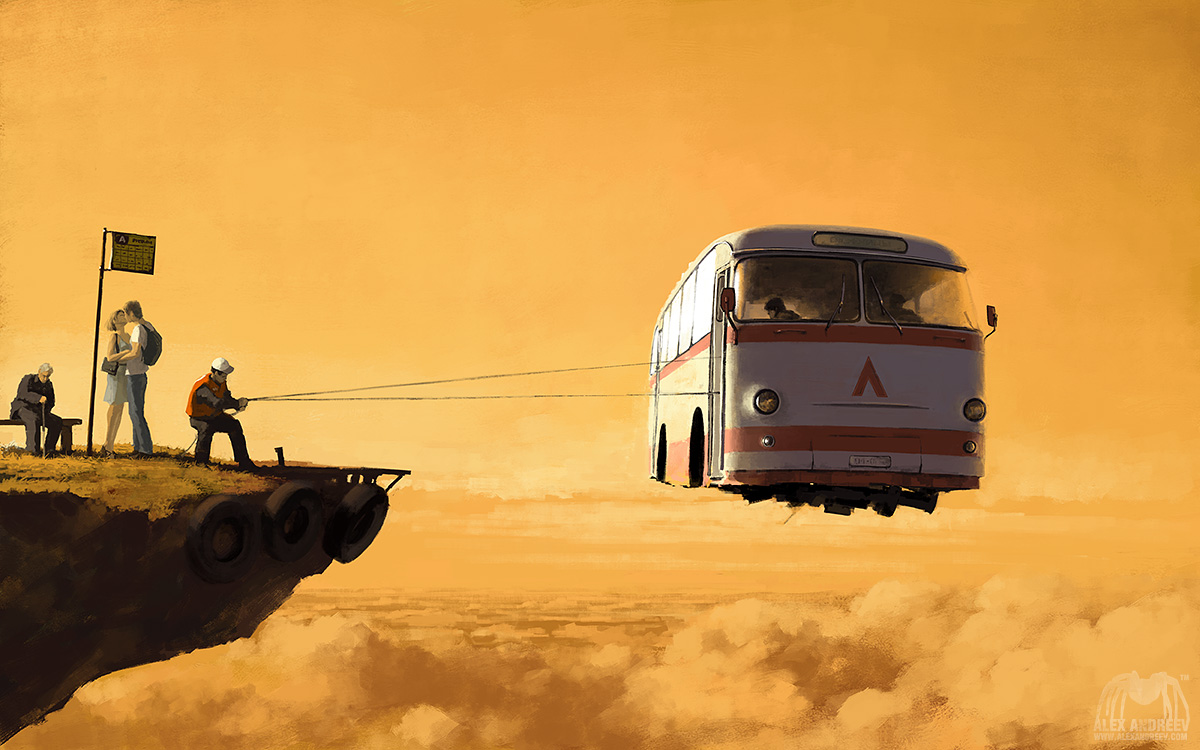
Route Two 2016

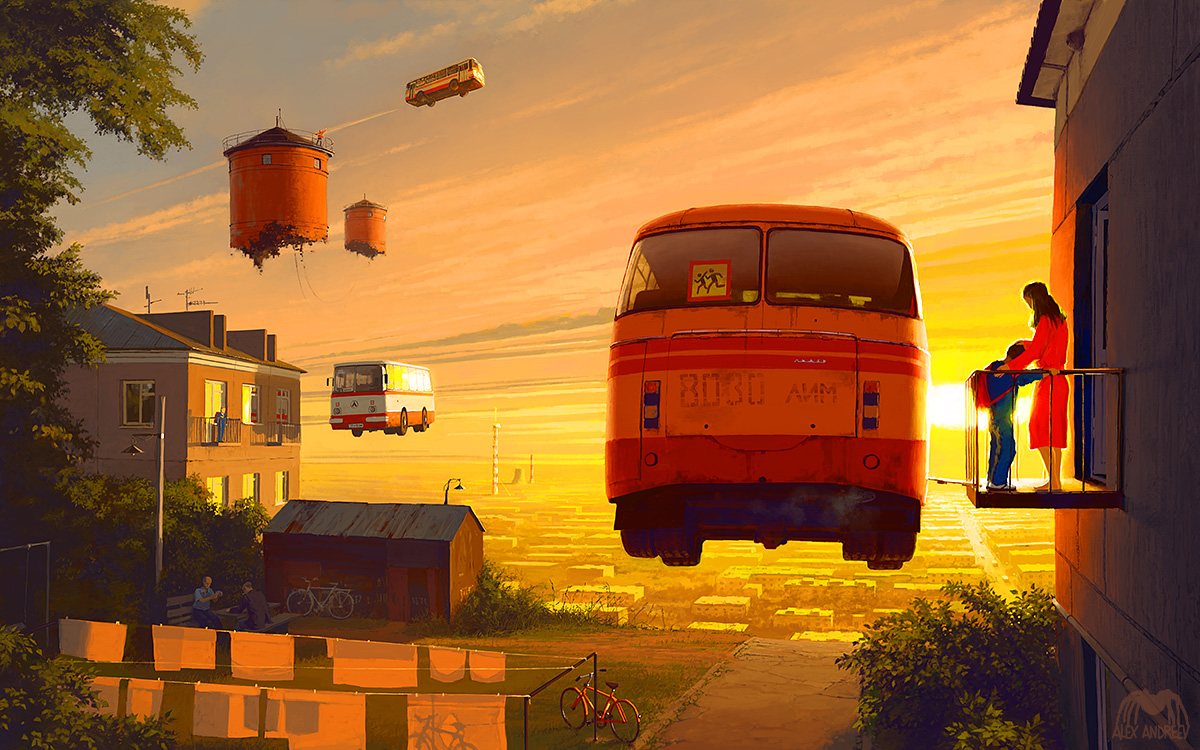
Homeland, 8:00 2017

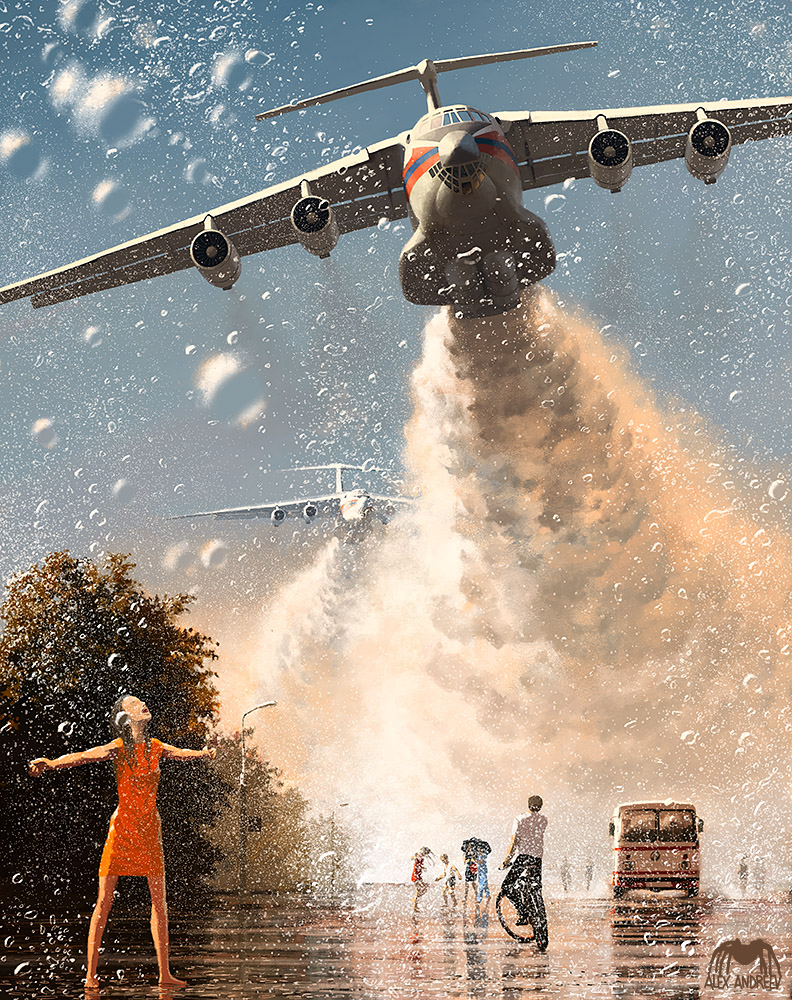
Water Day 2017

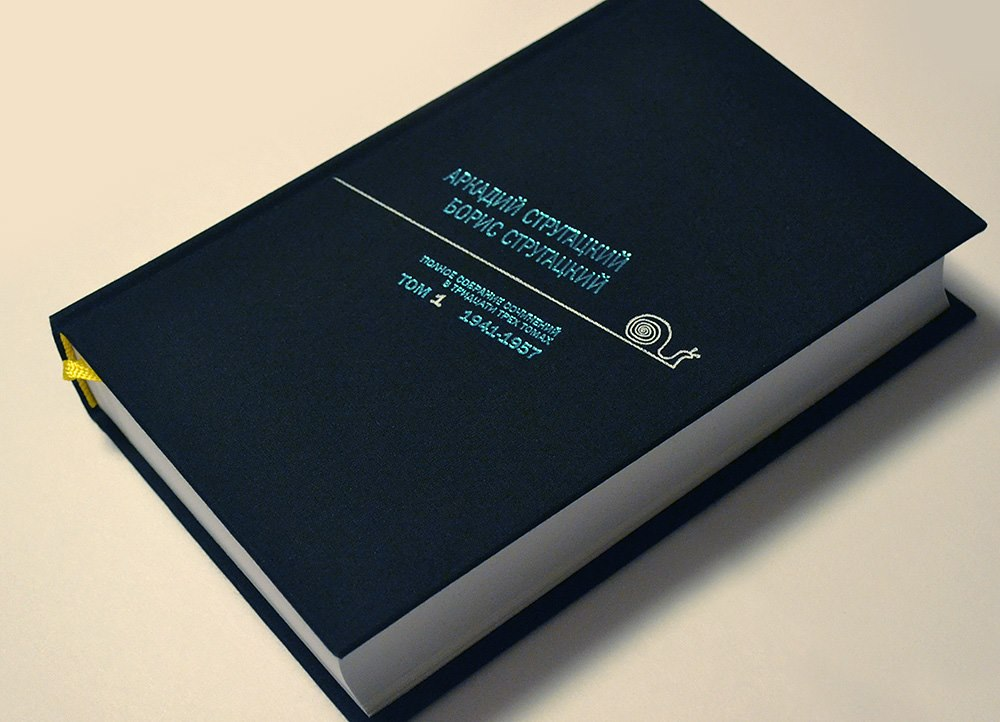
Book cover

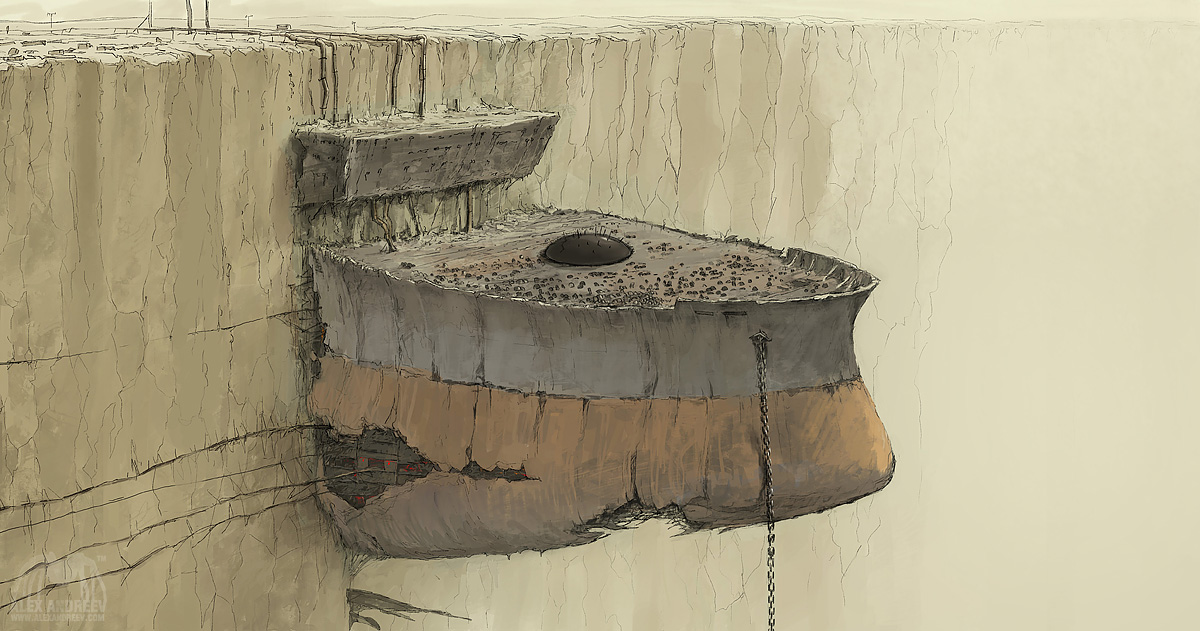
Концепт к Мультфильму «Ку! Кин-Дза-Дза» 2010

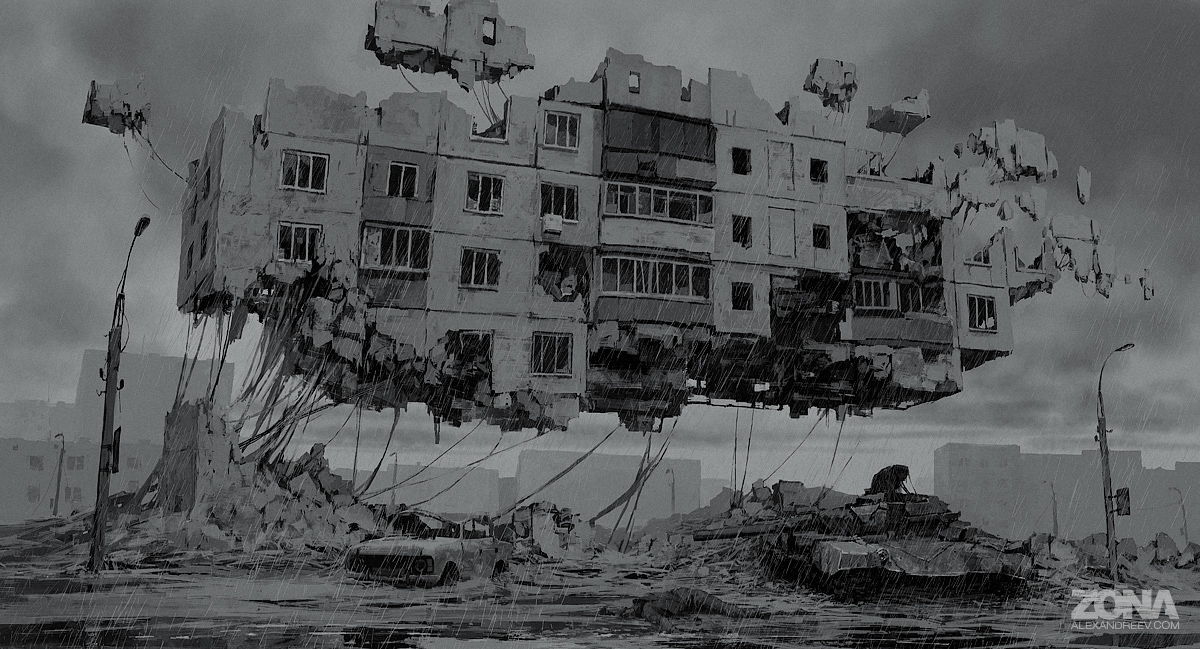
Концепт к сериалу«Зона» 2014

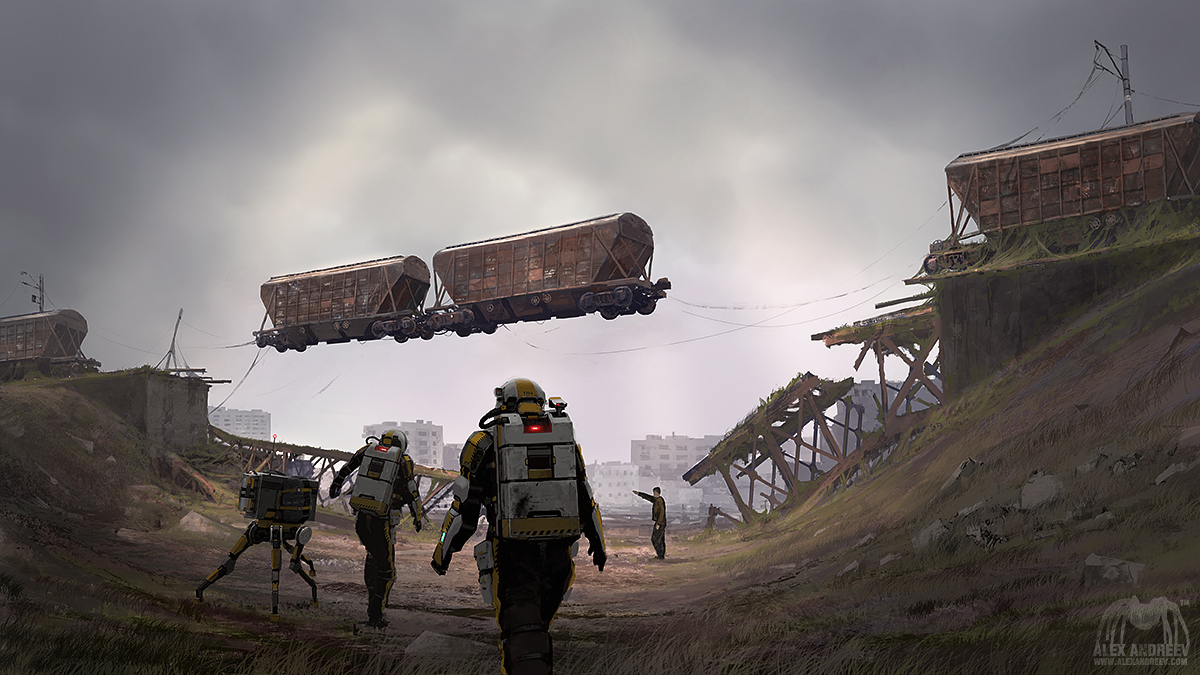
Концепт к сериалу «Пикник на обочине» 2015

Dome 2018

Commuter 2018

Something Here 2018

== Exhibitions ==
- 1993, Personal Exhibition, Novgorod State University, Veliky Novgorod
- 1993, ‘Black And White Dreams’ personal exhibition, Novgorod State University, Veliky Novgorod
- 2002, ‘Artist’s Head: Sectional View’ personal exhibition, Valencia Gallery, St. Petersburg
- 2014 Personal Exhibition, Center of Contemporary Arts, Veliky Novgorod, Russia
- 2014 "A Separate Reality', Personal Exhibition, Art gallery, Chudovo, Russia
- 2014 "A Separate Reality', Personal Exhibition, Kino Iluzion, Warsaw, Poland
- 2015 "Generator Of The Universes", Creative claster "Artmuza" (with Igor Ivanov), St. Petersburg, Russia
- 2015 "A Separate Reality', Personal Exhibition, Ausländerrat Dresden e.V., Drezden, Germany
- 2015 "Metronomicon", Erarta Contemporary Art Center, St. Petersburg, Russia
- 2015 Positive Hack Days
- 2015, Moscow, Russia
- 2015 "A Separate Reality', Personal Exhibition, Sevastopol, Russia
- 2016 Positive Hack Days
- 2016, Moscow, Russia
- 2017 Positive Hack Days
- 2017, Moscow, Russia
- 2017 AAD 2017, Kaohsiung, Taiwan
- 2017 "A Separate Reality', Personal Exhibition, Niebo Kopernika, Warsaw, Poland
- 2017 Games of Mind, St. Petersburg, Russia
- 2017 London Moll, St. Petersburg, Russia
- 2017 HR- tech conference, Nizhny Novgorod, Russia
- 2018 Erarta Contemporary Art Center, St. Petersburg, Russia
- 2018 AAD 2018, Kaohsiung, Taiwan
