= Salavat Fidai =

Russian sculptor

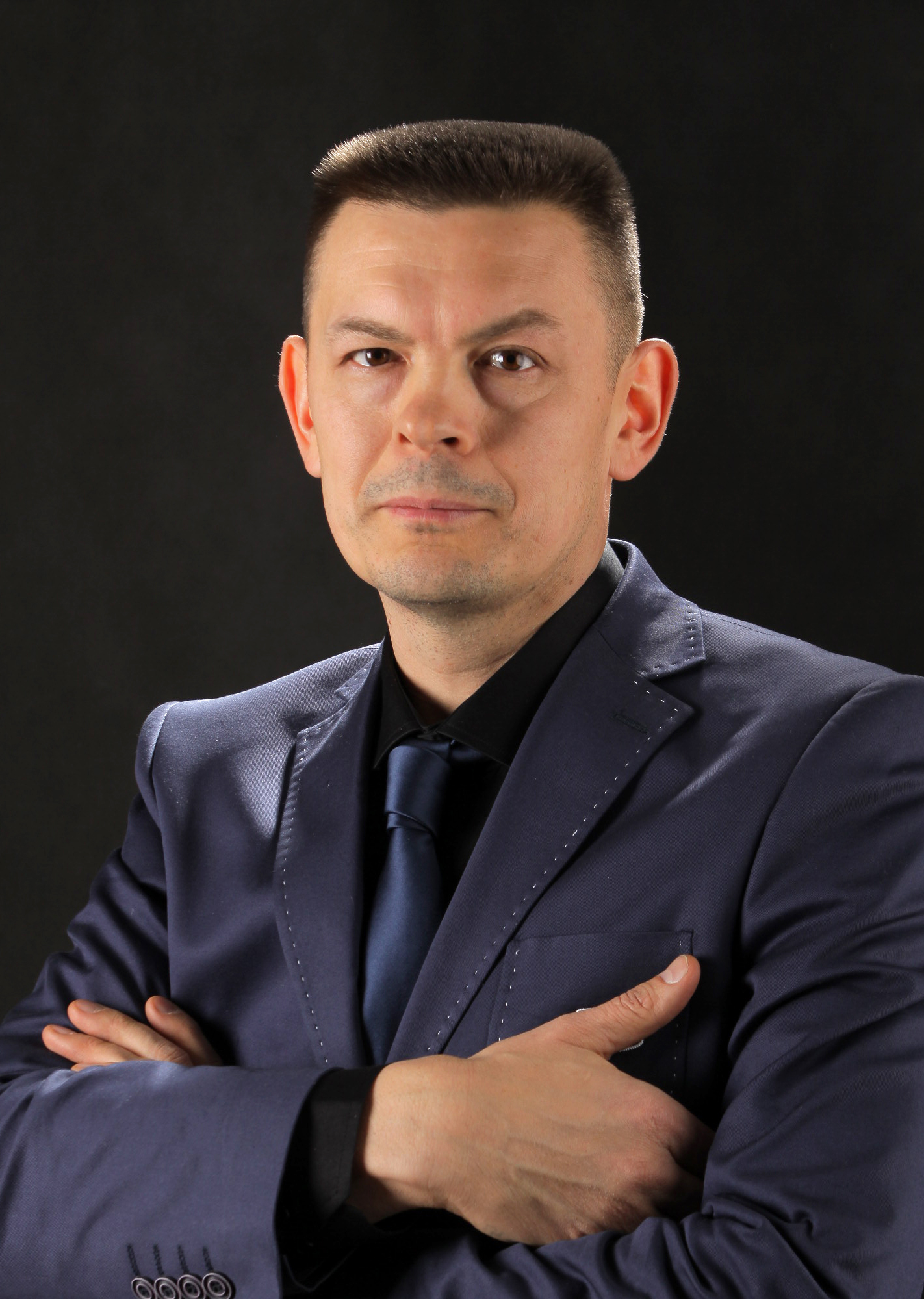
- Known for: Graphite sculptures
- Website: http://www.salavatfidai.art/

Salavat Fidai (Bashkir: Салауат Фидай улы Фидаи, Russian: Салават Фидаевич Фидаи) is a Russian sculptor who makes miniature sculptures out of pencil graphite. He currently lives in Ufa, Russia.

== Career ==
Fidai began his professional career as a lawyer and spent more than 25 years in this profession. In 2013, during the economic crisis in Russia, he changed occupations to work full-time as an artist.

He entered art through digital photography, focusing on still-life photographs of fruits and vegetables. This was compiled into a series titled, "The Quiet Life of Things." This series was presented at the exhibitions "Metropolitan History" in Moscow and "Eros: The Times and Faces" in St. Petersburg. In 2014, he experimented with expressionism and impressionism through paint. He created a series titled "The Rainy City," which was presented in 2015 at "The Muse Should Work" in St. Petersburg.

In 2014, Fidai started creating miniature paintings on matchboxes, pumpkin seeds, sunflower seeds, and grains of rice. Later that year, he began sculpting miniature figures out of pencil graphite. The process is challenging due to the fragile nature of graphite and it is common for the miniature sculptures to fracture after spending many hours on a single piece.

Fidai spends between six and twelve hours on average to produce a statuette, while complicated models take between two and three days to create. He uses a craft knife and a stereo microscope for creating the tiny sculptures. At first, he used jumbo pencils with a graphite diameter of 5mm. He now primarily uses lead between 0.5 and 2mm in diameter. His microsculptures have featured characters from movies and cartoons, animals, objects from popular culture, comic book characters, famous works of art, household items, and architectural icons.

Salavat Fidai's microsculptures have been exhibited in London, Singapore, Los Angeles, Sharjah, and Saint Petersburg. Viewers are often provided with magnifying glasses to view the tiny sculptures. Boing Boing calls his work "an impressive achievement." Deutsche Welle notes that he has a worldwide fan base on social media.

== Exhibits ==
- Photo exhibition STOLICHNAYA HISTORY, The Central House of Culture, Moscow, Russia, September 2005
- "Eros, Times and Faces", Manege Central Exhibition Hall, St. Petersburg, Russia, September 2007
- Exhibition of young artists "MUSEUM SHOULD WORK", Creative cluster "ARTMUZA", St. Petersburg, Russia, January 2015
- Personal exhibition of microsculptures in LAUNCH! Gallery, Culver City, California, USA, June 2016
- Personal mini-exhibition of microsculptures in the framework of advertising by Virgin Trains, King's Cross, London, UK, September 2016
- Personal exhibition of microsculptures and "face" of the advertising company Sharjah International Book Fair, Expo centre Sharjah, UAE, November 2016
- The exhibition Records and Incredible Facts "Titicaca" in Gostiny Dvory, Arkhangelsk, Russia, February 2017
- "Game of Thrones: A Pencil Microsculpture Exhibition" in cooperation with HBO Asia. K+ Curatorial Space, Scotts Square, Singapore, May 2017

== Sampling of works ==
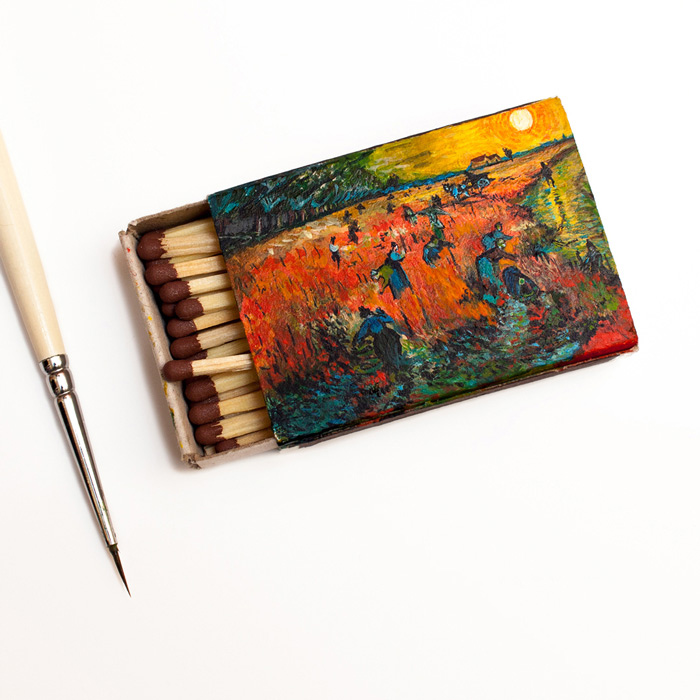
The Red Vineyards near Arles by Vincent Van Gogh painted on a matchbox

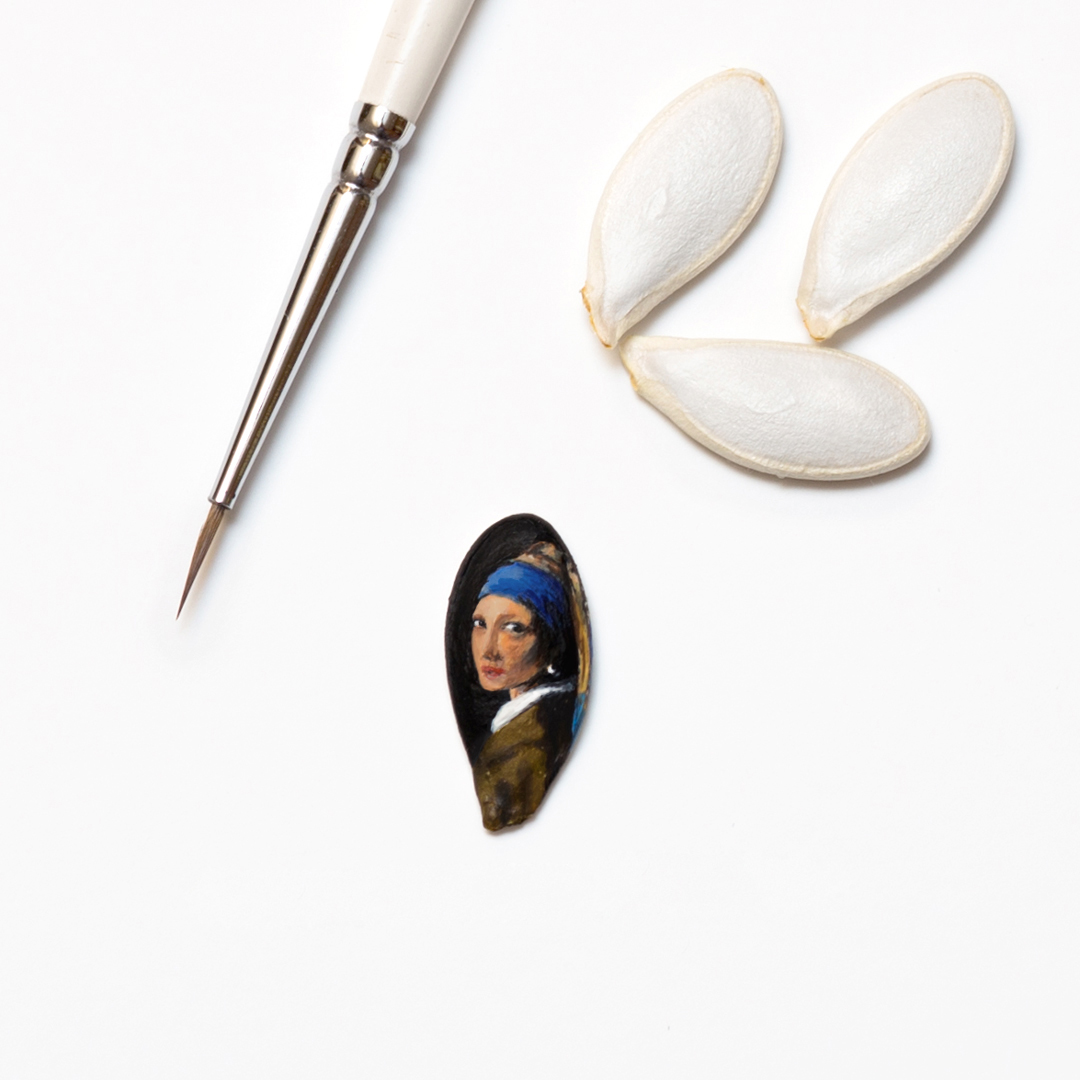
Girl with a Pearl Earring by Johannes Vermeer painted on a pumpkin seed

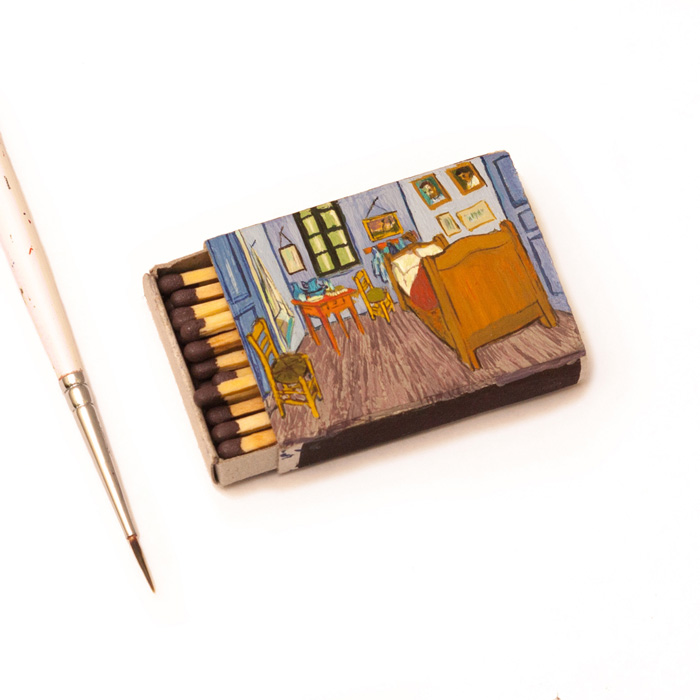
Bedroom in Arles by Van Gogh painted on a matchbox

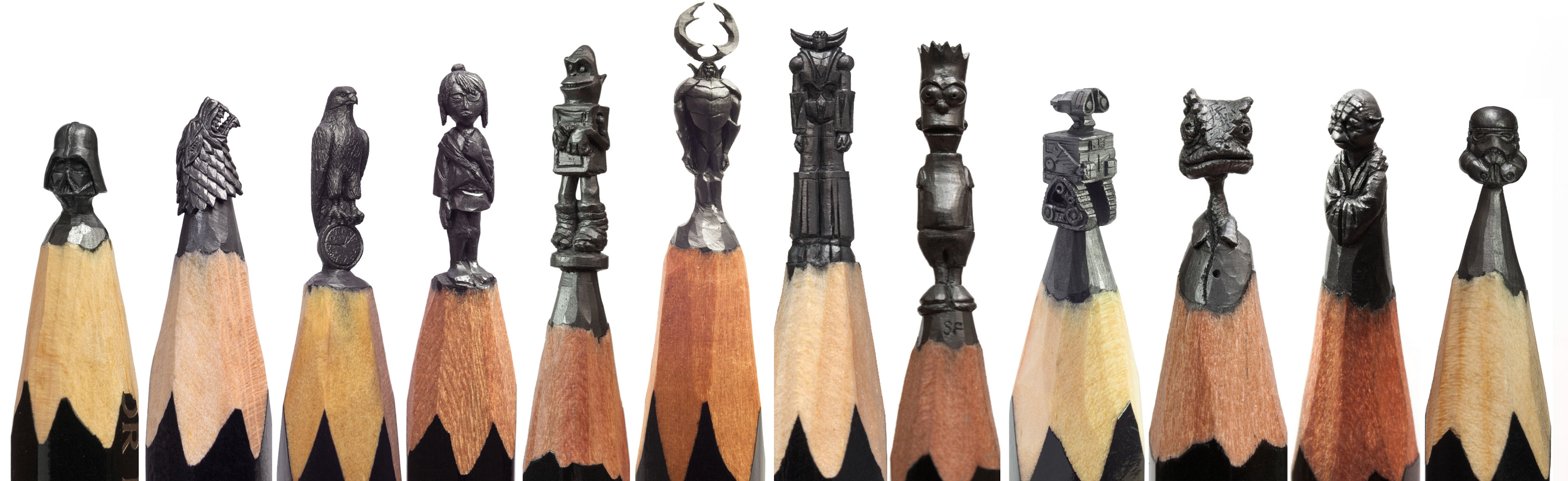
Characters sculpted from pencil graphite

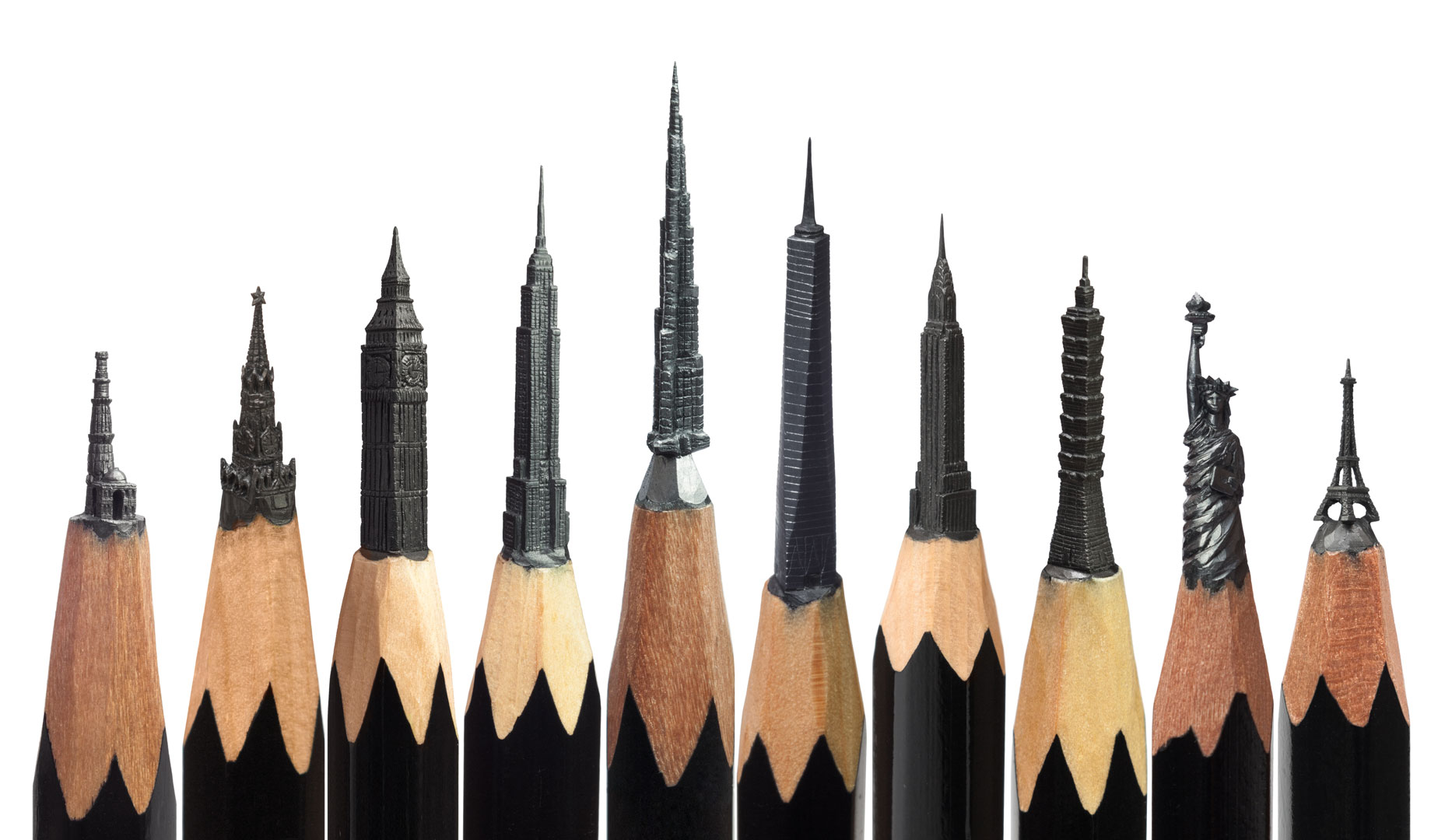
Landmarks sculpted from pencil graphite

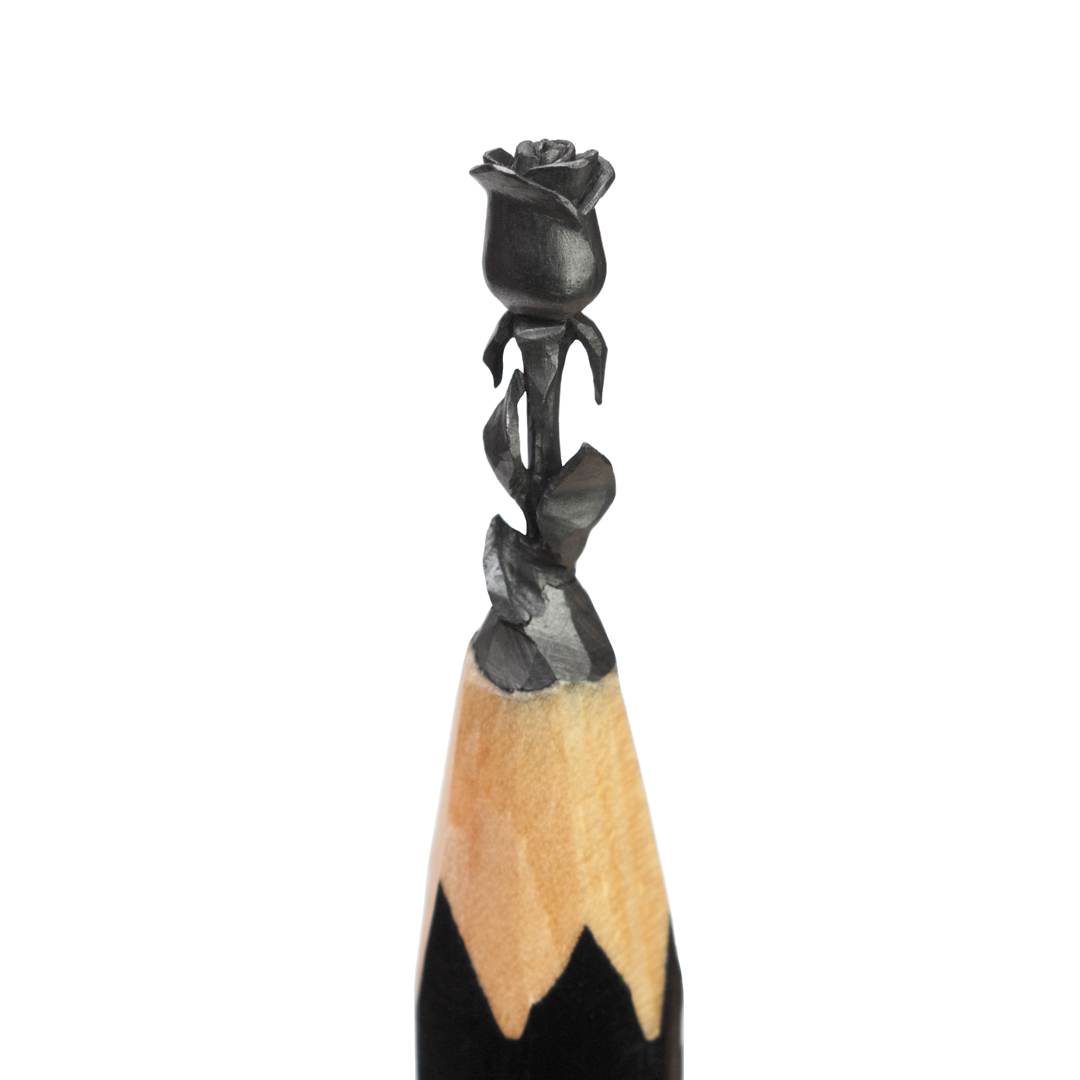
Graphite sculpture of a rose

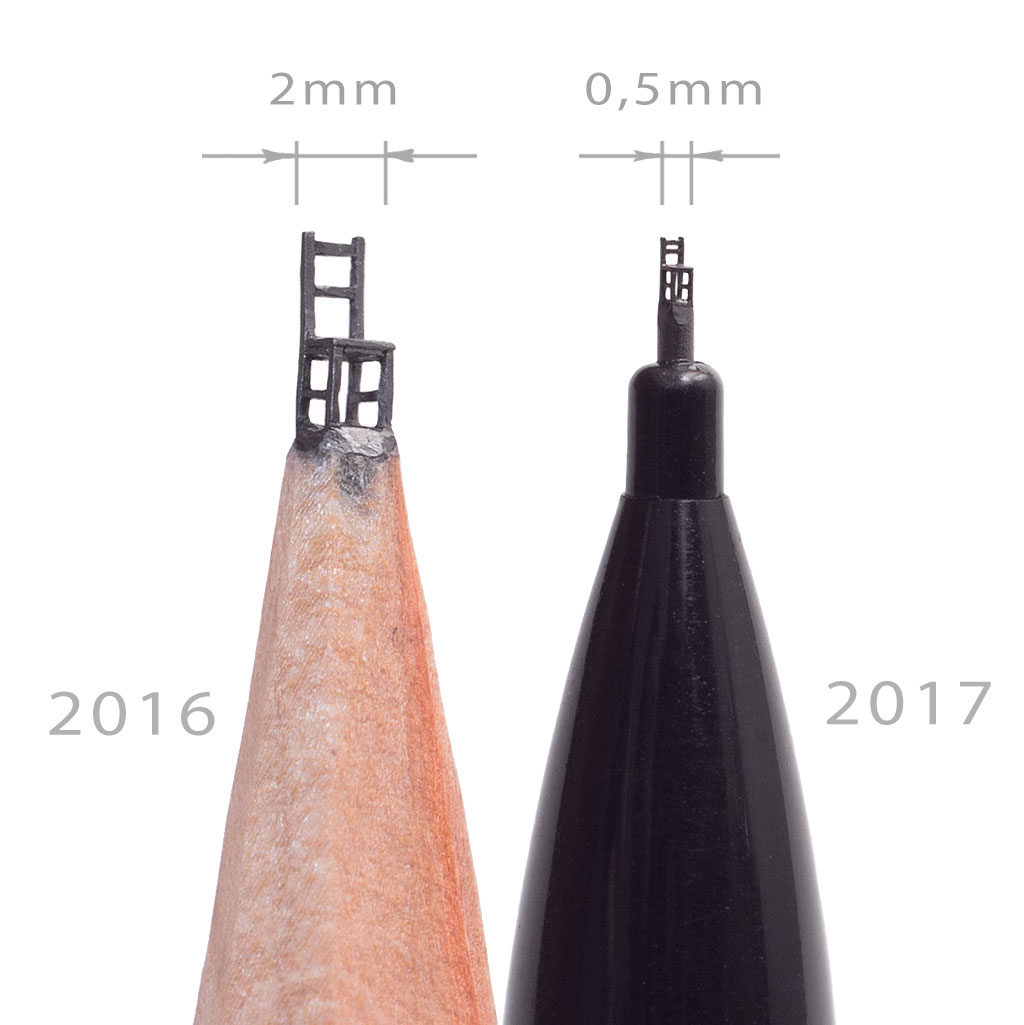
Graphite sculptures of a chair with 2mm and 0.5mm lead

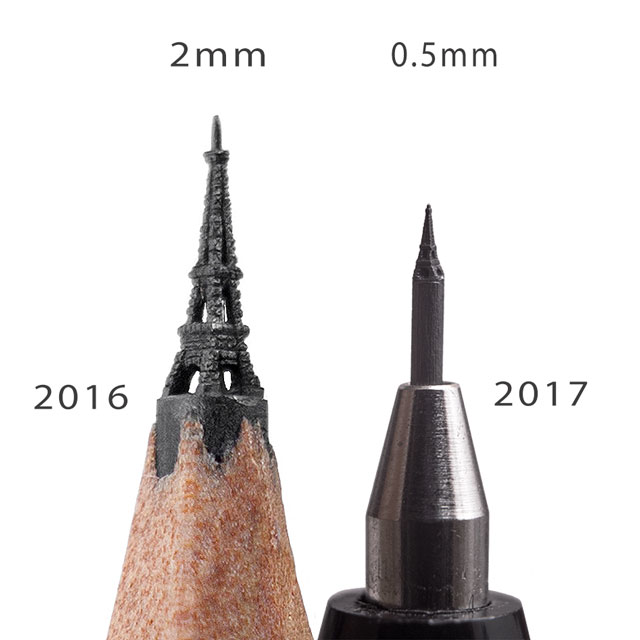
Graphite sculptures of the Eiffel tower with 2mm and 0.5mm lead

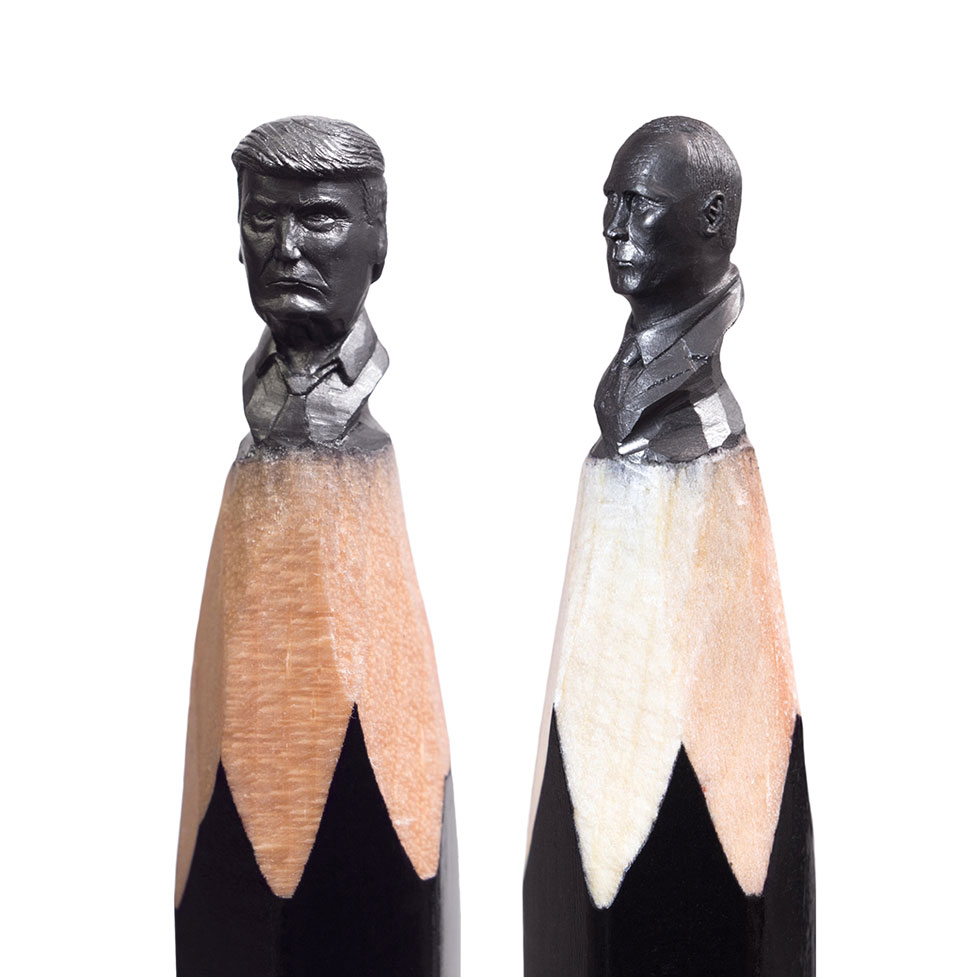
Graphite busts of Presidents Trump and Putin

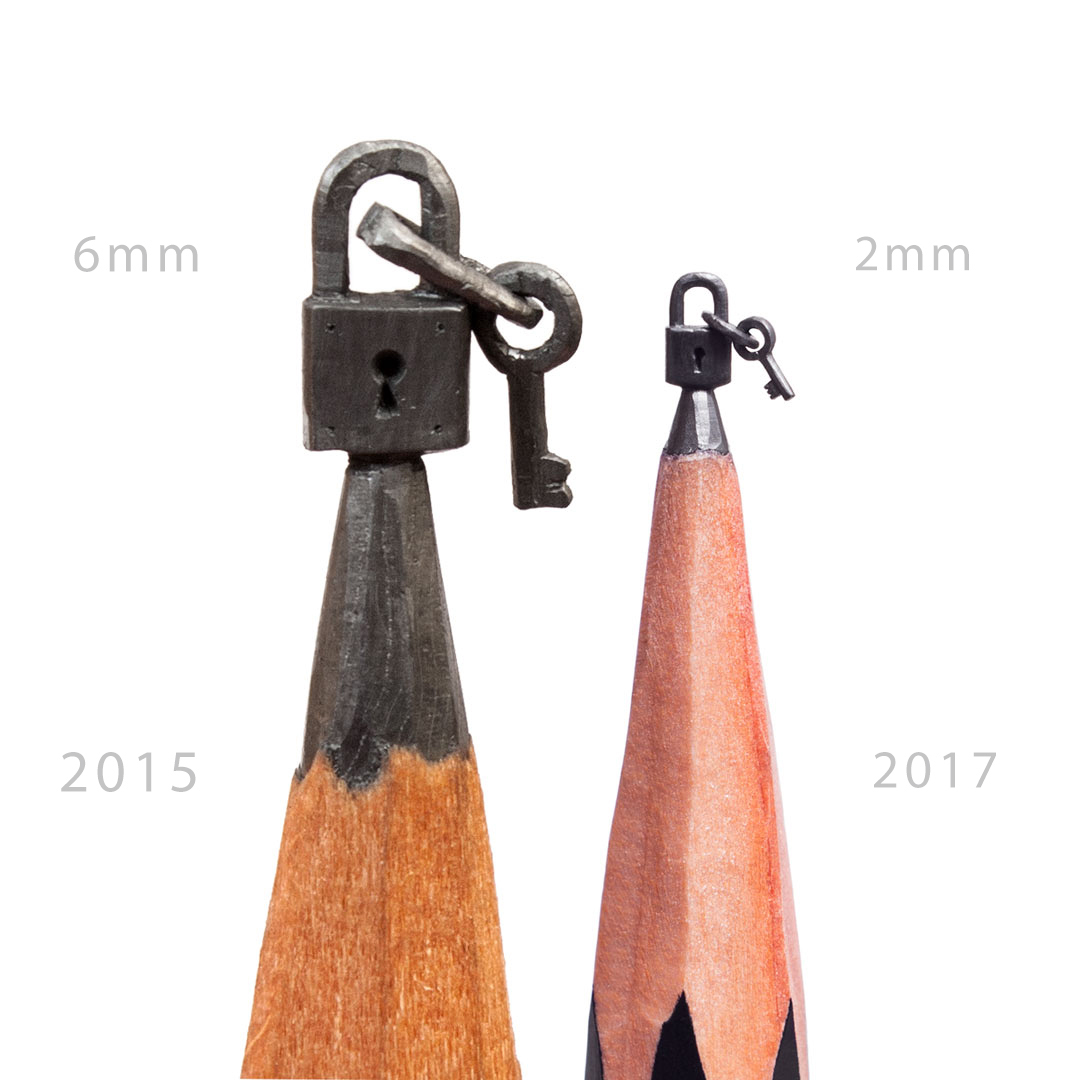
Graphite sculptures of a lock and key with 2mm and 0.5mm lead
