= Online art gallery =

An online art gallery is an online version of a contemporary art gallery.

== Purpose and type ==
An online art gallery is a website that display artworks. Usually, the online gallery is run as a business, with the purpose of displaying the artwork being to promote it to potential buyers. Other variations include:

- An online art market for collectors also known as an online secondary market.
- A contemporary art gallery displaying art work from their current, future, or past exhibitions, most often to promote the exhibitions, rather than with a view to selling the work via the website .
- An artist hosting their own gallery, either on their own website or on other websites. This approach is usually adopted with a view to increasing the percentage of the sale price the artist themselves receive.
- There are a number of online galleries that represent many artists working in different media and genre. The artist either pays a monthly fee or agrees to a commission paid when the work is sold. These are usually non-exclusive and are therefore a risk free opportunity for the artist to sell their work worldwide. They can be found by using search terms such as "original art" or "online art gallery".

== Viewing art online ==
Viewing art online is an improving experience. Ideally, art should appear as it would in the real world, though factors like lighting, viewing angles, and three-dimensional depth present challenges.

With the growth of broadband and improved web programming, digital art display has advanced significantly. To address these visualization limits and reassure collectors, leading online art galleries have adopted a multi-layered approach that often surpasses traditional visits. This includes comprehensive photography from multiple angles, close-ups of textures and brushwork, transparent pricing, and detailed documentation. Viewers can also use zoom tools to examine pigmentation, gauge scale against an average human height, or use "view on my wall" augmented reality features via mobile apps.

Beyond these visual tools, online galleries broaden the collector base by reducing the intimidation often felt in commercial art spaces. Accessing diverse works from home allows buyers to explore comfortably and develop their personal tastes without pressure.

== Associated facilities ==
Online galleries often form part of a wider online operation, with other popular facilities including:

- blogs
- news
- reviews
- events listings
- pricing information
- gallery listings
- forums
- desired framing
- collaboration
- remote accessibility

== Organizations ==
- Bluethumb Art Gallery
- Saatchi Art
- UGallery
- The Artchive
- Artmajeur

== See also ==
- Art exhibition
- Artist-run initiative
- Artist-run space
- Arts centre
- Contemporary art gallery
- List of notable museums and galleries
- List of national galleries
- Vanity gallery
