= Ben Heine =

Belgian artist

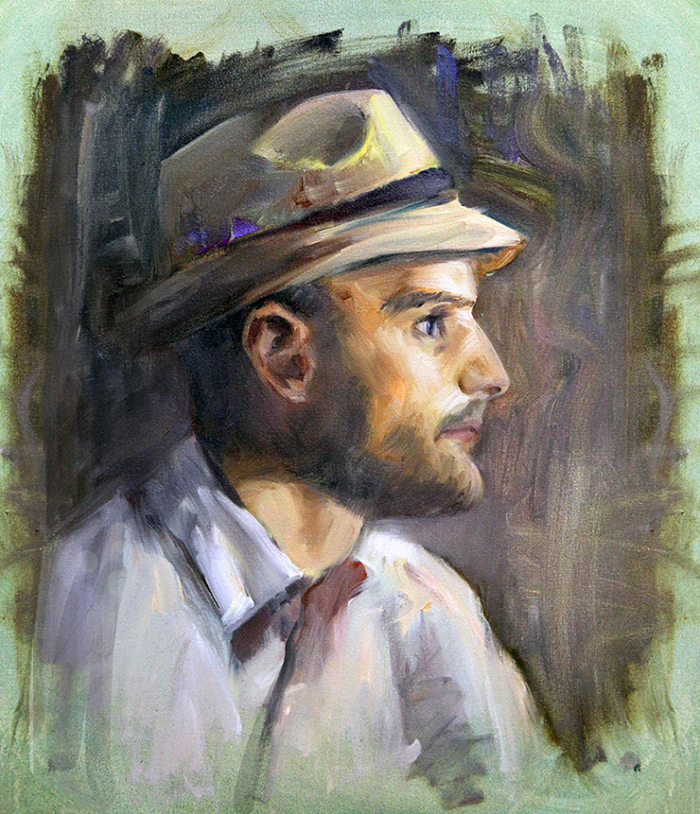
- Oil Portrait of Ben Heine
- Born: Benjamin Heine; 12 June 1983 (age 43); Abidjan, Ivory Coast
- Known for: Drawing, photography, music production
- Movement: Surrealism, Pop Art and House Music

Ben Heine is a Belgian multidisciplinary visual artist and music producer. In 2010 media described his "Pencil Vs Camera" art. He is an accomplished illustrator and photographer, He is also the creator of other original art series such as "Digital Circlism" and "Flesh and Acrylic".

He was born in 1983 in Ivory Coast and currently lives and works in Belgium. Ben has a degree in Journalism and is a self-taught person in drawing, photography and music. His creations have been featured in newspapers, magazines and major publications worldwide and since 2010 his works have begun to populate art galleries and museums in Europe, Asia and Russia. Heine permanently stopped doing political art in 2009. A documentary about his work was released in 2012.

Heine started producing and composing music in 2012 and plays drums and the piano. He owns a music studio since 2013. His first music album "Sound Spiral" was released in November 2015.

== Early life and education ==
Ben was born in 1983 in Abidjan, Ivory Coast. where he spent the first seven years of his life, with his parents and three sisters. His family relocated in Brussels, Belgium, in 1990. His father was a commercial engineer and his mother a choreographer and a dance teacher. Heine started drawing at 11 years of age. At that time, his curiosity for visual art was his keenest interest.

Between 1988 and 2006, Heine undertook studies in different countries, including Ivory Coast, Belgium, the UK and the Netherlands. He attended primary school at Notre Dame de La Trinité in Brussels. As a student, Heine easily became frustrated and bored, often becoming difficult to manage in school. It wasn't until he attended secondary education at "Collège Saint Vincent" in Belgium that he evolved into a more disciplined student. As a teenager, he explored drawing, painting and writing poetry to music and athletics.

In 2007, Ben earned a degree in Journalism, started at Université Libre de Bruxelles and completed at IHECS and Utrecht University of Applied Sciences. Ben also conducted studies in Art History, Sculpture, and Painting at Hastings College of Arts and Technology and at the Académie Royale des Beaux Arts de Bruxelles. Throughout his academic training, he learned music instruments including drums, djembe and piano. His studies and love for communication lead him to learn six different languages, French, English, Dutch, Polish, Spanish and Russian.

Between 2007 until the end of 2009, Heine worked in different fields to make a living, as a copywriter in a communication agency in Belgium and later as a language teacher and coach in different schools around Brussels. He also worked as a cashier in a supermarket. Despite these jobs, Ben's priority always remained in his creative projects and he was drawing and painting every night.

2010 was an important year for Heine, when he started working on the artworks of his major series, Pencil Vs Camera and Digital Circlism. From 2010 until today, Heine exhibited his artworks in major art fairs, museums and art galleries around the world. Since 2011, he also continued to develop his musical style.

== Art ==
=== Pencil VS camera ===
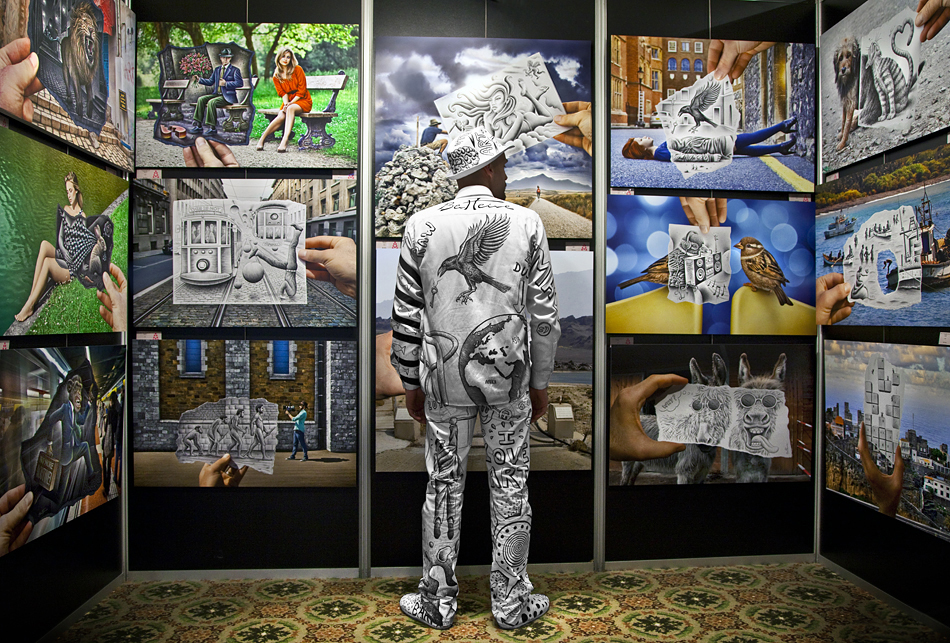
Ben Heine at Brussels Accessible Art Fair

The artworks in this series usually show a hand-drawn 2D sketch held and photographed by the artist in a specific location. They combine photography and drawing to infuse ordinary scenes with new surreal, visionary, or romanticized narratives. The inclusion of hand-held penciled sketches over a portion of the original photos allows Heine to enhance reality and open doors to an imaginary world. Heine brought some innovations to the concept in 2012 adding colors and black paper. Between 2010 and 2016, Heine's creations have been seen by the people through the exhibitions and news articles in major media outlets. Heine's first Pencil Vs Camera's images quickly gained popularity online and received positive criticisms from specialized and influential art sites along with news reports and international opportunities for the artist.

Some of primary and secondary public schools that are teaching Heine's Pencil Vs Camera concept are "International School of Beijing", "ColegioMenor in Quito", "Dover College", "Ecole Lamartine", "Ecole de Scorbé-Clairvaux", "Ecole Renaudeau", "Collège La Bruyère Sainte Isabelle" and others. Since 2012, many other creators and artists have borrowed from Heine's innovations to create various forms of similar 3D artworks.

=== Flesh and Acrylic ===
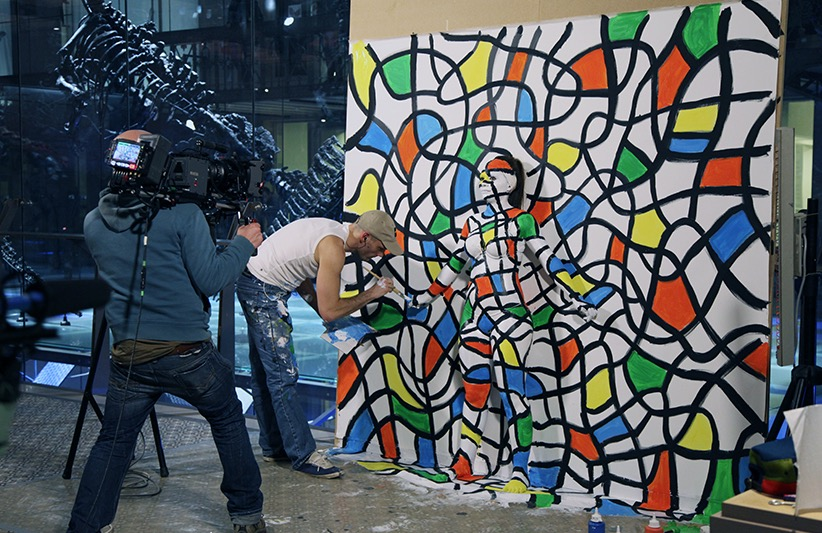
Flesh and Acrylic live performance at Brussels Natural Science Museum

This series started in 2011, Heine creates abstract acrylic paintings on large wooden panels. In the finished work it is at first difficult to tell where the human figure ends and the background "canvas" begins, both blending together into one surreal abstract vision. He takes pictures of the final composition so that they can be printed and exhibited later on. Heine made his first "Flesh and Acrylic" project with model Caroline Madison in 2011 for a documentary filmed by Italian director Davide Gentile. Between 2012 and 2015, Heine made several Flesh and Acrylic live performances.

=== Digital circlism ===
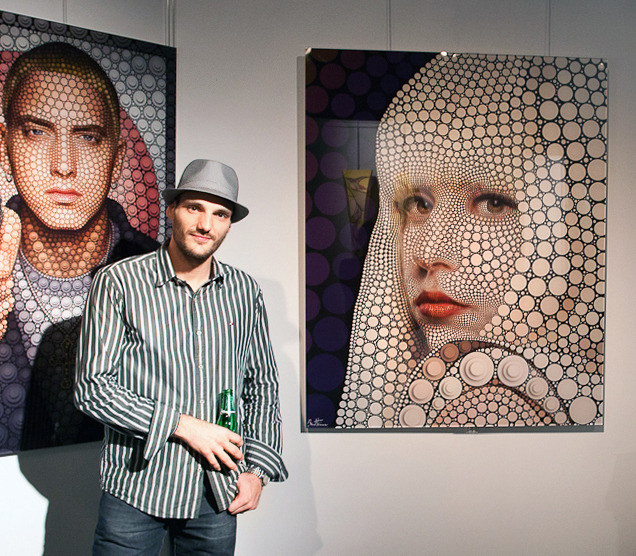
Ben Heine during an exhibition of Digital circlism

This is the name Heine has given to a whole new creative technique he has developed in 2010. It is a mix between Pop Art and Pointillism. In this project, Heine usually makes portraits of celebrities/cultural icons with digital tools using flat circles on a black background. Each circle has a single color and a single tone. Trends Hunter said about Digital Circlism: "Through the use of graphic software and a whole lot of creativity, Ben Heine is able to create iconic faces from history and pop culture by drawing circles of various sizes and colors. In order to give them a dynamic and 3-dimensional appearance". The artist stated he has been making portraits for over 15 years but it wasn't very long ago that he started developing this original technique. "As I've been working with digital tools recently, this came quite naturally, and I'm a big fan of Pop Art and Pointillism. Digital Circlism is a modern mix of them".

=== Influences ===
Heine says he is influenced by Belgian Surrealism, German Expressionism, American Pop Art, and Social Realism. Abduzeezo says about Heine: "His galleries are filled with great stuff and he can walk beautifully between several art directions, creating amazing pieces in any way he goes".

=== Political works ===
Traditionally trained in journalism and communications at IHECS Journalism School, Heine tried his hand at political cartoons because he wanted to connect his interest in art with his studies in Journalism. This brief encounter was far less charitable to him than he had hoped. His political activism, at the cusp of his youth, unleashed a string of criticism and threats. In the end, Heine felt it was perhaps wiser to walk away from political cartoons in 2009.

At IHECS, international politics professor Paul Delmotte gave Heine pro-Palestinian information throughout his studies. In 2006, at the end of his scholarship and just after the Muhammad cartoon contest controversy, Heine made a master's final assignment, which included a detailed investigation about the "Limits of Freedom of Expression in Political Cartooning". At that time, Heine was also member of many cartoonists and activists associations. These organizations and particularly "Iran Cartoon" requested that he participates in a competition calling for provocative Holocaust-related images sponsored by the Iranian newspaper Hamshahri as an answer to the Muhammad cartoon contest.

Heine's participation in this contest lead to controversy. Due to the pro-Palestinian nature of several of his older political art, he received some criticisms for his views on the Middle Eastern political situation and specifically for some images about Israel and Zionism. Because of this, Heine decided to completely stop creating political cartoons in 2009 and to focus on his own art. He also asked all websites that published his political images to permanently remove them because he said these drawings lacked nuance and intelligence and they kept generating confusion about his evolution as a non-political artist. He also said he made such mistakes because he was too young and didn't have objective information.

Heine wrote an open letter in 2010 to beg pardon to the Jewish Community, to express his regrets and apologize for the mess and pain this event had generated. He made clear he was against revisionism, anti-Semitism and xenophobia. He also explained the academic context in which he was, how cartoon organizations had manipulated his drawings, how he lost control of the situation and how much this issue had caused him troubles. Since 2009, Heine has firmly distanced himself from all activists' organizations.

== Music ==
Heine started creating electronic music, writing songs, singing and composing in 2011. He bought a professional creative studio in Belgium since 2012. In 2013, Heine's music track "Fly With You" was added in the collective album "Mesh 1.0" released by DMS in the UK. From 2013 to 2014, he worked on improving his knowledge in music theory and piano practice. In 2014, Heine started to collaborate with other musicians and singers including pianist Thibault Crols and Saxophonist Stéphane Pigeon.

In 2015, Heine music was played publicly for the first time at Moscow Planetarium, at the National Museum of Arkhangelsk and in 2016 at Tyumen Fine Art Museum in the frame of his itinerant solo exhibition in Russia. Ben Heine's first album "Sound Spiral" was released in 2015. In March 2016, his music tracks "Warsaw", "I'm a Clown", "Amour" and "It's Just a Play" were selected by "Wix Music" and played at the SXSW music festival.

== Past exhibitions ==
- 2016 "Art and Music of Ben Heine", ArtMuza Modern Art Museum, Saint Petersburg, Russia
- 2016 "Art and Music of Ben Heine", State History Museum, Omsk, Russia
- 2016 "Ben Heine Art and Music ", Fine Art Museum, Tyumen, Russia
- 2016 "Surréalisme à la Belge", Centre Culturel des Roches, Rochefort, Belgium
- 2015 "Ben Heine", National Museum, Arkhangelsk, Russia
- 2015 "The Art & Music of Ben Heine", Moscow Planetarium, Russia
- 2015 "From Cocoa to Choco", Harbour City, William Chan Design, Hong Kong
- 2015 "Heine Mazda Car Design", Affordable Art Fair, Brussels, Belgium
- 2015 "Festival Dont Vous Etes le Héros", Université de Namur, Belgium
- 2014 "Parallel Universe", DCA Gallery, Brussels, Belgium
- 2014 "On The Draw, an Illustrated Journey", Promotur, Temporary Art Café, Turin, Italy
- 2014 "Pencil Vs Camera", Accessible Art Fair, Cercle de Lorraine, Brussels, Belgium
- 2014 "Museum Night Fever", Natural Science Museum, Brussels, Belgium
- 2014 "An Illustrated Journey in Tenerife", Promotur, Canvas Studios, London, United Kingdom
- 2014 "On The Draw, an Illustrated Journey", Promotur, Mercado San Anton, Madrid, Spain
- 2013 "The Universe of Ben Heine", Hyehwa Art Center, Seoul, South Korea
- 2013 "Taste Buds & Pure Street", Culinaria, Tour et Taxis, Brussels, Belgium
- 2013 "Street Art Exhibition", Pavillon M, Tour de France Photo, Marseille, France
- 2013 "Saint Valentine Magic", Begramoff Gallery, Brussels, France
- 2013 "Wallonie Bienvenue", Ben Heine Studio, Rochefort, Belgium
- 2012 "The Best of Both Worlds", VIP Offices, Brussels, Belgium
- 2012 "Creative Sketching in Lisbon", Samsung Portugal, Lisbon, Portugal
- 2012 "Illusion and Poetry", The Art Movement, The Avenue, Brussels, Belgium
- 2012 "Imagination Vs Reality", Accessible Art Fair, Conrad Hotel, Brussels, Belgium
- 2012 "Drawings and Photos", The Art Movement, London Art Fair, London, United Kingdom
- 2012 "Pencil Vs Camera, Flesh and Acrylic", Art Event, Namur Expo, Namur, Belgium
- 2011 "Another World", Radeski Art Gallery, Liège, Belgium
- 2011 "Space and Time", Gallery Garden, The Artistery, Brussels, Belgium
- 2011 "Flesh and Acrylic", Accessible Art Fair, Conrad Hotel, Brussels, Belgium
