= Nikolai Blokhin =

Russian artist

- Николай Блохин
- Born: 22 May 1968; Saint Petersburg, Russia
- Education: Saint Petersburg Repin Academy of Fine Arts
- Style: portrait painting
- Awards: Grand Prize from the American Society of Portrait Artists (2002); Award at the Portrait Society of America's (2004)

Nikolai Blokhin (born 22 May 1968) is a Russian artist, portrait painter, painter of the Russian Academic School, member of the Union of Artists of the Russian Federation, Member of the Portrait Society of America.

== Biography ==
Nikolai Blokhin was born in St. Petersburg, Russia in 1968.

In his childhood, Nikolai Blokhin was more passionate about sports than art. His father believed that boys should become engineers, while his mother insisted that her sons pursue the arts. At school, Nikolai showed a talent for drawing. Even though Blokhin deliberately tried to draw poorly during his art school entrance exam to avoid admission, the trick failed, and he was accepted. This marked the beginning of the artist's grand creative journey.

Nikolai Blokhin's formal education in art began in 1980 at the Art School for Gifted Children. He later graduated from St. Petersburg Academy of Arts, where he also completed his postgraduate practical training.

Blokhin achieved his first major professional success in portrait painting—a genre defined by its strict dependence on the model and limited room for experiment.

In his works, the artist celebrates the stereotyped Russian character: extraordinarily strong, slightly wild, vibrant, and alive.

He is a recipient of international awards, notably the 2002 Grand Prize from the American Society of Portrait Artists at the Metropolitan Museum of Art, New York.

In 2004, he won the award at the Portrait Society of America's (PSA) International Competition.

In 2010, Blokhin held an exhibition in the State Halls of the Research Museum of the Russian Academy of Arts. His previous exhibitions were held in Moscow and St. Petersburg between 2006 and 2008. The artist's works are kept in the State Museum of Fine Arts of the Republic of Tatarstan in Kazan, the Polytechnic Museum in Moscow, the collection of the Moscow Parliament Center, and various private collections.

A particularly milestone event in Nikolai Blokhin's exhibition career was his solo exhibition at the home and studio of the great Russian master Nikolai Fechin (2008, Taos Art Museum & Fechin House) in the small town of Taos, New Mexico, USA.

In 2019, at the Figurative Art Convention & Expo (FACE), Nikolai Blokhin conducted a live portrait painting demonstration on the event's main stage. During the masterclass, the artist demonstrated his signature technique, characterized by dynamic brushwork, the use of large brushes, and precise detailing.
