= Accessible Art Fair =

Belgian contemporary art fair

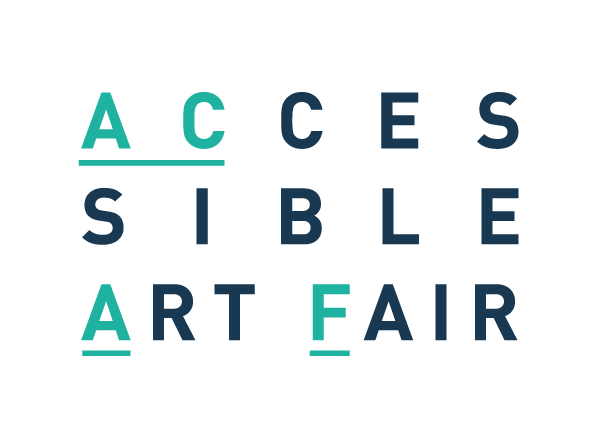
Accessible Art Fair logo

The Accessible Art Fair (ACAF) is a contemporary art fair originally launched in Belgium in 2007. The fair takes place annually and lasts four days, presenting more than 50 artists including local and international painters, photographers, sculptors, and designers. The artists are carefully selected from a jury of professionals in the field.

== History ==
The Accessible Art Fair was founded by Stephanie Manasseh with the mission to “give a platform to talented emerging and established artists to sell their work to an art buying public”. The first edition of Accessible Art Fair took place in 2007, hosting nine artists at the European Training Institute.

Following the success of the 2008 and 2009 editions at the Silken Hotel, which drew nearly 4,000 visitors combined, the fair moved to the Steigenberger Grandhotel (formerly Conrad Brussels Hotel), where it has been held since 2010.

In 2012 the event welcomed over 6,000 visitors. In 2014, the Accessible Art Fair took place at the Cercle de Lorraine, and in 2017 and 2018 it took place at the Centre for Fine Arts, Brussels.
