= UGallery =

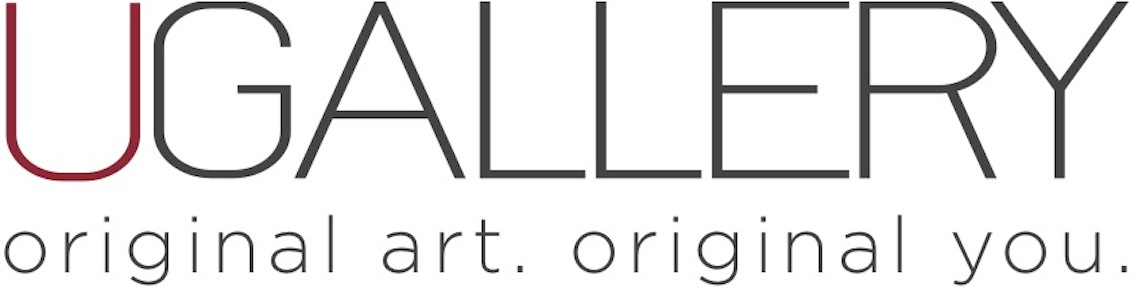
- Type: Private company
- Industry: E-Commerce; Art Gallery
- Founded: 2006
- Founder: Stephen Tanenbaum, Alex Farkas, Greg Rosborough
- Headquarters: San Francisco, CA
- Area served: Worldwide
- Products: Original Artwork
- Website: www.ugallery.com

UGallery is a curated online art gallery headquartered in San Francisco, CA. Founded in 2006, UGallery is an e-commerce platform that connects artists directly with collectors on its website. The company positions itself as an approachable and convenient alternative to the brick-and-mortar contemporary art gallery.

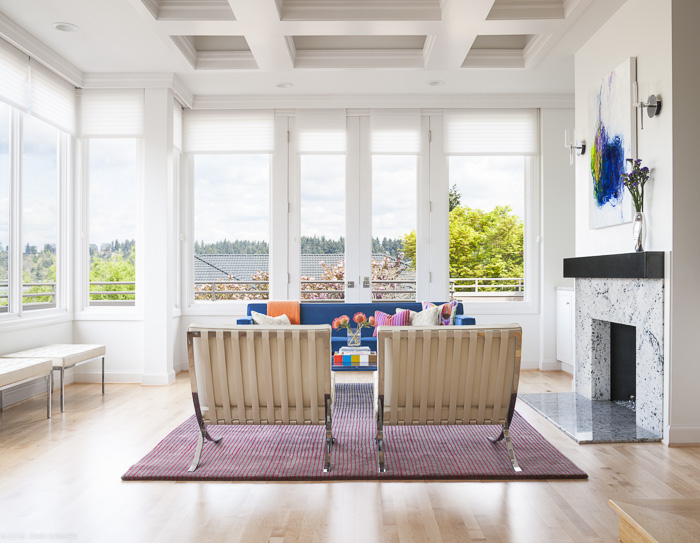
"It All Comes Together" by UGallery artist Elena Baker

== History ==
The company was founded by Alex Farkas, Stephen Tanenbaum and Greg Rosborough. The three met in a business class at the University of Arizona. Sharing an interest in the arts, they developed the concept for UGallery through the McGuire Entrepreneurship Program. The UGallery.com website launched in September 2006.

Originally seen as a way to help recent art school graduates find buyers, UGallery began with five artists and 25 pieces of original art. Securing outside capital in 2008, the company shifted its focus to mid-career and emerging artists from around the world.

=== Gallery ===
As of February 2014, UGallery exhibits the work of 500 professional artists and more than 6,500 pieces of original paintings, fine-art photography, drawings and sculptures. The company counts clients in every U.S. state and over 45 countries, as well as 1.7 million social followers.

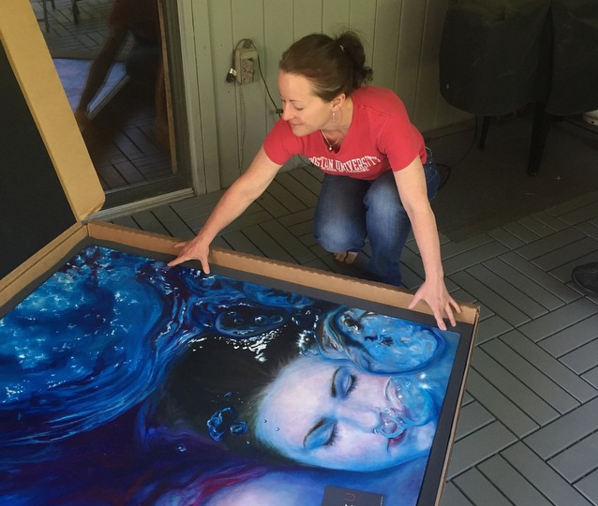
Artist Jennifer Hannaford packs her sold artwork in a UGallery delivery box.

== Reception ==
UGallery was an early entrant to the business of selling original art online. At the time, many art critics questioned the concept. A 2007 Wall Street Journal article called "the online art marketplace as mottled as a Monet water scene." By 2012, the online art market was valued at $870 million. In 2014, the estimated value of the online art market grew to $2.64 billion, accounting for 4.8% of the estimated $55.2 billion value of the global art market.

== Recognition ==
In 2011, The Economist called UGallery "unintimidating enough to encourage a new generation of collectors." In 2013, VentureBeat wrote that UGallery's e-commerce platform is "democratizing the art world." The same year, Internet Retailer named UGallery to their Second 500 Guide, and in 2015, named UGallery the top luxury e-retailer for artwork.
