= Ruslan Fazlyev =

Russian entrepreneur (born 1980)

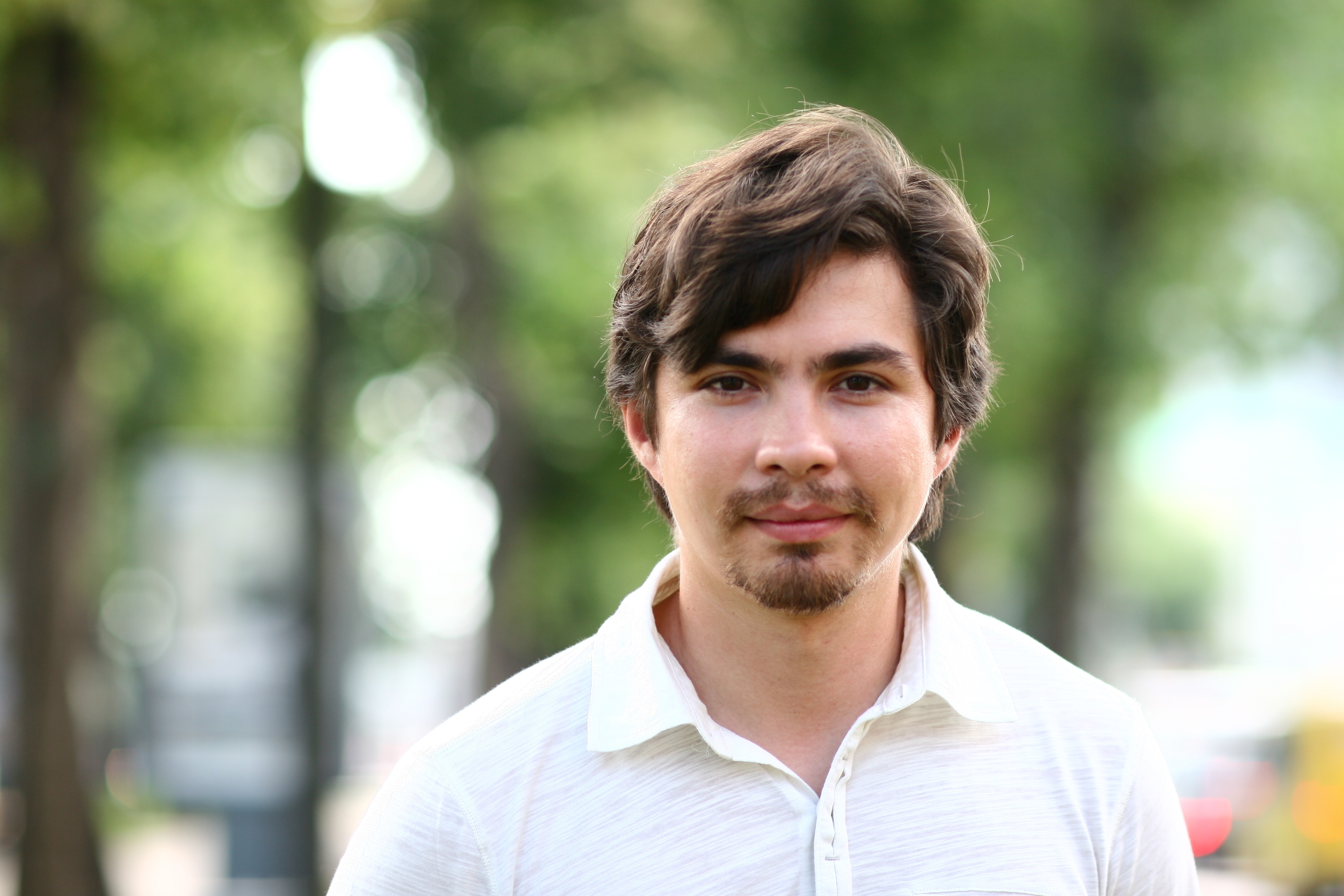
- Ruslan Fazlyev, July 2011
- Born: March 27, 1980 (age 46); Oktyabrsky, Republic of Bashkortostan, Soviet Union
- Occupation: Internet Entrepreneur
- Years active: 2001–present
- Known for: X-Cart; Ecwid

Ruslan Renatovich Fazlyev (Bashkir: Руслан Ренат улы Фазлыев, born March 27, 1980) is a Russian Internet entrepreneur who has founded several companies. He is best known as a founder and developer of Ecwid and X-Cart e-commerce platforms.

Ruslan is ranked number 14 in Hopes&Fears’s rating of young Russian entrepreneurs and number 56 among Russian internet millionaires according to Kommersant’s research.

== Early life ==
Fazlyev was born in Oktyabrsky, Republic of Bashkortostan. Ruslan has been programming since he was seven years old. At first, he used pen and paper. His first personal computer had no screen. Despite all the technical difficulties, Ruslan practised reverse engineering of software and created simple games. From 1997 to 1999, he studied at Ulyanovsk State Technical University. Ruslan dropped out of the school, but nowadays, he is regularly invited to lecture at USTU. He is married to a woman he met before starting his own business.

== Career ==
Ruslan claims that he became an entrepreneur only because he had no job in Ulyanovsk. His first e-commerce software, named X-Cart, was released in 2001. Fazlyev and his friends utilised the code developed for commercial websites to create the first e-commerce product written in PHP. X-Cart aimed small and medium businesses that could not afford far more expensive and complicated products such as IBM WebSphere Commerce.

Ecwid adopted the same approach in 2009. It is an e-commerce platform that can be built into any existing website or social network page. An award-winning product received a 1,5M round from the Runa Capital venture fund in December 2011 and a syndicated 5M round from Runa Capital and iTech Capital in May 2013. Ecwid has been the world's most popular social network trading software since 2012. Ruslan is CEO of Ecwid and Board Member of X-Cart.

Long before engaging in the software business, he created the first telecommunication company in Ulyanovsk. It was sold to a larger competitor in 2002.

From 2012 to 2014, Fazlyev was a member of the Expert Council for the Development of the Information Technology Industry of the Russian Ministry of Communications and Mass Media.
