= Yakup Kulmiy =

Russian writer (1918–1994)

Yakup Kulmiy (Yakup Khairullovich Kulmukhametov) Bashkir: Яҡуп Ҡолмой(Ҡолмөхәмәтов Яҡуп Хәйрулла улы)
- Born: 7 September 1918; Kanakaevo, Ishimbaysky District Bashkortostan, Russia
- Died: 11 October 1994 (aged 76); Kanakaevo, Ishimbaysky District Bashkortostan, Russia
- Occupation: poet

Yakup Kulmiy (Russian: Якуб Кулмый; Bashkir: Яҡуп Ҡолмой; 7 September 1918, village of Kanakbaevo, Bashkortostan – 11 October 1994, village of Kanakaevo) was a Bashkir poet working under the pen name of Yakup Khairullovich Kulmukhametov.

He is the author of more than 20 books of poems: "Selected works" (1968), "The beauty of soul" (1971), "The sun of soul" (1990), "Lyrics" (1993) and others; and popular songs: "My motherland", "My Urals", "A nightingale" and others.

Being a participant in the second world war, he was awarded the Order of the Patriotic War 2nd class, and medals. In 1958-1978, he worked in radio, in the wording of literary programs of the State Committee for Television and Radio Broadcasting Council of Ministers of the Bashkir Autonomous Republic.

== Memory ==
- In May 2013 in Kanakaevo was opened Park and a monument to (bust) dedicated to the memory of the poet.
