= Salavat Yulaev =

Salavat Yulaev may refer to:

- Salawat Yulayev, Bashkir national hero
  - Salavat Yulayev (film), a 1941 Soviet film directed by Yakov Protazanov
    - Salavat Yulayev Cave, a cave where the shooting occurred for the film
  - Salawat Yulayev (opera), opera in three acts by the Bashkir composer Zagir Ismagilov
  - Salavat Yulaev Ufa, Russian professional ice hockey team based in Ufa
  - Salawat Yulayev Award, state award of the Republic of Bashkortostan .
