= Usen-Ivanovskoye =

Usen-Ivanovskoye Усень-Ивановское
- Selo
- Location within Bashkortostan Location within Russia
- Coordinates: 54°11′N 54°20′E
- Country: Russia
- Region: Bashkortostan
- District: Belebeyevsky District

Population (2010)
  - Total: 882
- Time zone: UTC+5:00
- Postal code: 452033

Usen-Ivanovskoye (Russian: Усень-Ивановское, Bashkir: Өҫән-Ивановка, Öśän-İvanovka) is a rural locality (a selo) and the administrative centre of Usen-Ivanovsky Selsoviet, Belebeyevsky District, Bashkortostan, Russia. The population was 882 as of 2010. There are 6 streets.

== Geography ==
Usen-Ivanovskoye is located 21 km northeast of Belebey (the district's administrative centre) by road. Sosnovy Bor is the nearest rural locality.

== History ==
Usen-Ivanovskoye was first founded in 1741 by a group of Old Believers, most of whom were from Gorodets of the Nizhny Novgorod Oblast. There was a settlement nearby called Irysly, originally inhabited by the Bshkir tribe of Min, but they later moved to the village of Kidrach.

On the day of Nativity of John the Baptist in 1761, a Ural industrialist named Ivan Petrovich Osokin built a copper smelter on the river Usen, and named the settlement around it "Usen-Ivanovsky Zavod". The plant opened on November 29, 1761, and a pond was built next to it to ensure its operation. This pond still exist, and retains the title of "Barsky Pond".

The copper plant was closed in 1864, by that time it had been smelting 201,000 pounds of copper cumulatively. Five years later, the Usen-Ivanoskoye Forestry was opened on the basis of Ivan Osokin's forest dacha. In 1870, a pine alley was laid in honor of the 100th anniversary of the birth of Alexander Pushkin. At the time Usen-Ivanoskoye had 276 households, 1,813 inhabitants, 4 water mills, and a chapel for schismatics in the village.

In 1833, Vladimir Dal visited Usen-Ivanoskoye, and the beauty of its forest was described in Dal's book "The Bashkir Mermaid". In the 1880s, writer Filipp Nefyodov also visited here, and the nature of the village was described in his essay "Disturbed Plant"

In 1904, Corresponding Member of the USSR Academy of Sciences Dmitry Konstantinovich Zelenin lived in Usen-Ivanovsky. He, in the article “A Month in the Life of an Ethnographer”, was the first to describe “Features of the Life of the Usen-Ivanovsky Old Believers”, dedicated to the ethnography of Russians in Bashkiria.
