= Salavat =

Salavat may refer to:

== Places ==
- Salavat, Afghanistan, an inhabited locality in Afghanistan
- Salavat, Iran, a village in Ardabil Province, Iran
- Salavat Rural District, in Ardabil Province, Iran
- Salavat Urban Okrug, a municipal formation into which the city of republic significance of Salavat in the Republic of Bashkortostan, Russia is incorporated
- Salavat, Russia, a city in the Republic of Bashkortostan, Russia

== Others ==
- Salawat, meaning "peace be upon him", a phrase often used after the name of a prophet of Islam
- 5546 Salavat, an asteroid discovered in 1979

== See also ==
- Salawat (disambiguation)
- Salavat Yulaev (disambiguation)
