= Ziganovka =

Ziganovka Зигановка
- Village
- Location within Bashkortostan Location within Russia
- Coordinates: 53°37′N 56°34′E
- Country: Russia
- Region: Bashkortostan
- District: Ishimbaysky District
- Time zone: UTC+5:00

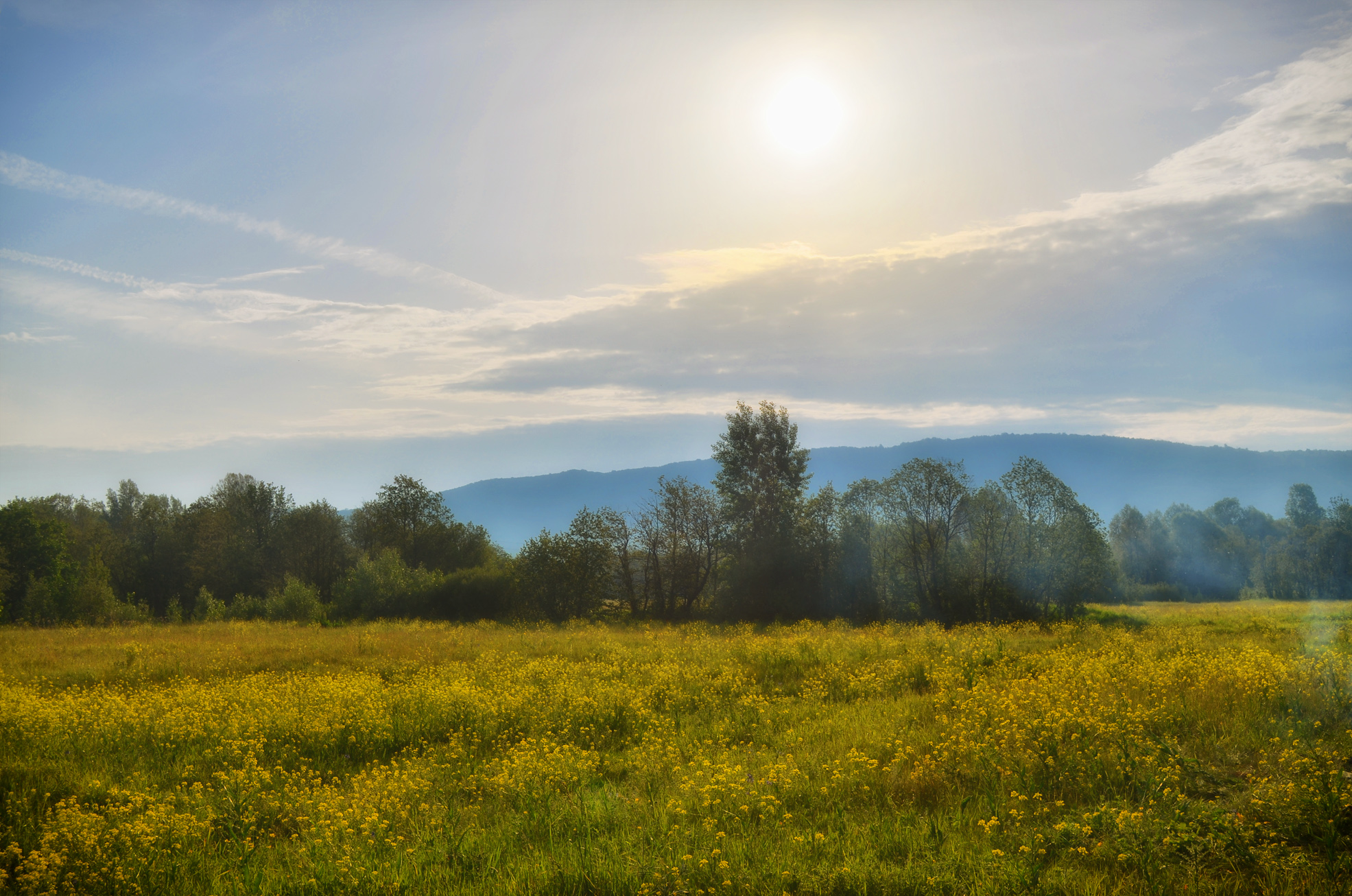
A meadow near Ziganovka

Ziganovka (Russian: Зигановка; Bashkir: Егән, Yegän) is a rural locality (a selo) in Makarovsky Selsoviet of Ishimbaysky District of the Republic of Bashkortostan, Russia, located near the Zigan River.
