= Olı Mäñgär =

Olı Mäñgär Олы Мәңгәр
- Selo
- Location within Tatarstan
- Country: Russia
- Region: Tatarstan
- District: Ätnä District
- Time zone: UTC+3:00

Olı Mäñgär (Tatar: Олы Мәңгәр, romanized: Olı Mäñgär, Russian: Большой Менгер) is a rural locality (a selo) in Ätnä District, Tatarstan. The population was 680 as of 2010.

== Geography ==
Olı Mäñgär is located 8 km east of Olı Ätnä, district's administrative centre, and 163 km northeast of Qazan, republic's capital, by road.

== History ==
The village existed already during the period of the Khanate of Qazan.

From 17th to first half of the 19th centuries the village's residents belonged to the social estate of state peasants.

The population of Olı Mäñgär reached its peak of about 1900 inhabitants in 1897. By the beginning of the twentieth century, village had 3 mosques, 2 mektebs, 7 inns, 2 windmills and 3 watermills, 3 smithy, 4 small shops and a bazaar on Tuesdays.

Before the creation of the Tatar ASSR in 1920 the village was a part of Qazan Uyezd of Qazan Governorate. Since 1920 the village was a part of Arça Canton; after the creation of districts in Tatar ASSR (Tatarstan) in Tuqay (later Ätnä) (1930–1959), Tuqay (former Qızıl Yul) (1959–1963), Arça (1963–1990) and Ätnä districts.

== Notable places ==
- Wäliulla Bäkeref's house.

== Notable people ==
Olı Mäñgär is the birthplace of two Tatar Soviet architects, Äxmät Bikçäntäyef and İsmäğil Ğäynetdinef, Ğäbdessäläm bine Uray a poet, Bari Abdullin, the 2nd secretary Tatarstan Regional Committee of the VKP(b), Saniä Zahirova, and a recipient of the award for the Hero of Socialist Labour, Nazlıgöl Latıypova, an Honored Artist of the Tatar ASSR.
