= Uyil =

Bashkir folk song

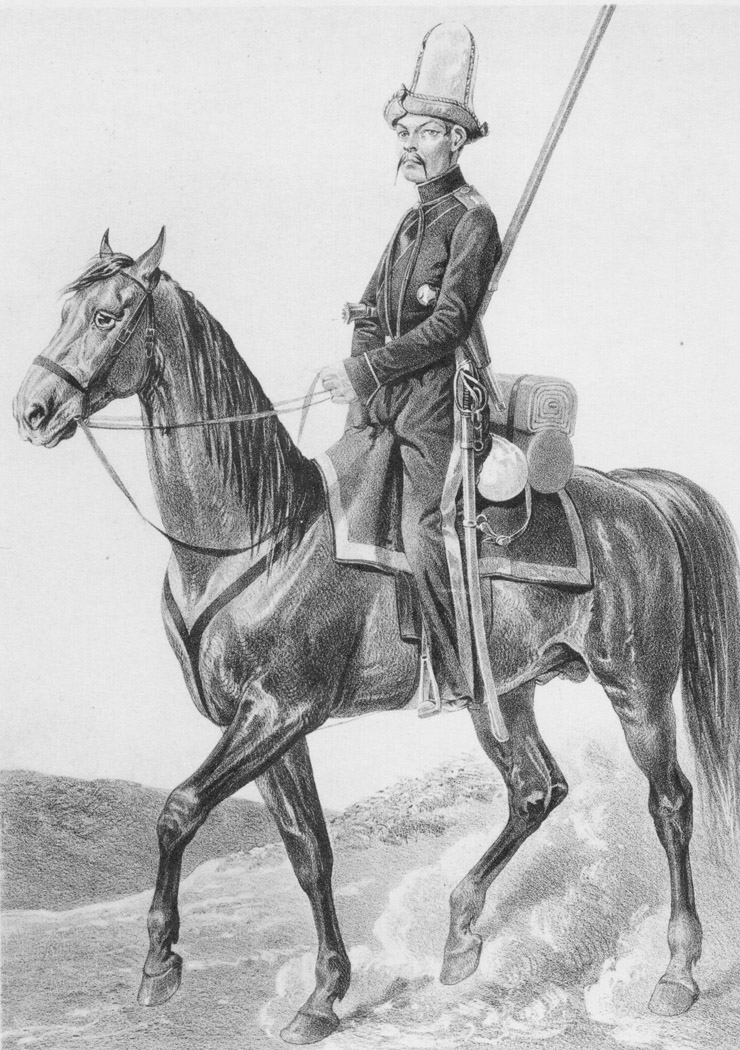
Bashkir Cossack. 19th century

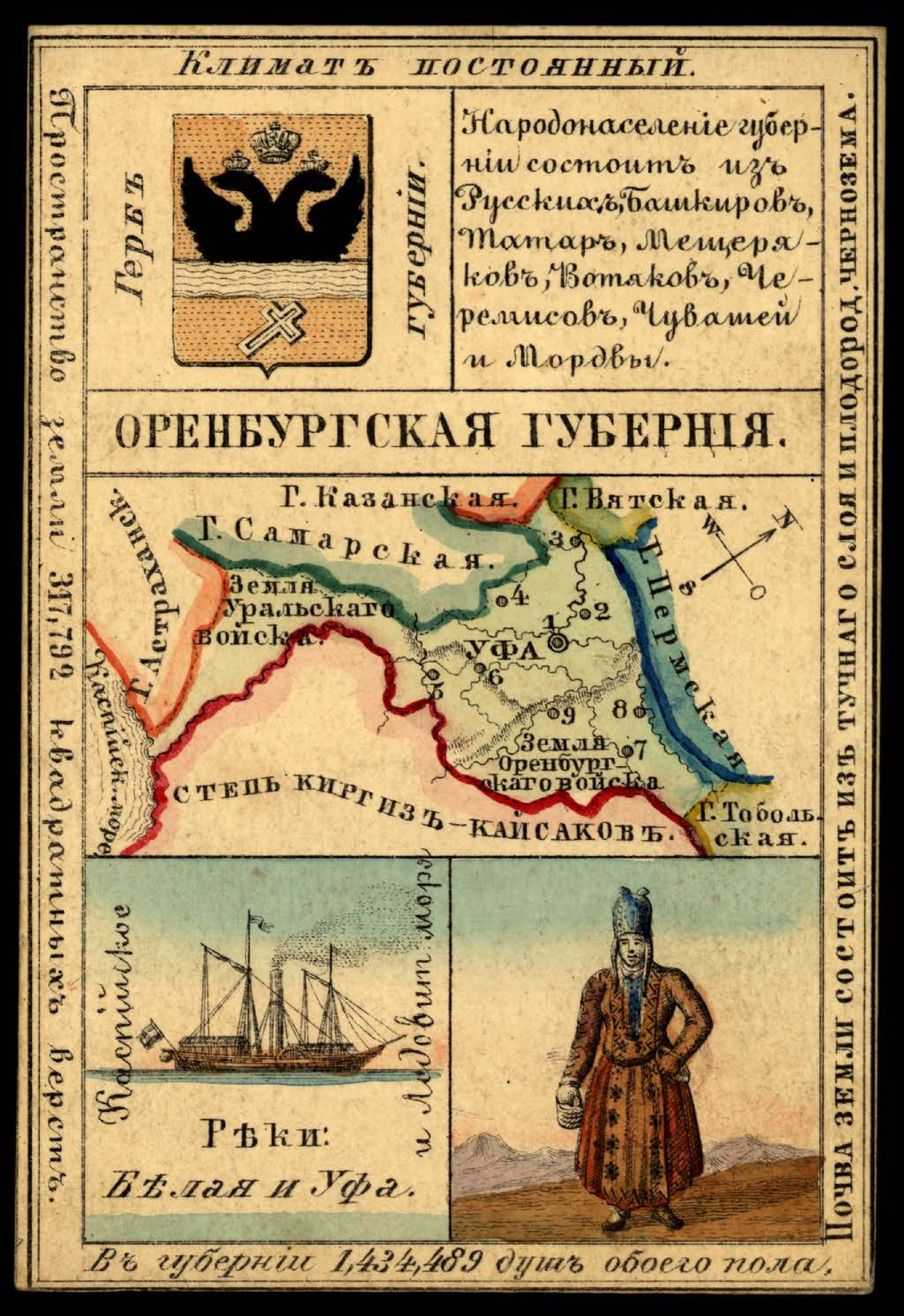
1856.Card from set of geographical cards of the Russian Empire.Orenburg Province

Uyıl is a folksong in Othon-koy style (long long song). There are four options.

The song was first recorded by I. Saltykov in the 1920s. The song is about the military service of Bashkirs on the Orenburg border line.

The song was included in the manuscript collection Bashkir folk melodies. The text was written by Akhnaf Harisov in 1946 in the Ilishevsky district Bashkir ASSR by Sh. Sh. Shurifullin and published in the collection Bashkir folk art (1954, volume 1). Other versions were recorded by M. Baimov, F. Nadrshina, Salawat Salmanov, L.K. Salmanova, poet Rashit Shakur. The song is lyrical and epic. The song "Uyıl" was composed by the Bashkirs carrying the border service on the Orenburg line (southeastern border of the Russian Empire).

== History ==
At the end of the 18th century, after the defeat of the uprising led by Yemelyan Pugachev and Salawat Yulayev, a canton management system was introduced in Bashkortostan. In 1798, the Bashkirs by decree of Emperor Paul I were transferred to the Cossack position (1798-1865). Bashkirs were obliged to take part in military campaigns of the Russian army, and each Bashkir male was to participate in protecting the Russian Empire's border for 25 years. Service members had to participate in many wars and campaigns.

Many songs about the military service of the Bashkirs survive. They relate to classic folk songs. One of them is "Uyıl". The song is associated with the Bashkir's military service in Kazakhstan. The Uyıl River begins in the steppes near Aktyubinsk and goes underground, not reaching the Caspian Sea. The Bashkir army often had to cross the Uyıl River, but more often served in the fortress.

Judging by the words and the dramatic nature of "Uyıl", the song reflects the thoughts of a warrior who is forced to stay in military service for 25 years and who misses his homeland. Two versions of the lyrics survive. "Uyıl" is a song of a wide range (duodecim) and rich ornamentation. The gradual strengthening of the melody enhances the sense of sadness and hopelessness. It was first edited by composer Abrar Gabdrakhmanov for voice and piano as well as for an a capella choir.

In 1937, Lev Lebedinsky recorded in the village of Ibrai, Zianchurinsky district from Sh. Kulmukhametov, «Song of Lenin», where a slightly modified melody of the song "Uyıl" was used.

A variant of "Uyıl", is called "Willow has been grown behind the house" ("Öy artında tal uśterźeñ"). It is included in the manuscript collection Bashkir folk songs.

== Artists ==
Suleiman Abdullin, Azat Ayytkolov, F. F. Gareev, Zaki Makhmutov, Gilman Safargalin, Ramazan Yanbekov, Gulsara Davletgareyeva ensemble “Masem tash” recorded versions of "Uyil".

== Video ==
1. Video on YouTube Honored artist of Bashkortostan Ramazan Yanbekov sings
