= Ernst Muldashev =

Russian surgeon, ophthalmologist

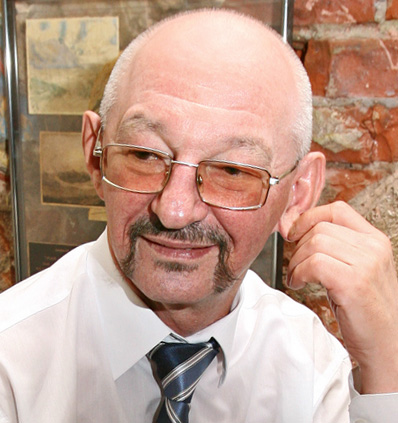
- Born: January 1, 1948; Verkhne-Sermenevo, Beloretsky District, Bashkir Autonomous Soviet Socialist Republic, USSR
- Education: Bashkortostan State Medical University (BSMU)
- Occupation: surgeon ophthalmologist

Ernst Rifgatovich Muldashev (Bashkir: Мулдашев, Эрнст Рифғәт улы; born January 1, 1948, Verkhne-Sermenevo, Beloretsky District, Bashkir Autonomous Soviet Socialist Republic, USSR) is a Russian surgeon ophthalmologist, general director of the All-Russian Center for Ophthalmic and Plastic Surgery in the city of Ufa and author of esoteric books.

== Biography ==
Ernst Muldashev was born on January 1, 1948, in the village of Verkhne-Sermenevo, Beloretsky District, of the Bashkir Autonomous Soviet Socialist Republic. He is the son of Bashkir Rifgat Iskandarovich Muldashev and Ukrainian Valentina Kirsanovna Makhini, brother of Albert Rifgatovich Muldashev and Eduard Rifgatovich Muldashev. From 1955 to 1965 Muldashev studied at the school (First Lyceum) of the city of Salavat.

From 1972 to 1982 he worked as a researcher, head of the department of reconstructive and plastic surgery at the Ufa Research Institute of Eye Diseases. From 1982 to 1988, Muldashev worked as an ophthalmologist in the eye department of Hospital No.10, MSCh OLUNPZ. From 1988 to 1990, he held the position of head of the transplant laboratory for ophthalmic surgery of MNTK "Eye Microsurgery". From 1990, he was a director of the All-Russian Center for Ophthalmic and Plastic Surgery (Ufa).

He has written a number of publications, including monographs.

He has been a member of the Congress of People's Deputies in the early 90s.

=== Ophthalmology ===
Muldashev is an Honored Doctor of the Russian Federation, Doctor of Medical Sciences, Professor. Member of the Board of the Society of Ophthalmologists of Russia. Surgeon of the highest category, honorary consultant at the University of Louisville (USA), a member of the American Academy of Ophthalmology, a certified ophthalmologist in Mexico, a member of the International Academy of Sciences. According to him, he has published more than 400 scientific works, conducts 600-800 eye operations annually.

Muldashev commercialized surgical techniques using a material made from cartilage from deceased donors he calls Alloplant. He claims this material, surgically implanted in the eye, will help cure or stop the progression of a vast array of diseases and conditions, such as retinitis pigmentosa, diabetic retinopathy, age-related macular degeneration, optic nerve atrophy, glaucoma, progressive myopia and retinopathy of prematurity. Expert ophthalmologists contacted by the media say scientific literature include no studies validating Muldashev's claims about Alloplant.

=== Esoteric books ===
Muldashev is the author of books on mysticism, presenting pseudo-scientific theories relating to the origin of humanity. He has also presented many other theories in his book "Where do we come from" about the importance of the facial features around the eye.

The gene pool of mankind, according to Muldashev, is a hypothetical formation, which is a collection of somati caves located mainly in the Himalayas, in which people of previous civilizations are in a "preserved" state (somati or samadhi).

To finally unravel the secrets of this mystical country of Shambhala, an expedition of Russian scientists and climbers went to Tibet. The participants of the expedition RATT (Russian Adventure Travel Team), organized by the Russian Geographical Society with the support of Komsomolskaya Pravda, examined the area of Mount Kailash, under which an underground country is supposedly located. Scientists went up to the almost inaccessible “door to Shambhala”, examined the “stone laser”, and visited the mysterious “Death Valley”.

=== Personal life ===
He married Tatyana Muldasheva.

== Awards and honors ==
- Bronze medal of the Exhibition of Economic Achievements of the USSR, 1986;
- "Honored Doctor of the Russian Federation", 1998;
- Order of Salavat Yulaev - State Award of the Republic of Bashkortostan, 2000;
- Medal "For outstanding services to national health care”, 2001;
- Order of Friendship of Peoples, 2007.

== Publications ==
=== Books ===
- В поисках Города Богов. Том 1. Трагическое послание древних. (2002) 544 стр. Тираж: 50000. ISBN 978-5-373-01414-4;
- В поисках Города Богов. Том 2. Золотые пластины Харати (2002);
- В поисках Города Богов. Том 3. В объятиях Шамбалы. (2002) 528 стр. Тираж: 3000. ISBN 978-5-373-02988-9;
- В поисках Города Богов. Том 4. Предисловие к Матрице жизни на Земле (2002);
- В поисках Города Богов. Том 5. Матрица Жизни на Земле (2002);
- Трагическое послание древних;
- В объятиях Шамбалы;
- Золотые пластины Харати. Том 1. 320 стр. Тираж: 3000. ISBN 978-5-373-02987-2;
- Золотые пластины Харати. Том 2. 320 стр. Тираж: 180000. ISBN 978-5-373-00031-4;
- От кого мы произошли? Часть I Встреча с мастером (1999);
- От кого мы произошли? Часть II. Что сказали тибетские ламы (1999);
- От кого мы произошли? Часть III Мир сложнее, чем мы думали (1999);
- Загадочная аура России. 400 стр. ISBN 978-5-373-02148-7;
- Матрица жизни на Земле. 624 стр. Тираж: 2500;
- В объятиях Дракулы. 392 стр. Тираж: 5000;
- Путеводитель по загадочным местам планеты. (Э. Мулдашев, Н. Зятьков). Тираж 4000. ISBN 978-5-373-02990-2, ISBN 978-5-373-01397-0.

== Critical publications of Muldashev ==
- Балашевич Л. И. Трансгималайский сказочник с точки зрения ученого-офтальмолога // Здравый смысл. — No. 27. — 2003;
- Образцов П. А. (2004). АнтиМулдашев. От кого произошёл уфимский офтальмолог? (PDF) (15000 экз ed.). М.: Яуза, Эксмо. ISBN 5-699-06943-7. Archived from the original (PDF) on 2016-03-09.
- Образцов П. А. (2005). Азбука шамбалоидов. Мулдашев и все-все-все. АнтиМулдашев (9000 экз ed.). М.: Яуза, Пресском. ISBN 5-98083-038-3. Archived from the original on 2017-06-02.
- Тревогин П. (кандидат технических наук) От кого мы произошли?" // журнал «Наука — это жизнь!»;
- Древние пирамиды в Колорадо?.., Илья Трейгер;
- И снова колорадские пирамиды!, Илья Трейгер.
