= Salawati (disambiguation) =

Salawati is one of the four major islands in the Raja Ampat Islands in Southwest Papua, Indonesia.

It may also refer to:

- Salawati Daud, Indonesian communist politician
- Salawati language, part of Ma'ya language
- Salawati Kingdom, one of the kingdoms in Raja Ampat Islands

== See also ==
- Salawat (disambiguation)
- Salavat (disambiguation)
