= Monument to Zagir Ismagilov =

Monument in Ufa, Russia

Coordinates: 54.7231°N 55.9453°E

- Bashkir: Заһир Исмәғилев һәйкәле Zahir Isma’g’ilev ha’ka’le
- Interactive map of Monument to Zagir Ismagilov
- Location: Bashkortostan, Ufa
- Opening date: 2008
- Dedicated to: Zagir Ismagilov

The Monument to Zagir Ismagilov (Bashkir: Заһир Исмәғилев һәйкәле, romanized: Zahir Isma’g’ilev ha’ka’le) is a monument to composer Zagir Ismagilov. It is located at Bashkir State Opera and Ballet Theatre in Ufa, Bashkortostan. It opened in 2008.

The author of the monument is Khanif Khabibrakhmanov. The architect is Sergey Goldobin.

On October 18, 2008 the official opening of the monument was held.

== Appearance ==
The statue depicts Zagir Ismagilov sitting on a chair at a moment of creative inspiration. In his hand is a kurai made of reed. The sculpture is made of bronze. There is an inscription on the pedestal, made in both Bashkir and Russian languages:"The outstanding Bashkir composer Zagir Ismagilov" (Russian: «Выдающийся башкирский композитор Загир Исмагилов»).
