= Salawat (disambiguation) =

Salawat (plural of Salat) or aṣ-ṣalātu ʿala -n-nabī (from Arabic: الصلاة على النبي), an invocation which Muslims make by saying specific phrases to compliment prophet Muhammad

It may also refer to:

- Salawat Yulayev (1754–1800), Bashkir national hero who participated in Pugachev's Rebellion
- Salawat (album), album by Mesut Kurtis

== See also ==
- Salavat Yulayev (film), a 1941 Soviet film directed by Yakov Protazanov
- Salawat Yulayev (opera), opera in three acts by the Bashkir composer Zagir Ismagilov
- Salavat Yulaev Ufa, professional ice hockey team based in Ufa in the Republic of Bashkortostan, a federal subject of the Russian Federation
- Salawati (disambiguation)
- Darood (disambiguation)
