= The crane song =

Bashkir folk tale

The crane song (Сыңрау торна) is a Bashkir folk tale and song. Based on this fairy tale, the ballet "Crane Song" was staged in 1944.

== History ==
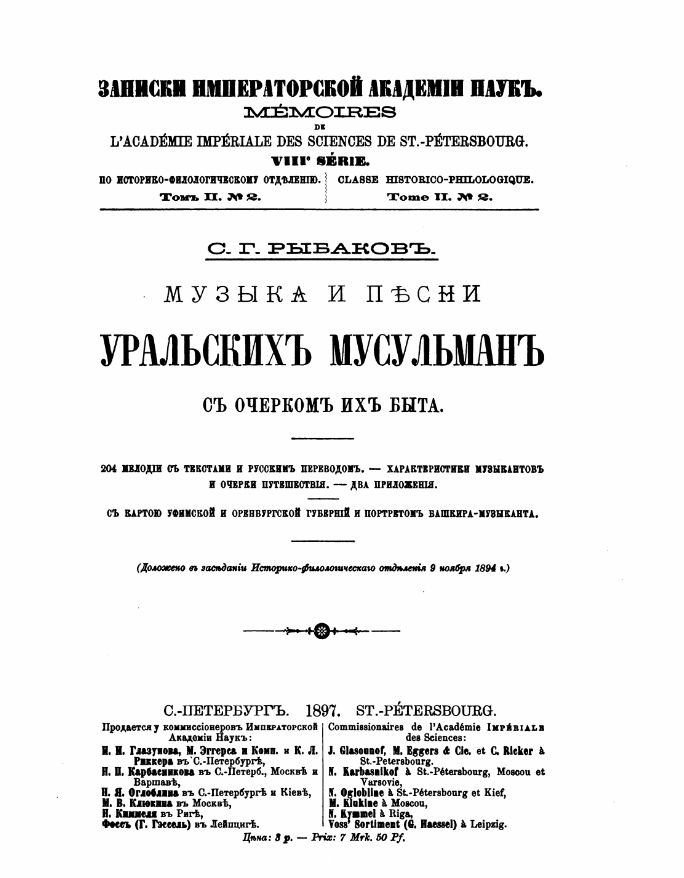
Sergey Rybakovs book

By tradition, before performing a song, the Bashkirs always told the story of the creation of the song.So every song has its own story.

The Bashkir tale and melody "Crane Song" were first published in 1894 by the composer, ethnographer Sergey Rybakov in his book "Music and Songs of the Ural Muslims with Essays on Their Life".

Based on the plot of the fairy tale, the ballet "Crane Song" was staged in 1944 at the Bashkir State Opera and Ballet Theater in Ufa. Music by Zahir Ismagilov and Lev Stepanov. Libretto by Fayzi Gaskarov.

It was the first ballet that six-year-old Rudolf Nureyev saw in Ufa.

In 1960, the ballet "Crane Song" was filmed by the Sverdlovsk Film Studio.

== Plot ==
In ancient times, there lived a mighty hero. He had no equal in strength, courage and intelligence. The young man was a renowned musician (he played quray, bashkir longitudinal flute) and a singer. The hero got married, his wife bore him a son. His son was like his father in everything. He grew up and the father decided to marry his son. One day the young man went on horseback to his bride's father and left his horse nearby to graze in the meadow.

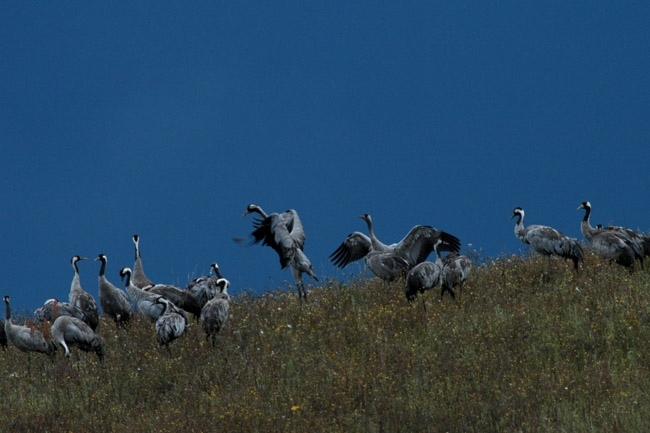
The Common cranes

In the morning, when the young man came for the horse, he heard a beautiful melody and ran towards the sounds. Approaching, he began to observe. A flock of cranes was playing in the clearing. In the center stood a grey crane. When the bird flapped wings, it hummed melodicly. Everyone else joined it and began to circle around him.

The young man remembered the melody, jumped on his horse and rushed to his father-in-law's house. He took the quray and began playing the crane song. The people were listening with rapt attention to the melody. One old man stepped forward and reminded people that the crane dances portend a great disaster, a big battle in which many people will die.

The old warrior gave his weapon to his son and ordered to gather an army. Soon the enemy invaded their land. The brave young hero with his army defeated the enemies.

Since then people called that melody "The Crane Song".

The lake where the battle took place is called Yaugul (Battle+Lake). It is located in the Baymaksky District of Bashkortostan.

Earlier people were afraid to sing this melody often.

During his long journey to the Volga region in 921-922,Ahmed ibn Fadlan, among other things, wrote down the story of how the cranes helped the Bashkirs defeat their enemies.

== See also ==
- Quray
- Zagir Ismagilov

== Song notes ==
•БАШҠОРТ ХАЛҠ ЙЫРҘАРЫ - Х.Әхмәтов, А.Харасов, Л.Лебединский (1954г)

•Башҡорттың йөҙ йыры

== Notes ==
- Legend of the Crane song (ru)
- Гран-па башкирского балета: памяти Зайтуны Насретдиновой
- Flowers were laid at Rudolf Nureyev bas-relief on Bashkir Opera Theater on his birthday
- Башкирские легенды и предания
- The Crane Song
- Л.Аралбаева. Сыңрау торна быуаттар төпкөлөнән килгән легендар көй
- Ибн Фадлан. Книга о путешествии на Волгу
- Ballet "The crane song"
