= Bayazit Bikbay =

Russian and Soviet poet, writer and playwright

Bayezit Bikbay
- Born: Bayazit Gayazovich Bikbay; 10 January 1909; Novorfltaevo village, Orenburg uezd (county), Orenburg Governorate, Russian Empire (now Kuyurgazinsky District, Bashkortostan, Russia)
- Died: 2 September 1968 (aged 59); Ufa, Bashkir Republic, (now Bashkortostan, Russia)
- Citizenship: Russian Empire, USSR
- Education: Orenburg Bashkir Pedagogical College
- Occupations: Poet, novelist, playwright, librettist
- Writing career
- Notable works: Long Live Life! (poems) Glory to the Ground (poems); Karlugas (play) Salawat Yulayev (opera)
- Notable awards: Order of the Red Banner of Labour Order of the Badge of Honour Salawat Yulayev Award; 1970, posthumously

Bayazit Bikbay (Bashkir: Баязит Биҡбай, full name Bayazit Gayazovich Bikbay; 9 January 1909 – 2 September 1968), was a Russian and Soviet poet, writer and playwright. He wrote in Bashkir.

== Life and career ==
Bayazit Bikbay was born in 1909. Between 1929 and 1936, he worked in various Bashkir-language media, in particular, between 1932 and 1936 in the newspaper Bashkurdistan. In 1932, he published his first collection of poems, titled Current days. He subsequently published Beyond the Forest, Bright Land, and The Libretto, which was based on stories of the life of Bashkir national hero Salawat Yulayev. In 1937 Bikbay performed the drama "Karlugas" for the first time. He also published many one-act plays.

During World War II, Bikbay was unable to serve along the Eastern Front for health reasons. Instead, he published poetry and plays, often incorporating military themes into his collections. During this time, Bikbay published I Praise the Earth, Fire Line, Homeland Calling (Watan Saҡyra, 1943) and Children of the Same Family (Ber Tuғandar, 1944). Between 1941 and 1943 he served as the chair of the Bashkir Writers Union.

Over the course of his career, Bikbay wrote more than forty books, poetry collections, essays, short stories, plays, and libretti. including the novel, When Bottled Akselyan. He also translated the classic Russian literature of Tolstoy, Turgenev and Gorky.

In 1984, a street in Ufa was named after him.
