= Darood =

Darood can mean:

- Darod, a Somali clan
- Durood or salawat, a phrase complimenting Muhammad

== See also ==
- Salawat (disambiguation)
