= Alloplant =

Biomaterial with alleged regenerative properties

Alloplant is a biomaterial made from cartilage used for eye surgery in some clinics in Russia. Experts warn that claims about its alleged regenerative properties by its inventor have not been documented in medical literature.

== Origin ==
The compound has been developed by Bashkir ophthalmologist and mystic Ernst Muldashev in the 1970s. Muldashev claims to have invented Allplant after an expedition in Tibet gave him innate and unprecedented understanding of certain worldly ideas and concepts beyond peer-reviewed medicine.

According to Muldashev, Alloplant is biomaterial harvested from recently deceased donors. He used Alloplant in eye surgery to improve the rejection rate of tissue grafts. After a high-profile case in 2000 where a patient gained some eye function despite an allegedly incurable condition, Muldashev eventually gained government support to use his compound at an ophthalmology and plastic surgery clinic in his home city of Ufa.

== Claims ==
Muldashev has claimed variously that Alloplant works by regenerating dead tissue it's in contact with, or by attracting stem cells that proceed to differentiate to rebuild damaged structures in the eye, or prevent further spread of the condition.

He claims this material, surgically implanted in the eye, will help cure or stop the progression of a vast array of diseases and conditions, such as retinitis pigmentosa, diabetic retinopathy, age-related macular degeneration, optic nerve atrophy, glaucoma, progressive myopia and retinopathy of prematurity.

Expert ophthalmologists contacted by the media say scientific literature include no studies validating Muldashev's claims about Alloplant. In 2009, the ophthalmologist-in-chief for the University Health Network insisted the treatment had not been presented or discussed in medical conferences. The chief of clinical trials at the U.S. National Institutes of Health's Eye Institute indicated she was unaware of Allopant. Two ophthalmologists from Nevada had published a paper in 2008 concluding that the alloplant method reduced intraocular pressure, one of the main ways of treating glaucoma, and assisted tissue regeneration.
