= Äxmät Bikçäntäyef =

- Born: 20 February 1911 (in Julian calendar); Olı Mäñgär (Russian Empire)
- Died: 12 November 1985; Kazan

Äxmät Bikçäntäyef (Tatar: Әхмәт Бикчәнтәев, Äxmät Bikçäntäyef, أحمد بيكچەنتەيف, Tatar pronunciation: [æχˈmæt bikɕænˈtæjɘf], 1911 – 1985) was an architect.

== Biography ==
Äxmät Bikçäntäyef was born in 1911 in the village of Olı Mäñgär. In 1931–1938 he received professional education in Qazan and Leningrad institutes of municipal construction engineers; after the completion of studies he worked in the architectural and planning workshop under the Qazan City Executive Committee. Between 1939 and 1945, Bikçäntäyef served in the Red Army and participated in Soviet occupation of Bessarabia and Northern Bukovina and German–Soviet War. Since 1947 he worked at Kazan Institute of Civil Engineering, receiving a titile of professor in 1981; at the same time Bikçäntäyef was a chairman of the Union of Architects of the Tatar ASSR (1967–1970).

== Works ==
- The building of the Kazan Institute of Civil Engineering (1947)
- The building of Qazan State University's chemical faculty (1953)
- administrative center of the village of Şäpşe TASSR's Biektaw district
- several Stalin style residential houses in Qazan.

== Awards ==
- Honored Artist of the Tatar ASSR (1969)
- Laureate of the USSR Council of Ministers Award (1973)
- Honored Architect of the RSFSR (1980)
