= Salavat Yulayev Cave =

Cave in Russia

Coordinates: 53°36′4.3″N 56°38′50.5″E

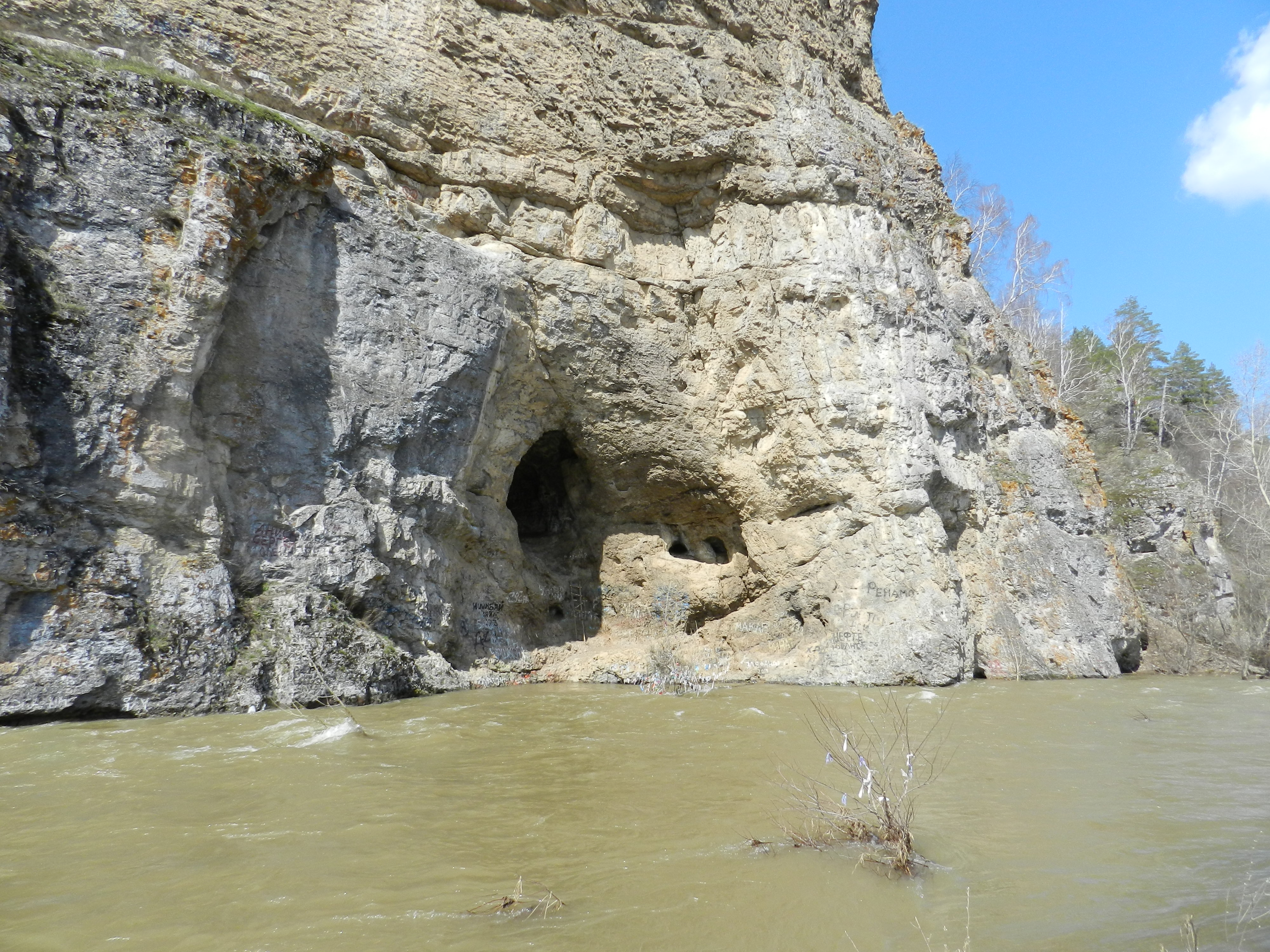
Salavat Yulayev Cave and River Sikasya

The Salavat Yulayev Cave, also known as the Cave of Salavat Yulayev or Salavat Cave (Bashkir: Салауат мәмерйәһе) is a cave located in the Ishimbaysky District, Bashkortostan, Russia, and is seven kilometers from the village of Makarovo. The cave forms part of the Kalim-Uscan rock, which is located under the Sikasya river; it is composed of three distinct levels and is around 35 meters long. The cave was named after the film Salavat Yulaev as filming was done there, despite a local belief that it was the cave where Bashkir hero Salavat Yulaev hid.
