= Kiyauk =

Location
- Country: Bashkortostan, Russia

Physical characteristics
- Mouth: Zigan
  - coordinates: 53°42′16″N 56°23′29″E
- Length: 18 km (11 mi)
- Basin size: 76 km^{2} (29 sq mi)

Basin features
- Progression: Zigan→ Belaya→ Kama→ Volga→ Caspian Sea

The Kiyauk (Russian: Кияук; Bashkir: Ҡыяуыҡ, Qıyawıq) is a river in Ishimbaysky District, Bashkortostan, Russia. It is a left tributary of the Zigan. It is 18 kilometres (11 mi) long, and its drainage basin covers 76 square kilometres (29 mi^{2}).

On the shore near the river were found skeletal remains of a mammoth—teeth and tusks up to 5 feet (1.5 m) long, and other parts.
