= Monument to Salavat Yulaev =

Statue in Ufa, Russia

Coordinates: 54.7185°N 55.9260°E

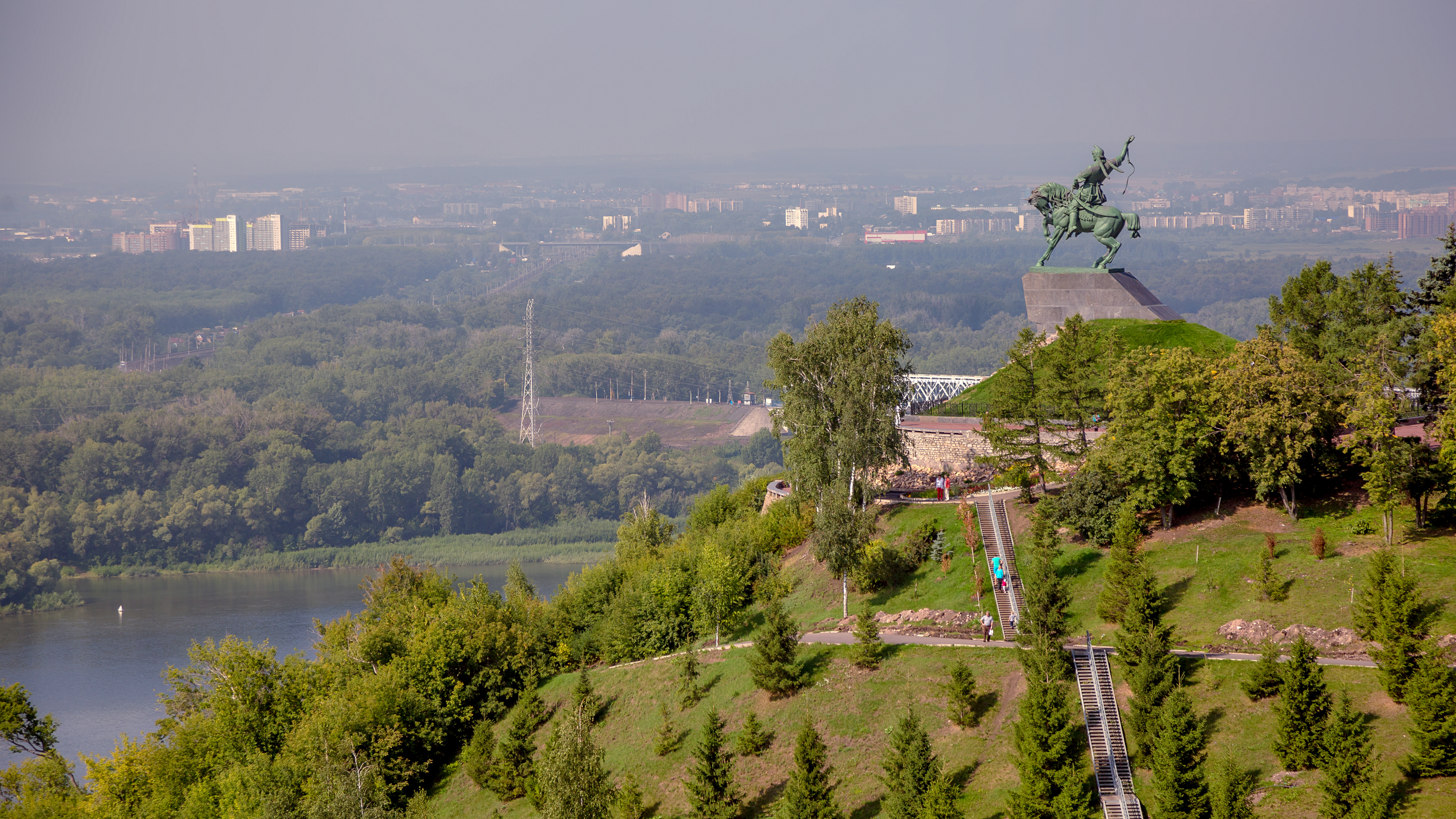
- Interactive map of Monument to Salavat Yulaev
- Location: Ufa, Bashkortostan
- Designer: Soslanbek Tavasiev; Ismagil Gainutdinov
- Material: bronzed iron, granite pedestal
- Height: 9.8 metres (32 ft)
- Opening date: 17 November 1967
- Dedicated to: Salawat Yulayev

The Monument to Salavat Yulaev (Note: Bashkir: Салауат Юлаев һәйкәле, romanized: Salawat Yulayev häykäle, IPA: [sɑɫɑˈwɑt jʊˈɫajɪf hæjkæˈlɪ̞]; Russian: Памятник Салавату Юлаеву, romanized: Pamjatnik Salavatu Julajevu, IPA: [ˈpamʲɪtʲnʲɪk səɫɐˈvatʊ jʊˈɫajɪvʊ]) (Russian: Памятник Салавату Юлаеву) is a monument to the Bashkir national hero Salawat Yulayev. It is located in Ufa, the capital city of the Republic of Bashkortostan in European Russia. The monument is represented in the coat of arms of Bashkortostan. It was built in 1967. It was dismantled for restoration in 2025 and will be reinstalled in 2027.

== History ==
For the first time, Soslanbek Tavasiev heard about Salawat Yulayev, in July 1941, when he was evacuated to Bashkortostan from Moscow, because on 22 June 1941 Germany launched a war against the Soviet Union. The family of Soslanbek Tavasiev was evacuated to the Bashkir village of Sterlibashevo. At the local market, Tavasiev heard an emotional speech from a local resident that the country needed heroes like Salawat.

The author decided to portray the hero at the moment when Salawat leads the army to help Pugachev to Orenburg (1774). On the mountain, the horseman decisively stops his horse, and calls on people to go to fight. This moment formed the basis of the plot of the composition. Tavasiev was thinking about the future development of Ufa and wanted the sculpture to stand here for a long time and be visible from all sides. Therefore, he chose one of the highest places in the city, at the end of Chishminskaya Street on a hill before descending to the Agidel (Belaya) River.

The installation of the architectural composition in this place was associated with financial difficulties, it would have to demolish dozens of private houses and resettle tenants. But the sculptor did not agree to erect the monument in another place. Tavasiev worked on the monument to Salawat Yulaev for 20 years.

The monument created by the national sculptor, monumentalist and artist of North Ossetia and Bashkortostan Soslanbek Tavasiev was unveiled on 17 November 1967 and on the high bank Belaya river in Ufa. The monument to Salavat became the hallmark of Ufa and a national treasure. The image of the monument is on coat of arms of Bashkortostan.

The monument is unique in that with a weight of 40 tons it has only three fulcrum points. The height of the monument reaches 9.8 meters, with a pedestal 14 m.

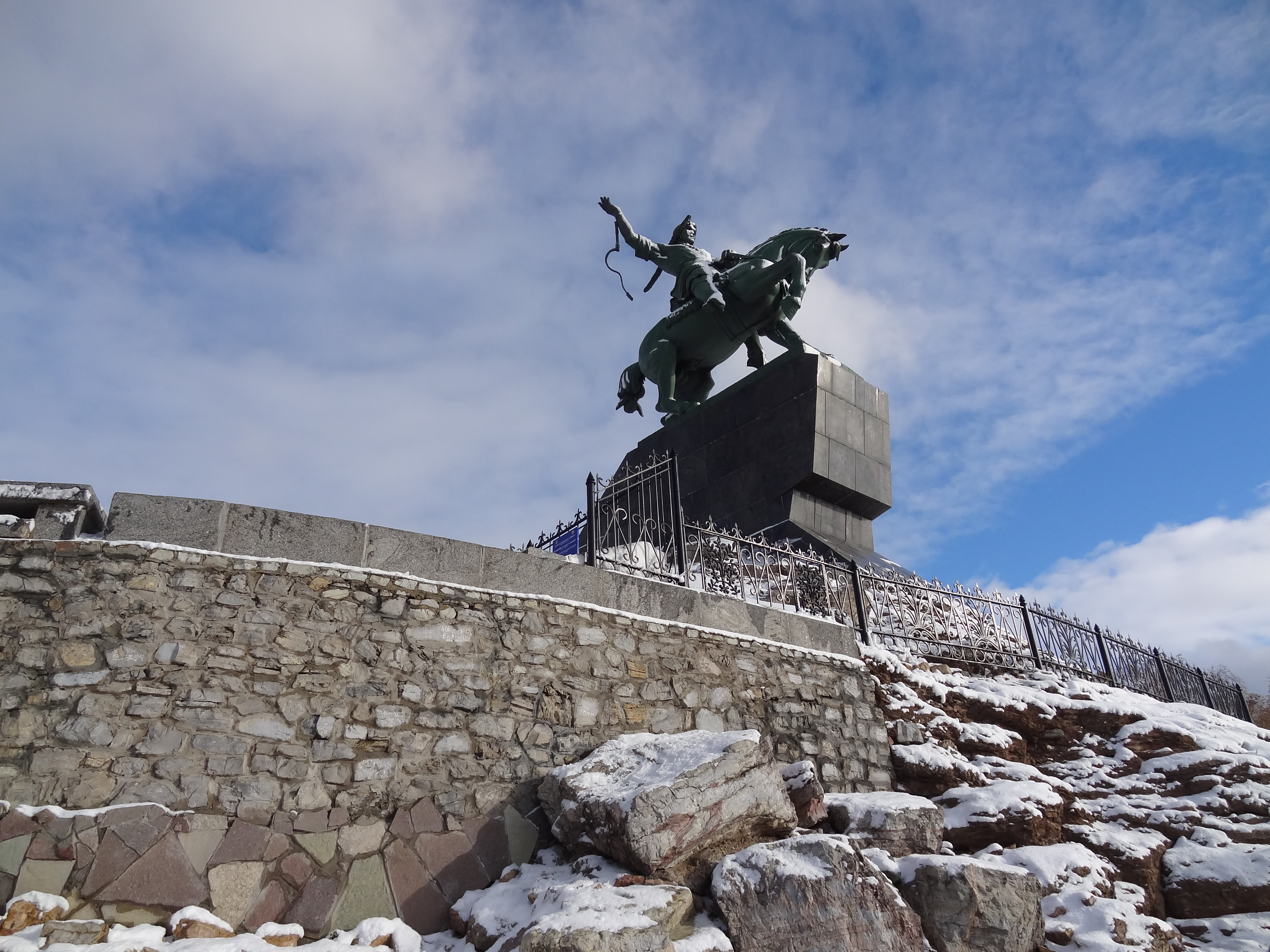
Salawat Yulayev monument

The full-scale model of the monument made of gypsum was completed by 1963, was discussed by specialists in Moscow and officially adopted by the board of the Ministry of Culture of the USSR. Then Tavasiev brought her to Ufa, where she was installed in the lobby Bashkir State Opera and Ballet Theater.

The sculptor finalized the monument, taking into account the comments of the residents of Ufa. The sculpture was cast for a month and a half at the Leningrad plant "Monument sculpture." To strengthen the sculpture, a steel frame was installed inside it, embedded in a reinforced concrete pedestal and passed through its resting legs, the hollow body of the horse and the figure of the rider.

In 1970, for the monument to Salawat Yulayev, Soslanbek Dafaevich Tavasiev was awarded State Prize of the USSR.

== Composition ==
The monument is a sculpture of Salawat Yulayev on a horse. In his right hand, Salavat holds a whip, and a saber is mounted on his left side. The monument is made of bronze cast iron. The pedestal is made of reinforced concrete, lined with granite slabs. The area around the monument is lined with colored plates and landscaped. The monument is fenced with openwork metal bars.

== Facts ==
- The monument is a place of pilgrimage for tourists. From the rock on which the monument stands, overlooks the Belaya River and the surrounding nature.
- The monument is included in the Seven Wonders of Bashkortostan.

External images
- Рабочие Ленинградского завода "Монументскульптура" со скульптором С. Д. Тавасиевым (в центре) у памятника Салавату Юлаеву. 1963г.
- Установка памятника

== Gallery ==
Monument to Salavat Yulaev on the Coat of arms of Bashkortostan

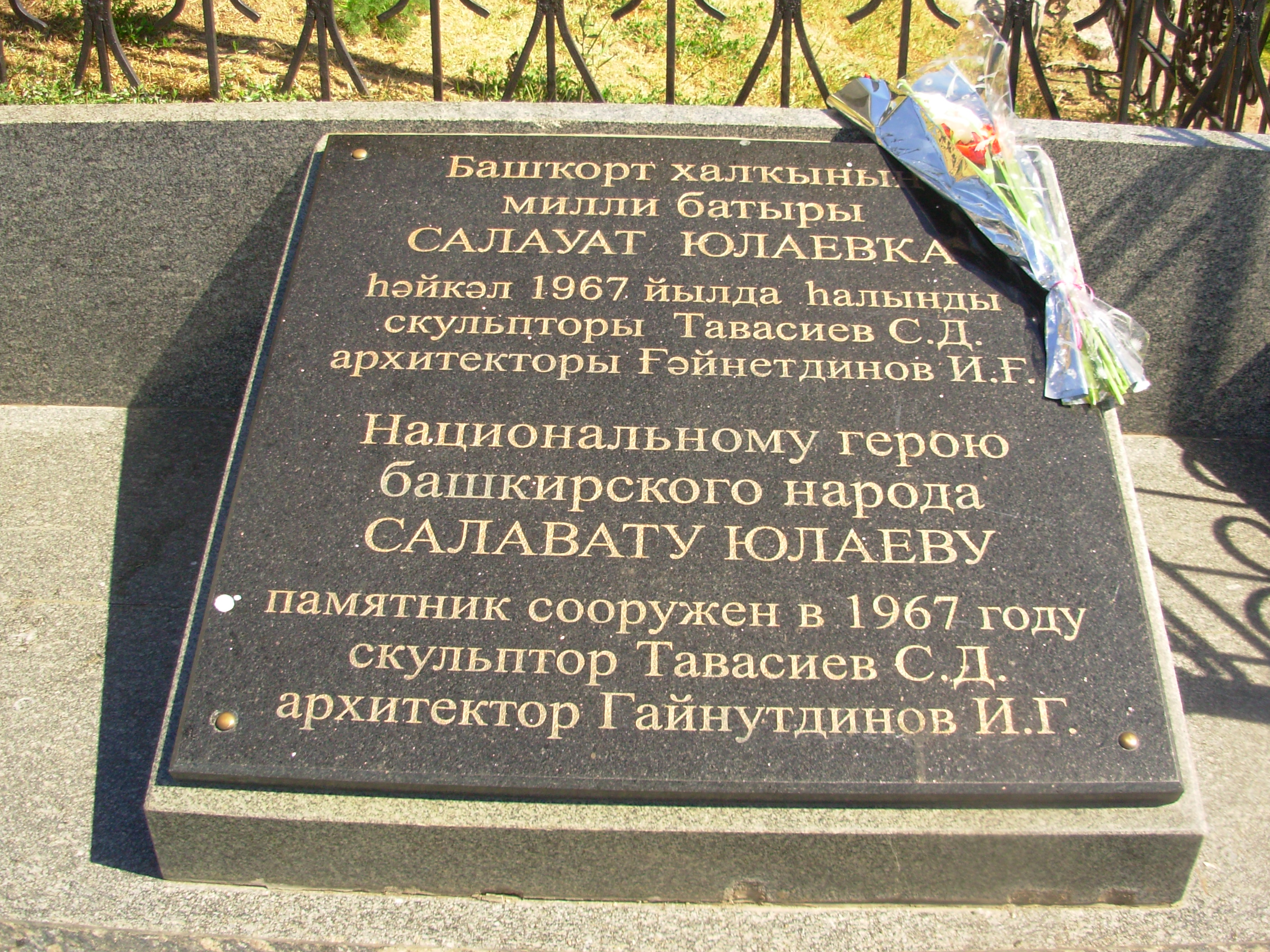
Board located at the monument.
