= Salawat Yulayev (opera) =

1955 opera by Zagir Ismagilov

Salavat Yulaev
- Opera by Zagir Garipovich Ismagilov
- Native title: Салават Юлаев
- Librettist: Bayezit Bikbay
- Language: Bashkir
- Based on: Life of Salawat Yulayev
- Premiere: 1955; Bashkir Opera and Ballet Theater

Salawat Yulayev (Russian: Салават Юлаев) is an opera in four acts and seven scenes by the Bashkir composer Zagir Ismagilov.

The libretto was written by Bayezit Bikbay, based on stories from the life of the Bashkir national hero, Salawat Yulayev. It is the first national opera written in the Bashkir language and premiered in 1955 at the Decade of Bashkir Literature and Art in Moscow in its original four-act version. Recent performances have broken the opera into two parts (part 1 – four scenes, part 2 – three scenes), rather than following the traditional act-based format. The work was later edited and re-premiered on September 10, 2004, at the Bashkir State Opera and Ballet Theatre with only three acts. The role of Salavat Yulaev was originally sung by the first notable opera singer from the Bashkir region, Khabir Galimov. In subsequent performances, the opera singer Magafur Khismatullin sang the role.

== Music ==
Ismagilov used the Bashkir folk song, "Salavat" and the Russian folk song "Не шуми, ты, мать зелёная дубравушка" (Don't make noise, mother, green oak forest) within his score.

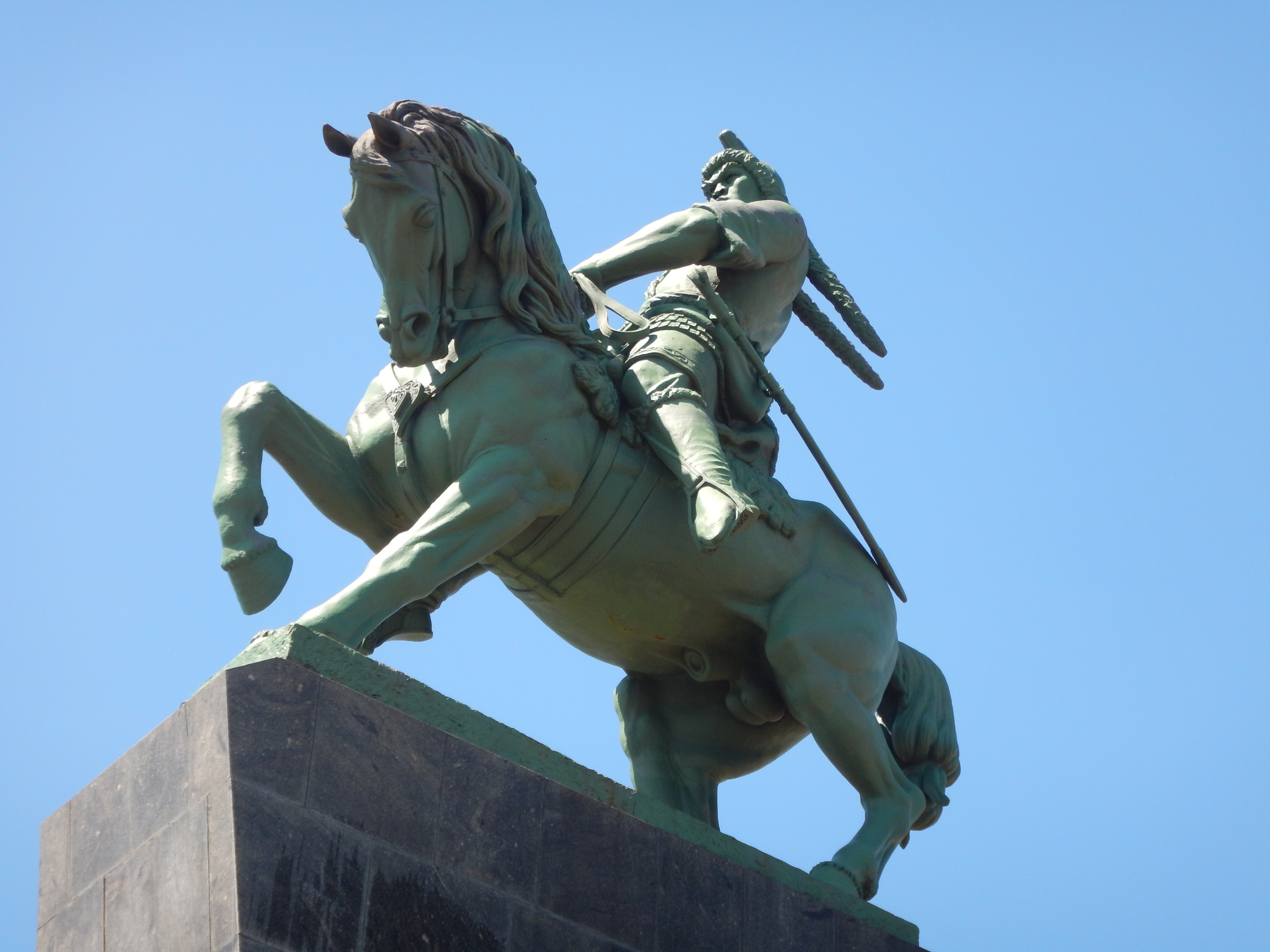
Monument to Salavat Yulaev (Ufa, 1967)
