= Filipp Nefyodov =

Russian writer, journalist, editor, ethnographer and archeologist

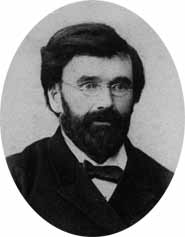
- Born: Филипп Диомидович Нефёдов; October 18, 1838; Ivanovo, Russian Empire
- Died: March 25, 1902 (aged 63); Vladimir Governorate, Russian Empire
- Occupations: writer, journalist, editor, ethnographer, archeologist

Filipp Diomidovich Nefyodov (Филипп Диомидович Нефёдов, 18 October 1838 in Ivanovo, Vladimir Governorate, Russian Empire – 25 March 1902 in Vladimir Governorate, Russian Empire) was a Russian writer, journalist, editor (Remeslennaya Gazeta, 1875-1876; Russky Kurjer, 1879), ethnographer and archeologist who made hundreds of excavations in Povolzhye, Ural and West Siberia, studying ancient kurgans.

Nefyodov have always sympathized with the Russian left radicalism; in March 1881, after the assassination of Tsar Alexander II, he was arrested and briefly incarcerated for having links with Sophia Perovskaya and Andrei Zhelyabov. He is credited with being the first in Russia to publish the story of Salawat Yulayev, a legendary Bashkir rebel, whose name up until then it had been considered risky to mention.

Nefyodov's critically acclaimed short story collection Na miru (На миру, Among People) came out in 1872. The Works of Filipp Nefyodov in 4 volumes was published in 1894-1900.
