= Zagir Ismagilov =

Bashkir composer (1917–2003)

- Заһир Исмәғилев
- Born: January 8, 1917; Sermenevo, Orenburg Governorate, Russian Empire
- Died: May 30, 2003 (aged 86); Ufa, Russia
- Occupations: Composer; teacher

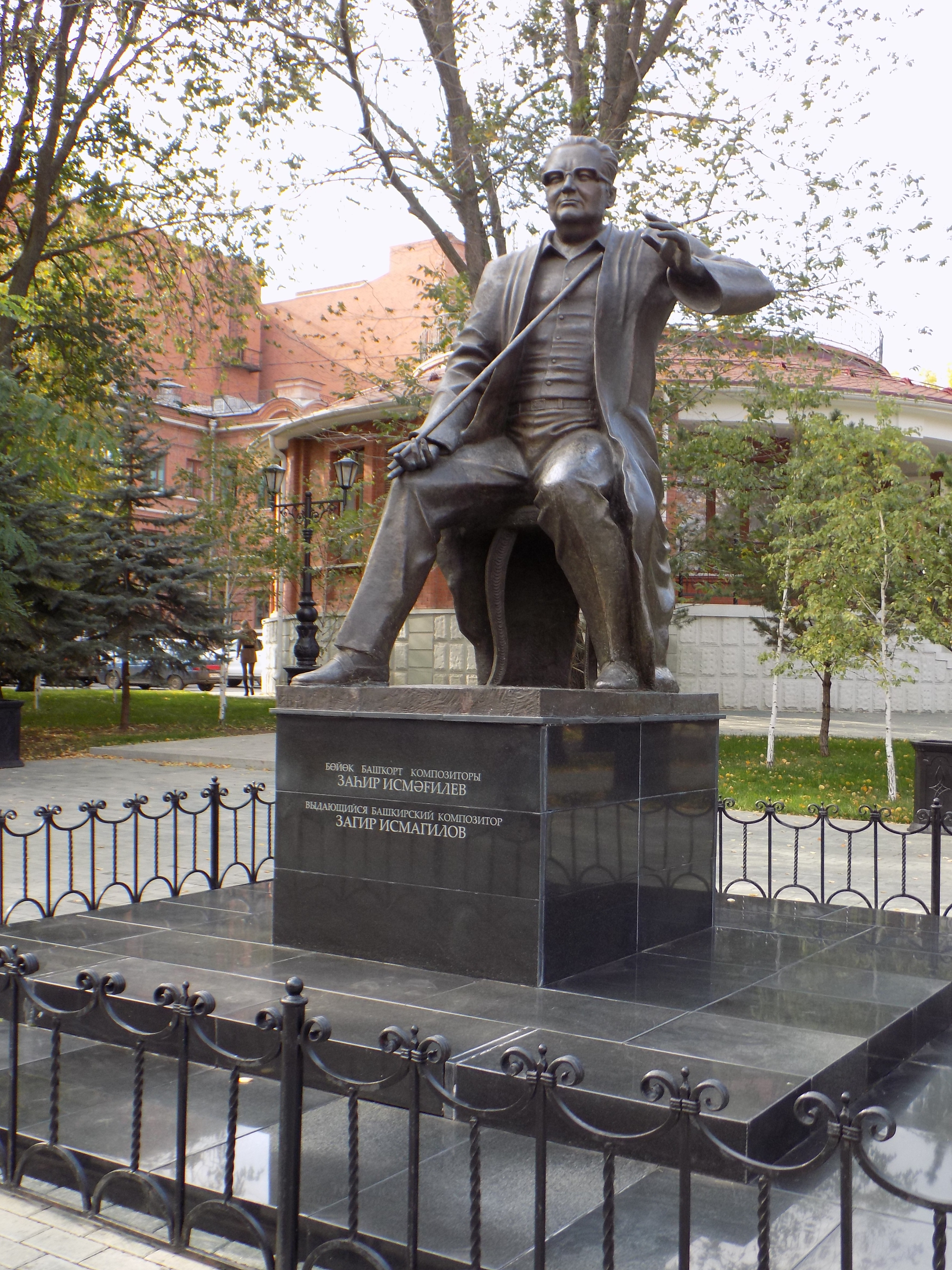
Monument in Ufa

Zagir Gharif uly Ismagilov (Note: Bashkir: Заһир Ғариф улы Исмәғилев, romanized: Zaḣir Gharif uly Ismăghilev; Russian: Загир Гарипович Исмагилов, romanized: Zagir Garipovich Ismagilov) (January 8, [O.S. December 26, 1916] 1917 – May 30, 2003) was a Soviet Bashkir composer and pedagogue. He was granted the title People's Artist of the USSR in 1982, and was a member of the Communist Party of the Soviet Union since 1943. The performing arts center in Ufa, Russia is named after him. The first rector and founder of the Ufa Institute of arts (1968–1988) (associate professor since 1973, professor since 1977).

== Biography ==
The son of a woodcutter, the composer was born January 8, 1917, in the village of Sermenevo. Zagir had three brothers and a sister, who died in 1921 of typhoid fever.

Ismagilov studied in the Bashkir seven-year school in the village of Nijne-Sermenevo. From the beginning of his studies, the future composer was interested in the native folk music of the Bashkir people, and learned to play the quray. In 1932 he went to study at the Inzer wood-chemical school. He graduated early and began working in Beloretsk lespromhoz appraiser. In 1935, Arslan Mubaryakov invited him to take part in the Bashkir Academic Drama Theatre, Ufa, where he played in the evenings as a quray player (musician). During the days he studied at the music studio, which opened in Ufa (1936). In 1937, Ismagilov went to study at the Bashkir studio of the Moscow Conservatory.

During World War II he worked in Ufa, was part of concerts given for front-line troops, and composed patriotic songs. After the war, he finished training in the studio in 1948, then became part of the music composition faculty at the Moscow Conservatory.

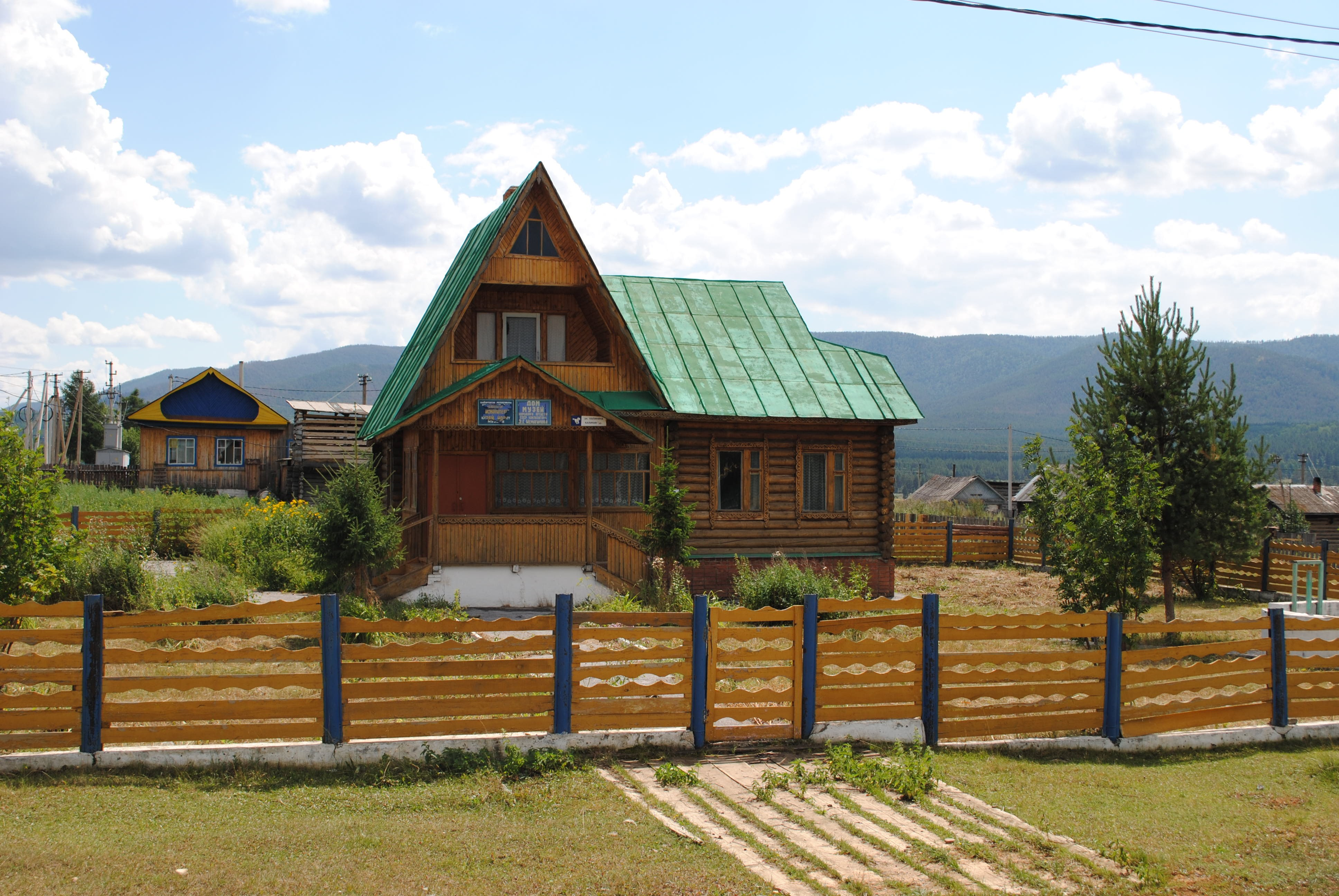
Museum after Zagir Ismagilov in the village of Sermenevo, Bashkortostan

Ismagilov became chairman of the Union of Composers of the Bashkir Republic in 1958. And in 1968 he was the founder and first rector of the UFA Institute of Arts, where he remained until 1988. He was a deputy of the Supreme Soviet of Bashkortostan for many years, and was eventually elected its chairman.

The composer's works were performed in Russia, the republics of the former National Union (now CIS) and internationally (Bulgaria, China, Romania, North Korea, Yugoslavia, and Ethiopia). Additionally, they were published and recorded by the record production company, "Melodiya", and are available in the stock records of Bashkir radio and TV.

Zagir Ismagilov contributed to the development of national opera, chamber vocal, choral and instrumental music in the Soviet Union. His work expresses the ideological themes of working in harmony, friendship and love, and reflects the civil-patriotic, national creative ideal. The composer developed the tradition of classical Russian music culture, their history and musical-dramatic concepts. Ismagilov's work has had a national historic theme, with strong influence from his Bashkir heritage. His opera Salawat Yulayev tells the story of a national hero, while the epic opera The Ambassadors of the Urals, about accession of Bashkirs to Russia, and Kahym-Turea tells the story of a military commander who led the Bashkirs against Napoleon in 1812. The opera Akmulla is based on the life of the Bashkir poet and educator of the 19th century. Ismagilov's works ranges from operas like Shaura and Waves Agideli, to musical comedies such as Codasa and Almakay.

The first rector and founder of the Ufa Institute of arts (1968–1988) (associate professor since 1973, professor since 1977).

After a long illness, he died in 2003.

== Awards ==
- Salawat Yulayev Award
- Order of Lenin
- Order of the Red Banner of Labour
- Order of the Badge of Honour
- Order of Friendship of Peoples

== Works ==
- Salawat Yulayev
- Shaura (opera)
- Ambassadors of the Urals (opera)
- Kahym-Turya (opera)
- Agidel Waves (opera)
- Kodasa (musical comedy)
- Almakay (musical comedy)
- Singrau torna (The crane song) (ballet)
- About 300 songs and romances
