= Sikasya =

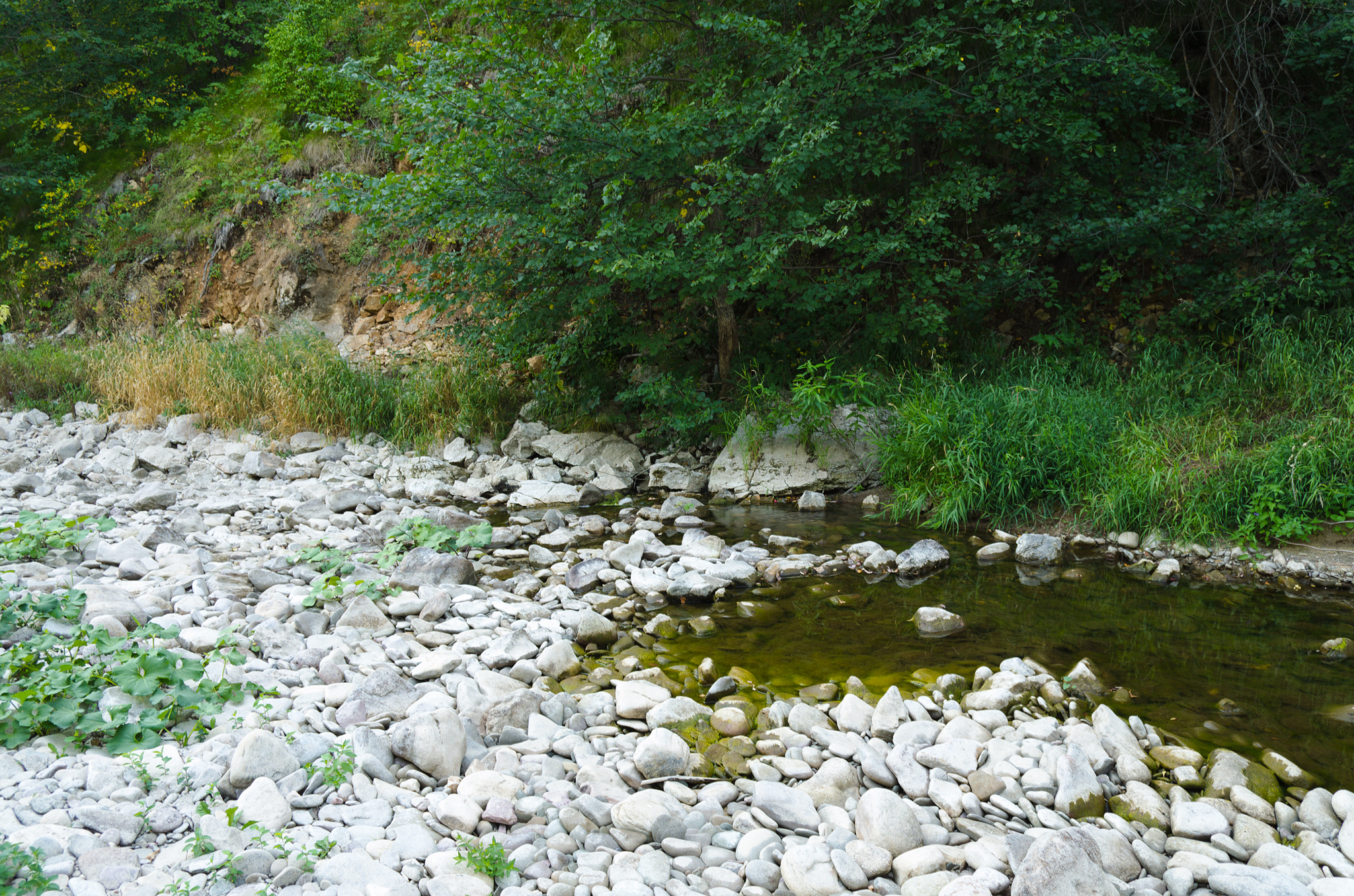
- Native name: Сикася (Russian)

Location
- Country: Russia

Physical characteristics
- Mouth: Zigan
  - coordinates: 53°37′59″N 56°33′20″E
- Length: 46 km (29 mi)
- Basin size: 253 km^{2} (98 sq mi)

Basin features
- Progression: Zigan→ Belaya→ Kama→ Volga→ Caspian Sea

The Sikasya (Bashkir: Һикеяҙ, Hikeyaź; Russian: Сикася́, also: Сиказя́, Сиказа́, Сикия́з) is a river in Ishimbaysky District, a right tributary of the Zigan, in the basin of the Kama. It is 46 kilometres (29 mi) long, and its drainage basin covers 253 square kilometres (98 mi^{2}).
