= Ismagil Gainutdinov =

Ismagil Gainytdinov
- Born: February 10, 1908; Kazan Governorate, Russian Empire
- Died: 1977 (aged 68–69); Moscow
- Education: Kazan State University of Architecture and Engineering (KSUAE), 1927-1931
- Occupation: Architect
- Buildings: Monument to Salavat Yulaev in Ufa, main build of Tatar State Academic Opera and Ballet Theatre named after Musa Jalil in Kazan

Ismagil Gaynutdinov (Russian: Исмагил Галеевич Гайнутдинов, Ismagil Galejevič Gajnutdinov; Tatar: Исмәгыйль Гали улы Гайнетдинов, romanized: İsmäğíl Ğali ulı Ğaynetdinov) was a Soviet architect, educator, and social activist of Tatar ethnicity. He is credited with helping to build Tatar State Academic Opera and Ballet Theatre named after Musa Jalil in Kazan.
