= Zigan =

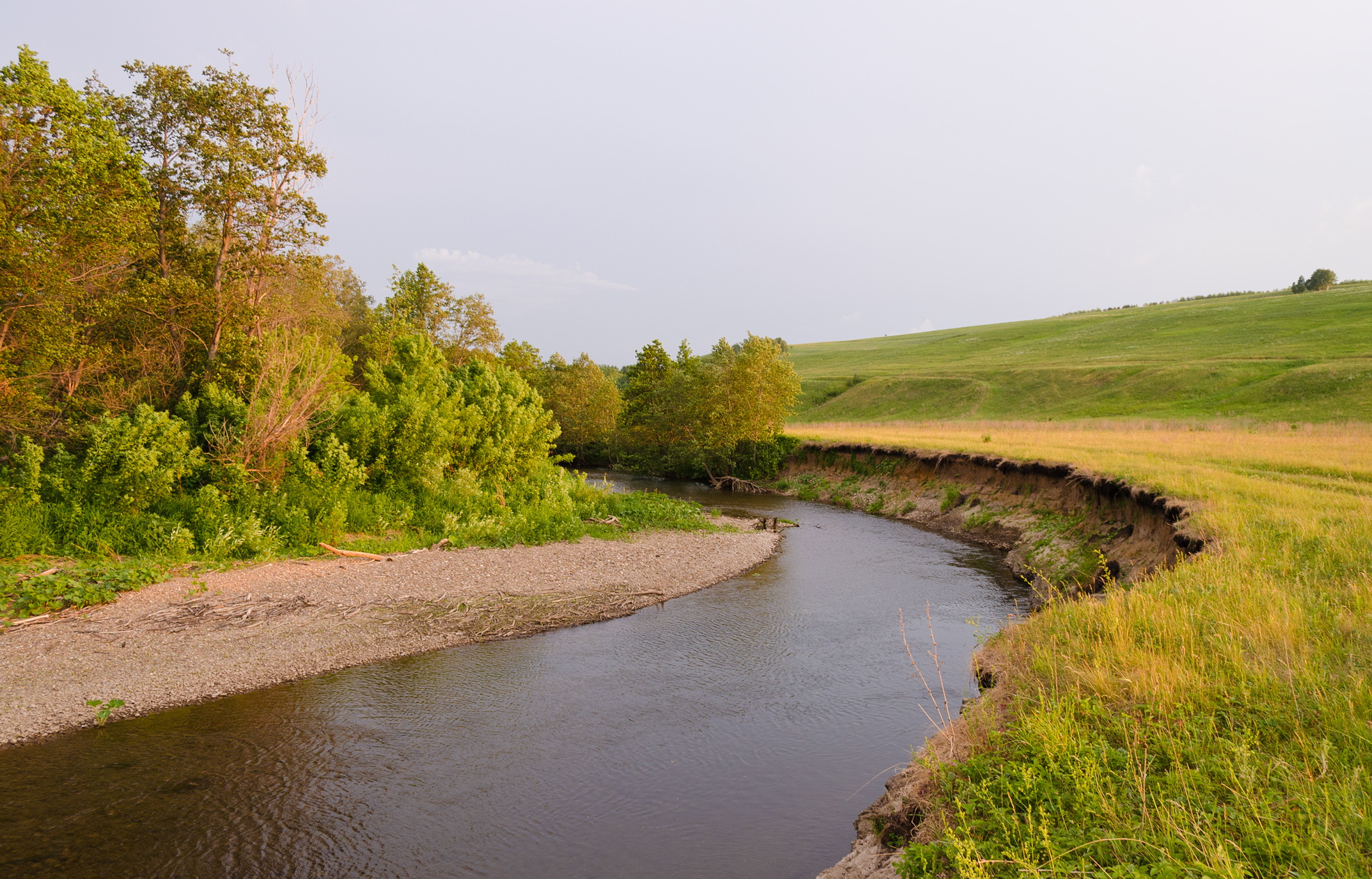
- Native name: Зиган (Russian)

Location
- Country: Russia

Physical characteristics
- Mouth: Belaya
  - coordinates: 53.8431°N 56.223°E
- Length: 98 km (61 mi)
- Basin size: 1,550 km^{2} (600 sq mi)

Basin features
- Progression: Belaya→ Kama→ Volga→ Caspian Sea
- Tributaries
  - left: Kiyauk
  - right: Sikasya

The Zigan (Bashkir: Егән, Yegän; Russian: Зиган), is a river in Bashkortostan, Russia, a right tributary of the Belaya. The river is 98 kilometres (61 mi) long, and the area of its drainage basin is 1,550 square kilometres (600 mi^{2}). The Kiyauk and the Sikasya are tributaries of the Zigan.
