= Sermenevo =

Sermenevo Серменево
- Selo
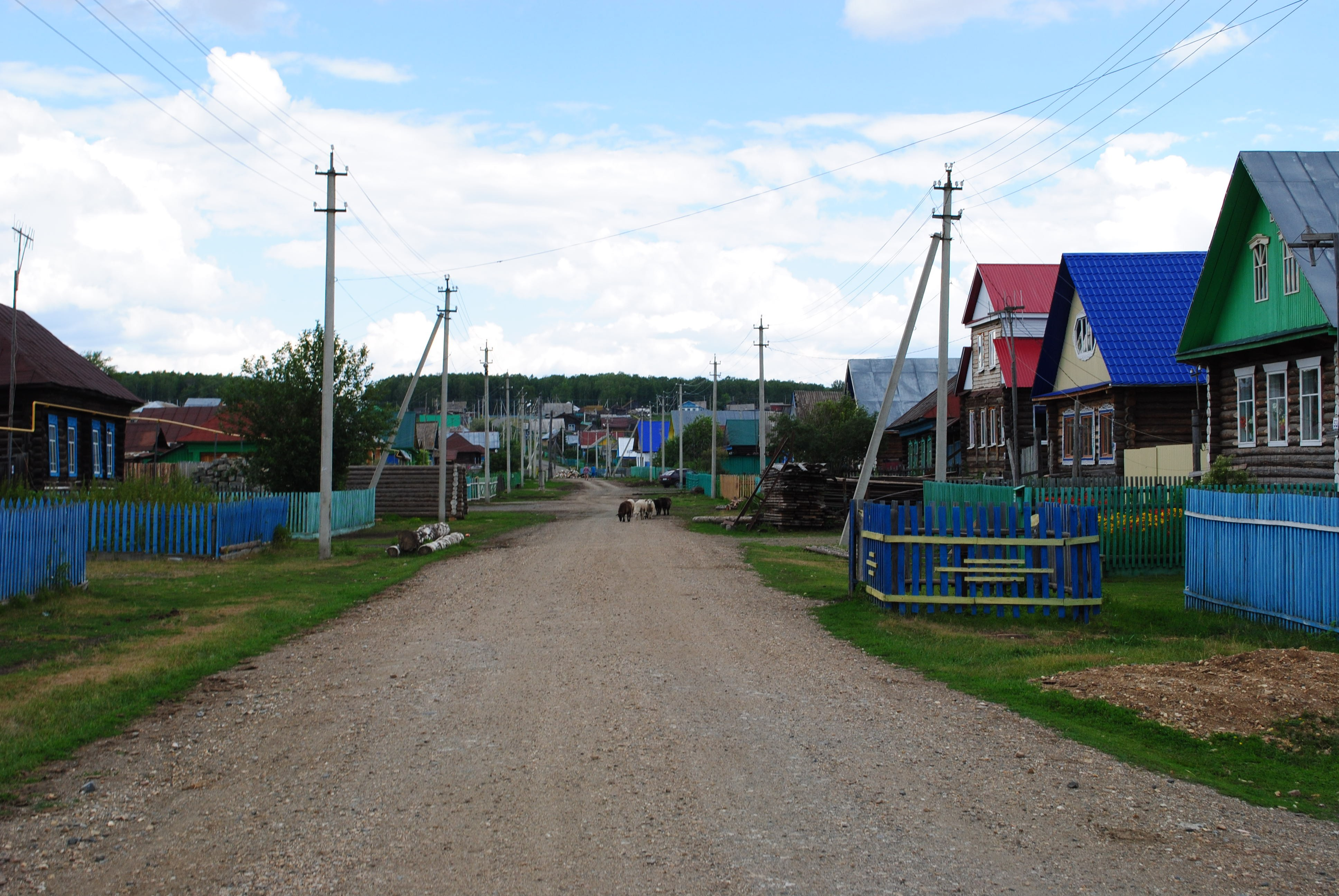
- Sermen village

- Location within Bashkortostan Location within Russia
- Coordinates: 53°52′N 58°05′E
- Country: Russia
- Region: Bashkortostan
- District: Beloretsky District
- Time zone: UTC+5:00

Sermenevo (Russian: Серменево; Bashkir: Сермән, Sermän) is a rural locality (a selo) and the administrative centre of Sermenevsky Selsoviet, Beloretsky District, Bashkortostan, Russia. The population was 2,018 as of 2010. There are 25 streets.

== Geography ==
Sermenevo is located 25 km southwest of Beloretsk (the district's administrative centre) by road. Novobelskoye is the nearest rural locality.
