= Salawat Yulayev =

Bashkir national hero (1756–1800)

Salauat Yulayev
- Салауат Юлай улы
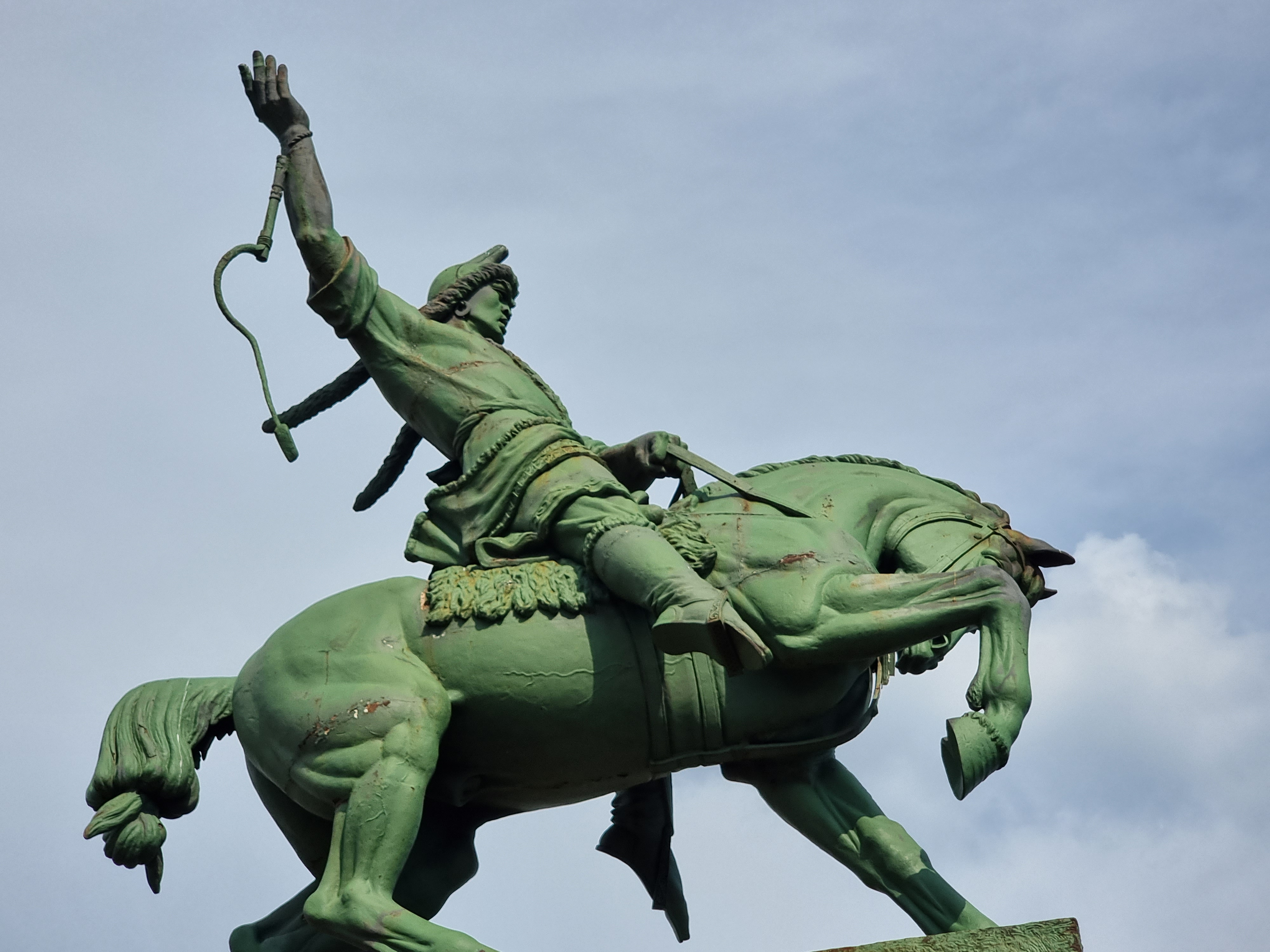
- Monument to Salavat Yulaev

Personal details
- Born: June 1754 Tekeyevo, Shaytan-Kudeyevskaya volost, Siberian Darugha, Ufa Province, Orenburg Governorate, Russian Empire
- Died: 8 October 1800 (aged 46) Baltiyskiy Port, Governorate of Estonia, Russian Empire (now Paldiski, Estonia)
- Parent: Yulay Aznalin (father)
- Profession: Poet and writer

Salawat Yulayulı, Russianized to Salavat Yulayev (Bashkir: Салауат Юлай-улы, romanized: Salawat Yulay-ulı; Russian: Салават Юлаев, romanized: Salavat Yulayev; June 1754 – 8 October 1800) was a Bashkir national hero who helped lead the Pugachev's Rebellion. He was also a poet and singer.

== Biography ==
Salawat Yulayev was born in June 1754 in the village of Tekeyevo, Orenburg Governorate, in the Urals (now Salavatsky District, Bashkortostan). Tekeyevo no longer exists, as it was burned down in 1775. He was born into a religious Muslim Bashkir family of the Shaitan-Kudey lineage, whose members included several generations of mullahs and other religious figures. According to Bashkir oral tradition, Yulayev memorized the entire Quran and was a hafiz.

Salawat Yulayev was at the head of the Bashkortostan uprising from the very beginning of the country war of 1773–1775. The Russian imperial authorities seized him on 24 November 1774, and his father, Yulay Aznalin, was captured even earlier. They were sent to Moscow in chains. Yulay Aznalin was a votchinnik (holder of the patrimonial estate), a rich, intelligent and influential man. He was held in general esteem among Bashkirs and was a Bauermeister (district foreman). The local authorities gave credence to him; his fidelity to the Imperial Russian government could not be doubted.

In 1768 the Orenburg governor prince Putyatin himself appointed Yulay as the foreman of the Bashkir command. But soon the merchant Tverdyshev was granted collegiate assessor rank and deprived Yulay Aznalin of his land to build Simsky plant and villages. The Bashkir land was falling to ruin, and so Yulay Aznalin and his nineteen-year-old son Salawat stood up under Yemelyan Pugachev’s banners.

Ten months after Salawat's capture, in September 1775, he and his father were publicly lashed in those places where the largest battles with the Russian governmental armies took place. In that month they were both dragged by their nostrils, and their foreheads and faces were branded. On 2 October 1775, their hands and legs chained, Salawat and Yulay were sent on two carts under "protection" to the Baltic fortress Rogervik (nowadays the city of Paldiski in Estonia) for life. The transport with convicts passed Menzelinsk, Kazan, Nizhni Novgorod, Moscow, reaching Tver on 14 November and then continuing on through Novgorod, Pskov, and Revel and arriving finally in Rogervik on 29 November.

The Baltic port Rogervik had been founded by Peter the Great. However, when participants of the Bashkir uprising arrived in Rogervik, the fortress was practically deserted. There was only a small garrison and a small number of prisoners. Here Salawat and Yulay met their brothers-in-arms in struggle: Pugachev Colonel I.S. Aristov, Colonel Kanzafar Usaev, and others. Salawat Yulayev and his father lived the rest of their lives in Rogervik.

When Paul I ascended the throne, the commandant of the fortress Langel submitted an inquiry about moving the remaining participants of the Pugachev Uprising to Taganrog or to Irkutsk to a cloth factory. The resolution came from the Senate: The aforementioned convicts are subject to be moved… For their villainies they are banished by imperial command, and it is ordered to keep them in this port with possible caution that they could not run away." There was a special manifest on 17 March 1775 which was published by the late empress Catherine II. By her order all participants of the Pugachev revolt were to be imprisoned forever, and their names should "be condemned to eternal oblivion and deep silence." Under this manifest, local authorities pursued everyone who pronounced the names of the freedom fighter rebels against Russian overlordship.

Salawat was literate. He wrote in Old Tatar, which used to be a common written language for Turkic peoples in the Volga-Ural region. Documents signed by him have been preserved.

People of different nationalities could be found in Salawat's army. Despite the ban on mentioning Salawat, the peoples of the region passed on word-of-mouth legends and songs about him.

== Family ==
By order of Catherine II it was forbidden even to mention the rebellion and its participants. Therefore, there is little documented information about them.

The father of Salavat-Yulai Aznalin (Adnalin, Aznalikhin) was the leader (starshina) of the Bashkir Shaitan-Kudey yurt (volost, district). For loyal service and courage, Yulay Aznalin was awarded a silver sign in 1772.

Bashkirs became part of Russia in the 16th century. By agreement with the tsarist government, the Bashkirs retained their lands. But they had to perform military service: they guarded the eastern borders of the Russian Empire, participated in the wars waged by Russia.

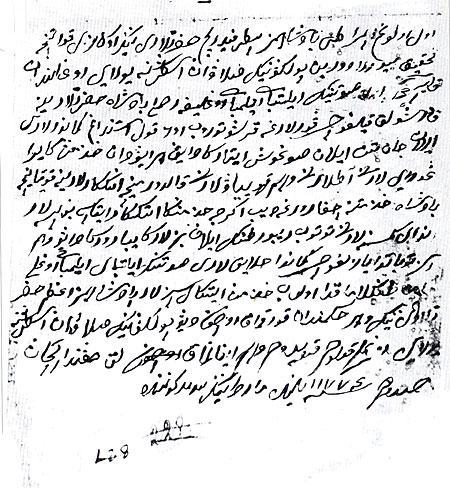
The order of Salavat Yulaev to the centurion Ilyatbai Ilimbaev on the recruitment of residents to the detachment on 23 March 1774

Sometimes the contract was violated, part of the land was taken away, and the Bashkirs demanded restoration of justice, even raised uprisings. Bashkir uprisings took place especially often in the 18th century, as there were more frequent cases of violation of Bashkir rights, the seizure of their land for the construction of factories and for transfer to the nobles.

Several years lasted Yulaya's lawsuit with the breeders Ya.B. Tverdyshev and I.S. Myasnikov, who illegally seized vast lands for the Simsky plant. The tsarist administration favored breeders. Yulai was fined 600 rubles (1 horse cost 10 rubles).

Researchers believe that Yulai had 3 wives. The documents do not indicate the name of the mother of Salavat. Her name is Aznabika in folklore sources. They say that she was an educated woman and had a great influence on her son. After the teacher Nabi Kabiri, it was the mother who continued to educate her son.

Russian folklore speaks of the older brothers of Salavat named Suleiman and Rakai. From the poetic works of Salavat and folklore sources, it was possible to find out that the hero had three wives. The eldest wife was the widow of a deceased elder brother, she already had children from her first marriage. He married her according to the ancient custom of the Bashkirs (Levirate). The letter of Salavat, written by him in the cell of the Ufa Magistrate on 7 May 1775, refers to one wife and two children. They were in the hands of the commandant of the city S. Myasoedov and General Freyman. Salavat asks his supporters to help them go free.

== Legends, traditions, songs ==
Legends and traditions peculiarly perpetuate the memory of their ancestors. Epic narrations about the events and people of a long past are called by Bashkirs riweyet, hikeyet, tarikh. Most of the legends are local. But the legends about the historical hero, poet and warrior Salwvat Yulaev survived in different areas (over 200 are recorded).

Structurally, the legends about Salawat Yulayev are diverse. Small stories have a purely informative function ("Mother of Salawat", "Death of Salawat's Family", "Dream of Salawat", "Salawat Bridge").

On the whole, among the legends, plot narratives (фабулаты) occupy a significant place. Depending on their vital content, they can be single-episode (for example, "Salawat and Karasakal", "Order of Salavat", "Salavat in our village"), or consist of several episodes (e.g., "Salawat and Baltas", "The Legend of Salawat- batyr "). There are texts where a song wedges in prose. In most cases, these are songs of Salawat himself. Thus the storytellers apparently wanted to emphasize the poetic giftedness of their hero.

Most of the legends are dedicated to the glorification of Salawat Yulayev, a description of his personal qualities. For example, the legend that Salawat killed a bear at the age of 12 (15 or 16) is still popular (bears still live in Bashkortostan). The people say that Salawat had ten qualities of a real hero ("Salawat", "Power of Salawat"). At a traditional folk festival (sabantuy), the very young Salawat wins martial arts, horse racing, running and others ("How Salawat was recognized as a batyr on Square").

In regional folklore, Salawat Yulayev is credited with distinct leadership qualities during the uprising between 1773 and 1775. Traditional legends, such as "Salawat Headquarters," "Salawat Scout," and "Salawat Yulayev on Mount Imyantau," depict him as a tactful and courageous military leader. Historians generally attribute the ultimate defeat of the rebel army to the numerical superiority of the government forces.

The legends about the capture of Salawat and his exile to Estonia in the Baltic forever ( for hard labor) are filled with deep pain of the people ("Why there are a lot of crystal in the mountains"). In the mountains of Bashkortostan there is a lot of crystal because they cried alone, with families and a whole village.

But there are legends expressing hope for the return of Salawat. Sometimes Salawat comes to special saints (aulia) and warns them of something. To see Salawat in a dream- fortunately ("Salawat Form"). In different areas, toponymic legends have been preserved as the memory of the people ("Salawat places", "Cave of Salawat", "Bridge of Salawat", "Camp of Salawat", etc.)

Among the legends there are many stories about the Salawat family, about his relatives ("Salawat's father", "Mother of Salawat", "Wives of Salawat", "The capture of Salawat", "Marriage of Salawat to a Russian girl", etc.).

Folk stories about Salawat and his father Yulai brought to us the thoughts and views of people of the era of the uprising of 1773–1775 and subsequent times. Different peoples of the region have developed an understanding of the just nature of the demands of the rebels. The joint struggle contributed to strengthening the friendship of the peoples of the region. Even in distant Estonia (the place of the hero's hard labor), legends about Salawat are preserved.

During a long oral existence, some traditions lost some concrete realities and were supplemented by fictional motives. For example, "Salawat-batyr" about the battle of Salawat with the "king" Kirmasakal («Kirma-sakal»-bearded).

Several works on Salawat related to the epic genre (Bashk. Ҡobayyr) have been published. "Salawat-batyr", "Yulai and Salawat" give an idea of the hero commander himself and the reasons for the uprising. The epic "Baik Aidar-sesen" tells about the previous uprisings of the Bashkirs, the atrocities of Murza A. Tevkelev against the Bashkirs. These stories had an important influence on the formation of the character of Salawat.

The defeat of the uprising, the executions of leaders served as material for the creation of ballads- beyetes ( "Song of Salawat", "Unforgettable Salawat", "Salawat Yulay"). They reflect the people's love for their hero, longing for him, willingness to continue his struggle.

A large number of songs about Salawat have been preserved. The people and Salawat are inseparable- one of the main ideas of Bashkir songs. They are informatively rich, they mention battles, places of battles, the names of leaders of the uprising. These songs are grouped by Bashkir scholar Anur Vakhitov on three topics: “Salawat”, “Salawat-batyr”, “Salawat in penal servitude”.

An old Russian song about Salawat was preserved in the Volga region ("Oh, you, goy, good fellow, Young Bashkir Salavatushka!"). The first collectors of Bashkir folklore about Salavat were Russian explorers of the region F.D.Nefedov, R.G. Ignatiev, D.N. Mamin-Sibiryak, M.V. Lossievsky (in the 19th century).

== Salawat's poems and songs ==
About 500 lines from the poetic heritage of Salawat Yulaev have been preserved to our days, either in writing or orally.

Salawat as a poet is also mentioned in traditions. In the village of Alka, Salavat district, a modern researcher Miras Idelbaev wrote down a text about the poet's written oeuvre: « My father says that Salawat always composed songs, bayits and, wrote them to paper and ... left them to people. He left them everywhere he went... He left them us as he drove past our Lake Yaltarakkul ....» (М.Идельбаев. Мужи, седлайте аргамаков... )

Poems by Salawat Yulaev

Round the Ai river I went
And all my summer here I spent.
When the enemy here came
Like sheep it would run away
( legend: Salawat`s Stay at the Aj Riverside)
Translated by Akhmatyanova N.N., Ganeev B.T.
**
Breave yegets in their hands
Had a bow and arrows.
If they went to the fight at once
The enemy would run away in horror.

The banks of the Koethkaende are woody
No sparrow will fly up to my whistle.
When you have few friends left,
There `s no way out of the thistle.
(legend: Baedherghol- batyr`s Death)

(Koethkaende- the Salawat`s native river)
Translated by Akhmatyanova N.N.

In the XVIII century, the oral literature of the Bashkirs existed in parallel with the written. Accordingly, Salavat's poems were created in two ways: he improvised (like Sėsėn), or he wrote on paper.

4 January 1774 The Military Collegium adopted a special decision on the destruction of documents of the rebels.

During the fighting, the archives of the field offices of the most prominent military leaders of the Peasant War, including Salawat, were lost. However, several manuscripts of the hero poet and sufficiently rich information about him still survived in the archives..

The historian Abubakir Usmanov wrote: “For official characteristics, we do not see the living Salavat, lyric poet, warrior poet. The image of the living Salavat was preserved in the memory of the people, the Sesens carefully preserved the songs and poems of the poet” (А. Усманов. Поэт-воин. – Красная Башкирия. – 1948. -15 августа).

For the first time, Salawat was called a poet by a researcher of the region R. G. Ignatiev, who studied archival documents. In studies of the 50-70s ( XX century) only seven verses of Salawat Yulaev published by R. Ignatiev were mentioned.

«In the second half of the 19th century, manuscripts of verses by Salawat were stored in the (state) archive or in the archive of any particular person, and they passed through at least 4 people (Ignatiev, Nefedov and their translators). This means that these poems were stored in accessible places for scientists»,- written by A. Usmanov in 1968 (А.Усманов. Некоторые сведения о биографии Салавата Юлаева. – Совет Башкортостаны. -1968. – 22 мая).

Salavat's fiery speeches and poems did not leave people indifferent; they inspired them to fight. “According to the Bashkirs of Verkhneuralskiy, the songs of Salavat himself,” wrote the local historian R. Ignatiev, “always ignited the courage of his soldiers ... Salavat's songs, like improvisation, remained unknown” (Manuscript of the collection of R. Ignatiev «Сказания, сказки и песни, сохранившиеся в рукописях татарской письменности и в устных пересказах у инородцев-магометан Оренбургского края», опубликованного в «Записках Оренбургского отдела ИРГО». – ГАОО. -Ф.163.-Оп.1. -Д. 22.-Л. 29).

The poet P. M. Kudryashov, in his letter to P. P. Svinyin (publisher of the journal "Domestic Notes"), writes about the three verses of Salawat that he found and translated into Russian.

Separate pages of the manuscript of the researcher F. D. Nefedov “Salavat, Bashkir Batyr” are stored in the state archive (ЦГАЛИ Ф. 342. – оп. 2. – д. 73). This essay was published in 1880 in the journal Russian Wealth. In it, the author cited the contents of the five poems of Salawat. Four of them coincide with the publications of R. Ignatiev. The translation was made in prose very carefully, while maintaining the meaning of each word.

Researchers compared the literal translations of the verses and songs of Salawat discovered by Russian researchers in the 19th century with the lyrics and songs of Salawat preserved among the Bashkirs. The coincidence of the texts turned out to be complete, folk memory preserved the poetry of Salavat.

The archive of the Ufa branch of the RAS contains several works of the hero poet, recorded by M. Burangulov (Ф. 3.- оп. 12.- д. 445.- лл. 194–205 – на башк. яз.).

Among them are “Salawat's Song dedicated to the beloved girl Zuelaeykha”, “Salawat's Song dedicated to the Urals”, “Salawat's Song after being wounded”. They were provided by M. Burangulov in the 1920s by Gabit-sesen.

Salawat's poems published in the 19th century:

- Filipp Nefyodov in the essay "Salavat, Bashkir Batyr" (1880), 5 verses in Russian.
- Ruf Ignatyev in the work "The movement of the Bashkirs before the Pugachev riot; Bashkir Salavat Yulaev, Pugachev foreman, singer and improviser" (1893) 7 verses.

In the Russian Empire, poems by Salawat Yulaev were printed four times.

== Death ==
The last documented mention of Salawat Yulayev is dated 1800. Till this time he stayed in bondage for twenty five years: "To Estland provincial board from Major Ditmar being at the Baltic invalid command. Being under my responsibility, convicted slaves 12 men which are in a safe state. Against the previously submitted register decreased: This month of 26-th date, convicted slave Salawat Yulayev died about which I have the honor of reporting." Salawat died in penal servitude on 26 September 1800 (8 October Gregorian Calendar).

== Legacy ==
"You are so far, my fatherland!
I would return home, but alas,
I am in chains, my Bashkirs!
The road home may be obscured by snow,
But come spring it shall melt –
I'm not dead, my Bashkirs!"

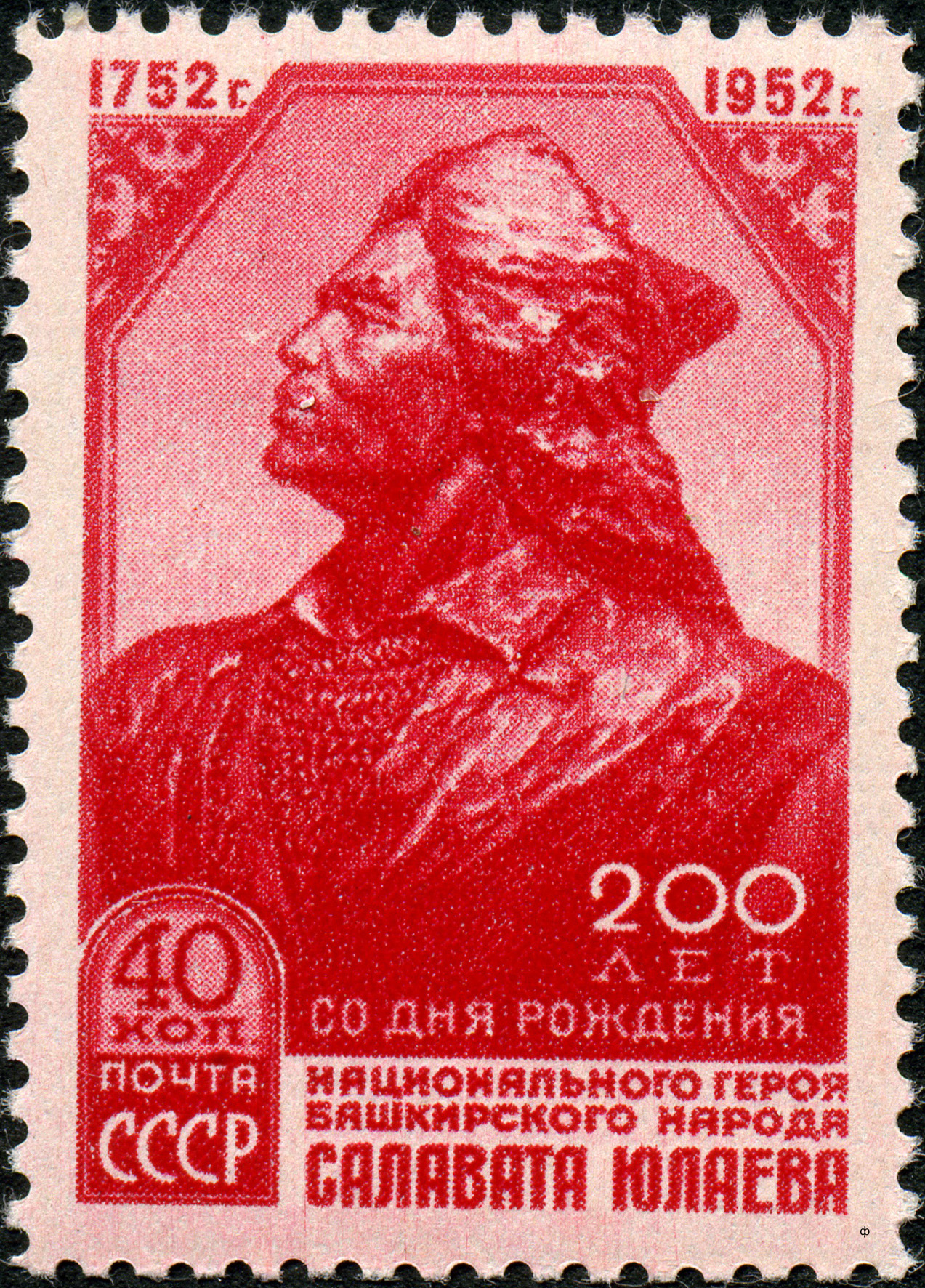
Salawat on a 1952 stamp

These words, attributed to Salawat Yulayev, are perceived today as a confession of the strong batyr, who, exhausted by torture and interrogations, did not resign himself to his destiny. Regretfully, only a small number of documents remain about his life and fate, and the poetic works of Salawat, who personified heroism and poetic talent of the Bashkir people.

Many places in modern-day Bashkortostan are named after Yulayev, including a town, a cave, a hockey team, and the republic's State Prize.

In 1940 a biographical film titled Salavat Yulayev was made in the Soviet Union by director Yakov Protazanov. In 1954 composer Zagir Ismagilov and poet Bayezit Bikbay created the opera Salawat Yulayev.

- the order of Salawat Yulayev of the Republic of Bashkortostan was established on 1 June 1998 (Постановление Государственного Собрания РБ от 1 июня 1998 года № ГС-400 «Об утверждении статута ордена Салавата Юлаева»)
- In 1954, the composers Husain Akhmetov and Nariman Sabitov ballet "Mountain Eagle". Its premiere took place in 1959 at the Bashkir State Opera and Ballet Theater, in which Rudolf Nureyev danced in 1953–1955.
- In 1919–1920, the political department of the Bashkir separate cavalry division published the newspaper « Salawat» .
- During the Great Patriotic War (1941–1945) were named «Salawat Yulayev» : fighter anti-tank artillery regiment, armored train and other units.
- The image of Salawat Yulayev is immortalized in Bashkir and Russian folk art, in the works of Russian, Bashkir, Tatar, Kazakh, Chuvash, Udmurt and Mari writers.
- Salawat Yulayev's days are celebrated annually in the Republic of Bashkortostan and neighboring regions.
- The republican folk festival "Salawat yeyeny" is held annually.
- A double-deck motor ship is named "Salawat Yulayev".
- The museum of Salawat Yulayev in the village of Maloyaz (Salavat district of Bashkortostan) stores a copy of the saber of Salawat Yulayev.

This saber without a scabbard, length 96 cm, width 3 cm, concave. Yellow copper pen with the image of a lion's head and jewelry made of small stones. On the blade is a slightly extinct inscription in Arabic, which scientists could not decipher.

- In the National Museum of the Republic of Bashkortostan, visitors can see the saber of the Bashkir national hero Salawat Yulayev.
- In many cities and towns there are streets named after Salavat Yulaev.
- In 1967, the largest equestrian monument in Europe was erected for Salawat Yulayev in the Bashkir capital of Ufa.

=== Biographers of Salawat ===
The biography of Salawat Yulayev was studied by historians, local historians, writers and journalists like Inga Gvozdikova, Victor Sidorov, Radik Vakhitov, Miras Idelbaev, Khairulla Kulmukhametov, Ihsan Zalyaletdinov, Tarhan Zagidullin, Wilmir Safin, Abuzar Saifullin, Stepan Zlobin. Salavat Yulaev is mentioned in the “History of Pugachev” by A. S. Pushkin.

Inga Gvozdikova is a historian who collected and studied documents from the Peasant War of 1773–1775 (from the late 1950s). She wrote the first scientific, strictly documented biography of the Bashkir national hero Salawat Yulayev.

The image of Salavat is carefully preserved in the memory of the people. From ancient times, the Bashkirs valued the love of their motherland (the symbol is a readiness to serve their people), freedom (its symbol is a special love for the horse), and poetry. A warrior, poet, and singer, Salawat Yulaev embodied all these qualities.

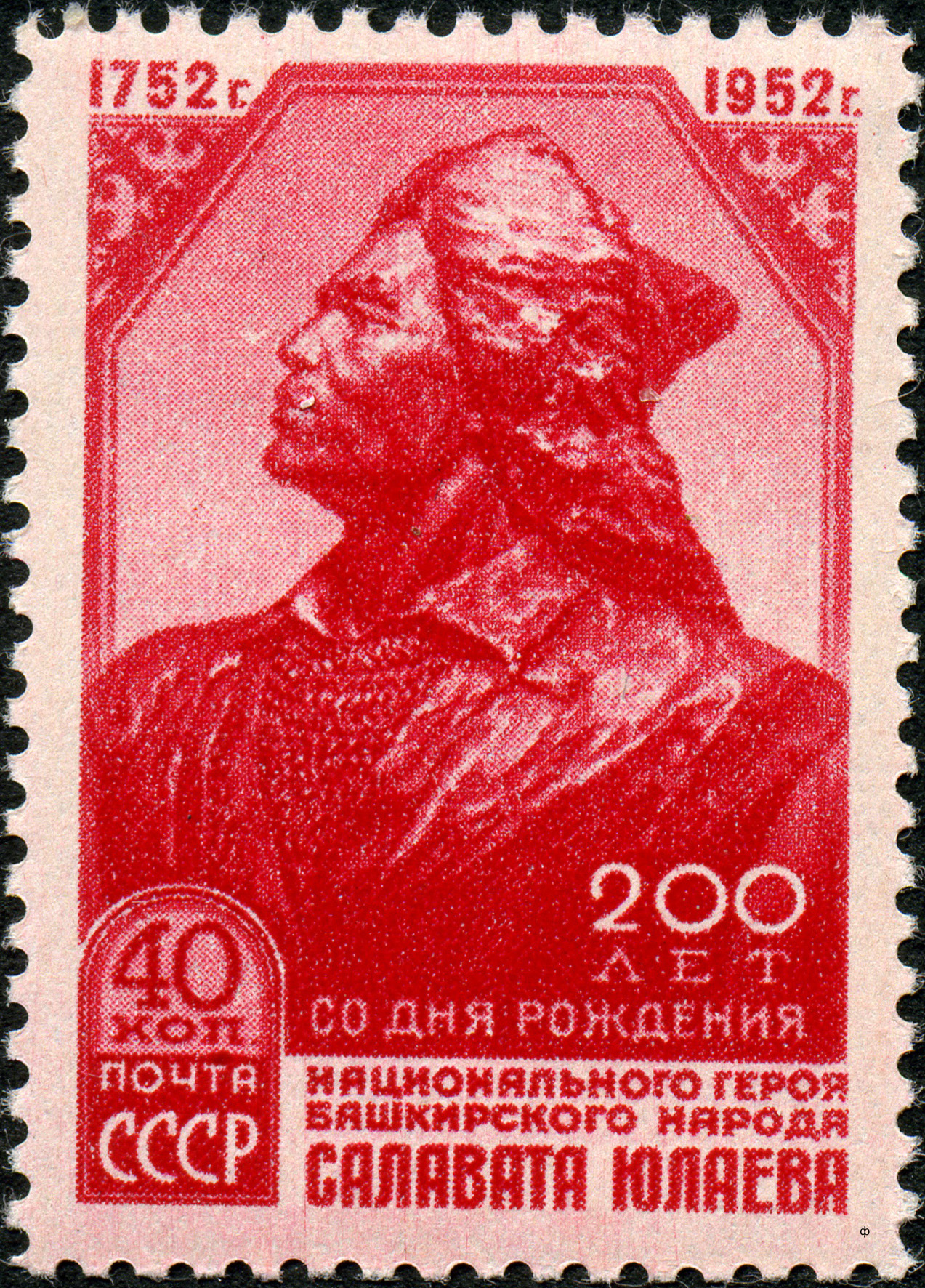
Postage stamps of the USSR

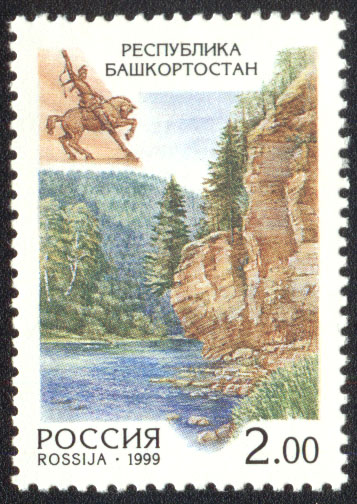
Postage stamps of Russia

Salavat on the coat of arms of Bashkortostan

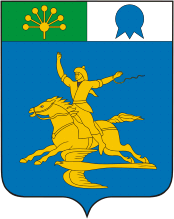
Coat of arms of the city of Salavat

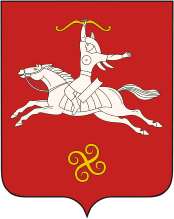
Coat of arms of Salavatsky District Russia

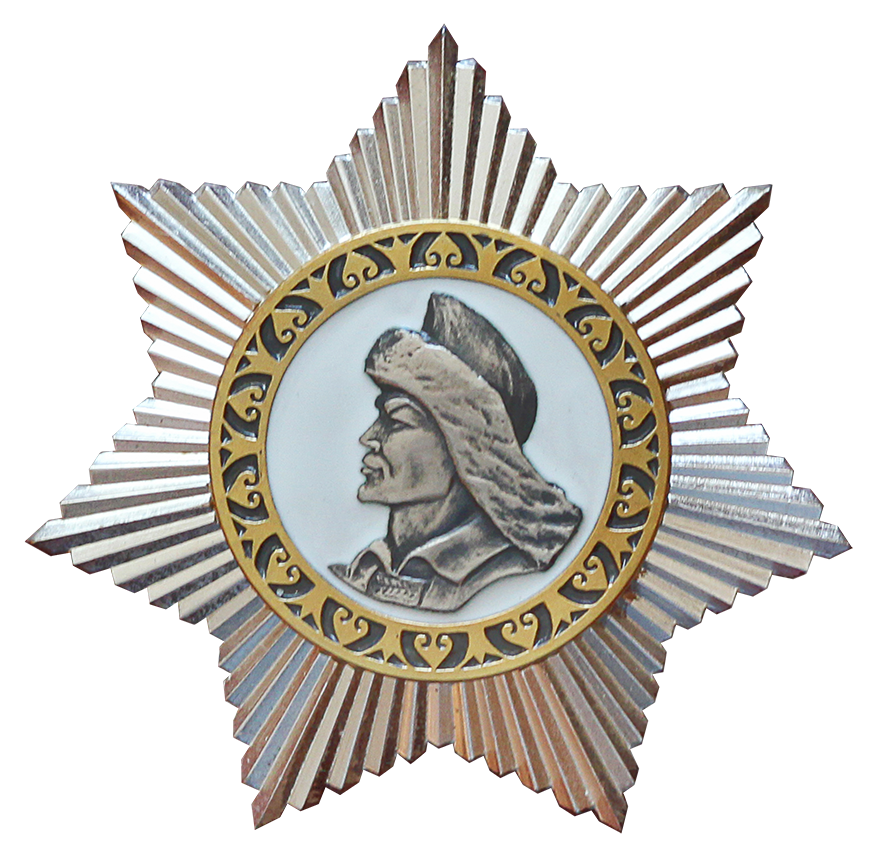
Order of Salavat Yulaev

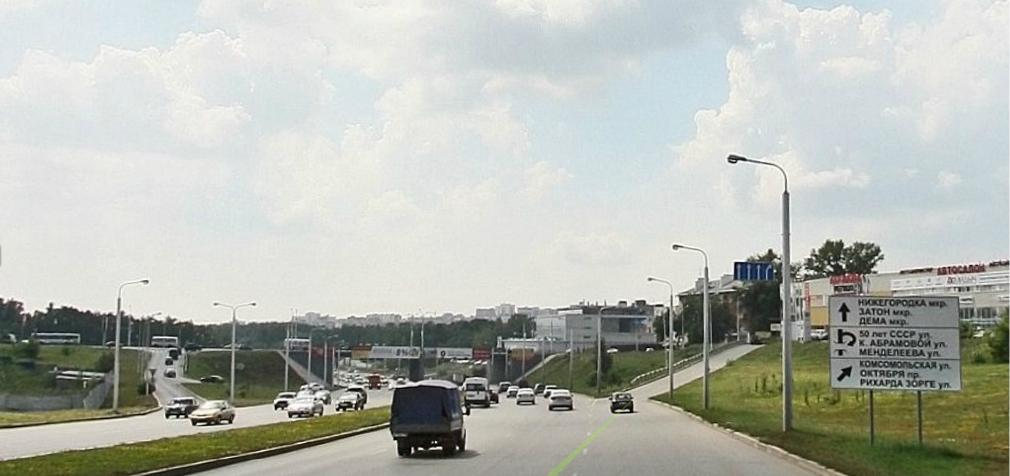
Salavat Yulaev Avenue in Ufa

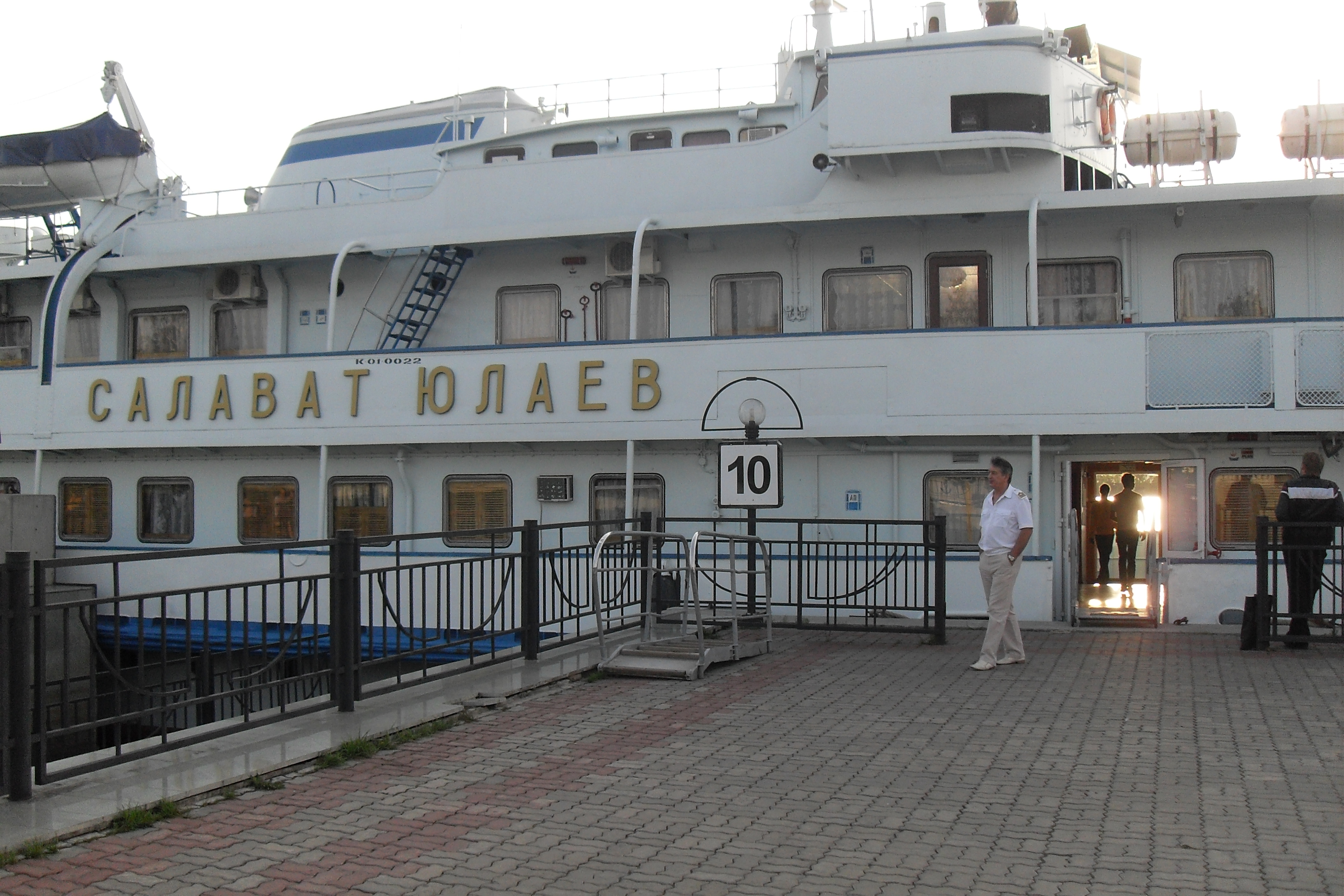
Motor ship "Salavat Yulaev"

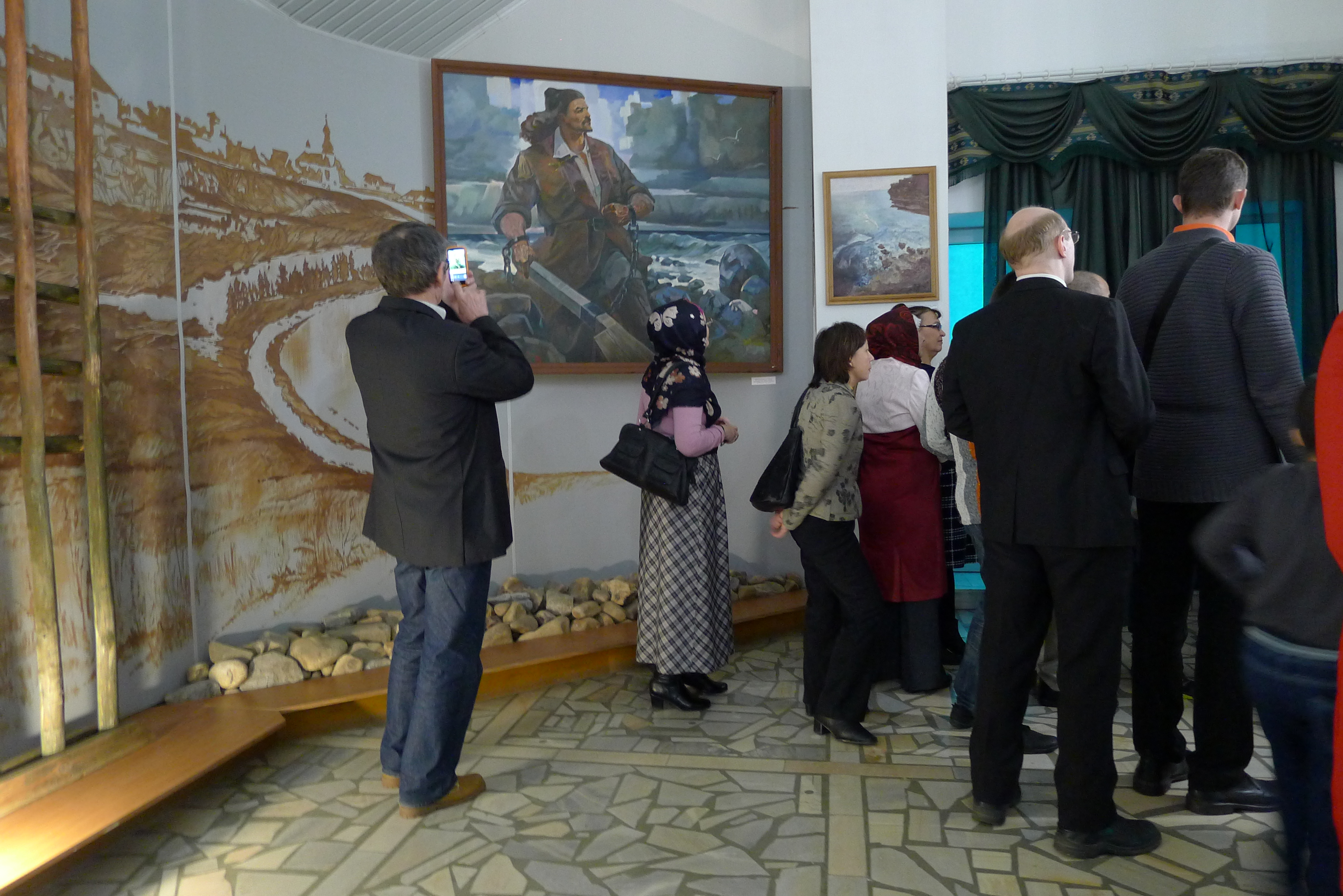
Museum of Salavat Yulaev

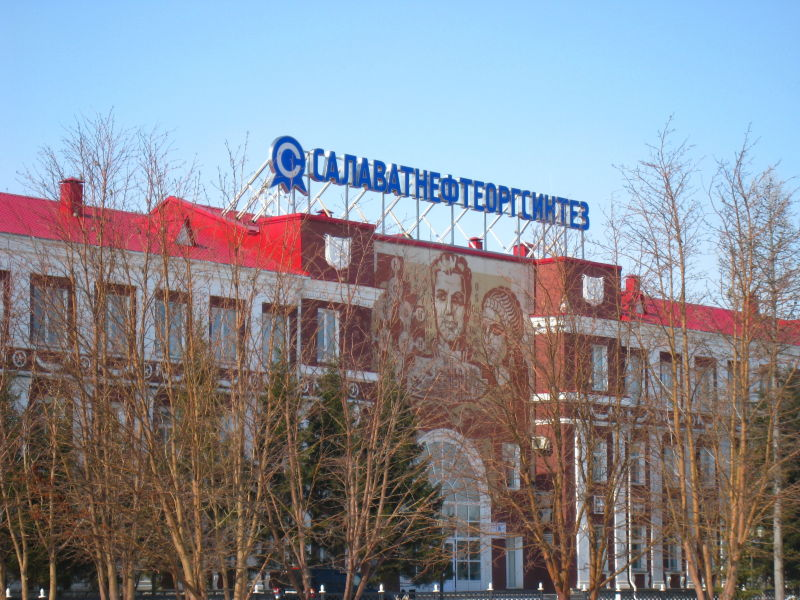
Gazprom Neftekhim Salavat

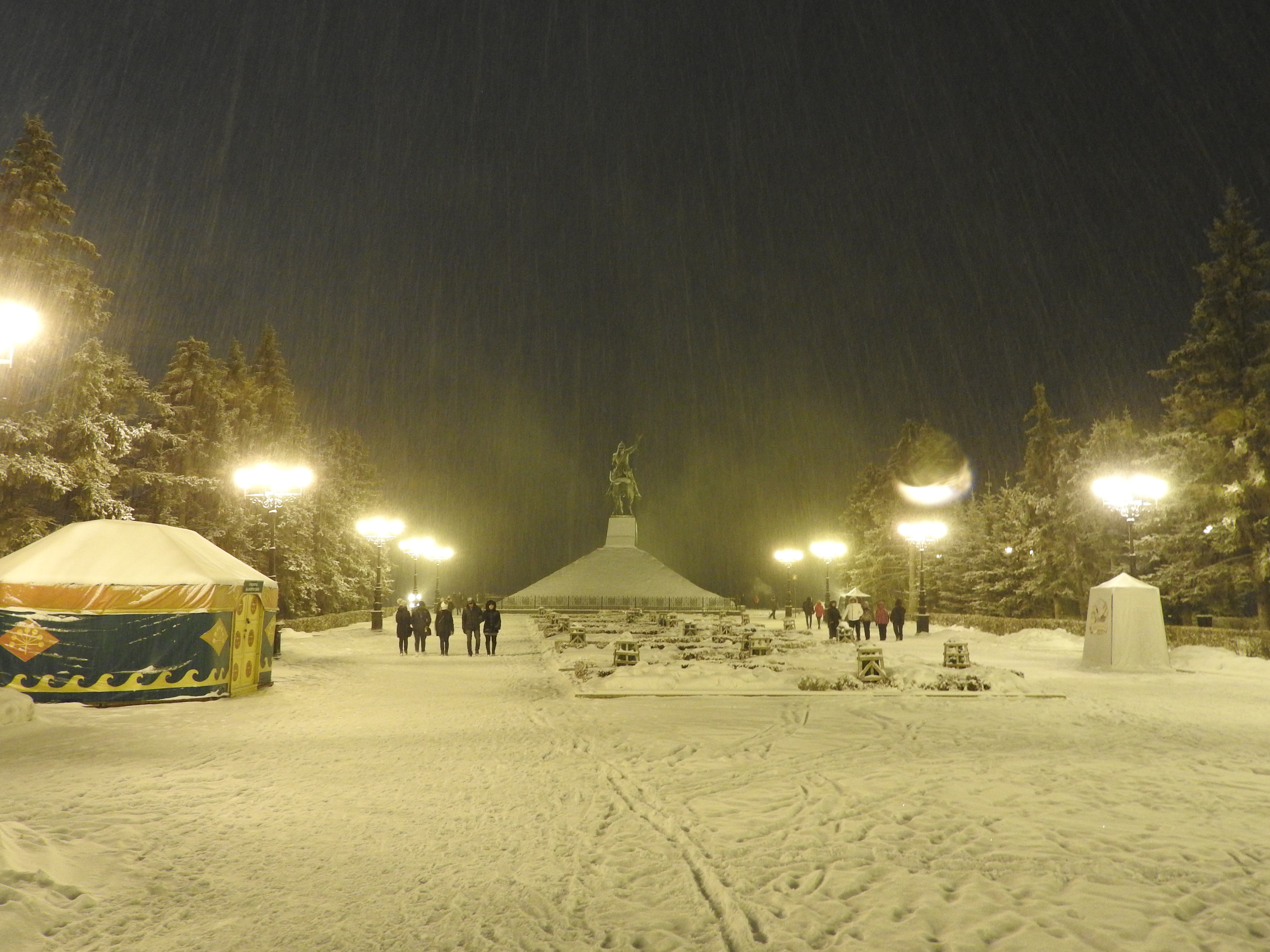
Salavat Yulaev Square in Ufa

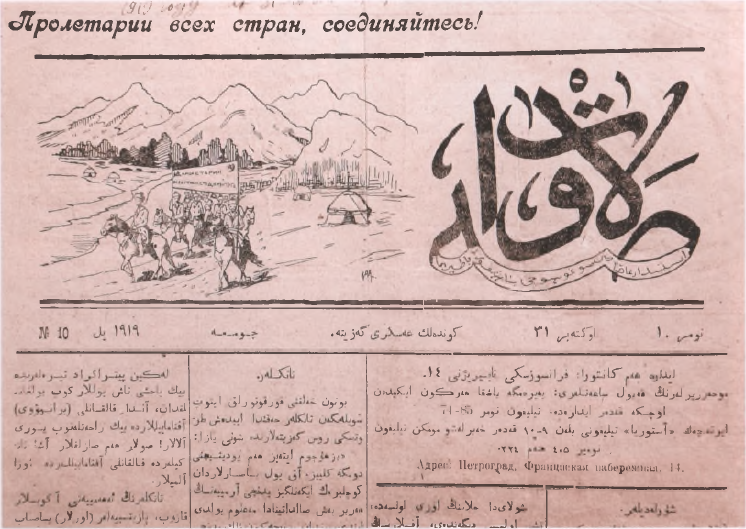
Newspaper "Salavat Yulaev"

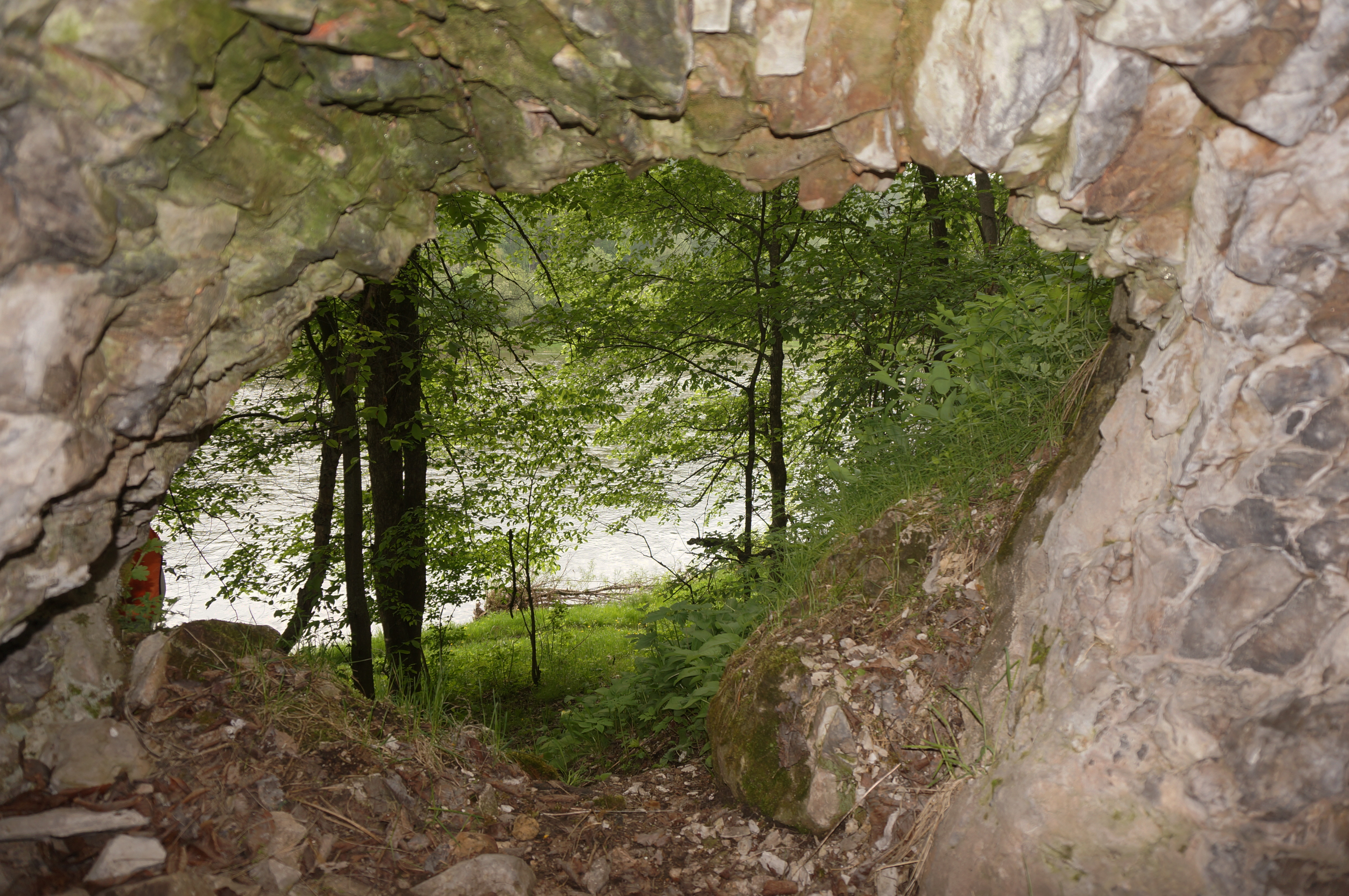
Cave "Salavat Yulaev"

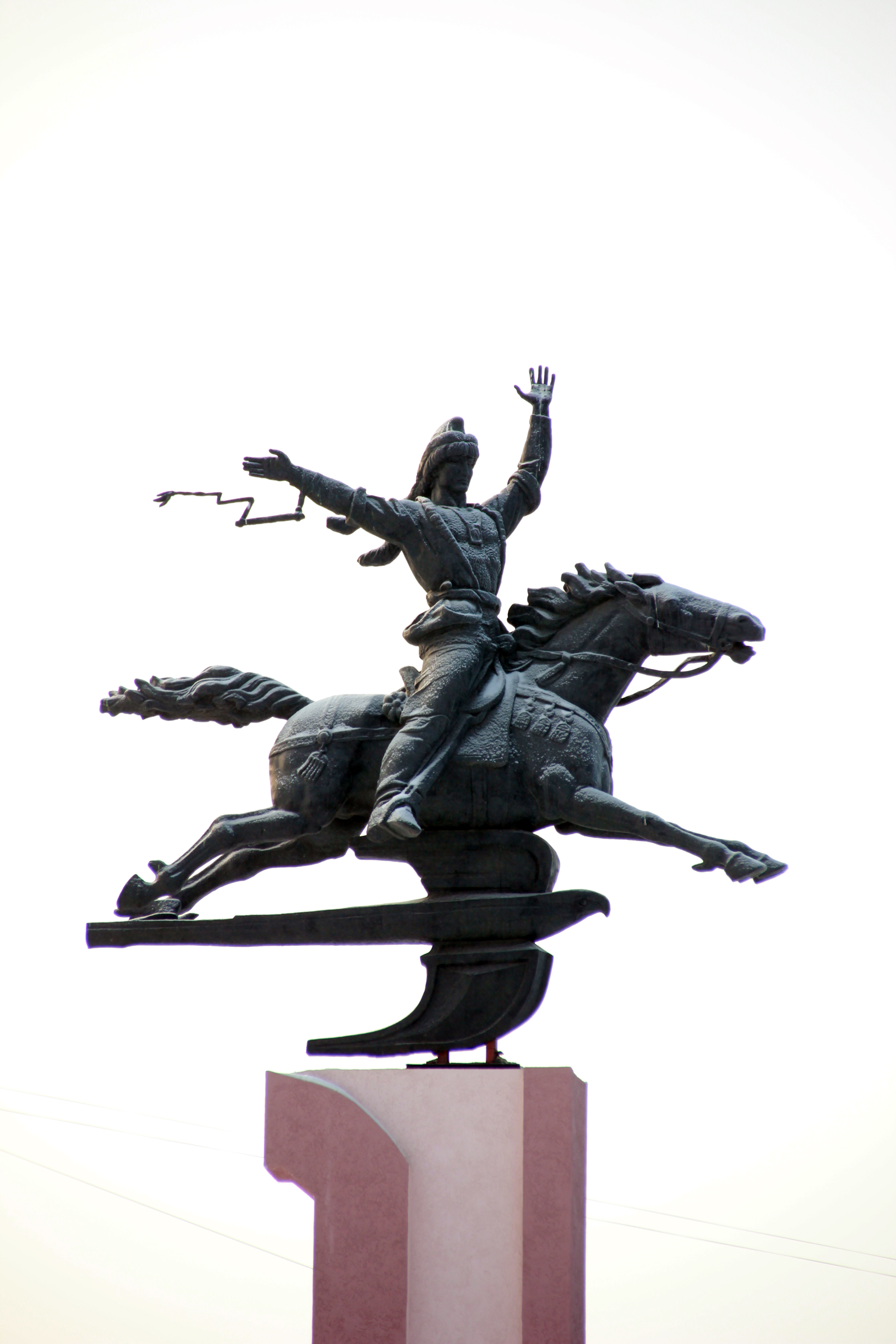
Monument in the city of Salavat

== See also ==
- Bashkir rebellions

== Links ==
- https://culture.bashkortostan.ru/about/suborg/693/
- https://old.hcsalavat.ru › history › kto-takoy-salavat-yulaev
