= Bakeyevo =

Bakeyevo (Russian: Бакеево) is the name of several rural localities in Russia:

- Bakeyevo, Beloretsky District, Republic of Bashkortostan, a selo in Zigazinsky Selsoviet of Beloretsky District of the Republic of Bashkortostan
- Bakeyevo, Sterlibashevsky District, Republic of Bashkortostan, a selo in Bakeyevsky Selsoviet of Sterlibashevsky District of the Republic of Bashkortostan
- Bakeyevo, Moscow Oblast, a village under the administrative jurisdiction of the work settlement of Andreyevka in Solnechnogorsky District of Moscow Oblast
