= Otnurok (village) =

Otnurok Отнурок
- Village
- Location within Bashkortostan Location within Russia
- Coordinates: 54°03′N 58°19′E
- Country: Russia
- Region: Bashkortostan
- District: Beloretsky District
- Time zone: UTC+5:00

Otnurok (Russian: Отнурок; Bashkir: Отнурок) is a rural locality (a village) in Nursky Selsoviet, Beloretsky District, Bashkortostan, Russia. The population was 5 as of 2010. There are 11 streets.

== Geography ==
Otnurok is located 17 km northwest of Beloretsk (the district's administrative centre) by road. Otnurok (selo) is the nearest rural locality.
