= Novokhasanovo =

Novokhasanovo Новохасаново
- Selo
- Location within Bashkortostan Location within Russia
- Coordinates: 54°14′N 57°34′E
- Country: Russia
- Region: Bashkortostan
- District: Beloretsky District
- Time zone: UTC+5:00

Novokhasanovo (Russian: Новохасаново; Bashkir: Яңы Хәсән, Yañı Xäsän) is a rural locality (a selo) in Inzersky Selsoviet, Beloretsky District, Bashkortostan, Russia. The population was 177 as of 2010. There are 3 streets.

== Geography ==
Novokhasanovo is located 94 km northwest of Beloretsk (the district's administrative centre) by road. Inzer is the nearest rural locality.
