= Utkalevo =

Utkalevo Уткалево
- Selo
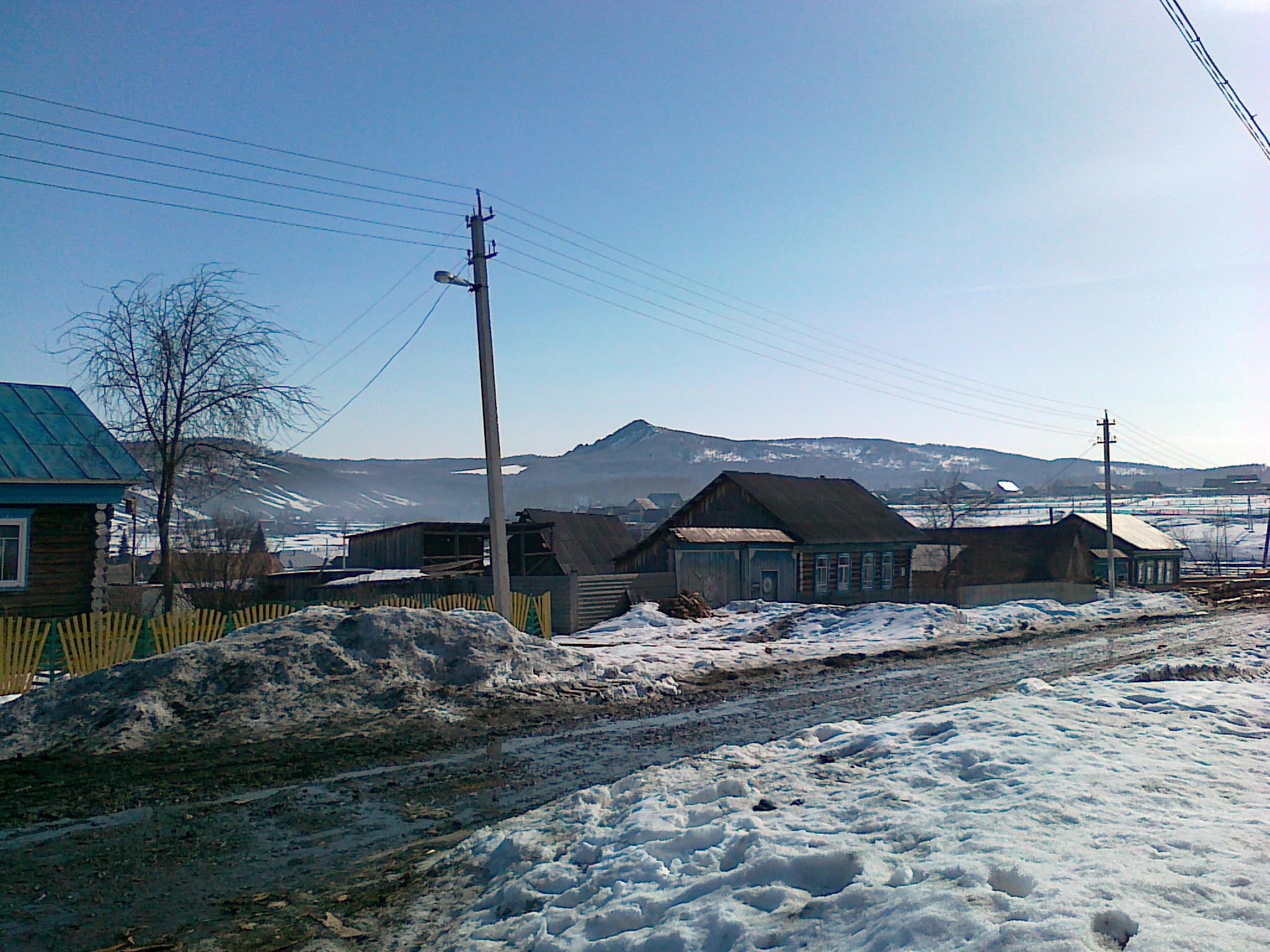

- Location within Bashkortostan Location within Russia
- Coordinates: 53°46′N 58°14′E
- Country: Russia
- Region: Bashkortostan
- District: Beloretsky District
- Time zone: UTC+5:00

Utkalevo (Russian: Уткалево; Bashkir: Үткәл, Ütkäl) is a rural locality (a selo) in Shigayevsky Selsoviet, Beloretsky District, Bashkortostan, Russia. The population was 396 as of 2010. There are 10 streets.

== Geography ==
Utkalevo is located 29 km southwest of Beloretsk (the district's administrative centre) by road. Rysakayevo is the nearest rural locality.
