= Makhmutovo, Beloretsky District, Republic of Bashkortostan =

Makhmutovo Махмутово
- Village
- Location within Bashkortostan Location within Russia
- Coordinates: 54°19′N 58°48′E
- Country: Russia
- Region: Bashkortostan
- District: Beloretsky District
- Time zone: UTC+5:00

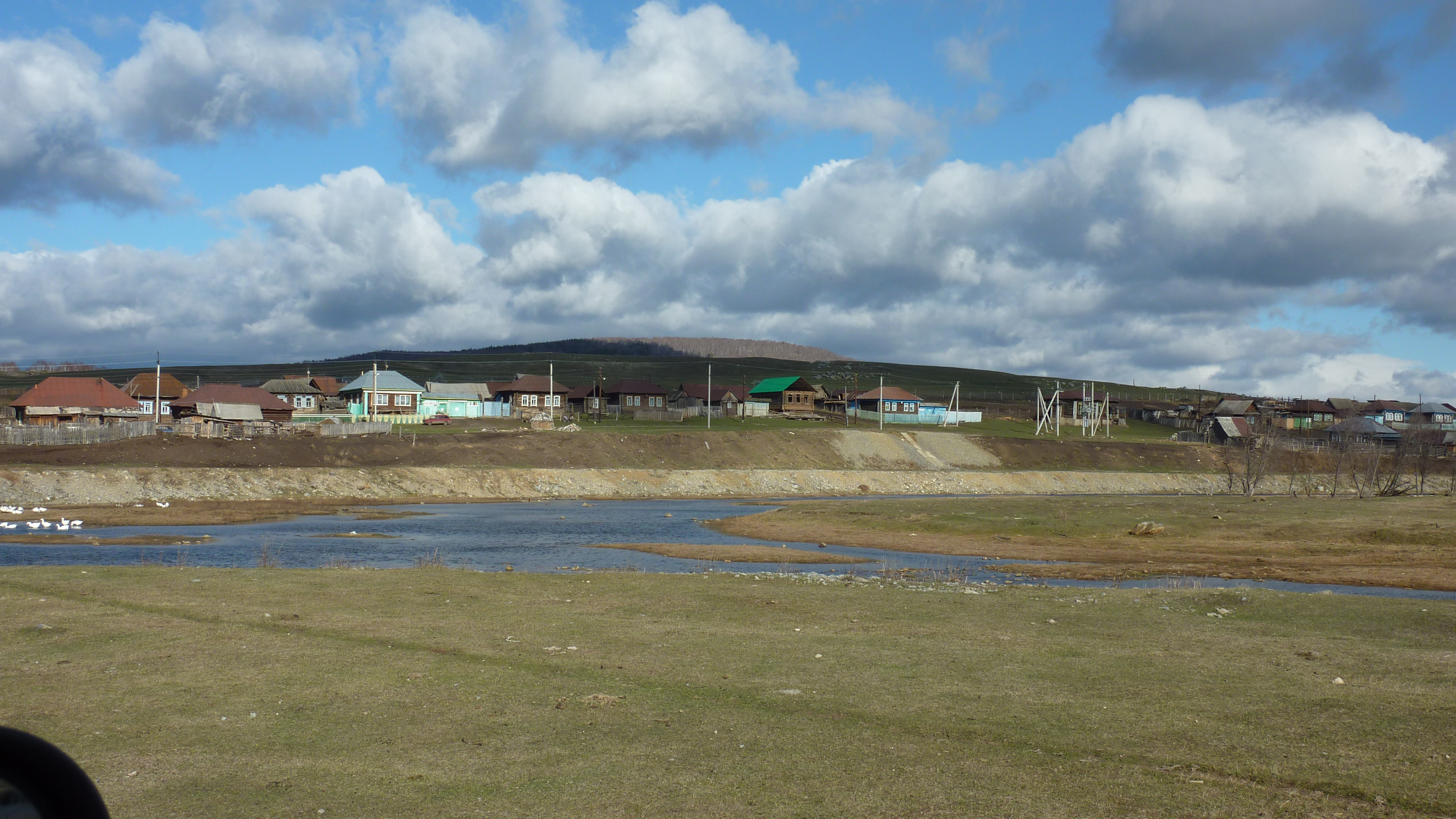

Makhmutovo (Russian: Махмутово; Bashkir: Мәхмүт, Mäxmüt) is a rural locality (a village) in Nikolayevsky Selsoviet, Beloretsky District, Bashkortostan, Russia. The population was 264 as of 2010. There are 5 streets.

Despite Makhmutovo's limited size, its locale has certain attractions to outsiders such natural landscapes. Furthermore, Makhmutovo favors a close proximity to the Abzakovo Ski Center.

== Geography ==
Makhmutovo is located 52 kilometres northeast of Beloretsk (the district's administrative centre) by road. Nikolayevka is the nearest rural locality.

Makhmutovo is situated in Southern Russia, close to the Kazakhstan border. Its neighbours include Orsk, Orenburg, and Chelyabinsk.

== District ==
Alone, Makhmutovo constitutes a small part of the larger district of Beloretsky . Beloretsky District serves as both an administrative and municipal district (raion) in the Republic of Bashkortostan, Russia. It is one of the republic's fifty-four districts. The district is positioned in the eastern part of Bashkortostan, with borders adjoining Chelyabinsk Oblast to the north, Uchalinsky District to the east,Abzelilovsky District to the southeast, Burzyansky District to the south, Ishimbaysky District to the southwest, and Gafuriysky and Arkhangelsky Districts to the west. Covering an area of 11,302.58 square kilometers (4,363.95 sq mi), its administrative center is the town of Beloretsk, which is not included administratively as part of the district. The population of Beloretsky District was recorded as 38,442 in the 2010 Census.

Beloretsky District is notable for its rich natural resources and diverse landscapes, which include parts of the Ural Mountains and numerous rivers and forests. The district has a strong industrial base, primarily centered around metalworking and mining, owing to the abundant mineral deposits in the region. Beloretsk, the administrative center, has a significant history as an industrial town dating back to the 18th century, when it was founded as a mining settlement. The district also has a number of cultural and historical sites, including several museums, monuments, and traditional Bashkir architecture. The local economy benefits from a mix of industrial, agricultural, and tourism sectors.
