= Kagarmanovo =

Kagarmanovo Кагарманово
- Village
- Location within Bashkortostan Location within Russia
- Coordinates: 53°38′N 57°47′E
- Country: Russia
- Region: Bashkortostan
- District: Beloretsky District
- Time zone: UTC+5:00

Kagarmanovo (Russian: Кагарманово; Bashkir: Ҡаһарман, Qaharman) is a rural locality (a village) in Uzyansky Selsoviet, Beloretsky District, Bashkortostan, Russia. The population was 432 as of 2010. There are 13 streets.

== Geography ==
Kagarmanovo is located 62 km southwest of Beloretsk (the district's administrative centre) by road. Uzyan is the nearest rural locality.
