= Novoabzakovo =

Novoabzakovo Новоабзаково
- Selo
- Location within Bashkortostan Location within Russia
- Coordinates: 53°48′N 58°38′E
- Country: Russia
- Region: Bashkortostan
- District: Beloretsky District
- Time zone: UTC+5:00

Novoabzakovo (Russian: Новоабзаково; Bashkir: Яңы Абҙаҡ, Yañı Abźaq) is a rural locality (a selo) in Abzakovsky Selsoviet, Beloretsky District, Bashkortostan, Russia. The population was 295 as of 2010. There are 22 streets.

== Geography ==
Novoabzakovo is located 27 km southeast of Beloretsk (the district's administrative centre) by road. Abzakovo is the nearest rural locality.
