= Arsky =

Arsky (masculine), Arskaya (feminine), or Arskoye (neuter) may refer to:

- Arsky District, a district of the Republic of Tatarstan, Russia
- Arskoye, Kirov Oblast, a rural locality (a selo) in Kirov Oblast, Russia
- Arskoye, Ulyanovsk Oblast, a rural locality (a selo) in Ulyanovsk Oblast, Russia
- Arskaya, a defunct village which existed near the town of Beloretsk (now in the Republic of Bashkortostan, Russia)
