= Verkhny Avzyan =

Verkhny Avzyan Верхний Авзян
- Selo
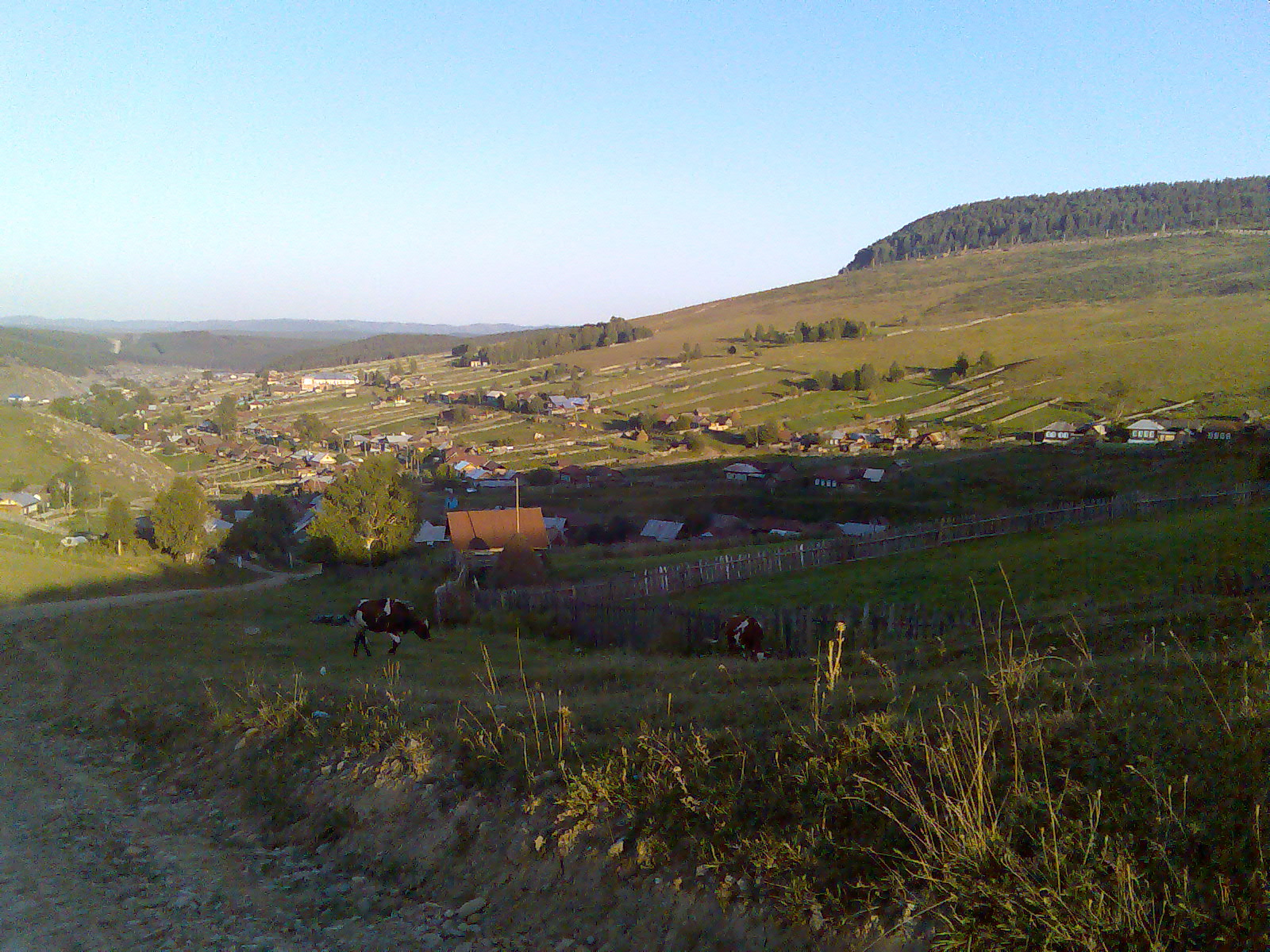
- View of Upper Avzyan

- Location within Bashkortostan Location within Russia
- Coordinates: 53°31′N 57°31′E
- Country: Russia
- Region: Bashkortostan
- District: Beloretsky District
- Time zone: UTC+5:00

Verkhny Avzyan (Russian: Верхний Авзян; Bashkir: Үрге Әүжән, Ürge Äwjän) is a rural locality (a selo) and the administrative centre of Verkhneavzyansky Selsoviet, Beloretsky District, Bashkortostan, Russia. The population was 2,024 as of 2010. There are 30 streets.

== Geography ==
Verkhny Avzyan is located 91 km southwest of Beloretsk (the district's administrative centre) by road. Nizhny Avzyan is the nearest rural locality.
