= Uzyan =

Uzyan Узян
- Selo
- Location within Bashkortostan Location within Russia
- Coordinates: 53°41′N 57°41′E
- Country: Russia
- Region: Bashkortostan
- District: Beloretsky District
- Time zone: UTC+5:00

Uzyan (Russian: Узян; Bashkir: Үҙән, Üźän) is a rural locality (a selo) and the administrative centre of Uzyansky Selsoviet, Beloretsky District, Bashkortostan, Russia. The population was 1,140 as of 2010. There are 23 streets.

== Geography ==
Uzyan is located 53 km southwest of Beloretsk (the district's administrative centre) by road. Kagarmanovo is the nearest rural locality.
