= Uzyanbash =

Uzyanbash Узянбаш
- Selo
- Location within Bashkortostan Location within Russia
- Coordinates: 53°40′N 58°14′E
- Country: Russia
- Region: Bashkortostan
- District: Beloretsky District
- Time zone: UTC+5:00

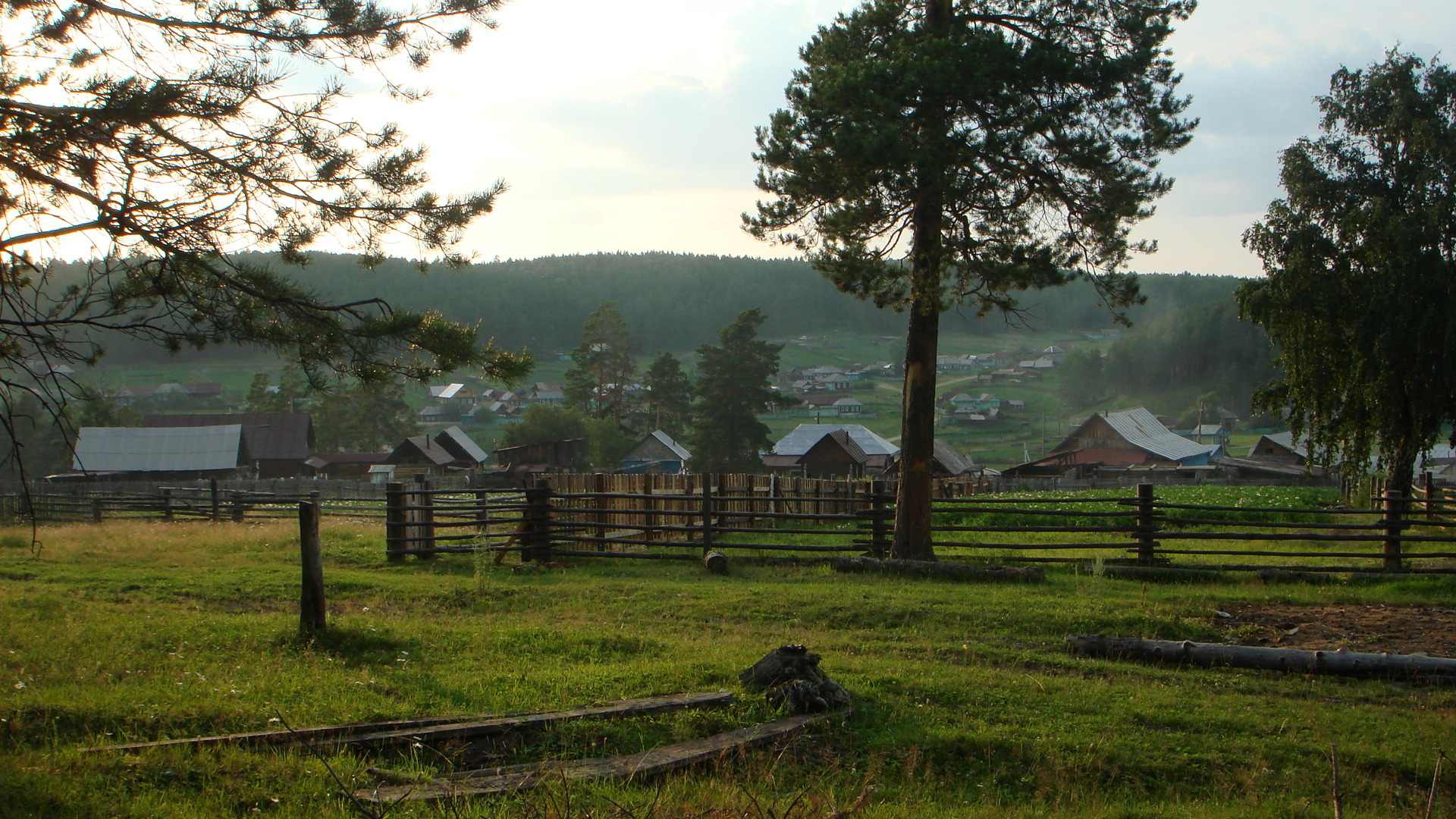

Uzyanbash (Russian: Узянбаш; Bashkir: Үҙәнбаш, Üźänbaş) is a rural locality (a selo) in Shigayevsky Selsoviet, Beloretsky District, Bashkortostan, Russia. The population was 636 as of 2010. There are 8 streets.

== Geography ==
Uzyanbash is located 42 km southwest of Beloretsk (the district's administrative centre) by road. Khusainovo is the nearest rural locality.
