= Nukatovo =

Nukatovo Нукатово
- Selo
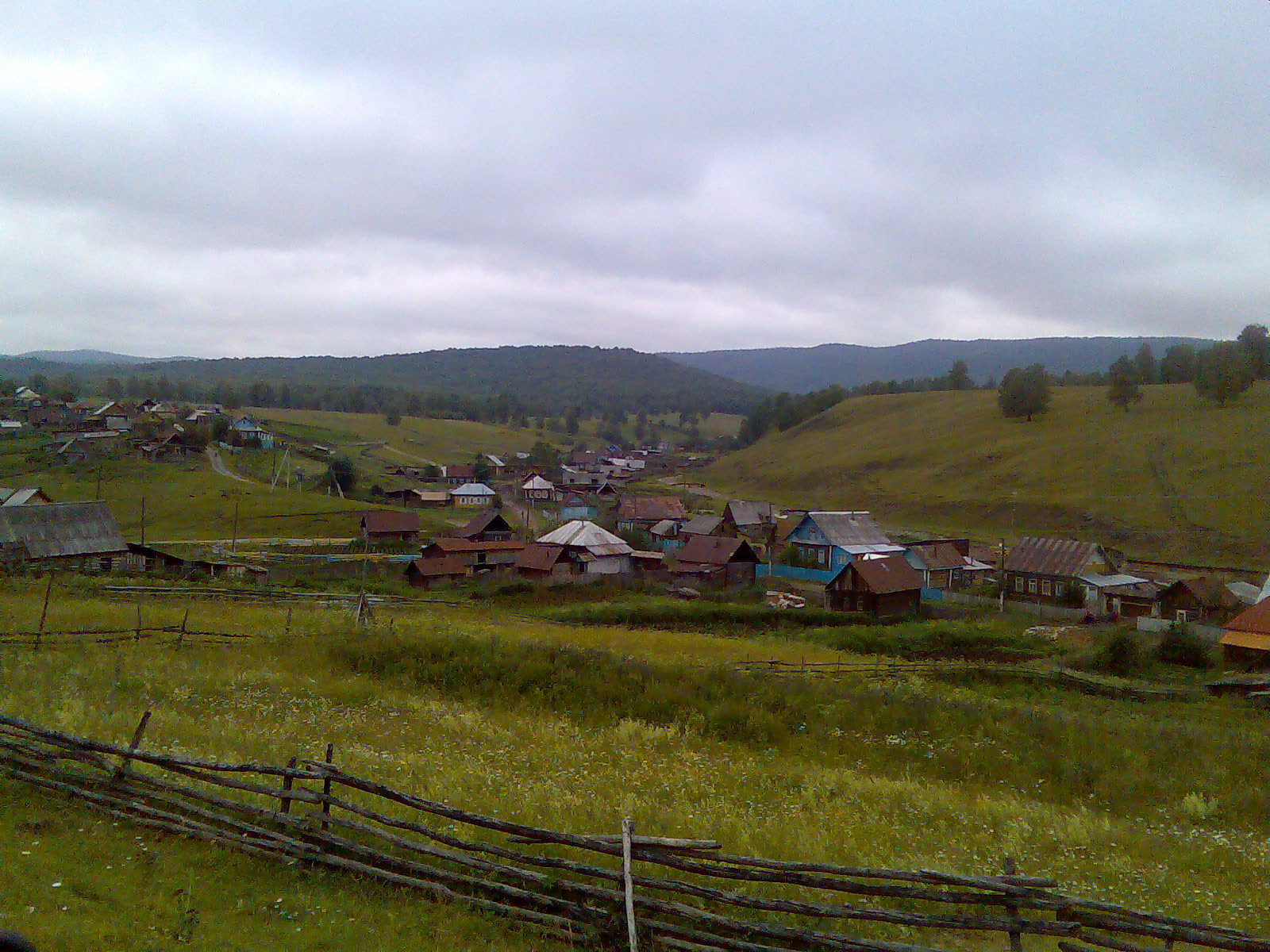

- Location within Bashkortostan Location within Russia
- Coordinates: 54°10′N 57°22′E
- Country: Russia
- Region: Bashkortostan
- District: Beloretsky District
- Time zone: UTC+5:00

Nukatovo (Russian: Нукатово; Bashkir: Ноҡат, Noqat) is a rural locality (a selo) in Inzersky Selsoviet, Beloretsky District, Bashkortostan, Russia. The population was 148 as of 2010. There are 2 streets.

== Geography ==
Nukatovo is located 109 km northwest of Beloretsk (the district's administrative centre) by road. Aryshparovo is the nearest rural locality.
