= Kadysh =

Kadysh Кадыш
- Village
- Location within Bashkortostan Location within Russia
- Coordinates: 53°55′N 58°10′E
- Country: Russia
- Region: Bashkortostan
- District: Beloretsky District
- Time zone: UTC+5:00

Kadysh (Russian: Кадыш; Bashkir: Ҡаҙыш, Qaźış) is a rural locality (a village) in Azikeyevsky Selsoviet, Beloretsky District, Bashkortostan, Russia. The population was 80 as of 2010. There are 3 streets.

== Geography ==
Kadysh is located 17 km southwest of Beloretsk (the district's administrative centre) by road. Aznalkino is the nearest rural locality.
