= Saryshka =

Saryshka Сарышка
- Village
- Location within Bashkortostan Location within Russia
- Coordinates: 53°53′N 57°12′E
- Country: Russia
- Region: Bashkortostan
- District: Beloretsky District
- Time zone: UTC+5:00

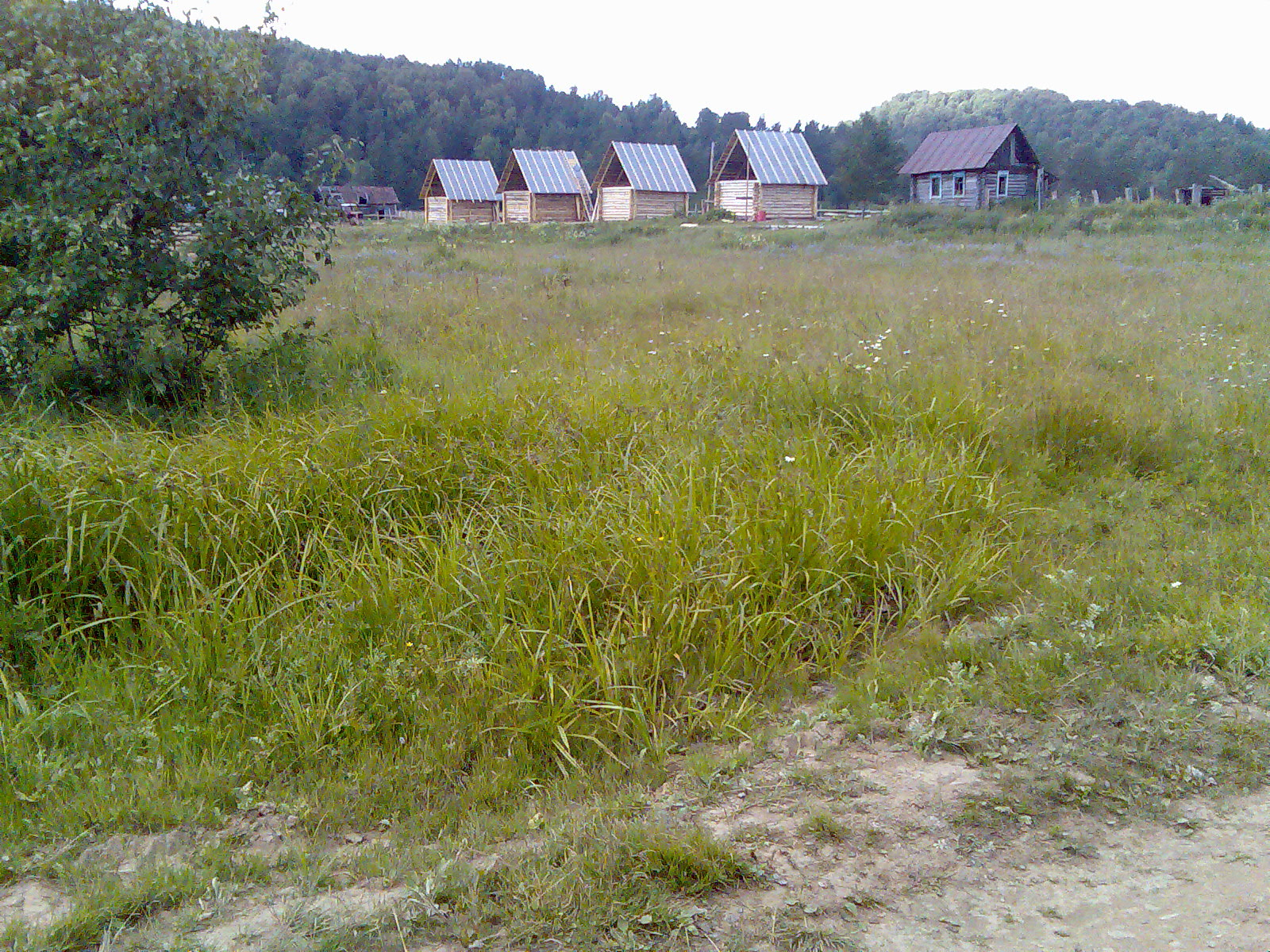
Saryshka village site (date unknown)

Saryshka (Russian: Сарышка; Bashkir: Сырышҡы, Sırışqı) is a rural locality (a village) in Zigazinsky Selsoviet, Beloretsky District, Bashkortostan, Russia. The population was 1 as of 2010.

== Geography ==
Saryshka is located 107 km west of Beloretsk (the district's administrative centre) by road. Butayevo is the nearest rural locality.
