= Zigaza =

Zigaza Зигаза
- Selo
- Location within Bashkortostan Location within Russia
- Coordinates: 53°50′N 57°19′E
- Country: Russia
- Region: Bashkortostan
- District: Beloretsky District
- Time zone: UTC+5:00

Zigaza (Russian: Зигаза; Bashkir: Егәҙе, Yegäźe) is a rural locality (a selo) and the administrative centre of Zigazinsky Selsoviet, Beloretsky District, Bashkortostan, Russia. The population was 638 as of 2010. There are 10 streets.

== Geography ==
Zigaza is located 91 km west of Beloretsk (the district's administrative centre) by road. Butayevo is the nearest rural locality.
