= Katarysh =

Katarysh Катарыш
- Village
- Location within Bashkortostan Location within Russia
- Coordinates: 53°40′N 58°01′E
- Country: Russia
- Region: Bashkortostan
- District: Beloretsky District
- Time zone: UTC+5:00

Katarysh (Russian: Катарыш; Bashkir: Ҡатарыш, Qatarış) is a rural locality (a village) in Uzyansky Selsoviet, Beloretsky District, Bashkortostan, Russia. The population was 14 as of 2010. There is 1 street.

== Geography ==
Katarysh is located 65 km southwest of Beloretsk (the district's administrative centre) by road. Uzyan is the nearest rural locality.
