= Mukhametovo =

Mukhametovo Мухаметово
- Village
- Location within Bashkortostan Location within Russia
- Coordinates: 53°41′N 58°28′E
- Country: Russia
- Region: Bashkortostan
- District: Beloretsky District
- Time zone: UTC+5:00

Mukhametovo (Russian: Мухаметово; Bashkir: Мөхәмәт, Möxämät) is a rural locality (a village) in Abzakovsky Selsoviet, Beloretsky District, Bashkortostan, Russia. The population was 213 as of 2010. There are 2 streets.

== Geography ==
Mukhametovo is located 42 km south of Beloretsk (the district's administrative centre) by road. Abzakovo is the nearest rural locality.
