= Buganak =

Buganak Буганак
- Selo
- Location within Bashkortostan Location within Russia
- Coordinates: 53°54′N 58°13′E
- Country: Russia
- Region: Bashkortostan
- District: Beloretsky District
- Time zone: UTC+5:00

Buganak (Russian: Буганак; Bashkir: Боғанаҡ, Boğanaq) is a rural locality (a selo) in Azikeyevsky Selsoviet, Beloretsky District, Bashkortostan, Russia. The population was 773 as of 2010. There are 18 streets.

== Geography ==
Buganak is located 18 km southwest of Beloretsk (the district's administrative centre) by road. Azikeyevo is the nearest rural locality.
