= Nizhnyaya Manyava =

Nizhnyaya Manyava Нижняя Манява
- Khutor
- Location within Bashkortostan Location within Russia
- Coordinates: 54°04′N 57°45′E
- Country: Russia
- Region: Bashkortostan
- District: Beloretsky District
- Time zone: UTC+5:00

Nizhnyaya Manyava (Russian: Нижняя Манява; Bashkir: Түбәнге Мәнәү, Tübänge Mänäw) is a rural locality (a khutor) in Inzersky Selsoviet, Beloretsky District, Bashkortostan, Russia. The population was 6 as of 2010. There is 1 street.

== Geography ==
Nizhnyaya Manyava is located 61 km northwest of Beloretsk (the district's administrative centre) by road. Verkhnyaya Manyava is the nearest rural locality.
