= Aznagulovo =

Aznagulovo Азнагулово
- Village
- Location within Bashkortostan Location within Russia
- Coordinates: 53°50′N 57°58′E
- Country: Russia
- Region: Bashkortostan
- District: Beloretsky District
- Time zone: UTC+5:00

Aznagulovo (Russian: Азнагулово; Bashkir: Аҙнағол, Aźnağol) is a rural locality (a village) in Sermenevsky Selsoviet, Beloretsky District, Bashkortostan, Russia. The population was 290 as of 2010. There are 3 streets.

== Geography ==
Aznagulovo is located 34 km southwest of Beloretsk (the district's administrative centre) by road. Sermenevo is the nearest rural locality.
