= Usmangali =

Usmangali Усмангали
- Selo
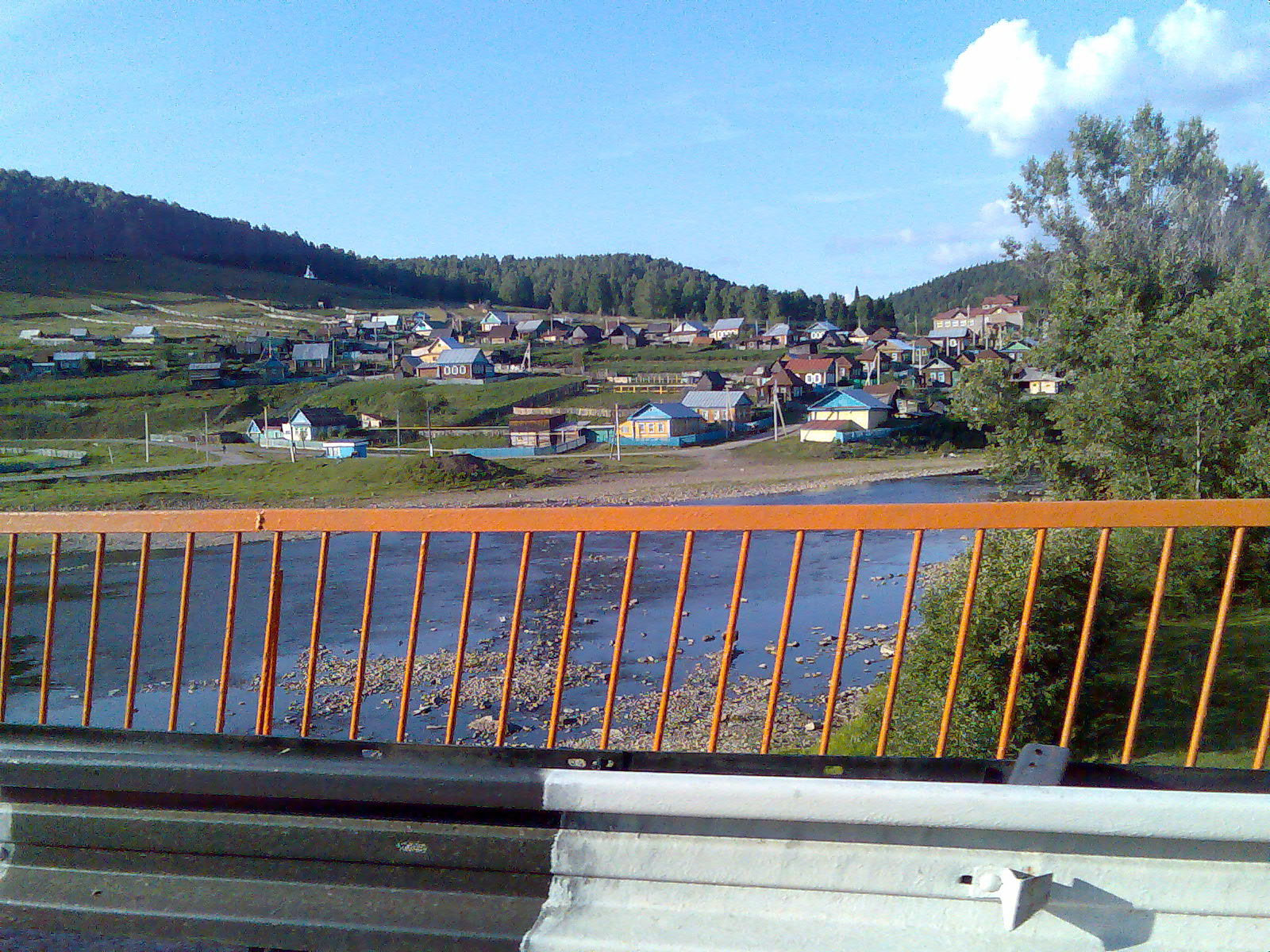

- Location within Bashkortostan Location within Russia
- Coordinates: 54°13′N 57°30′E
- Country: Russia
- Region: Bashkortostan
- District: Beloretsky District
- Time zone: UTC+5:00

Usmangali (Russian: Усмангали; Bashkir: Уҫманғәле, Uśmanğäle) is a rural locality (a selo) in Inzersky Selsoviet, Beloretsky District, Bashkortostan, Russia. The population was 404, as of 2010. There are 9 streets.

== Geography ==
Usmangali is located 95 km northwest of Beloretsk (the district's administrative centre) by road. Inzer is the nearest rural locality.
