= Gabdyukovo =

Gabdyukovo Габдюково
- Selo
- Location within Bashkortostan Location within Russia
- Coordinates: 54°27′N 57°16′E
- Country: Russia
- Region: Bashkortostan
- District: Beloretsky District
- Time zone: UTC+5:00

Gabdyukovo (Russian: Габдюково; Bashkir: Ғәбдөк, Ğäbdök) is a rural locality (a selo) in Zuyakovsky Selsoviet, Beloretsky District, Bashkortostan, Russia. The population was 558 as of 2010. There are 5 streets.

== Geography ==
Gabdyukovo is located 139 km northwest of Beloretsk (the district's administrative centre) by road. Karagay is the nearest rural locality.
