= Shigayevo =

Shigayevo Шигаево
- Selo
- Location within Bashkortostan Location within Russia
- Coordinates: 53°48′N 58°12′E
- Country: Russia
- Region: Bashkortostan
- District: Beloretsky District
- Time zone: UTC+5:00

Shigayevo (Russian: Шигаево; Bashkir: Шығай, Şığay) is a rural locality (a selo) and the administrative centre of Shigayevsky Selsoviet, Beloretsky District, Bashkortostan, Russia. The population was 571 as of 2010. There are 12 streets.

== Geography ==
Shigayevo is located 39 km southwest of Beloretsk (the district's administrative centre) by road. Utkalevo is the nearest rural locality.
