= Azikeyevo =

Azikeyevo Азикеево
- Selo
- Location within Bashkortostan Location within Russia
- Coordinates: 53°56′N 58°14′E
- Country: Russia
- Region: Bashkortostan
- District: Beloretsky District
- Time zone: UTC+5:00

Azikeyevo (Russian: Азикеево; Bashkir: Әзекәй, Äzekäy) is a rural locality (a selo) and the administrative centre of Azikeyevsky Selsoviet, Beloretsky District, Bashkortostan, Russia. The population was 399 as of 2010. There are 15 streets.

== Geography ==
Azikeyevo is located 13 km southwest of Beloretsk (the district's administrative centre) by road. Buganak is the nearest rural locality.
