= Verkhnebelsky =

Verkhnebelsky Верхнебельский
- Selo
- Location within Bashkortostan Location within Russia
- Coordinates: 53°54′N 58°13′E
- Country: Russia
- Region: Bashkortostan
- District: Beloretsky District
- Time zone: UTC+5:00

Verkhnebelsky (Russian: Верхнебельский) is a rural locality (a selo) in Nikolayevsky Selsoviet, Beloretsky District, Bashkortostan, Russia. The population was 322 as of 2010. There are 6 streets.

== Geography ==
Verkhnebelsky is located 36 km northeast of Beloretsk (the district's administrative centre) by road. Tirlyansky is the nearest rural locality.
