= Aznalkino =

Aznalkino Азналкино
- Selo
- Location within Bashkortostan Location within Russia
- Coordinates: 53°55′N 58°09′E
- Country: Russia
- Region: Bashkortostan
- District: Beloretsky District
- Time zone: UTC+5:00

Aznalkino (Russian: Азналкино; Bashkir: Аҙналы, Aźnalı) is a rural locality (a selo) in Azikeyevsky Selsoviet, Beloretsky District, Bashkortostan, Russia. The population was 415 as of 2010. There are 10 streets.

== Geography ==
Aznalkino is located 20 km southwest of Beloretsk (the district's administrative centre) by road. Azikeyevo is the nearest rural locality.
