= Kartalinskaya Zapan =

Kartalinskaya Zapan Карталинская Запань
- Village
- Location within Bashkortostan Location within Russia
- Coordinates: 53°56′N 57°48′E
- Country: Russia
- Region: Bashkortostan
- District: Beloretsky District
- Time zone: UTC+5:00

Kartalinskaya Zapan (Russian: Карталинская Запань; Bashkir: Кәртәле Запане, Kärtäle Zapane) is a rural locality (a village) in Ishlinsky Selsoviet, Beloretsky District, Bashkortostan, Russia. The population was 17 as of 2010. There are 5 streets.

== Geography ==
Kartalinskaya Zapan is located 53 km west of Beloretsk (the district's administrative centre) by road. Tikhy Klyuch is the nearest rural locality.
