= Kudashmanovo =

Kudashmanovo Кудашманово
- Village
- Location within Bashkortostan Location within Russia
- Coordinates: 53°53′N 57°50′E
- Country: Russia
- Region: Bashkortostan
- District: Beloretsky District
- Time zone: UTC+5:00

Kudashmanovo (Russian: Кудашманово; Bashkir: Ҡоҙашман, Qoźaşman) is a rural locality (a village) in Ishlinsky Selsoviet, Beloretsky District, Bashkortostan, Russia. The population was 16 as of 2010. There is 1 street.

== Geography ==
Kudashmanovo is located 48 km west of Beloretsk (the district's administrative centre) by road. Ishlya is the nearest rural locality.
