= Brish, Beloretsky District, Republic of Bashkortostan =

Brish Бриш
- Selo
- Location within Bashkortostan Location within Russia
- Coordinates: 54°24′N 57°30′E
- Country: Russia
- Region: Bashkortostan
- District: Beloretsky District
- Time zone: UTC+5:00

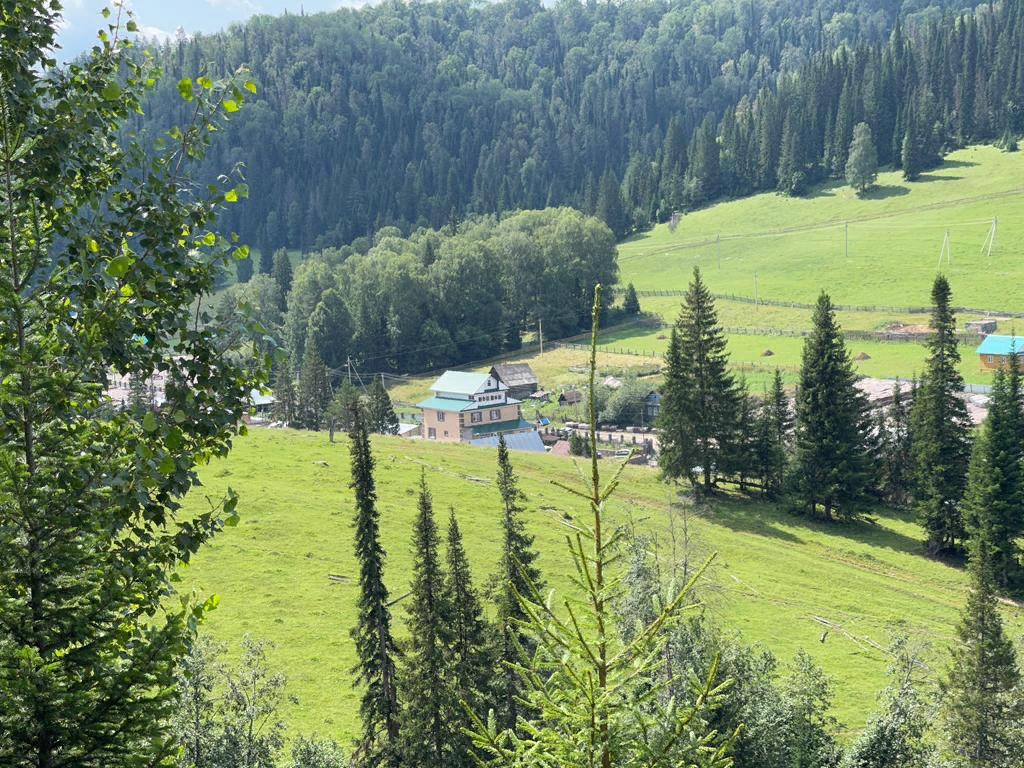

Brish (Russian: Бриш; Bashkir: Береш, Bereş) is a rural locality (a selo) in Assinsky Selsoviet, Beloretsky District, Bashkortostan, Russia. The population was 263 as of 2010. There are 3 streets.

== Geography ==
Brish is located 124 km northwest of Beloretsk (the district's administrative centre) by road. Brishtamak is the nearest rural locality.
