= Kartaly, Beloretsky District, Republic of Bashkortostan =

Kartaly Карталы
- Village
- Location within Bashkortostan Location within Russia
- Coordinates: 53°57′N 57°51′E
- Country: Russia
- Region: Bashkortostan
- District: Beloretsky District
- Time zone: UTC+5:00

Kartaly (Russian: Карталы; Bashkir: Кәртәле, Kärtäle) is a rural locality (a village) in Ishlinsky Selsoviet, Beloretsky District, Bashkortostan, Russia. The population was 34 as of 2010. There are 2 streets.

== Geography ==
Kartaly is located 44 km west of Beloretsk (the district's administrative centre) by road. Tikhy Klyuch is the nearest rural locality.
