= Aygir =

Aygir Айгир
- Village
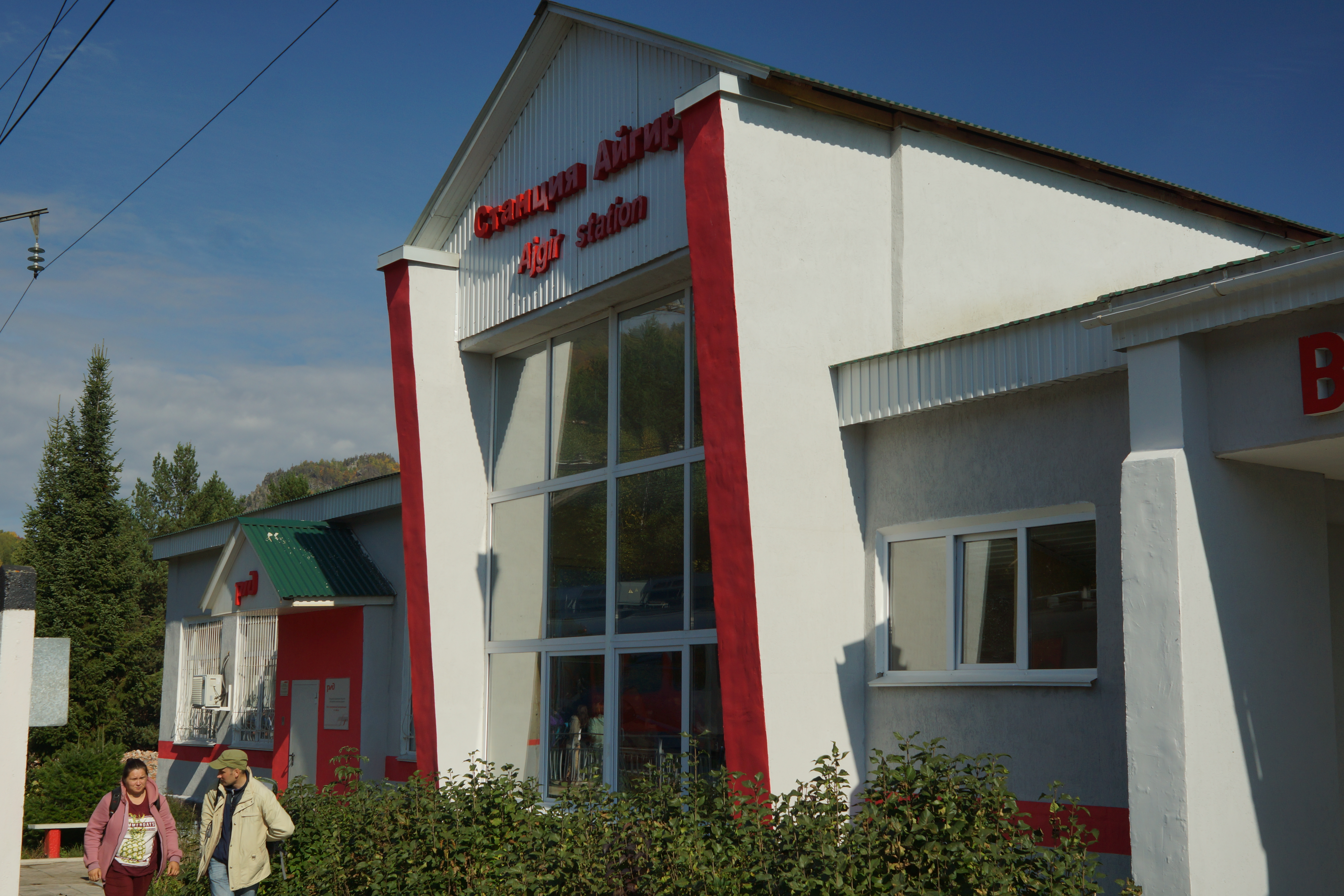

- Location within Bashkortostan Location within Russia
- Coordinates: 54°07′N 57°41′E
- Country: Russia
- Region: Bashkortostan
- District: Beloretsky District
- Time zone: UTC+5:00

Aygir (Russian: Айгир; Bashkir: Айғыр, Ayğır) is a rural locality (a village) in Inzersky Selsoviet, Beloretsky District, Bashkortostan, Russia. The population was 12 as of 2010. There is 1 street.

== Geography ==
Aygir is located 97 km northwest of Beloretsk (the district's administrative centre) by road. Nizhnyaya Manyava is the nearest rural locality.
