= Manyshta =

Manyshta Манышта
- Selo
- Location within Bashkortostan Location within Russia
- Coordinates: 54°16′N 57°36′E
- Country: Russia
- Region: Bashkortostan
- District: Beloretsky District
- Time zone: UTC+5:00

Manyshta (Russian: Манышта; Bashkir: Манышты, Manıştı) is a rural locality (a selo) in Inzersky Selsoviet, Beloretsky District, Bashkortostan, Russia. The population was 372 as of 2010. There are 11 streets.

== Geography ==
Manyshta is located 96 km northwest of Beloretsk (the district's administrative centre) by road. Safargulovo is the nearest rural locality.
