= Kasmakty =

Kasmakty Касмакты
- Village
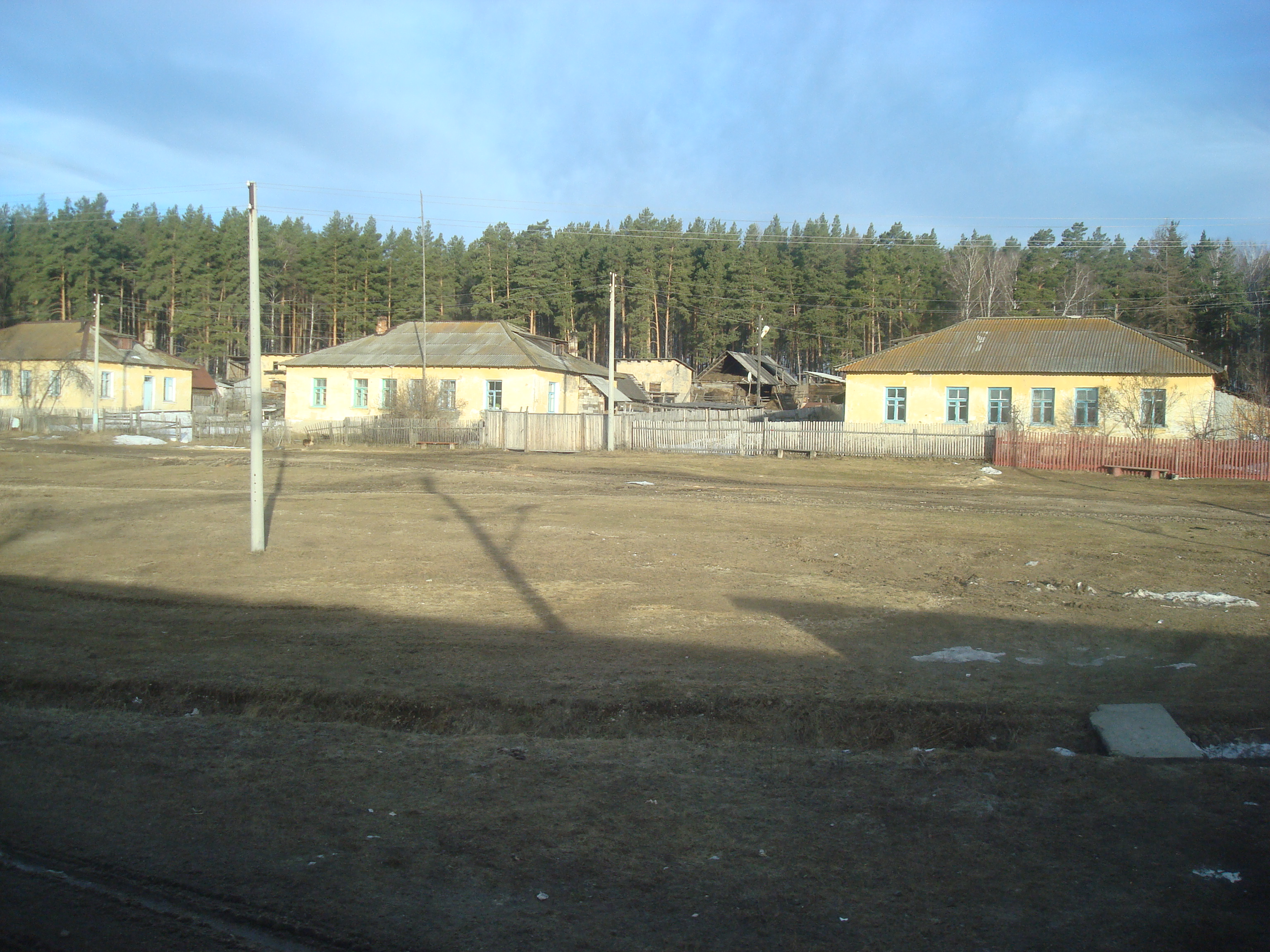

- Location within Bashkortostan Location within Russia
- Coordinates: 53°53′N 58°35′E
- Country: Russia
- Region: Bashkortostan
- District: Beloretsky District
- Time zone: UTC+5:00

Kasmakty (Russian: Касмакты; Bashkir: Ҡаҫмаҡты, Qaśmaqtı) is a rural locality (a village) in Abzakovsky Selsoviet, Beloretsky District, Bashkortostan, Russia. The population was 14 as of 2010. There is 1 street.

== Geography ==
Kasmakty is located 14 km southeast of Beloretsk (the district's administrative centre) by road. Abzakovo is the nearest rural locality.
