= Berdagulovo =

Berdagulovo Бердагулово
- Village
- Location within Bashkortostan Location within Russia
- Coordinates: 54°09′N 57°46′E
- Country: Russia
- Region: Bashkortostan
- District: Beloretsky District
- Time zone: UTC+5:00

Berdagulovo (Russian: Бердагулово; Bashkir: Бирҙеғол, Birźeğol) is a rural locality (a village) in Inzersky Selsoviet, Beloretsky District, Bashkortostan, Russia. The population was 240 as of 2010. There are 7 streets.

== Geography ==
Berdagulovo is located 70 km northwest of Beloretsk (the district's administrative centre) by road. Revet is the nearest rural locality.
