= Yermotayevo =

Yermotayevo Ермотаево
- Village
- Location within Bashkortostan Location within Russia
- Coordinates: 53°47′N 57°25′E
- Country: Russia
- Region: Bashkortostan
- District: Beloretsky District
- Time zone: UTC+5:00

Yermotayevo (Russian: Ермотаево; Bashkir: Йүрмәтау, Yürmätaw) is a rural locality (a village) in Tukansky Selsoviet, Beloretsky District, Bashkortostan, Russia. The population was 5 as of 2010. There are 6 streets.

== Geography ==
Yermotayevo is located 84 km southwest of Beloretsk (the district's administrative centre) by road. Komarovo is the nearest rural locality.
