= Bzyak =

Bzyak Бзяк
- Village
- Location within Bashkortostan Location within Russia
- Coordinates: 53°49′N 57°32′E
- Country: Russia
- Region: Bashkortostan
- District: Beloretsky District
- Time zone: UTC+5:00

Bzyak (Russian: Бзяк; Bashkir: Беҙәк, Beźäk) is a rural locality (a village) in Tukansky Selsoviet, Beloretsky District, Bashkortostan, Russia. The population was 48 as of 2010. There are 3 streets.

== Geography ==
Bzyak is located 73 km west of Beloretsk (the district's administrative centre) by road. Akhmerovo is the nearest rural locality.
