= Zapadnaya Maygashlya =

Zapadnaya Maygashlya Западная Майгашля
- Village
- Location within Bashkortostan Location within Russia
- Coordinates: 53°45′N 57°21′E
- Country: Russia
- Region: Bashkortostan
- District: Beloretsky District
- Time zone: UTC+5:00

Zapadnaya Maygashlya (Russian: Западная Майгашля; Bashkir: Көнбайыш Мәйгәшле, Könbayış Mäygäşle) is a rural locality (a village) in Tukansky Selsoviet, Beloretsky District, Bashkortostan, Russia. The population was 1 as of 2010. There is 1 street.

== Geography ==
Zapadnaya Maygashlya is located 92 km southwest of Beloretsk (the district's administrative centre) by road. Tara is the nearest rural locality.
