= Novobelskoye =

Novobelskoye Новобельское
- Village
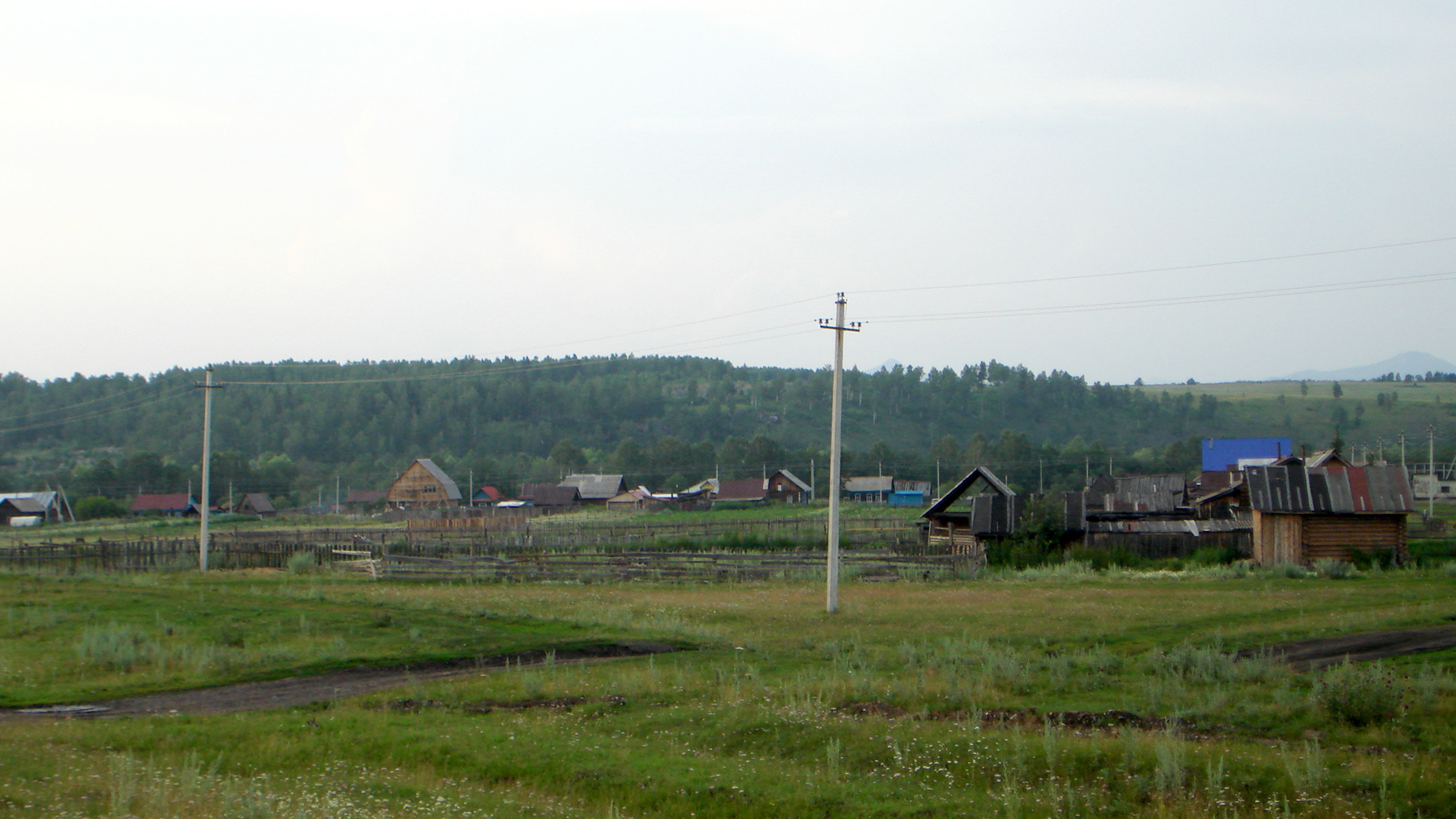
- Novobelskoe, Bashkortostan

- Location within Bashkortostan Location within Russia
- Coordinates: 53°51′N 58°10′E
- Country: Russia
- Region: Bashkortostan
- District: Beloretsky District
- Time zone: UTC+5:00

Novobelskoye (Russian: Новобельское) is a rural locality (a village) in Shigayevsky Selsoviet, Beloretsky District, Bashkortostan, Russia. The population was 136 as of 2010. There are 6 streets.

== Geography ==
Novobelskoye is located 33 km southwest of Beloretsk (the district's administrative centre) by road. Idel is the nearest rural locality.
