= Roshcha =

Roshcha Роща
- Village
- Location within Bashkortostan Location within Russia
- Coordinates: 53°39′N 57°54′E
- Country: Russia
- Region: Bashkortostan
- District: Beloretsky District
- Time zone: UTC+5:00

Roshcha (Russian: Роща) is a rural locality (a village) in Uzyansky Selsoviet, Beloretsky District, Bashkortostan, Russia. The population was 27 as of 2010. There is 1 street.

== Geography ==
Roshcha is located 56 km southwest of Beloretsk (the district's administrative centre) by road. Uzyan is the nearest rural locality.
