= Uraltau =

Uraltau Уралтау
- Selo
- Location within Bashkortostan Location within Russia
- Coordinates: 53°58′N 58°34′E
- Country: Russia
- Region: Bashkortostan
- District: Beloretsky District
- Time zone: UTC+5:00

Uraltau (Russian: Уралтау; Bashkir: Урал-Тау, Ural-Taw) is a rural locality (a selo) in Abzakovsky Selsoviet, Beloretsky District, Bashkortostan, Russia. The population was 78 as of 2010. There is 1 street.

== Geography ==
Uraltau is located 13 km east of Beloretsk (the district's administrative centre) by road. Karagayly is the nearest rural locality.
