= Aryshparovo =

Aryshparovo Арышпарово
- Selo
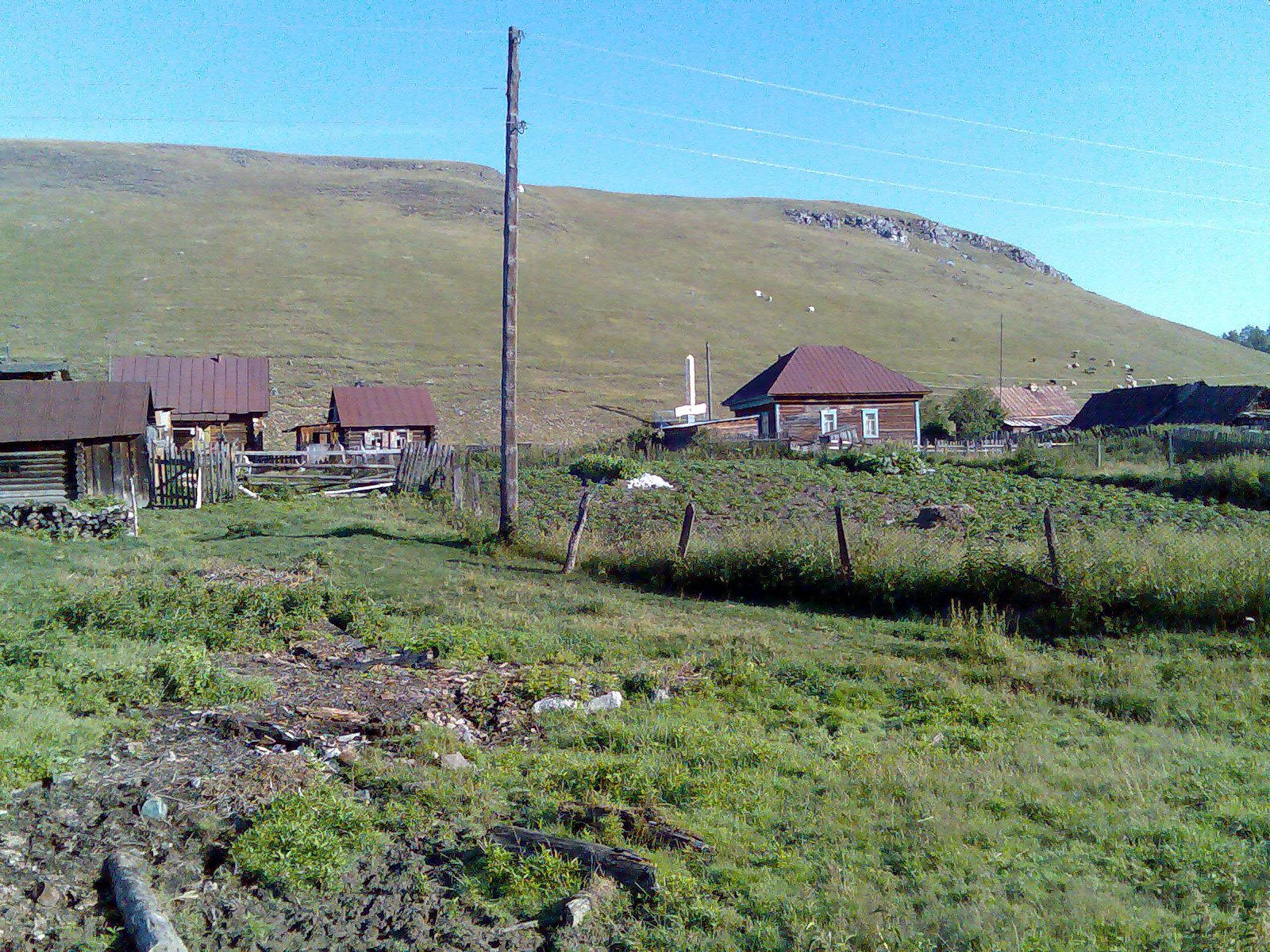
- A picture of Aryshparovo, Russia

- Location within Bashkortostan Location within Russia
- Coordinates: 54°08′N 57°22′E
- Country: Russia
- Region: Bashkortostan
- District: Beloretsky District
- Time zone: UTC+5:00

Aryshparovo (Russian: Арышпарово; Bashkir: Арышпар, Arışpar) is a rural locality (a selo) in Inzersky Selsoviet, Beloretsky District, Bashkortostan, Russia.

== Demographics ==
The population was 59 as of 2010. There is 1 street.

== Geography ==
Aryshparovo is located 115 km northwest of Beloretsk (the district's administrative centre) by road. Nukatovo is the nearest rural locality.
