= Uluyelga =

Uluyelga Улуелга
- Selo
- Location within Bashkortostan Location within Russia
- Coordinates: 53°55′N 57°55′E
- Country: Russia
- Region: Bashkortostan
- District: Beloretsky District
- Time zone: UTC+5:00

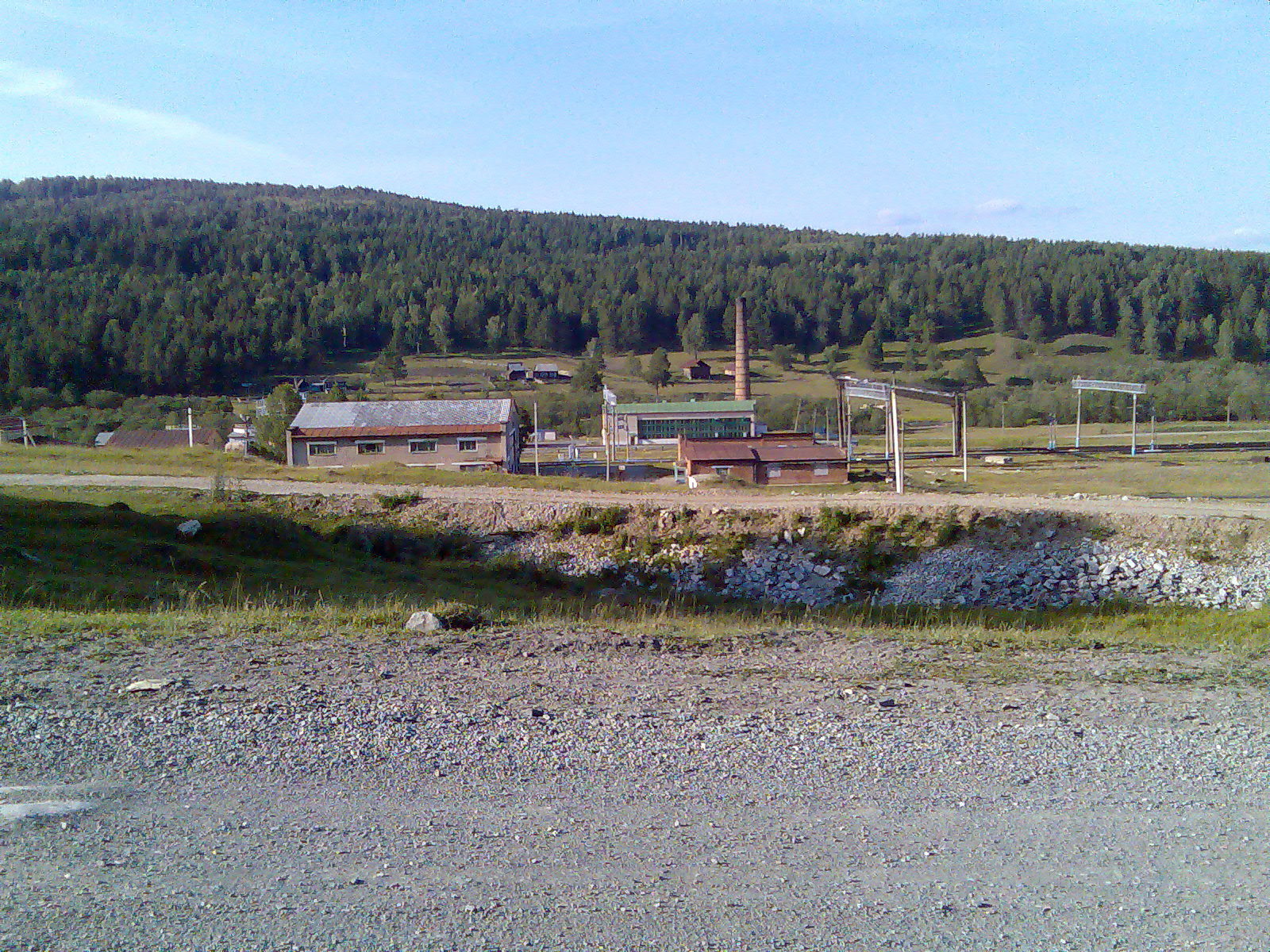

Uluyelga (Russian: Улуелга; Bashkir: Олойылға, Oloyılğa) is a rural locality (a selo) in Ishlinsky Selsoviet, Beloretsky District, Bashkortostan, Russia. The population was 453 as of 2010. There are 5 streets.

== Geography ==
Uluyelga is located 39 km west of Beloretsk (the district's administrative centre) by road. Karagay-Yurt is the nearest rural locality.
