= Yandek =

Yandek Яндек
- Village
- Location within Bashkortostan Location within Russia
- Coordinates: 53°54′N 58°06′E
- Country: Russia
- Region: Bashkortostan
- District: Beloretsky District
- Time zone: UTC+5:00

Yandek (Russian: Яндек; Bashkir: Йәндек, Yändek) is a rural locality (a village) in Sermenevsky Selsoviet, Beloretsky District, Bashkortostan, Russia. The population was 23 as of 2010. There is 1 street.

== Geography ==
Yandek is located 28 km southwest of Beloretsk (the district's administrative centre) by road. Sermenyovo is the nearest rural locality.
