= Zuyakovo =

Zuyakovo Зуяково
- Selo
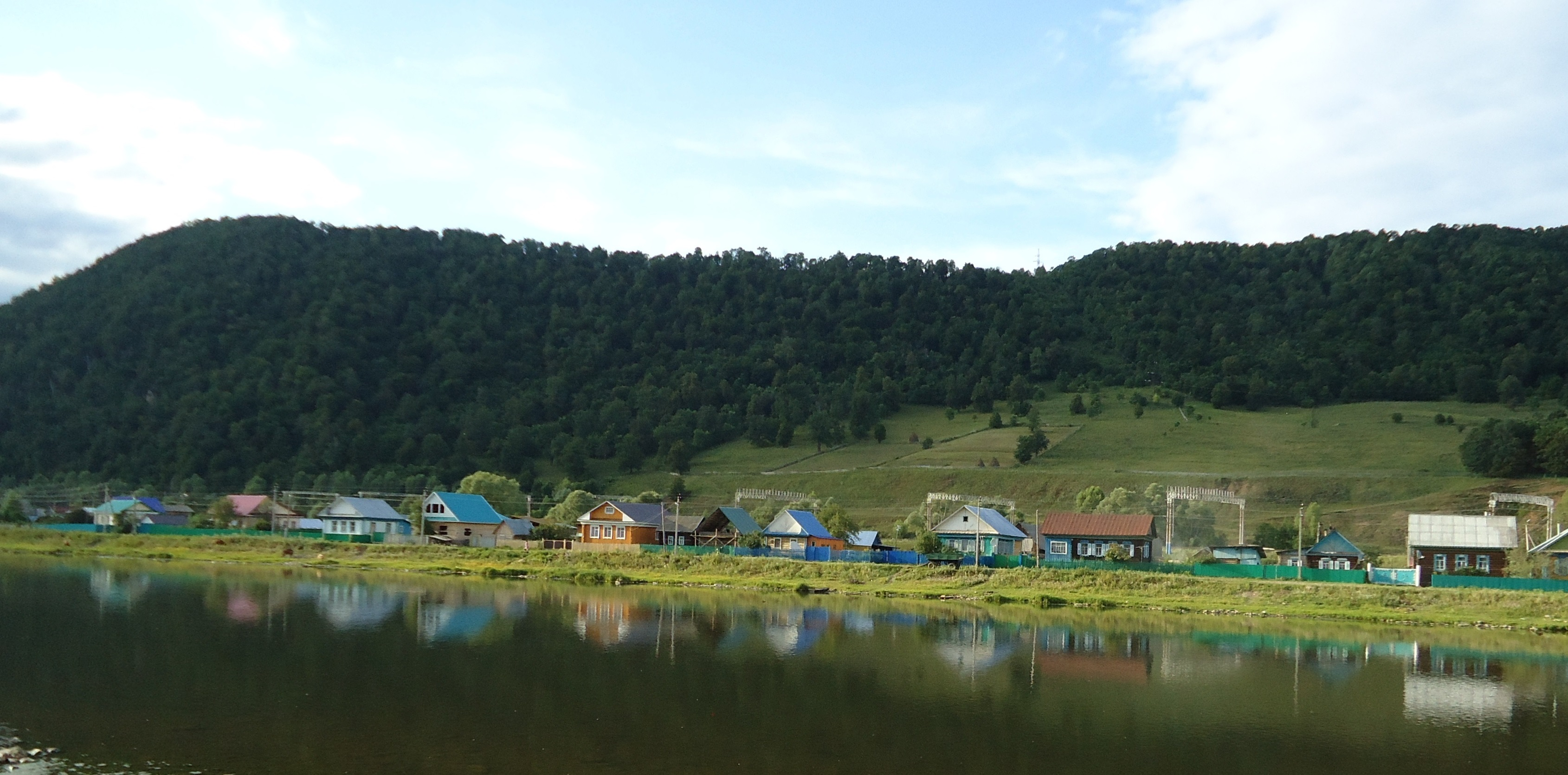
- Zuyakovo in 2022

- Location within Bashkortostan Location within Russia
- Coordinates: 54°24′N 57°22′E
- Country: Russia
- Region: Bashkortostan
- District: Beloretsky District
- Time zone: UTC+5:00

Zuyakovo (Russian: Зуяково; Bashkir: Йөйәк, Yöyäk) is a rural locality (a selo) and the administrative centre of Zuyakovsky Selsoviet, Beloretsky District, Bashkortostan, Russia. The population was 849 as of 2010. There are 10 streets.

== Geography ==
Zuyakovo is located 132 km (82 mi) northwest of Beloretsk (the district's administrative centre) by road. Brishtamak is the nearest rural locality.
