= Ishlya =

Ishlya Ишля
- Selo
- Location within Bashkortostan Location within Russia
- Coordinates: 53°53′N 57°48′E
- Country: Russia
- Region: Bashkortostan
- District: Beloretsky District
- Time zone: UTC+5:00

Ishlya (Russian: Ишля; Bashkir: Ишле, İşle) is a rural locality (a selo) and the administrative centre of Ishlinsky Selsoviet, Beloretsky District, Bashkortostan, Russia. The population was 436 as of 2010. There are 8 streets.

== Geography ==
Ishlya is located 48 km west of Beloretsk (the district's administrative centre) by road. Kudashmanovo is the nearest rural locality.
