= Kulmas =

Kulmas Кулмас
- Selo
- Location within Bashkortostan Location within Russia
- Coordinates: 54°19′N 57°09′E
- Country: Russia
- Region: Bashkortostan
- District: Beloretsky District
- Time zone: UTC+5:00

Kulmas (Russian: Кулмас; Bashkir: Ҡолмас, Qolmas) is a rural locality (a selo) in Inzersky Selsoviet, Beloretsky District, Bashkortostan, Russia. The population was 18 as of 2010. There is 1 street.

== Geography ==
Kulmas is located 132 km northwest of Beloretsk (the district's administrative centre) by road. Usakly is the nearest rural locality.
