= Umetbayevo, Beloretsky District, Republic of Bashkortostan =

Umetbayevo Уметбаево
- Village
- Location within Bashkortostan Location within Russia
- Coordinates: 53°43′N 57°15′E
- Country: Russia
- Region: Bashkortostan
- District: Beloretsky District
- Time zone: UTC+5:00

Umetbayevo (Russian: Уметбаево; Bashkir: Өмөтбай, Ömötbay) is a rural locality (a village) in Zigazinsky Selsoviet, Beloretsky District, Bashkortostan, Russia. The population was 32 as of 2010. There is 1 street.

== Geography ==
Umetbayevo is located 107 km southwest of Beloretsk (the district's administrative centre) by road. Zigaza is the nearest rural locality.
