= Kumbino =

Kumbino Кумбино
- Selo
- Location within Bashkortostan Location within Russia
- Coordinates: 54°12′N 57°35′E
- Country: Russia
- Region: Bashkortostan
- District: Beloretsky District
- Time zone: UTC+5:00

Kumbino (Russian: Кумбино; Bashkir: Көмбә, Kömbä) is a rural locality (a selo) in Inzersky Selsoviet, Beloretsky District, Bashkortostan, Russia. The population was 49 as of 2010. There are 3 streets.

== Geography ==
Kumbino is located 89 km northwest of Beloretsk (the district's administrative centre) by road. Inzer is the nearest rural locality.
