= Aisovo =

Aisovo Аисово
- Village
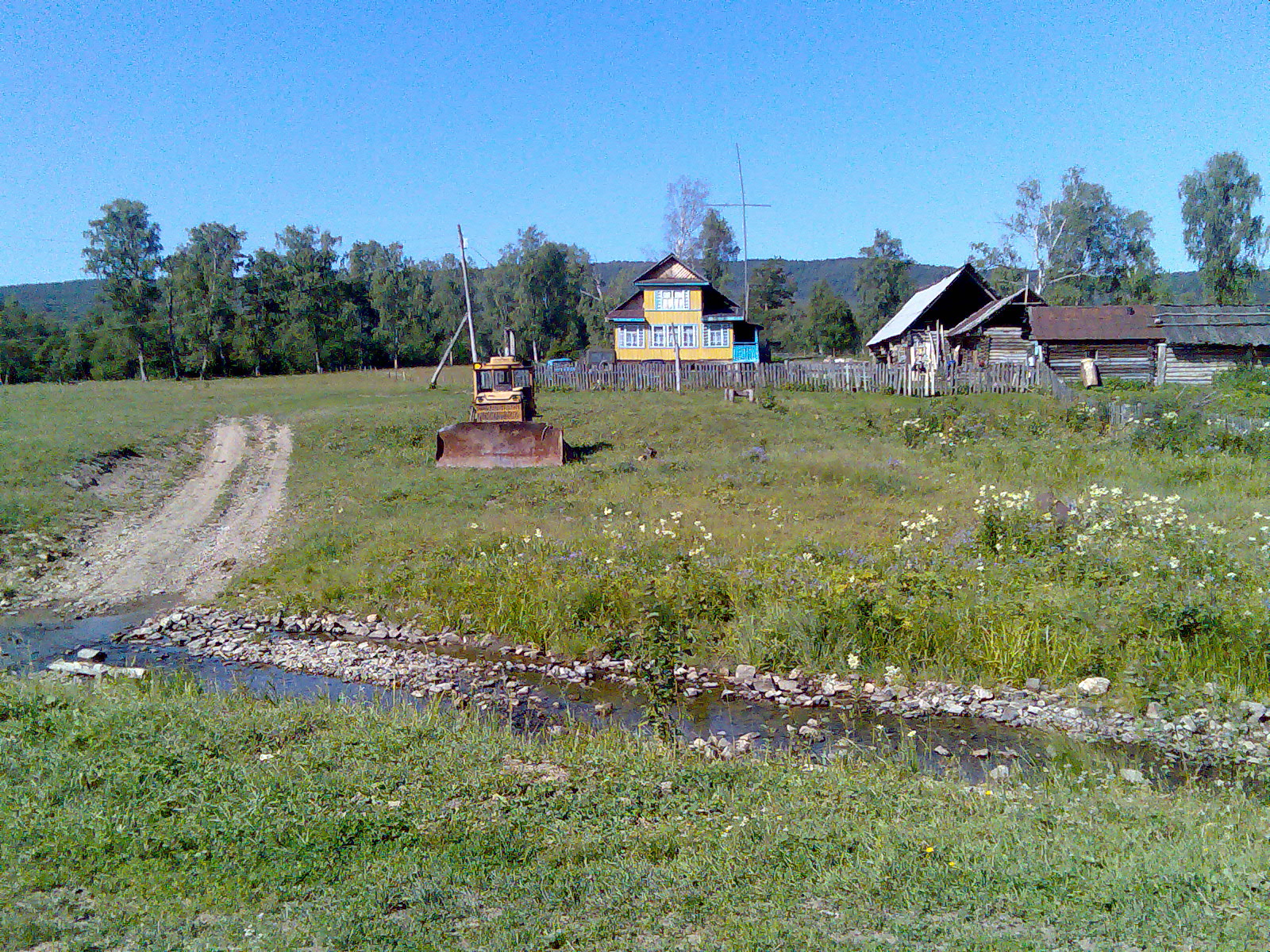
- Aisovo

- Location within Bashkortostan Location within Russia
- Coordinates: 54°04′N 57°18′E
- Country: Russia
- Region: Bashkortostan
- District: Beloretsky District
- Time zone: UTC+5:00

Aisovo (Russian: Аисово; Bashkir: Айыс, Ayıs) is a rural locality (a village) in Inzersky Selsoviet, Beloretsky District, Bashkortostan, Russia. The population was 22 as of 2010. There is one street.

== Geography ==
Aisovo is located 126 km northwest of Beloretsk (the district's administrative centre) by road. Aryshparovo is the nearest rural locality.
