= Safargulovo =

Safargulovo Сафаргулово
- Village
- Location within Bashkortostan Location within Russia
- Coordinates: 54°14′N 57°36′E
- Country: Russia
- Region: Bashkortostan
- District: Beloretsky District
- Time zone: UTC+5:00

Safargulovo (Russian: Сафаргулово; Bashkir: Сәфәрғол, Säfärğol) is a rural locality (a village) in Inzersky Selsoviet, Beloretsky District, Bashkortostan, Russia. The population was 99 as of 2010. There are 2 streets.

== Geography ==
Safargulovo is located 93 km northwest of Beloretsk (the district's administrative centre) by road. Novokasanovo is the nearest rural locality.
