= Nizhnyaya Yatva =

Nizhnyaya Yatva Нижняя Ятва
- Selo
- Location within Bashkortostan Location within Russia
- Coordinates: 53°51′N 58°20′E
- Country: Russia
- Region: Bashkortostan
- District: Beloretsky District
- Time zone: UTC+5:00

Nizhnyaya Yatva (Russian: Нижняя Ятва; Bashkir: Түбәнге Биҡҡужа, Tübänge Biqquja) is a rural locality (a selo) in Sosnovsky Selsoviet, Beloretsky District, Bashkortostan, Russia. The population was 64 as of 2010. There are 3 streets.

== Geography ==
Nizhnyaya Yatva is located 25 km southwest of Beloretsk (the district's administrative centre) by road. Sosnovka is the nearest rural locality.
