= Otnurok (selo) =

Otnurok Отнурок
- Selo
- Location within Bashkortostan Location within Russia
- Coordinates: 54°03′N 58°15′E
- Country: Russia
- Region: Bashkortostan
- District: Beloretsky District
- Time zone: UTC+5:00

Otnurok (Russian: Отнурок; Bashkir: Отнурок) is a rural locality (a selo) and the administrative centre of Nursky Selsoviet, Beloretsky District, Bashkortostan, Russia. The population was 239 as of 2010. There are 12 streets.

== Geography ==
Otnurok is located 23 km northwest of Beloretsk (the district's administrative centre) by road. Otnurok (village) is the nearest rural locality.
