= Chernovka, Republic of Bashkortostan =

Chernovka Черновка
- Village
- Location within Bashkortostan Location within Russia
- Coordinates: 53°58′N 58°17′E
- Country: Russia
- Region: Bashkortostan
- District: Beloretsky District
- Time zone: UTC+5:00

Chernovka (Russian: Черновка) is a rural locality (a village) in Azikeyevsky Selsoviet, Beloretsky District, Bashkortostan, Russia. The population was 126 as of 2010. There are 7 streets.

== Geography ==
Chernovka is located 12 km west of Beloretsk (the district's administrative centre) by road. Beloretsk is the nearest rural locality.
