= Satra, Republic of Bashkortostan =

Satra Сатра
- Village
- Location within Bashkortostan Location within Russia
- Coordinates: 53°55′N 58°03′E
- Country: Russia
- Region: Bashkortostan
- District: Beloretsky District
- Time zone: UTC+5:00

Satra (Russian: Сатра) is a rural locality (a village) in Sermenevsky Selsoviet, Beloretsky District, Bashkortostan, Russia. The population was 19 as of 2010. There is 1 street.

== Geography ==
Satra is located 32 km west of Beloretsk (the district's administrative centre) by road. Yandek is the nearest rural locality.
