= Assy, Beloretsky District, Republic of Bashkortostan =

Assy Ассы
- Selo
- Location within Bashkortostan Location within Russia
- Coordinates: 54°22′N 57°33′E
- Country: Russia
- Region: Bashkortostan
- District: Beloretsky District
- Time zone: UTC+5:00

Assy (Russian: Ассы; Bashkir: Асы, Ası) is a rural locality (a selo) and the administrative centre of Assinsky Selsoviet, Beloretsky District, Bashkortostan, Russia. The population was 818 as of 2010. There are 9 streets.

== Geography ==
Assy is located 117 km northwest of Beloretsk (the district's administrative centre) by road. Brish is the nearest rural locality.
