= Iskushta =

Iskushta Искушта
- Selo
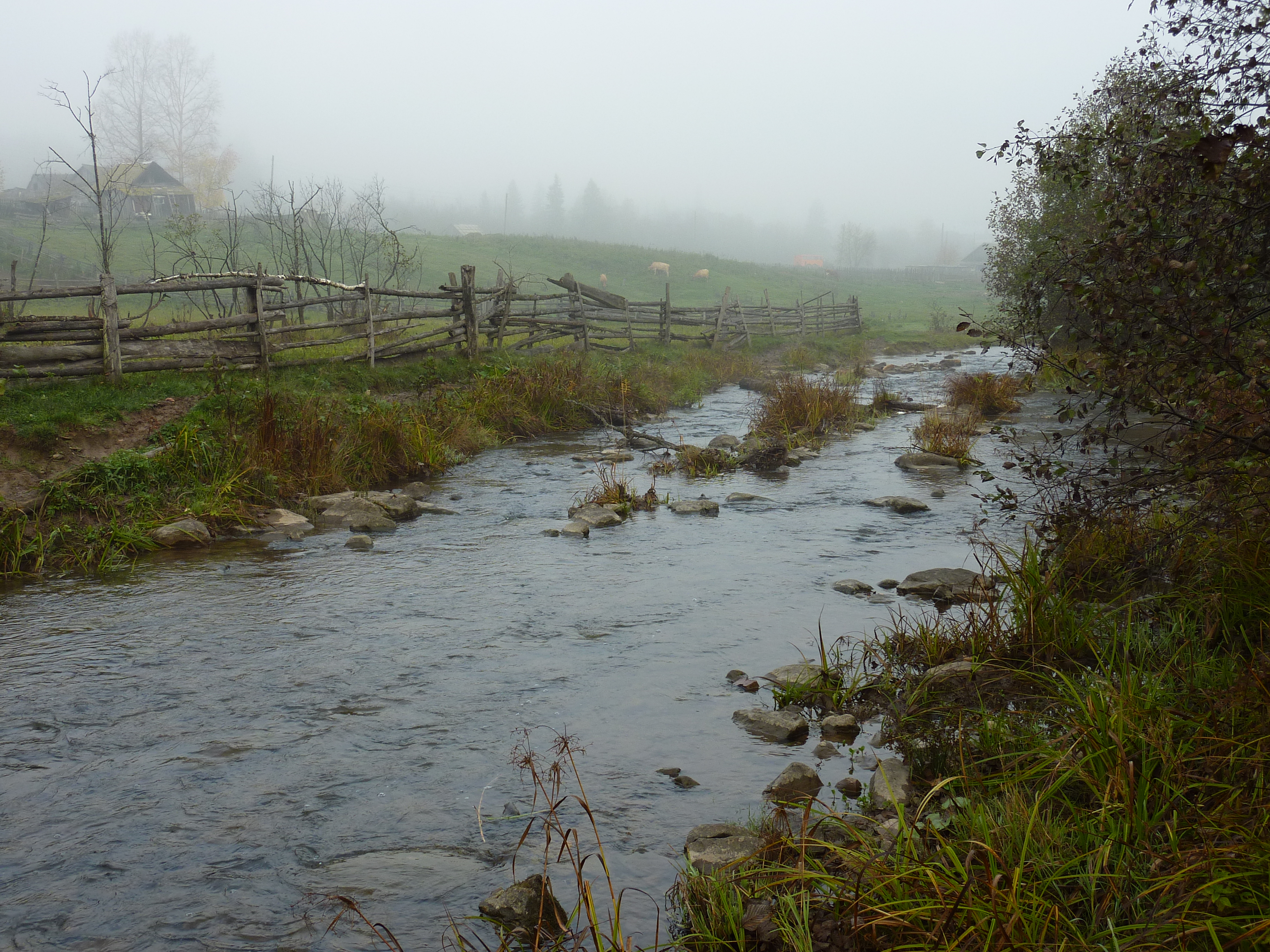
- Rural locality Landscape in Assinsky Selsoviet, Beloretsky District, Bashkortostan, Russia

- Location within Bashkortostan Location within Russia
- Coordinates: 54°32′N 57°35′E
- Country: Russia
- Region: Bashkortostan
- District: Beloretsky District
- Time zone: UTC+5:00

Iskushta (Russian: Искушта; Bashkir: Исҡушты, İsquştı) is a rural locality (a selo) in Assinsky Selsoviet, Beloretsky District, Bashkortostan, Russia. The population was 195 as of 2010. There are 5 streets.

== Geography ==
Iskushta is located 141 km northwest of Beloretsk (the district's administrative centre) by road. Muldakayevo is the nearest rural locality.
