= Khaybullino =

Khaybullino Хайбуллино
- Village
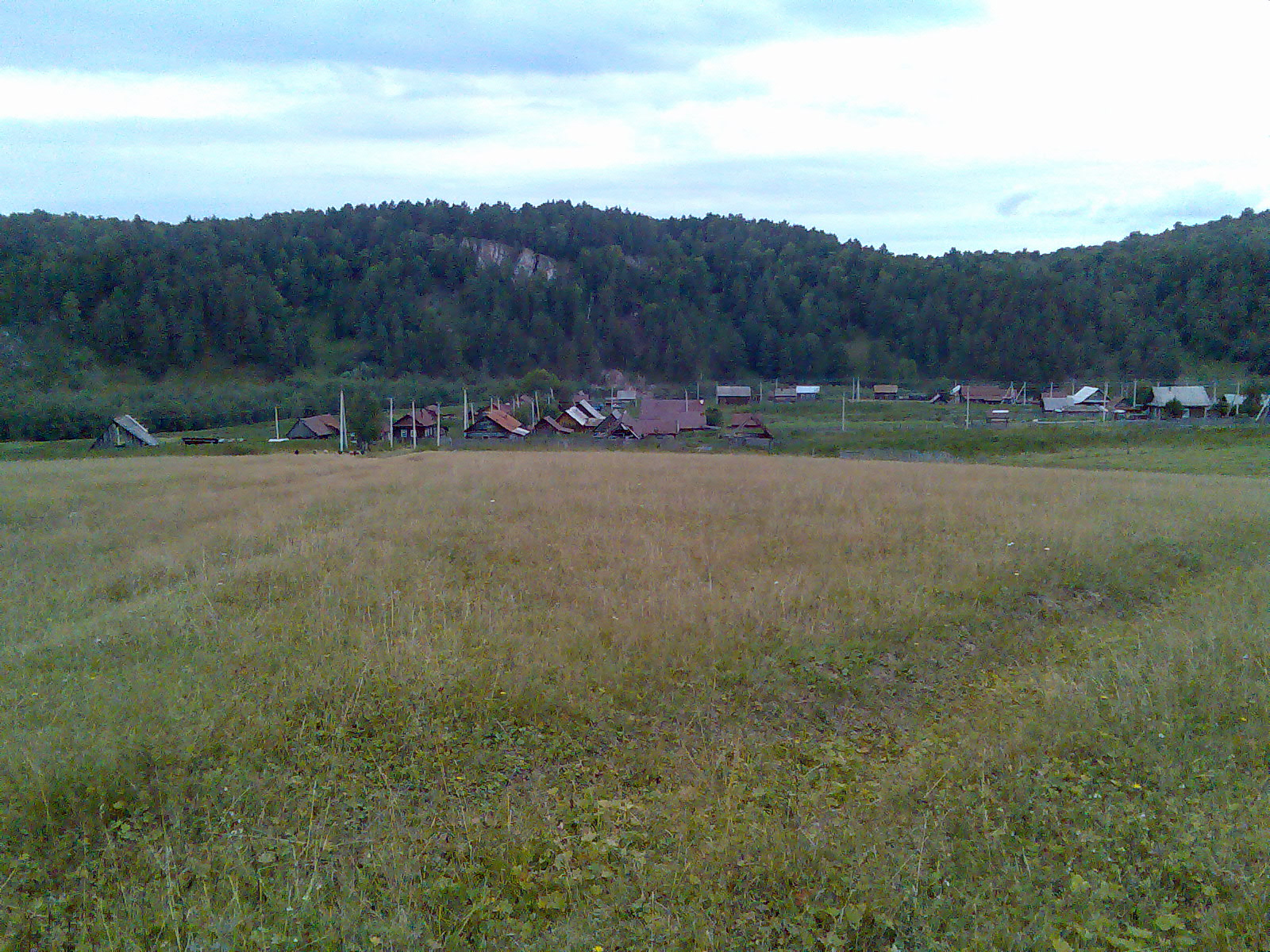

- Location within Bashkortostan Location within Russia
- Coordinates: 53°49′N 57°00′E
- Country: Russia
- Region: Bashkortostan
- District: Beloretsky District
- Time zone: UTC+5:00

Khaybullino (Russian: Хайбуллино; Bashkir: Хәйбулла, Xäybulla) is a rural locality (a village) in Zigazinsky Selsoviet, Beloretsky District, Bashkortostan, Russia. The population was 27 as of 2010. There are 4 streets.

== Geography ==
Khaybullino is located 257 km west of Beloretsk (the district's administrative centre) by road. Bakeyevo is the nearest rural locality.
