= Muldakayevo =

Muldakayevo Мулдакаево
- Selo
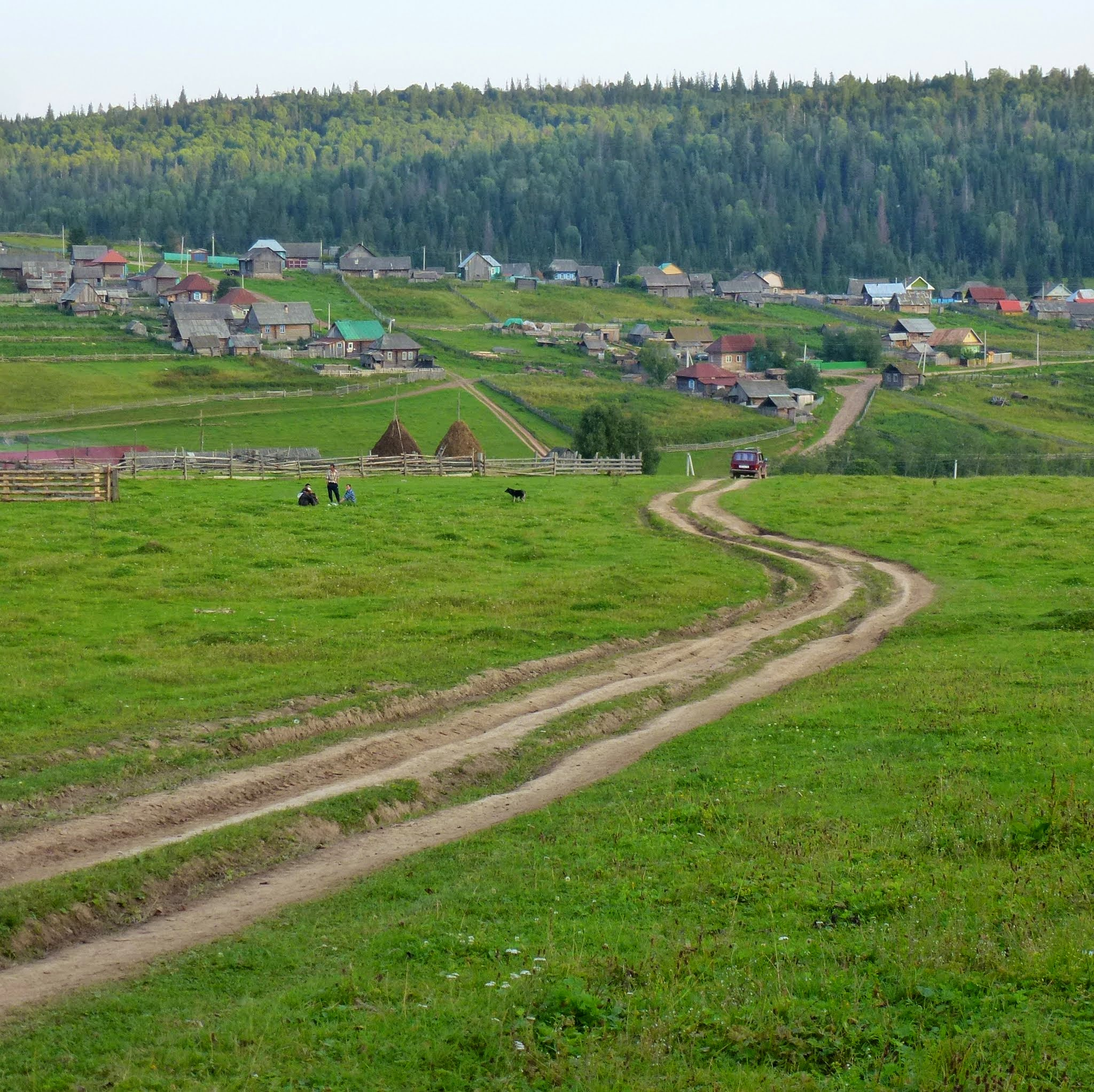
- Muldakaevo, Bashkortostan

- Location within Bashkortostan Location within Russia
- Coordinates: 54°35′N 57°39′E
- Country: Russia
- Region: Bashkortostan
- District: Beloretsky District
- Time zone: UTC+5:00

Muldakayevo (Russian: Мулдакаево; Bashkir: Мулдаҡай, Muldaqay) is a rural locality (a selo) in Assinsky Selsoviet, Beloretsky District, Bashkortostan, Russia. The population was 192 as of 2010. There are 6 streets.

== Geography ==
Muldakayevo is located 150 km northwest of Beloretsk (the district's administrative centre) by road. Iskushta is the nearest rural locality.
