= Nizhny Avzyan =

Nizhny Avzyan Нижний Авзян
- Selo
- Location within Bashkortostan Location within Russia
- Coordinates: 53°29′N 57°35′E
- Country: Russia
- Region: Bashkortostan
- District: Beloretsky District
- Time zone: UTC+5:00

Nizhny Avzyan (Russian: Нижний Авзян; Bashkir: Түбәнге Әүжән, Tübänge Äwjän) is a rural locality (a selo) in Kaginsky Selsoviet, Beloretsky District, Bashkortostan, Russia. The population was 143 as of 2010. There are 6 streets.

== Geography ==
Nizhny Avzyan is located 86 km southwest of Beloretsk (the district's administrative centre) by road. Verkhny Avzyan is the nearest rural locality.
