= Ismakayevo =

Ismakayevo Исмакаево
- Selo
- Location within Bashkortostan Location within Russia
- Coordinates: 53°41′N 57°32′E
- Country: Russia
- Region: Bashkortostan
- District: Beloretsky District
- Time zone: UTC+5:00

Ismakayevo (Russian: Исмакаево; Bashkir: Исмаҡай, İsmaqay) is a rural locality (a selo) in Verkhneavzyansky Selsoviet, Beloretsky District, Bashkortostan, Russia. The population was 273 as of 2010. There are 8 streets.

== Geography ==
Ismakayevo is located 84 km southwest of Beloretsk (the district's administrative centre) by road. Bzyak is the nearest rural locality.
