= Maygashlya =

Maygashlya Майгашля
- Village
- Location within Bashkortostan Location within Russia
- Coordinates: 53°49′N 57°24′E
- Country: Russia
- Region: Bashkortostan
- District: Beloretsky District
- Time zone: UTC+5:00

Maygashlya (Russian: Майгашля; Bashkir: Мәйгәшле, Mäygäşle) is a rural locality (a village) in Tukansky Selsoviet, Beloretsky District, Bashkortostan, Russia. The population was 15 as of 2010. There are 2 streets.

== Geography ==
Maygashlya is located 84 kilometres (52 mi) west of Beloretsk (the district's administrative centre) by road. Komarovo is the nearest rural locality.
