= Karagay-Yurt =

Karagay-Yurt Карагай-Юрт
- Village
- Location within Bashkortostan Location within Russia
- Coordinates: 53°56′N 57°55′E
- Country: Russia
- Region: Bashkortostan
- District: Beloretsky District
- Time zone: UTC+5:00

Karagay-Yurt (Russian: Карагай-Юрт; Bashkir: Ҡарағаййорт, Qarağayyort) is a rural locality (a village) in Ishlinsky Selsoviet, Beloretsky District, Bashkortostan, Russia. The population was 66 as of 2010. There are 3 streets.

== Geography ==
Karagay-Yurt is located 39 km west of Beloretsk (the district's administrative centre) by road. Uluyelga is the nearest rural locality.
