= Rysakayevo =

Rysakayevo Рысакаево
- Selo
- Location within Bashkortostan Location within Russia
- Coordinates: 53°47′N 58°16′E
- Country: Russia
- Region: Bashkortostan
- District: Beloretsky District
- Time zone: UTC+5:00

Rysakayevo (Russian: Рысакаево; Bashkir: Рысыҡай, Rısıqay) is a rural locality (a selo) in Sosnovsky Selsoviet, Beloretsky District, Bashkortostan, Russia. The population was 379 as of 2010. There are 12 streets.

== Geography ==
Rysakayevo is located 26 km southwest of Beloretsk (the district's administrative centre) by road. Utkalevo is the nearest rural locality.
