= Tikhy Klyuch =

Tikhy Klyuch Тихий Ключ
- Village
- Location within Bashkortostan Location within Russia
- Coordinates: 53°57′N 57°50′E
- Country: Russia
- Region: Bashkortostan
- District: Beloretsky District
- Time zone: UTC+5:00

Tikhy Klyuch (Russian: Тихий Ключ) is a rural locality (a village) in Ishlinsky Selsoviet, Beloretsky District, Bashkortostan, Russia. The population was 20 as of 2010. There is 1 street.

== Geography ==
Tikhy Klyuch is located 49 km west of Beloretsk (the district's administrative centre) by road. Kartaly is the nearest rural locality.
