= Khusainovo, Beloretsky District, Republic of Bashkortostan =

Khusainovo Хусаиново
- Village
- Location within Bashkortostan Location within Russia
- Coordinates: 53°43′N 58°14′E
- Country: Russia
- Region: Bashkortostan
- District: Beloretsky District
- Time zone: UTC+5:00

Khusainovo (Russian: Хусаиново; Bashkir: Хөсәйен, Xösäyen) is a rural locality (a village) in Shigayevsky Selsoviet, Beloretsky District, Bashkortostan, Russia. The population was 238 as of 2010. There are 3 streets.

== Geography ==
Khusainovo is located 36 km southwest of Beloretsk (the district's administrative centre) by road. Uzyanbash is the nearest rural locality.
