= Butayevo =

Butayevo Бутаево
- Selo
- Location within Bashkortostan Location within Russia
- Coordinates: 53°49′N 57°17′E
- Country: Russia
- Region: Bashkortostan
- District: Beloretsky District
- Time zone: UTC+5:00

Butayevo (Russian: Бутаево; Bashkir: Ботай, Botay) is a rural locality (a selo) in Zigazinsky Selsoviet, Beloretsky District, Bashkortostan, Russia. The population was 100 as of 2010. There are 3 streets.

== Geography ==
Butayevo is located 95 km southwest of Beloretsk (the district's administrative centre) by road. Zigaza is the nearest rural locality.
