= Chyorny Klyuch =

Chyorny Klyuch Чёрный Ключ
- Selo
- Location within Bashkortostan Location within Russia
- Coordinates: 54°17′N 58°44′E
- Country: Russia
- Region: Bashkortostan
- District: Beloretsky District
- Time zone: UTC+5:00

Chyorny Klyuch (Russian: Чёрный Ключ) is a rural locality (a selo) in Nikolayevsky Selsoviet, Beloretsky District, Bashkortostan, Russia. The population was 29 as of 2010. There is 1 street.

== Geography ==
Chyorny Klyuch is located 43 km northeast of Beloretsk (the district's administrative centre) by road. Makhmutovo is the nearest rural locality.
