= Nizhnyaya Tyulma =

Nizhnyaya Tyulma Нижняя Тюльма
- Village
- Location within Bashkortostan Location within Russia
- Coordinates: 54°17′N 57°36′E
- Country: Russia
- Region: Bashkortostan
- District: Beloretsky District
- Time zone: UTC+5:00

Nizhnyaya Tyulma (Russian: Нижняя Тюльма; Bashkir: Түбәнге Төлмәй, Tübänge Tölmäy) is a rural locality (a village) in Inzersky Selsoviet, Beloretsky District, Bashkortostan, Russia. The population was 65 as of 2010. There are 2 streets.

== Geography ==
Nizhnyaya Tyulma is located 100 km northwest of Beloretsk (the district's administrative centre) by road. Alexandrovka is the nearest rural locality.
