= Komarovo, Republic of Bashkortostan =

Komarovo Комарово
- Village
- Location within Bashkortostan Location within Russia
- Coordinates: 53°48′N 57°23′E
- Country: Russia
- Region: Bashkortostan
- District: Beloretsky District
- Time zone: UTC+5:00

Komarovo (Russian: Комарово) is a rural locality (a village) in Tukansky Selsoviet, Beloretsky District, Bashkortostan, Russia. The population was 10 as of 2010. There are 4 streets.

== Geography ==
Komarovo is located 86 km southwest of Beloretsk (the district's administrative centre) by road. Maygshlya is the nearest rural locality.
