= Arsky Kamen =

Arsky Kamen Арский Камень
- Selo
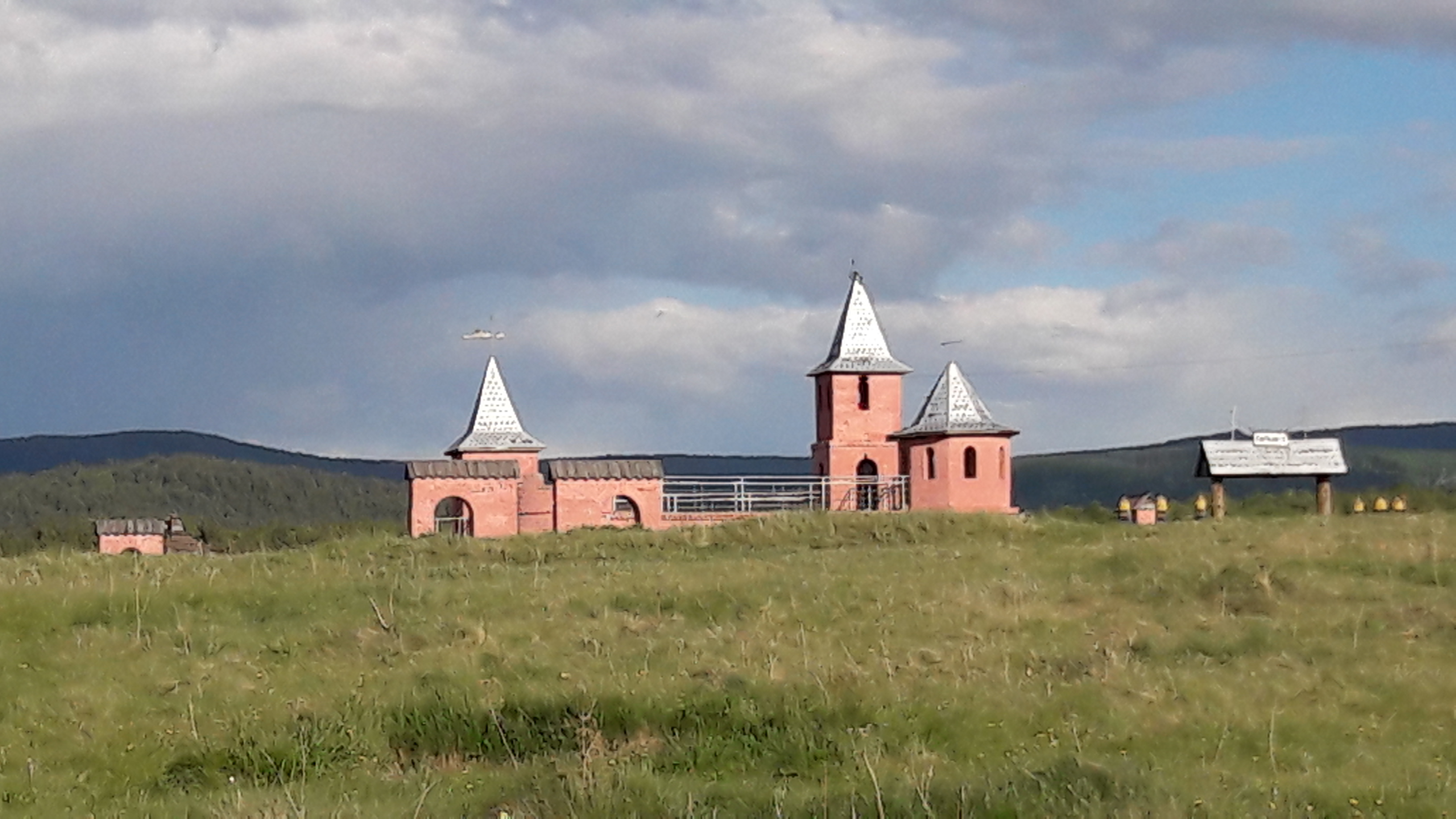

- Location within Bashkortostan Location within Russia
- Coordinates: 53°52′N 58°16′E
- Country: Russia
- Region: Bashkortostan
- District: Beloretsky District
- Time zone: UTC+5:00

Arsky Kamen (Russian: Арский Камень; Bashkir: Ар Ташы, Ar Taşı) is a rural locality (a selo) in Sosnovsky Selsoviet, Beloretsky District, Bashkortostan, Russia. The population was 95 as of 2010. There are 3 streets.

== Geography ==
Arsky Kamen is located 18 km southwest of Beloretsk (the district's administrative centre) by road. Sosnovka is the nearest rural locality.
