= Mukhamet Kharrasov =

Russian physicist (1948–2024)

- Мухамет Харрасов
- Born: 18 September 1948; Sermenevo, Beloretsky District, Bashkir ASSR, Russian SFSR, USSR
- Died: 9 March 2024 (aged 75); Ufa, Bashkortostan, Russia
- Education: Bashkir State University, Moscow State University(Doctorate)
- Known for: physics of superconductivity meterialy, stochastic diffusion processes in dissipative systems, dynamic exchange interactions in condensed matter.
- Awards: Honorary Worker of Higher Professional Education of Russia (2002); Excellence in Ministry of Education (2003); Honored Scientist of the Russian Federation (2008)
- Scientific career
- Fields: Physics
- Workplaces: Moscow State University, Bashkir State University

Mukhamet Hadisovich Kharrasov (Bashkir: Мөхәмәт Хәдис улы Харрасов; Russian: Мухамет Хадисович Харрасов; 18 September 1948 – 9 March 2024) was a Russian physicist, member of the Academy of Sciences of Bashkortostan (2002), Doctor of Physical and Mathematical Sciences (1995), Professor (1996), rector of the Bashkir State University (2000–2010), honored worker of Science Russia (2008) and Bashkortostan (1997), Honored Scientist of the Russian Federation (2008), Honorary Worker of Higher Professional Education of Russia (2002), Excellence in Ministry of Education (2003).

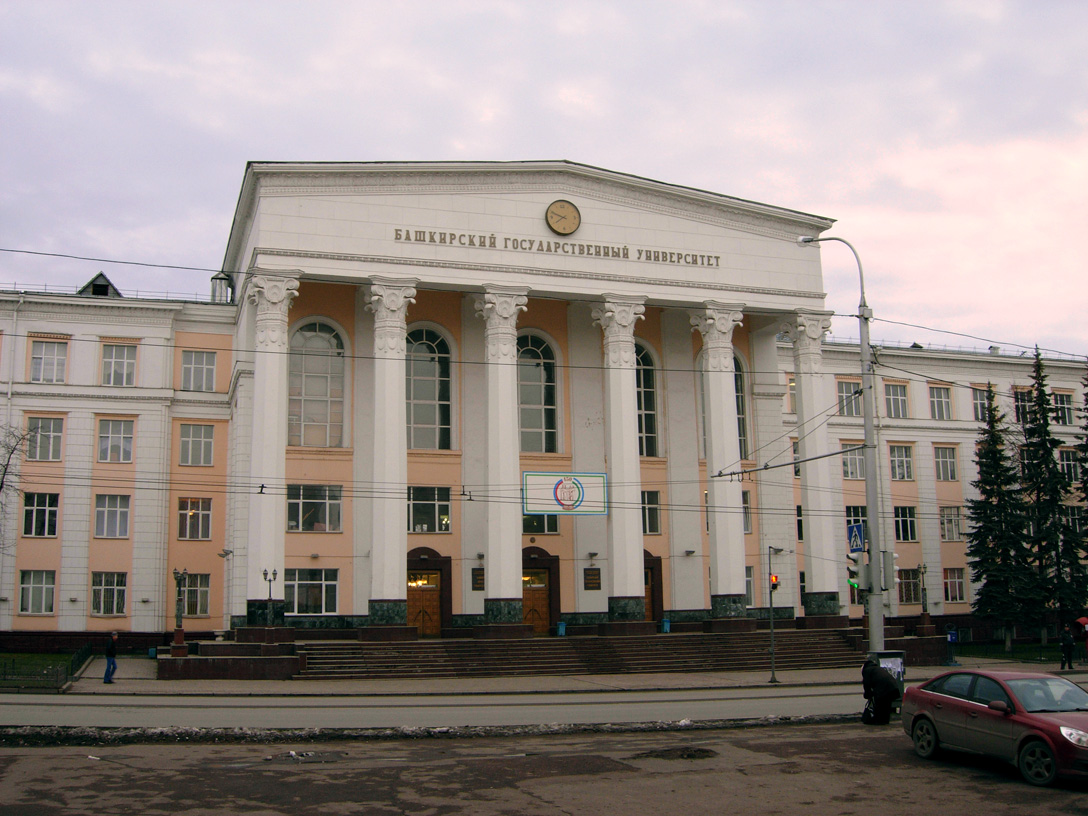
Bashkir State University, led in 2000–2010 by professor Mukhamet Kharrasov

== Biography ==
Kharrasov was born on 18 September 1948, in the Sermenevo village, Beloretsky District, Bashkir Autonomous Soviet Socialist Republic, USSR (modern-day Bashkortostan, Russia).

In 1971, he graduated from Kharrasov Department of Physics, Bashkir State University, where he continued to work as assistant in the Department of Theoretical and Experimental Physics, from 1972 to 1975. From 1975 to 1991, he rose through the ranks of graduate student, assistant professor, senior lecturer, and finally associate professor of BSU.

From 1980 to 1984, he worked as a teacher in Algeria for a business trip.

From 1991 to 1994, he studied at the Moscow State University for his doctorate. Subject protected at MSU doctoral dissertation, "The asymptotic methods hierarchy in some models of dynamic systems" From 1994 to 1999, Mukhamet Hadisovich - Associate Professor, Professor, Dean of the Faculty of Physics of BSU.

From 1999 to 2000, he worked as the deputy, the acting chairman of the State Committee on Science of the Republic of Bashkortostan, higher and secondary vocational education.

17 January 2000, he was elected rector of the Bashkir State University.

Until the spring of 2010, he worked as the rector of the Bashkir State University.

The deputy of the State Assembly of Bashkortostan.

A member of the political party United Russia.

Research interests: the physics of superconductivity meterially; stochastic diffusion processes in dissipative systems, dynamic exchange interactions in condensed matter. He developed the theory of dynamical exchange interactions in condensed matter systems installed mathematical correlations in a system with broken symmetry.

Mukhamet Kharrasov died on 9 March 2024, at the age of 75.

== Proceedings ==
Kharrasov Mukhamet Hadisovich - author of over 100 scientific publications.

- «Асимптотическое поведение решений уравнения Фоккера-Планка при t ®» Доклады Академии наук. 1992. Т. 325. С. 280–283.

Высокотемпературная сверхпроводимость магнитокерамических систем. Уфа: Китап, 1997 (соавтор).

- Садовников Б. И., Харрасов М. Х. «Неравенства Н. Н. Боголюбова в равновесной статистической механике» // ДАН СССР. 1974. Т. 216. No. 3. С. 513–516.
- Харрасов М. Х. «О предельных соотношениях для корреляционных функций» // ДАН СССР. 1976. Т. 230. No. 4. С. 826–829.
- Алексеев В. В. Харрасов М. Х. «Об асимптотике решений уравнения Фоккера-Планка при больших значениях времени» // ТФМ. 1993. Т. 97. No. 1. С. 113–120.
- Харрасов М. Х. «Эволюция простой динамической системы в случайном поле» // ТФМ. 1993. Т. 93. No. 3. С. 414–419.
- Садовников Б. И., Харрасов М. Х. «Метод самосогласованного поля Н. Н. Боголюбова в статистической механике» // ДАН. 1994. Т. 339. No. 4. С. 472–476.
- Савченко М. А., Стефанович А. В., Харрасов М. Х. «Высокотемпературная сверхпроводимость магнитокерамических систем». Уфа: Китап, 1997. — 176 с.
