= Bakeyevo, Beloretsky District, Republic of Bashkortostan =

Bakeyevo Бакеево
- Selo
- Location within Bashkortostan Location within Russia
- Coordinates: 53°49′N 57°04′E
- Country: Russia
- Region: Bashkortostan
- District: Beloretsky District
- Time zone: UTC+5:00

Bakeyevo (Russian: Бакеево; Bashkir: Баҡый, Baqıy) is a rural locality (a selo) in Zigazinsky Selsoviet, Beloretsky District, Bashkortostan, Russia. The population was 73 as of 2010. There is 1 street.

== Geography ==
Bakeyevo is located 266 km west of Beloretsk (the district's administrative centre) by road. Khaybullino is the nearest rural locality.
