= Bakeyevo, Sterlibashevsky District, Republic of Bashkortostan =

Bakeyevo Бакеево
- Selo
- Location within Bashkortostan Location within Russia
- Coordinates: 53°21′N 55°21′E
- Country: Russia
- Region: Bashkortostan
- District: Sterlibashevsky District
- Time zone: UTC+5:00

Bakeyevo (Russian: Бакеево; Bashkir: Баҡый, Baqıy) is a rural locality (a selo) and the administrative centre of Bakeyevsky Selsoviet, Sterlibashevsky District, Bashkortostan, Russia. The population was 507 as of 2010. There are 6 streets.

== Geography ==
Bakeyevo is located 13 km southeast of Sterlibashevo (the district's administrative centre) by road. Novonikolayevka is the nearest rural locality.
