= Beloretsky District =

Beloretsky District Белорецкий район (Russian)
- District

Other transcription(s)
  - Bashkir: Белорет районы
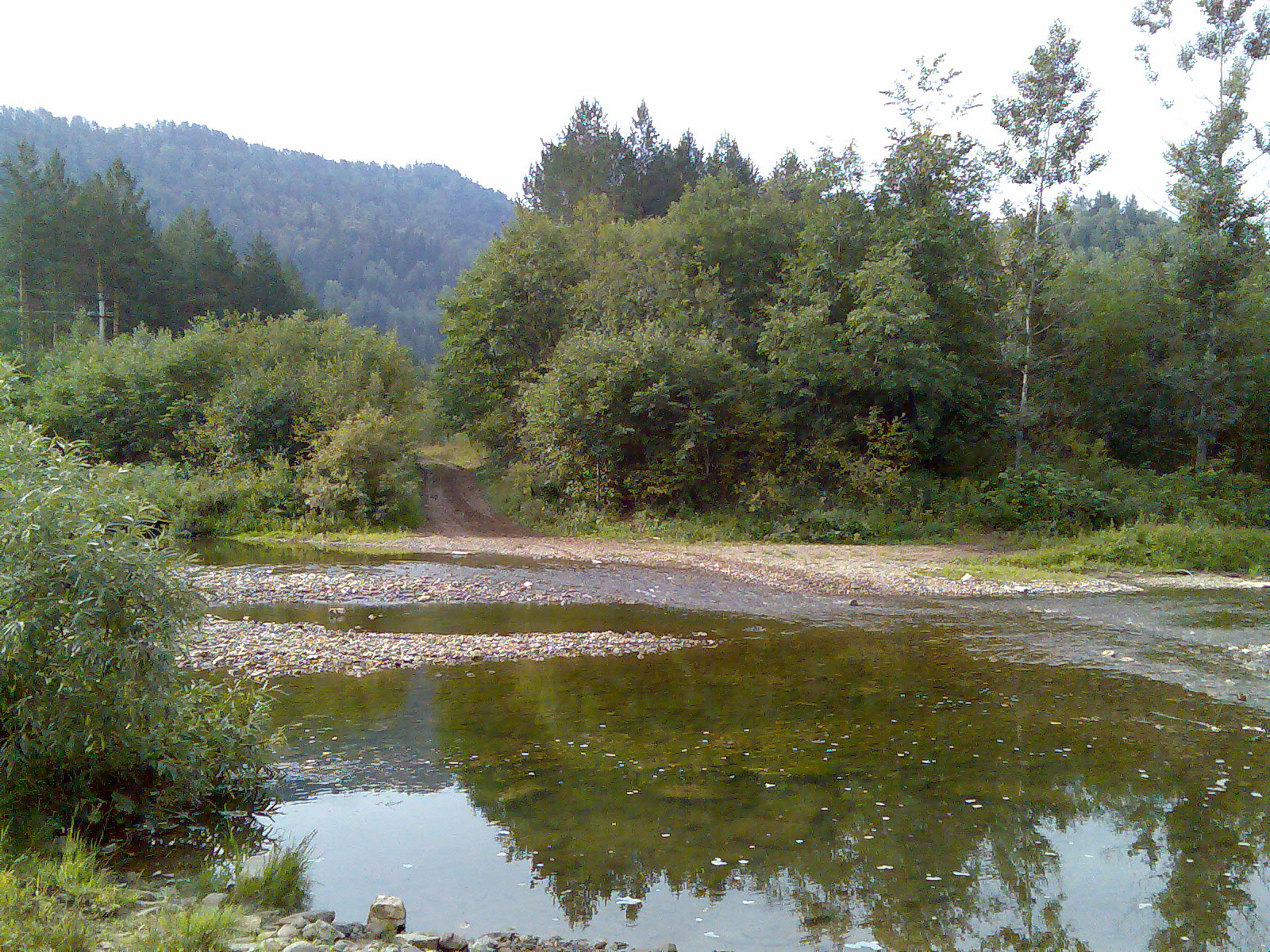
- The Bolshoy Shishenyak River near the selo of Bakeyevo in Beloretsky District

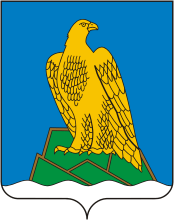
- Flag Coat of arms
- Location of Beloretsky District in the Republic of Bashkortostan
- Coordinates: 53°50′N 58°36′E
- Country: Russia
- Federal subject: Republic of Bashkortostan
- Established: 1930
- Administrative center: Beloretsk

Area
  - Total: 11,302.58 km^{2} (4,363.95 sq mi)

Population (2010 Census)
  - Total: 38,442
  - Density: 3.4012/km^{2} (8.8090/sq mi)
  - Urban: 0%
  - Rural: 100%

Administrative structure
  - Administrative divisions: 19 Selsoviets
  - Inhabited localities: 99 rural localities

Municipal structure
  - Municipally incorporated as: Beloretsky Municipal District
  - Municipal divisions: 1 urban settlements, 19 rural settlements
- Time zone: UTC+5 (MSK+2)
- OKTMO ID: 80611000
- Website: http://beladmin.ru

Population of Beloretsky District
- 2010 Census: 38,442
- 2002 Census: 29,087
- 1989 Census: 34,818
- 1979 Census: 35,834

Beloretsky District (Russian: Белоре́цкий райо́н; Bashkir: Белорет районы, Beloret rayonı) is an administrative and municipal district (raion), one of the fifty-four in the Republic of Bashkortostan, Russia. It is located in the east of the republic and borders with Chelyabinsk Oblast in the north, Uchalinsky District in the east, Abzelilovsky District in the southeast, Burzyansky District in the south, Ishimbaysky District in the southwest, and with Gafuriysky and Arkhangelsky Districts in the west. The area of the district is 11,302.58 square kilometers (4,363.95 sq mi). Its administrative center is the town of Beloretsk (which is not administratively a part of the district). As of the 2010 Census, the total population of the district was 38,442.

== History ==
The district was established in 1930.

== Administrative and municipal status ==
Within the framework of administrative divisions, Beloretsky District is one of the fifty-four in the Republic of Bashkortostan. It is divided into nineteen selsoviets, comprising ninety-nine rural localities. The town of Beloretsk serves as its administrative center, despite being incorporated separately as a town of republic significance—an administrative unit with the status equal to that of the districts.

As a municipal division, the district is incorporated as Beloretsky Municipal District, with the town of republic significance of Beloretsk being incorporated within it as Beloretsk Urban Settlement. Its nineteen selsoviets are incorporated as nineteen rural settlements within the municipal district. The town of Beloretsk serves as the administrative center of the municipal district as well.

== Notable people ==
- Mukhamet Kharrasov (b. 1948), former President of the Bashkir State University
