= Beloretsk =

Town in Bashkortostan, Russia

Beloretsk Белорецк
- Town

Other transcription(s)
  - Bashkir: Белорет
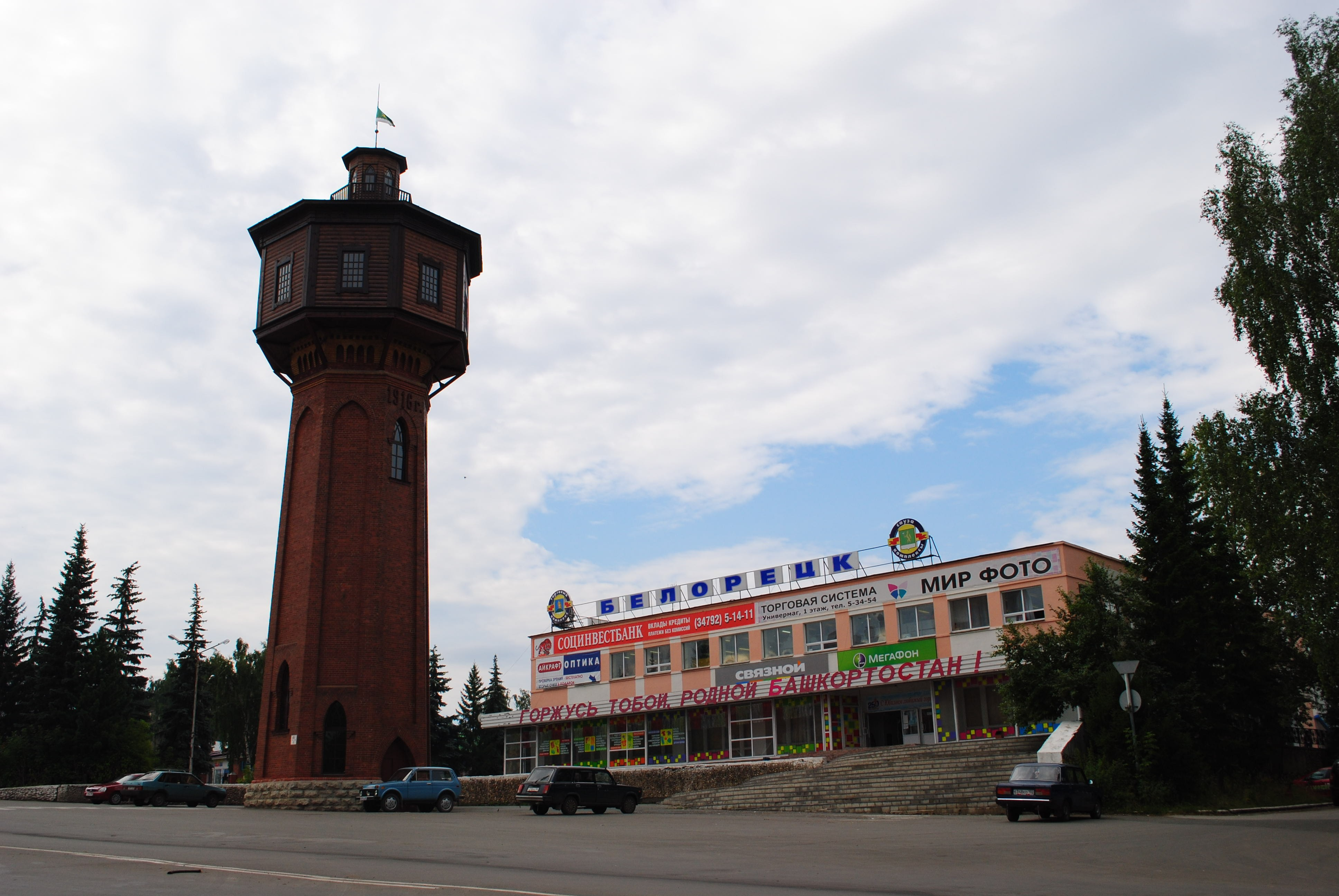
- Beloretsk water tower

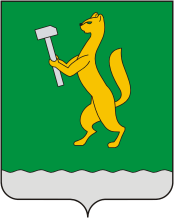
- Flag Coat of arms
- Interactive map of Beloretsk
- Location of Beloretsk Beloretsk (Bashkortostan)
- Coordinates: 53°58′N 58°24′E
- Country: Russia
- Federal subject: Bashkortostan
- Founded: 1762
- Town status since: 1923
- Elevation: 500 m (1,600 ft)

Population (2010 Census)
  - Total: 68,806
  - Estimate (2025): 62,742 (−8.8%)

Administrative status
  - Subordinated to: town of republic significance of Beloretsk
  - Capital of: Beloretsky District, town of republic significance of Beloretsk

Municipal status
  - Municipal district: Beloretsky Municipal District
  - Urban settlement: Beloretsk Urban Settlement
  - Capital of: Beloretsky Municipal District, Beloretsk Urban Settlement
- Time zone: UTC+5 (MSK+2)
- Postal code: 453500
- OKTMO ID: 80611101001

Beloretsk (Russian: Белоре́цк; Bashkir: Белорет, romanized: Beloret) is a town in the Republic of Bashkortostan, Russia, located on the Belaya River, 245 kilometers (152 mi) from Ufa. Population: 68,806 (2010 census); 71,093 (2002 census); 72,434 (1989 Soviet census).

== History ==
Beloretsk Iron Factory was founded in 1762 by merchants I. B. Tverdyshev and I. S. Myasnikov, who bought 170,041 desiatinas of land from Bashkirs of Belokatayskaya Volost.

== Administrative and municipal status ==
Within the framework of administrative divisions, Beloretsk serves as the administrative center of Beloretsky District, even though it is not a part of it. As an administrative division, it is incorporated separately as the town of republic significance of Beloretsk—an administrative unit with the status equal to that of the districts. As a municipal division, the town of republic significance of Beloretsk is incorporated within Beloretsky Municipal District as Beloretsk Urban Settlement.

== Religion ==
Several religious denominations are active in Beloretsk. The biggest community of believers is the Orthodox Christians, with the Muslim community being the second largest.

== Politics ==
Covered by the Beloretsk constituency for elections to the State Duma.
