= Baryi Kalimullin =

Russian architect (1907–1989)

- Russian: Барый Гибатович Калимуллин; Bashkir: Барый Ғибәт улы Кәлимуллин
- Born: April 10, 1907; Duvan-Mechetlino, Zlatoustovskiy uezd, Ufa Governorate, Russian Empire
- Died: July 21, 1989 (aged 82); Ufa, Bashkir ASSR, Russian SFSR, Soviet Union
- Education: Novosibirsk State University of Architecture and Civil Engineering, 1930-1935
- Occupation: Architect
- Awards: Order of the Red Banner of Labour
- Buildings: Main building of Bashkir State University, main building of Ufa State Aviation Technical University, third building of Bashkir State pedagogical University
- Projects: General plans of Sterlitamak (1942—1946), Baymak (1940), Ishimbay (1939), Beloretsk (1939)

Baryi Gibatovich Kalimullin (Russian: Барый Гибатович Калимуллин, Bashkir: Барый Ғибәт улы Кәлимуллин; April 10, 1907 – July 21, 1989) was a Soviet architect, educator, and social activist. He is credited with helping to build Ufa Aviation University and Bashkir State University.

In 1935-51 Head of sector of urban planning in the trust "Bashprogor" (now institute Bashkirgrazhdanproekt).

In 1951-1963 Senior Research Fellow, Institute of History, Language and Literature BF USSR.

Since 1966 Head of the Department of Architecture at the Kazan State University of Architecture and Engineering.

In 1971-87 at the Ufa Oil Institute, where he initiated at the Faculty of Civil Engineering in 1977 and opened a specialty "Architecture".

== Creation ==
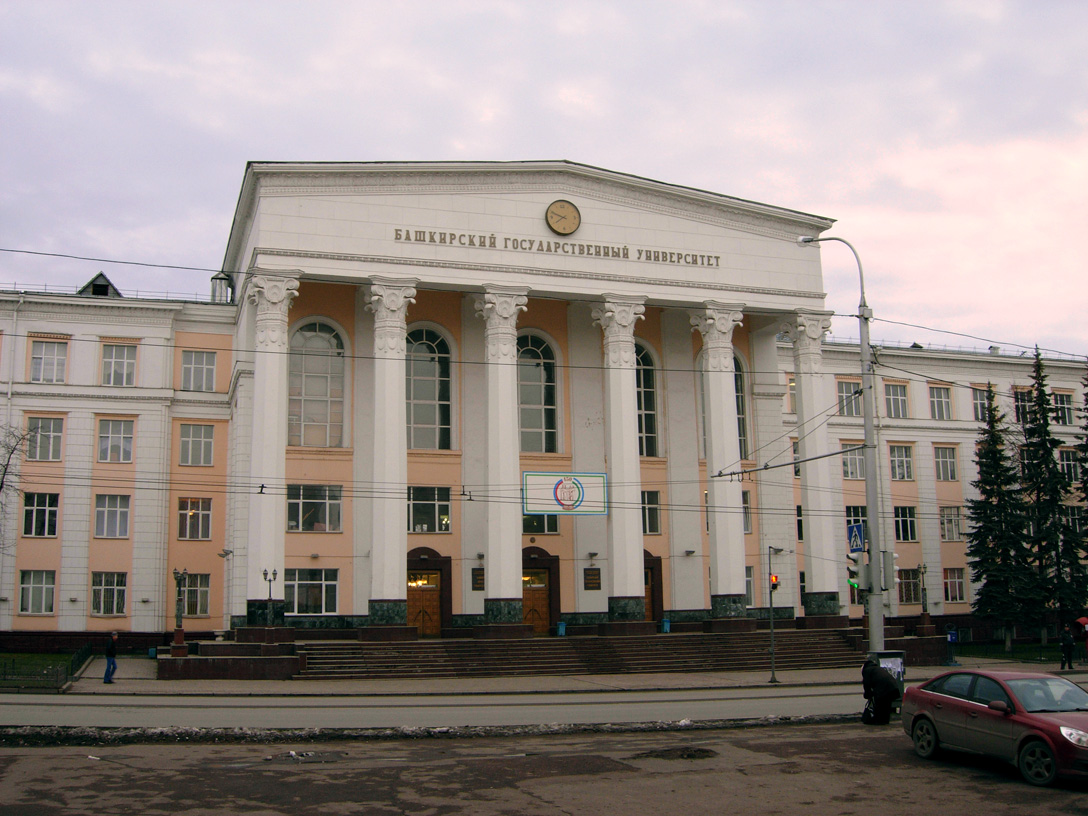
Baryi Kallimullin's project, the main building of Bashkir State University

Kalimullin was a founder of scientific research in the field of urban development in the country, Bashkir folk architecture, planning villages. He was one of the organizers and the first president of the Union of Architects of the Republic of Bashkortostan, leading the group for about 30 years.

His research interests included urban planning, architecture, history of the region, art. He published a total of ten monographs, including "Landmarks Bashkiria", "City Salavat", "Caravanserai Orenburg", "City Sterlitamak" (planning and development), "Issues of planning and development of Ufa", "Planning and construction Bashkir villages", and "Bashkir folk architecture".

== Awards ==
- 1947 – Honored Artist of the Bashkir ASSR
- 1949 – Order of the Red Banner of Labour
- 1957 – Corresponding member of the Academy of Construction and Architecture of the USSR
- 1976 – Professor, Doctor of Art History, Honored Architect of the RSFSR
- Doctor of Science, member of the Union of Architects of the USSR
- Certificate of Honour of the Presidium of the Supreme Council of the Bashkir ASSR
