= Galeyev =

Galeyev is a surname. Notable people with the surname include:

- Rinat Galeyev (1939–2007), Russian businessman
- Salavat Galeyev (born 1958), Russian footballer and coach
- Vadim Galeyev (born 1992), Kazakh cyclist

== See also ==
- Ganeyev
