= Ufa State Petroleum Technological University =

Technical university in Ufa, Russia

Coordinates: 54.8185°N 56.0585°E

University rankings

Regional – Overall
- QS Emerging Europe and Central Asia: 251-300 (2022)

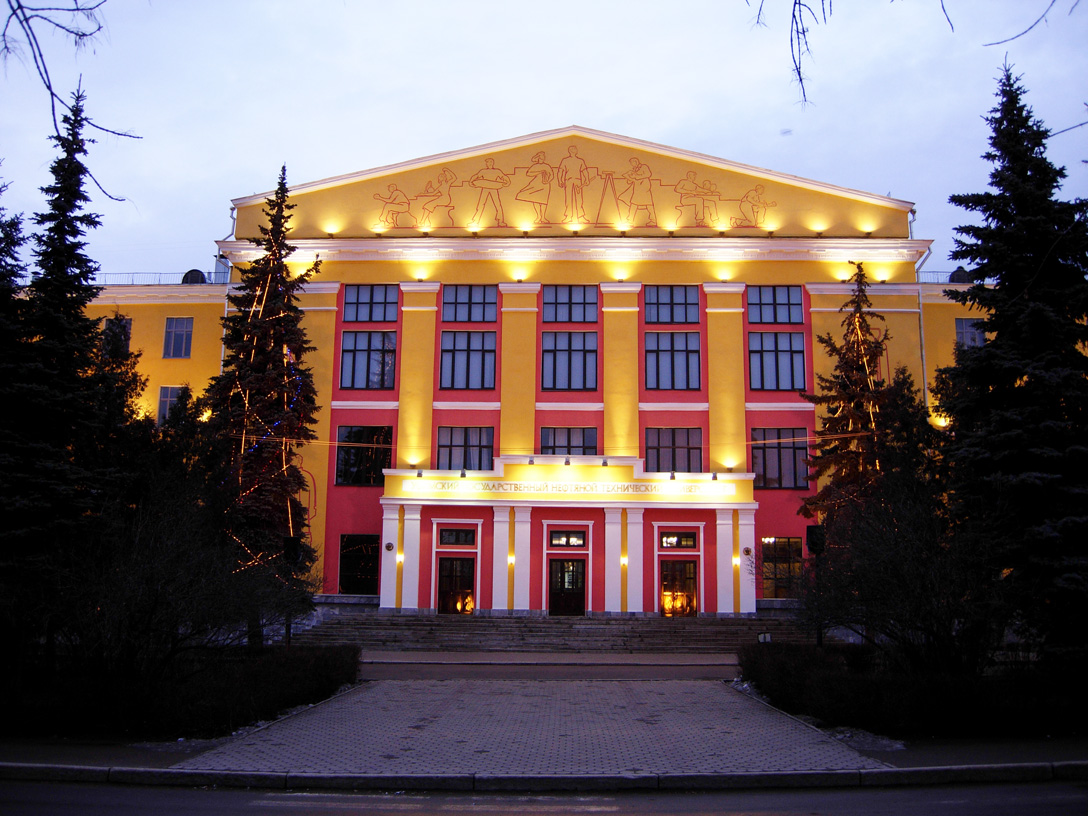
Ufa State Petroleum Technological University

Ufa State Petroleum Technological University (Russian: Уфимский Государственный Нефтяной Технический Университет, УГНТУ, Bashkir: Өфө дәүләт нефть техник университеты, romanized: Öfö däwlät neft' texnik universitetı) is a technical university in the city of Ufa.

In October 1941, Gubkin Russian State University of Oil and Gas was relocated from Moscow to Ufa. However, in November 1943 the Gubkin University was returned to Moscow. On 4 October 1948, the Ufa Petroleum Institute emerged on the basis of Gubkin Russian State University of Oil and Gas. On 22 November 1993, Ufa Petroleum Institute was renamed to Ufa State Petroleum Technological University.

== Faculties ==
- Faculty of Automation of Production Processes
- Faculty of Mining and Petroleum
- Faculty of Mechanics
- Institute of Economics (Institute of oil and gas business)
- Faculty of Pipelines
- Faculty of Humanities
- Faculty of Technology
- Faculty of Architecture and Civil Engineering

== Branches ==
There are 3 branches of the USPTU in the Republic of Bashkortostan: in Oktyabrsky, Salavat and Sterlitamak.

== Notable alumni ==
- Murtaza Rakhimov - Former president of the Republic of Bashkortostan, Russia.
- Sergei Bogdanchikov - a Russian manager, president of Rosneft.
- Alexander Ananenkov - Deputy Chairman of the Board of Gazprom.
- Farid Mukhametshin - Chairman of the State Council of the Republic of Tatarstan, former president of the Republic of Tatarstan.

== Notable professors ==
- Baryi Kalimullin was a Russian architect, educator, and social activist. He is credited with helping to build Ufa Aviation University and Bashkir State University.
- Rustem R. Vakhitov, Russian philosopher, publicist, writer
