= Rozalia Sultangareeva =

Bashkir folklorist, folk singer, scientist (born 1955)

Rozalia Sultangareeva (Розалиә Солтангәрәева) (March 28, 1955-) is a Bashkir folklorist, scholar, professor, folk singer and director of the Research Center of Bashkir Folklore.

== Biography ==
Sultangareeva was born on March 28, 1955, in the village of Novosepyashevo, Alsheyevsky District of Bashkortostan. Her parents were teachers. From the folk singer A. M. Usmanova (1930-2015) she recorded an authentic version of the Bashkir epic "Ural-batyr" in a melodious performance.

In 2003 the scientist received her Doctorate in Philology, having presented her thesis "Family and household ritual folklore of the Bashkir people” (Moscow, 2003).

Sultangareeva explores ritual, game, choreographic, storytelling, epic, religious folklore, also mythology, healing practices of the Bashkirs.

She actively participated in the preparation for publication of the book series "Bashkir Folk Art" ("Bashkort Halyk Izhadi"), the encyclopedia "Bashkortostan" and other books with Akhmet Suleymanov, Fanuza Nadrshina, Nur Zaripov and other scientists together.

In 2010-2017 she was the chairman of the public organization "Society of Bashkir Women" of the Republic of Bashkortostan. (p. 134-138)

== Awards ==
- Order of Salawat Yulaev (2005) (State award certificate Б №0119, УП-114, 01.04. 2005)
- Akmullah Literary Prize [https://miyaki.bashkortostan.ru/activity/25109/ Akmullah Literature Prize. Rozalia Sultangareeva (20.12.1991)

== See also ==
- M.Akmullah Bashkir State Pedagogical University
- Novosepyashevo
- ru:Башкирское народное творчество (книжная серия)

== Main works ==
- Султангареева Р. А. Башкирский свадебно-обрядовый фольклор / УНЦ РАН.— Уфа, 1994.—191 с.
- Султангареева Р. А. Башҡорт халыҡ бейеүе. — Өфө, 2009. — 130 с. (в сосост. с Г. В. Баймырзиной)
- Солтангәрәева Р. Ә. Башҡорт халыҡ ижады. Йола фольклоры. — Төҙ., инеш һүҙ, аңл. авт-ры Ә. Сөләймәнов, Р. Солтангәрәева. — Өфө, 1995. — 475-се бит.
- Солтангәрәева Р. Ә. Башҡорт халыҡ йола уйындары.(башһүҙ авт.-ры) . Башкирские народные обрядовые игры (в сосост с А.М,Сулеймановым Уфа, 1997.
- Султангареева Р. А. Семейно-бытовой обрядовый фольклор башкирского народа. — Уфа: Гилем, 1998. — 243 с.
- Солтангәрәева Р.Ө,Хәтер көйө. Автор үҙе яҙып алған башҡорт халыҡ йырҙары.Өс аудиокассета менән.. -(Мелодии памяти народа. Сборник песен, записанных Р. А. Султангареевой от народаи в собственном исполнении с тремя аудиокассетами).-Өфө, 2003,78б
- Султангареева Р. А. Жизнь человека в обряде: фольклорно-этнографическое исследование башкирских семейных обрядов. — Уфа: Гилем, 2005 . — 344 с.
- Султангареева Р. А. Башкирский народный курэш. — Уфа: Китап, 2009. — 144 с.
- Ғәйнә башҡорттары фольклоры / Авт.-төҙ. Р.Ә. Солтангәрәева, төҙ. Ф. Ф. Ғайсина. Баш һүҙ авт. Р.Ә. Солтангәрәева. — Өфө: БР ФА, «Ғилем» нәшриәте, 2012. — 172 б.
- Султангареева Р. А. Танцевальный фольклор башкир. — Уфа: Гилем, Башк. энцикл., 2013. — 128 с.
- Султангареева, Р. А. Йола — система и нормы жизневедения башкир / Р. А. Султангареева. — Уфа : Китап, 2015. — 216 с.
- Султангареева Р. А. Школа башкирского сказительства(Башҡорт сәсән мәктәбе).-Уфа,2012.282с
- Султангареева Р. А. Башкирский фольклор: семантика, функции и традиции.т1.- Миф. Обряд. Танец. Сказительство. Шаманский, религиозный, музыкальный фольклор. Современные традиции. — Уфа: Башк. Энцикл., 2018. — 520 с.
- Султангареева Р. А. Башкирское народное творчество Обрядовый фольклор .т12.(Сост. авт.вступ ст. и коммент. Р. А. Султангареева, А. М. Сулейманов .-Уфа, Китап.2010, 556с

== Songs ==
- Песни- кубаиры в исполнении Р.Султангареевой

== External literature ==
- Басангова Т. Г. Ученый и сказитель Р. А. Султангареева.//Вестник Северо-Восточного федерального университета им М. К. Аммосова2020 No. 2(18), с 171—173
- Карпухин И. Е. Свой материал, свой подход, своя концепция.//Бельские просторы 2007

== Links ==
- Bashkir epos “Ural-Batyr” sounded in Kazakhstan. Information agency Bashinform. 27 MARCH 2012
- World of encyclopedias. encyclopedia.ru
- International conference, devoted to the 100th anniversary of the epos “URAL-BATYR” record, is held in Ufa. Bashinform. 30 NOVEMBER 2010
- Scientists RB have taken part in the all-Russian congress of folklore scientists. Bashinform. 12 FEBRUARY 2010
- Встреча студентов Уфимского университета науки и технологий с Розалией Султангареевой
- Газета "Республика Башкортостан". 22.08.2012. Р.Султангареева. Пение сэсэна- это плетение нитей между нациями
- Р.Султангареева. Жизнь человека в обряде
- Научное обозрение Саяно-Алтая. Международный редакционный совет
- Министерство сельского хозяства Республики Башкортостан. Урал-батыр байрамы
- В республике состоялся межрегиональный фольклорный праздник "Башкиры берегов Уфы"
- Прошел Региональный конкурс "Я зову вас, сэсэны!"
- Журнал Acto Polono-Rutenica.2018-03-30.Р.Султангареева. Этнолингвистические и типологические параллели в фольклорном творчестве народов (на материале свадебно-обрядовых песен башкир)
- О конференции "Тенгрианство и эпическое наследие народов Евразии" 2019 в Бишкеке
