= Vakhitov =

Vakhitov is a surname. Notable people with the surname include:

- Mullanur Waxitov (1885–1918), Tatar revolutionary
- Airat Vakhitov, Guantanamo prisoner
- Rustem R. Vakhitov, Russian philosopher, publicist, writer
