= Rustem R. Vakhitov =

- Born: October 16, 1970; Ufa
- Education: Bashkir State University, Herzen University
- Occupations: Political writer, writer, philosopher, opinion writer, social philosopher
- Employers: Bashkortostan Academy of Sciences; Bashkir State University; Central Committee of the Communist Party of the Russian Federation; Sovetskaya Rossiya; Ufa State Petroleum Technological University; Ufa University of Science and Technology
- Awards: Eurasian Philosophy Prize (2025)

Rustem Rinatovich Vakhitov (Russian: Рустем Ринатович Вахитов; born 1970) is a Russian philosopher, publicist, writer, and candidate of philosophical sciences. He is a columnist for the newspaper Sovetskaya Rossiya, and is a member of the Union of Writers of Russia. He is a researcher of Eurasianism. And he himself belongs to this line of thought (to the left-wing).

He is a laureate of the Eurasian Philosophy Prize (2025).

== Life and career ==
Rustem was born on the outskirts of Ufa. His mother is Tatar. And he himself is also one-quarter Bashkir. His grandfather was awarded the medal "For the Defense of Leningrad".

Rustem Vakhitov studied at a Russian school, and graduated from the Physics Faculty of Bashkir State University in 1993. From 2009 to 2012, he studied for a doctorate at the Herzen University. His dissertation was on the philosophy of science. He was a student of Sergei Kara-Murza. They met in 1999.

Since 1994 he has been teaching philosophy. He is an docent at the Bashkir State University and the Ufa State Petroleum Technological University. Vakhitov is the author of 97 scientific publications. He is a member of the editorial board of the newspaper Sovetskaya Rossiya.

He was published in newspapers (Literaturnaya Gazeta, Krasnaya Zvezda) and magazines (Yunost, Herald of Culturology, Filosofskie nauki, Voprosy Filosofii, Вестник МГУ, Русско-Византийский вестник, Социологический журнал, Ватандаш), and websites (Pravoslavie.ru, Русская народная линия, Богослов.ru). He is the co-author of the book "Антимиф. Поваренная книга манипулятора. Деконструкция мифов современной России" (2004).

His book «Ленин и мы. Разоблачение мифов» was included in the top 100 best books of 2025 according to the newspaper "Komsomolskaya Pravda". The foreword to this book was written by Zakhar Prilepin. His book – "У нас была великая культура" – was published, like the previous book, by AST in 2025. This book was edited by German Sadulaev. Vakhitov's book about Lenin went through two editions. He is interested in Soviet culture.

He criticized Soviet life for its atheism.

His assistance to the Communist Party of the Russian Federation was praised by the party's leader, Gennady Zyuganov. Vakhitov criticized Aleksandr Dugin and the historian Aleksandr Dyukov.

He lives in Ufa. He is married. His son died in 2023. Rustem Vakhitov called Alexei Dzermant his friend.
