= 7th BRICS summit =

2015 international summit in Ufa, Russia

7th BRICS Summit VII саммит БРИКС
- 8–9 July 2015

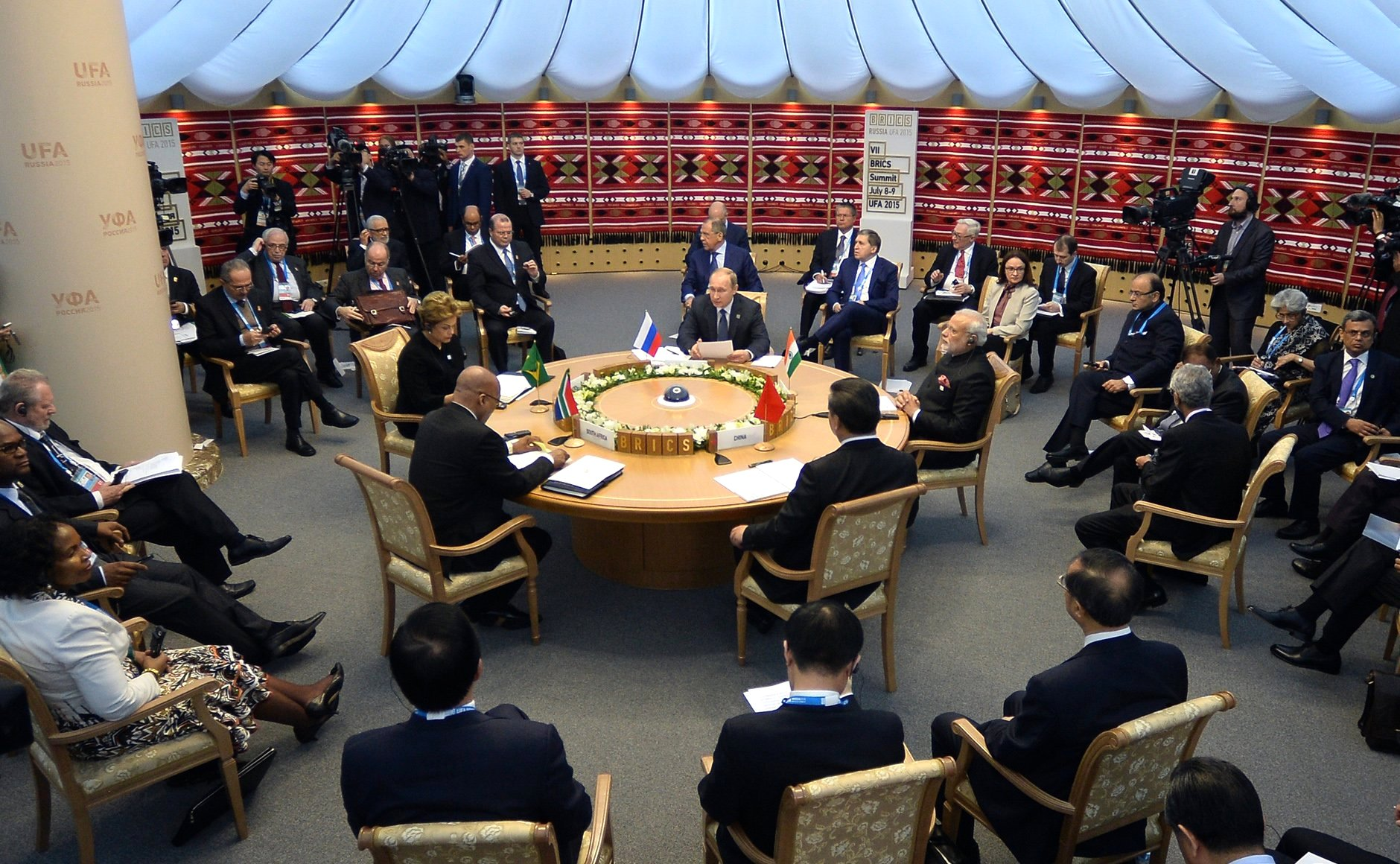
- Host country: Russia
- Cities: Ufa, Bashkortostan
- Participants: Brazil; Russia; India; China; South Africa
- Website: en.brics2015.ru

The 7th BRICS summit was the seventh annual diplomatic summit of the head of states or government of the BRICS member states. It was held in the Russian city of Ufa in Bashkortostan on 8–9 July 2015.

== Background ==
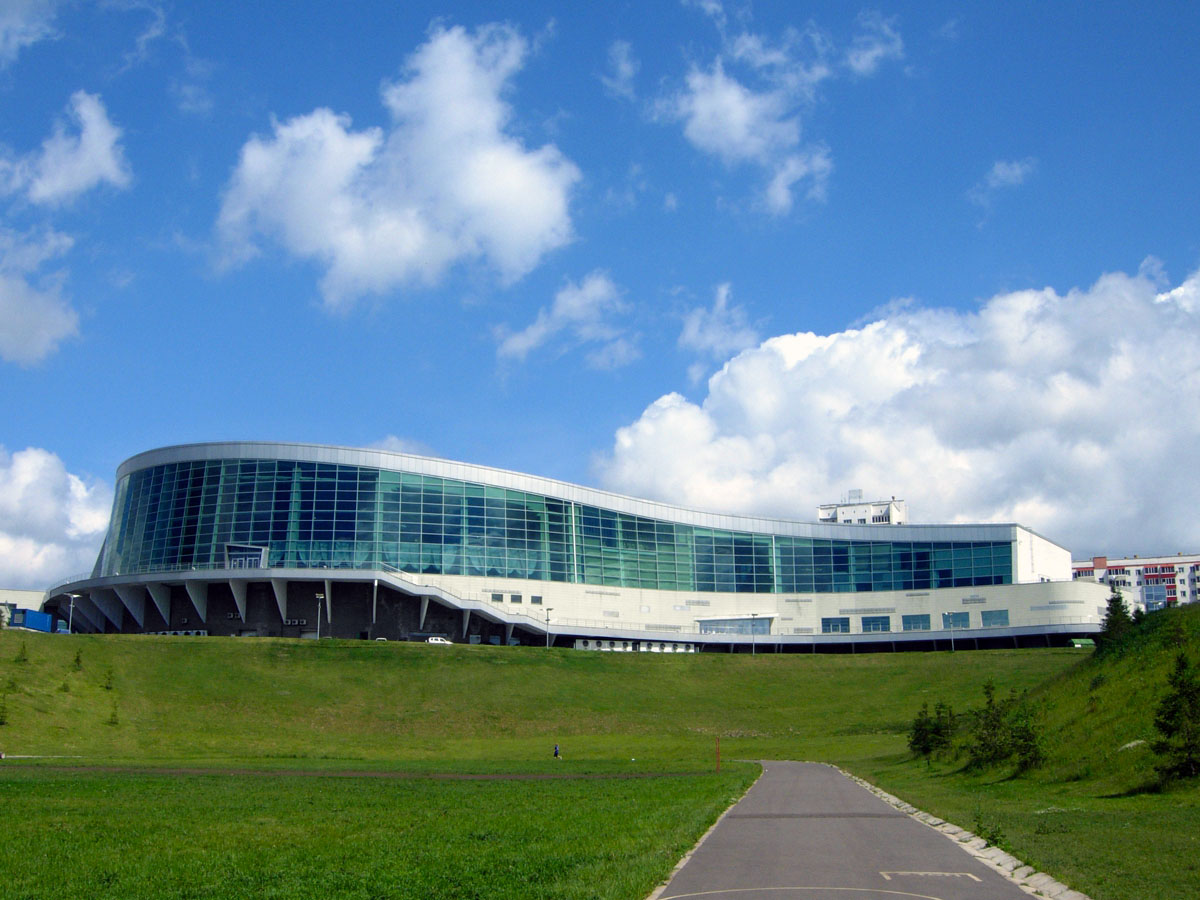
Congress Hall

During the 6th BRICS summit in Fortaleza, Brazil, the BRICS leaders signed a declaration reading: "Brazil, India, China and South Africa convey their appreciation to Russia for its offer to host the Seventh BRICS Summit in 2015 in the city of Ufa and extend their full support to that end."

== Agenda ==
The summit coincided with the entry into force of constituting agreements of the New Development Bank and the BRICS Contingent Reserve Arrangement and during the summit inaugural meetings of the NDB were held, and it was announced it would be lending in local currency; and open up membership to non-BRICS countries in the coming months.

== Participants ==
**Core BRICS members** Host state and leader are shown in bold text.
Member		Represented by	Title
(Brazil)	Brazil	Dilma Rousseff	President
(Russia)	**Russia**	**Vladimir Putin**	**President**
(India)	India	Narendra Modi	Prime Minister
(China)	China	Xi Jinping	CCP General Secretary; President
(South Africa)	South Africa	Jacob Zuma	President

== BRICS-SCO-EEU summit ==
The BRICS held a joint summit with the Shanghai Cooperation Organisation and the Eurasian Economic Union in Ufa on 9 July. Invited heads of states or government:

- Afghanistan – Ashraf Ghani
- Armenia – Serzh Sargsyan
- Belarus – Alexander Lukashenko
- Iran – Hassan Rouhani
- Kazakhstan – Nursultan Nazarbaev
- Kyrgyzstan – Almazbek Atambayev
- Mongolia – Tsakhiagiin Elbegdorj
- Pakistan – Nawaz Sharif
- Tajikistan – Emomali Rahmon
- Uzbekistan – Islam Karimov

== Leaders ==
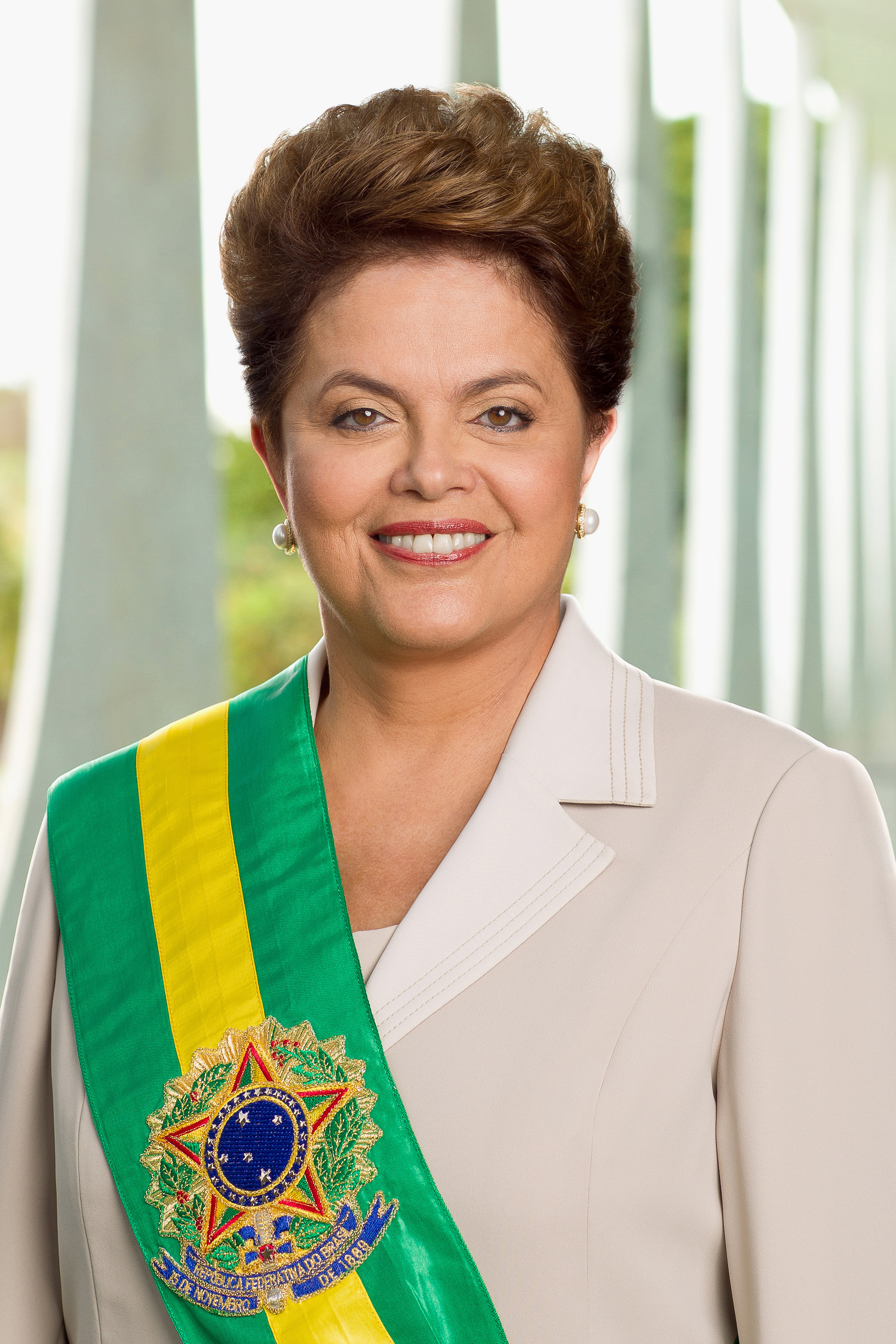
(Brazil) **Brazil**
Dilma Rousseff, President

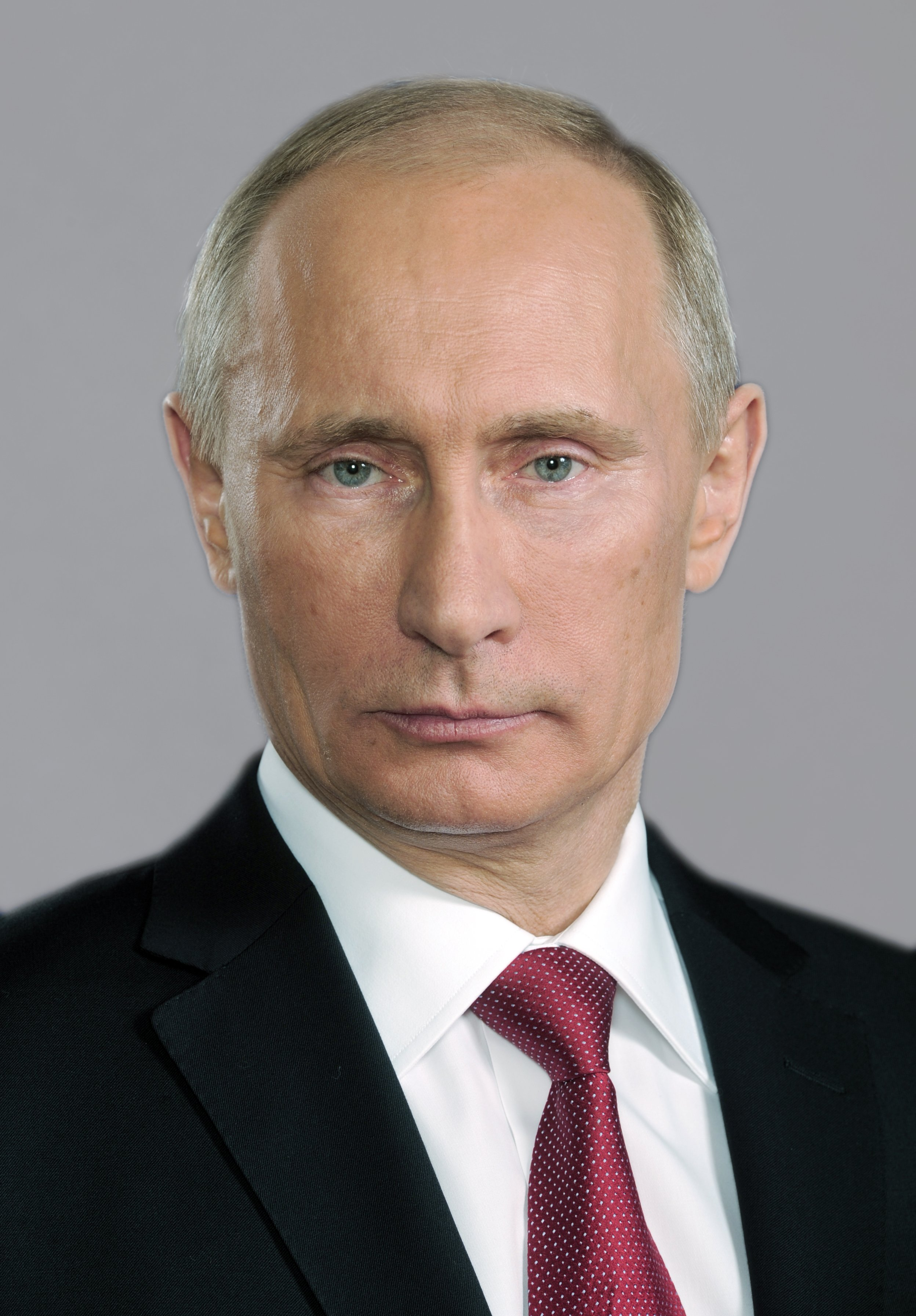
(Russia) **Russia**
**Vladimir Putin, President (Host)**

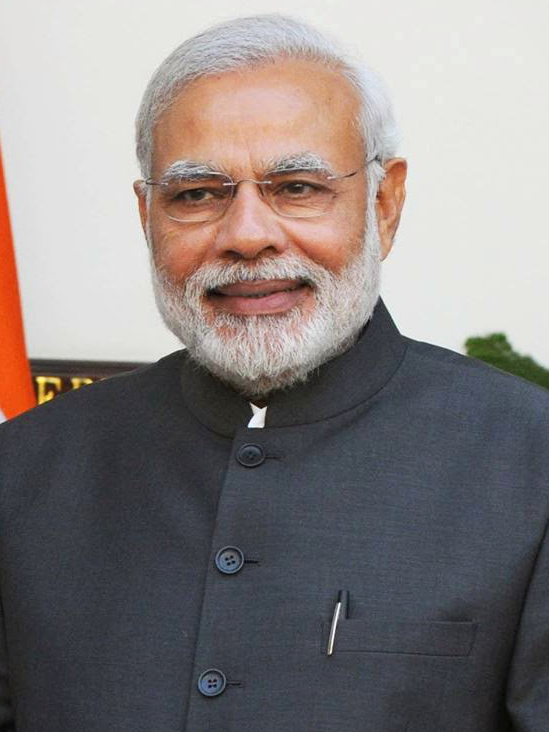
(India) **India**
Narendra Modi,
Prime Minister

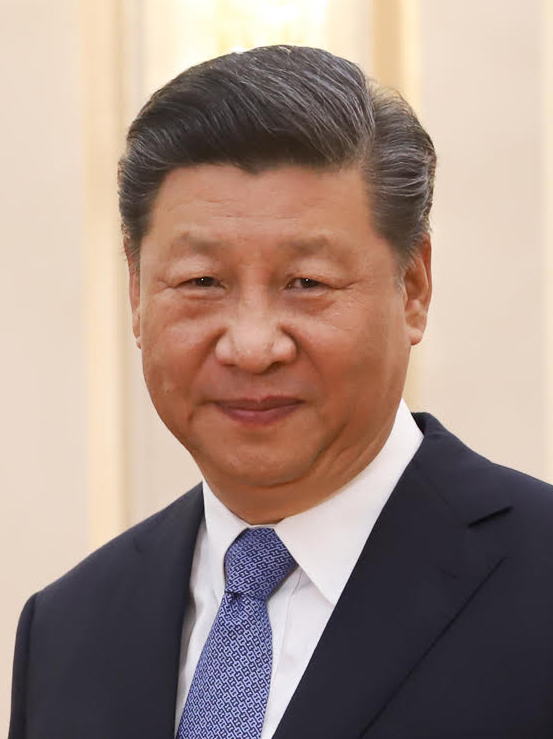
**China**
Xi Jinping, CCP General Secretary and President

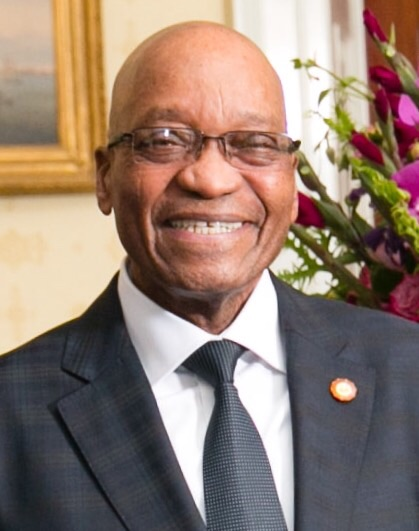
(South Africa) **South Africa**
Jacob Zuma, President

== Gallery ==
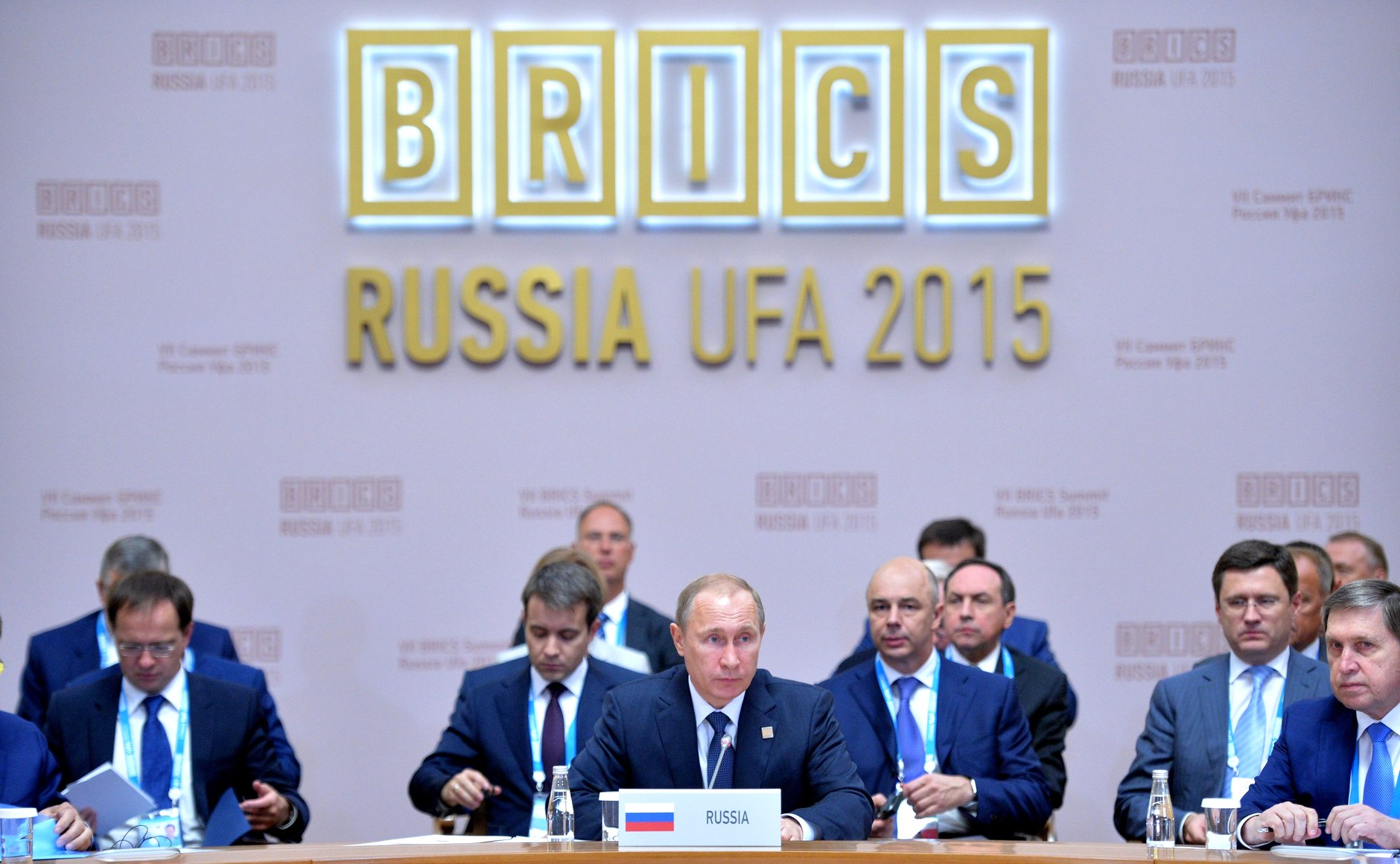

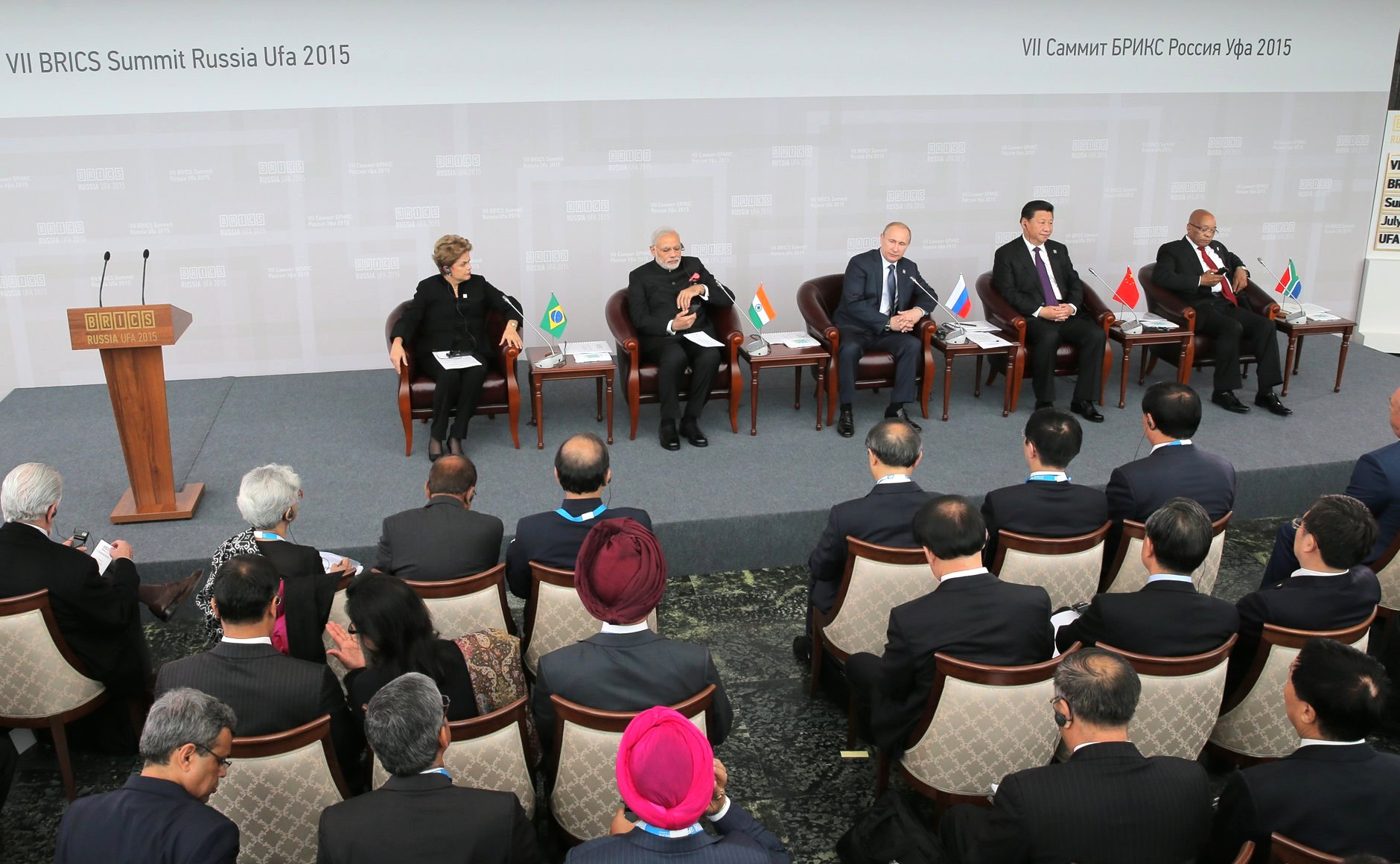

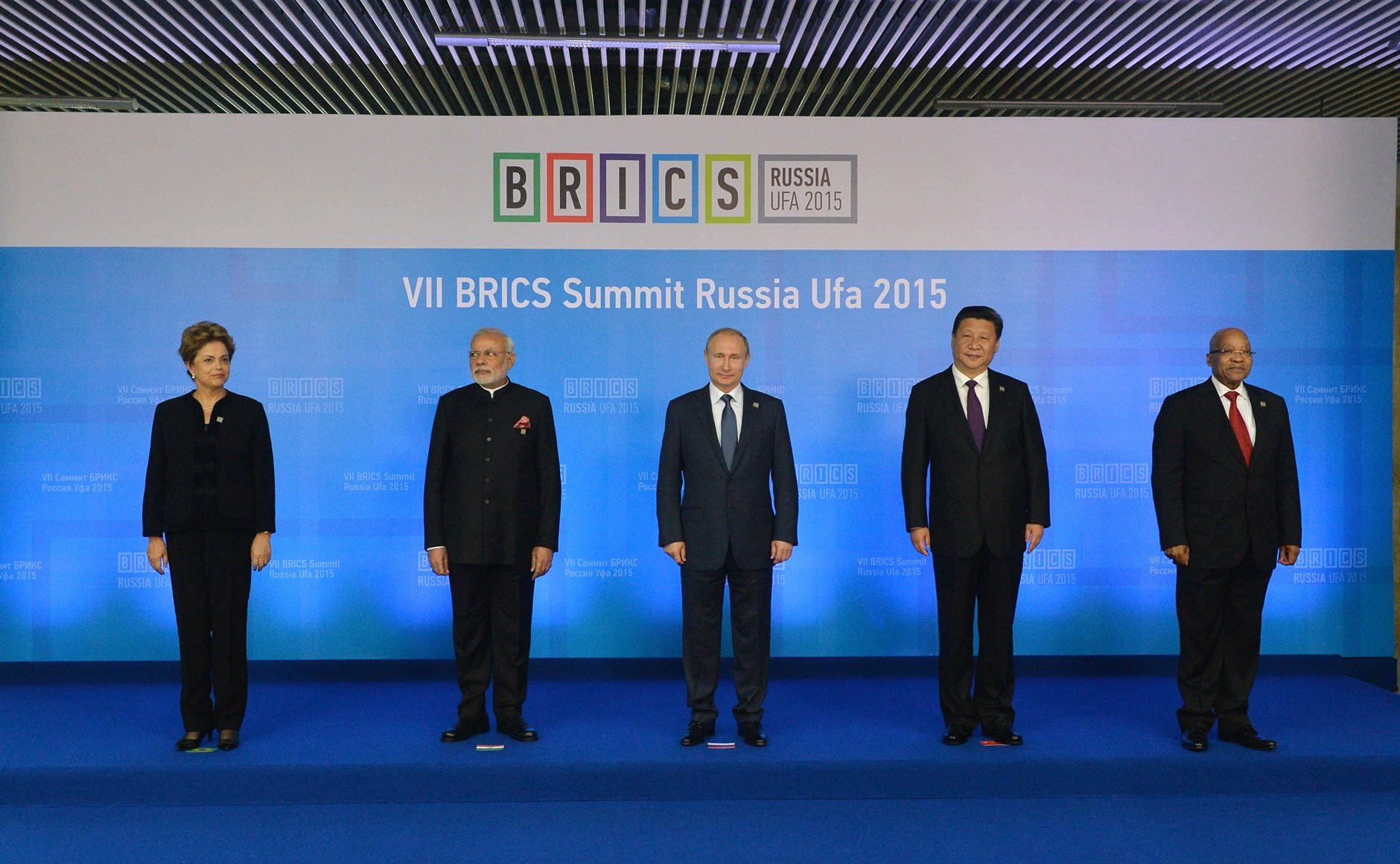

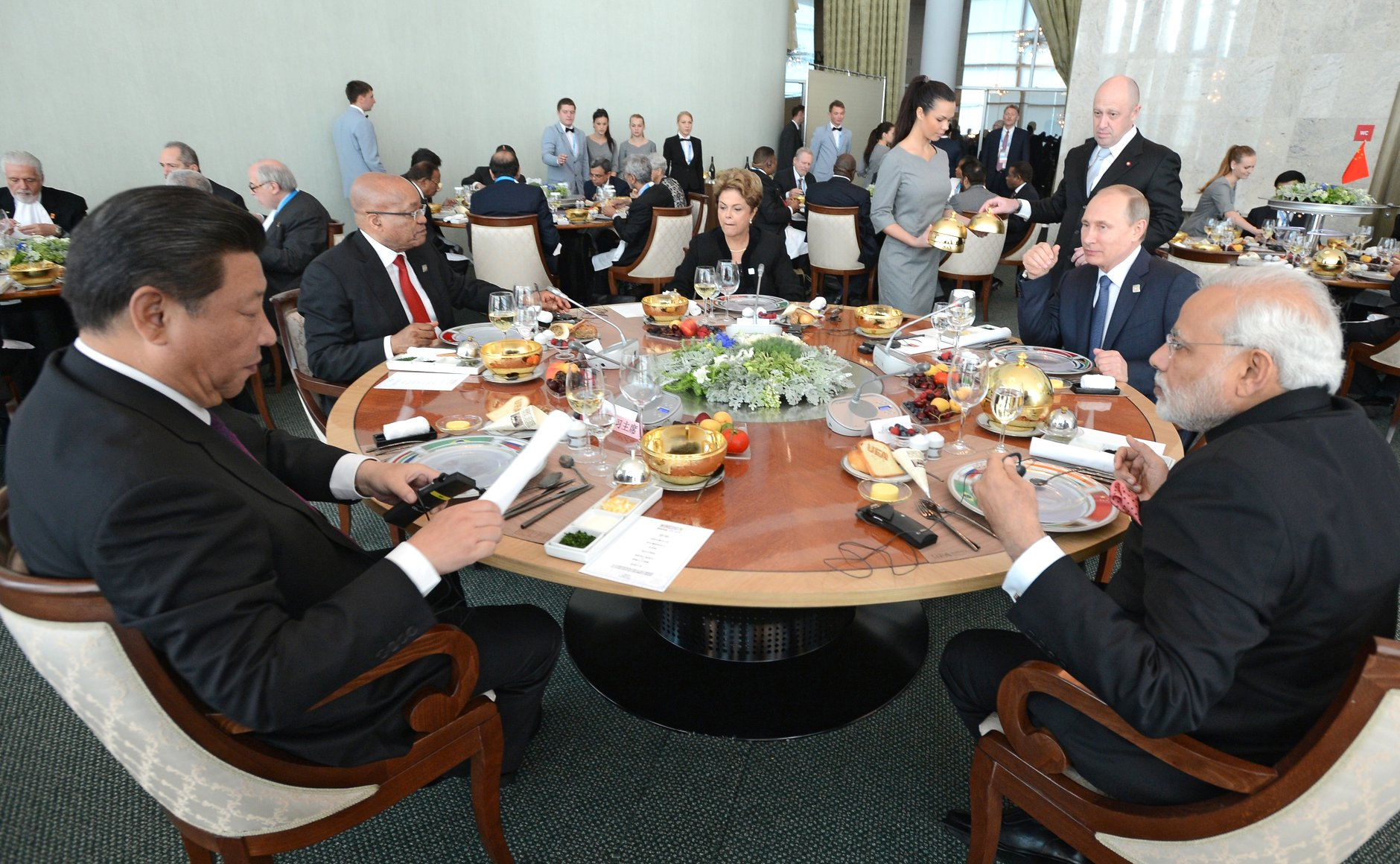

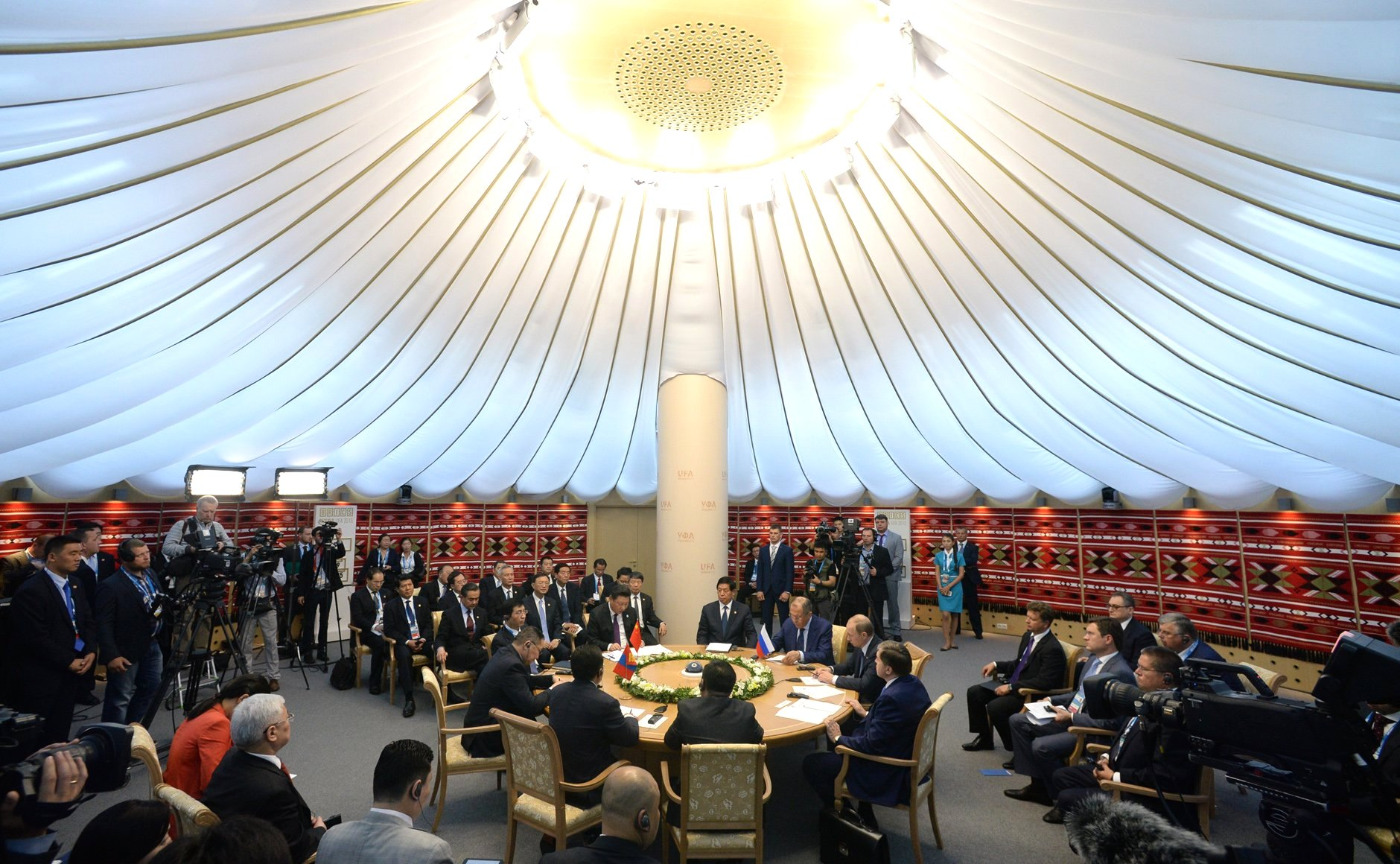
