= Ufa University of Science and Technology =

University in Ufa, Russia

- Уфимский университет науки и технологий
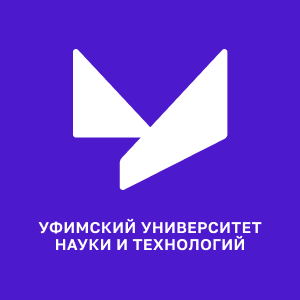
- Type: Public
- Established: 2022
- Rector: Vadim Zakharov
- Location: 32, Zaki Validi str., Ufa, 450076, Russia
- Website: uust.ru

Ufa University of Science and Technology (UUST) is a university in Ufa, Russia. It was established through the reorganization (merger) of two universities — Bashkir State University and Ufa State Aviation Technical University. The official creation date is November 1, 2022. The reorganization order for the merger of two universities was signed by Valery Falkov, Minister of Education and Science of Russia, on July 8, 2022.

== Merger ==
In January 2021, it became known about the merger of two universities in Ufa — Bashkir State University, founded in 1909, and Ufa State Aviation Technical University, founded in 1932. On February 15, 2021, Head of Bashkortostan Radiy Khabirov stated that the decision to merge the two Ufa universities had been made and cannot be canceled. On February 18, 2021, a press conference was held on the merger of two universities. In April 2021, the academic councils of the two universities decided to merge.

In August 2021, the name of the new university became known - Ufa University of Science and Technology, when, due to the merger of two universities, the republic was supposed to receive a federal grant of the Priority 2030 program in the amount of 1 billion rubles . The main grant in the amount of 100 million rubles for a university that has not yet been created was received by BSU in October 2021. BashSU also received an additional grant of 142 million rubles.

In January 2022, the authorities of the republic allocated 200 million rubles for a university that has not yet been united — for grants to students of USPTU and the future Ufa University.

Reorganization order #644 for the merger of two universities was signed on July 8, 2022. According to the order, branches of BSU and USATU in the cities of Birsk, Neftekamsk, Sibay, Sterlitamak, Ishimbay and Kumertau become branches of Ufa University. The new university after the merger was supposed to open on September 1, 2022.

The merger of the two universities has been postponed to November 2022. The diplomas of Ufa University graduates enrolled in 2022 will include two universities - the one they entered — BSU or USATU, and the one they graduated from — Ufa University.

On November 1, 2022, the reorganization (merger) of BashSU and USATU was completed - Ufa University was included in the Unified State Register of Legal Entities, it was headed by Vadim Zakharov.
