= State Academic Folk Dance Ensemble Faizi Gaskarov =

State Academic Folk Dance Ensemble Faizi Gaskarov Ансамбль народного танца имени Файзи Гаскарова
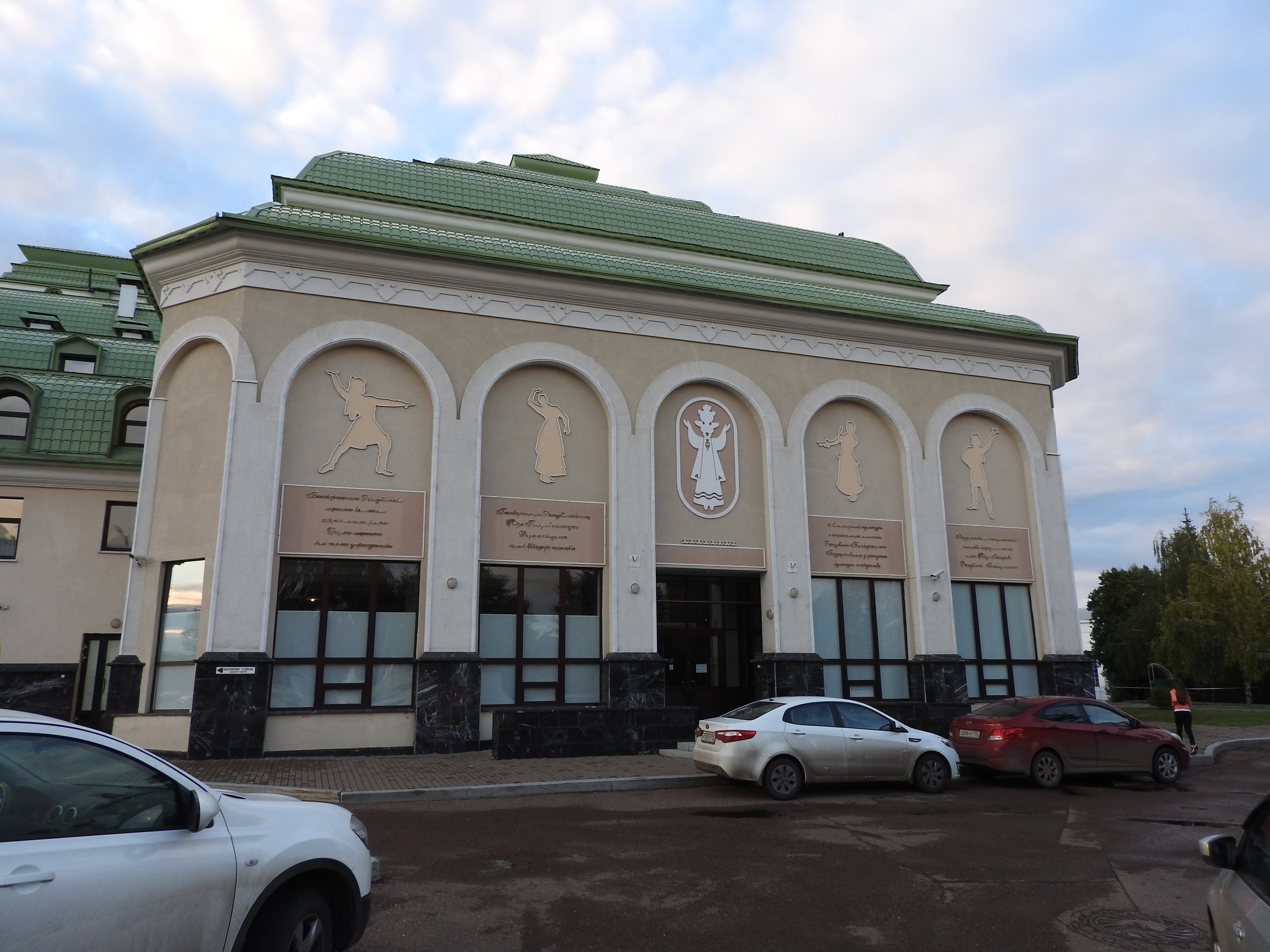

Background information
- Genres: Classical, folk tunes, hymns, operatic arias, popular music
- Years active: 11 March 1939–present
- Website: gaskarov-ensemble.ru

State Academic Folk Dance Ensemble Faizi Gaskarov (Russian: Ансамбль народного танца имени Файзи Гаскарова) is a professional folk dance company of the Republic of Bashkortostan in Russia.

== History ==
The group was formed in 1936-1938 at the concert and variety bureau of the United Theaters of the BASSR from students of the ballet department of the Bashkir Theater School and participants in amateur performances. In 1938, it was reorganized into the Bashkir Song, Dance and Music Ensemble under the newly created Bashkir State Philharmonic. On March 11, 1939, a student of Igor Moiseev, Faizi Adgamovich Gaskarov, became the artistic director of the ensemble and set the direction for the development of the group. This date is considered the ensemble's birthday.

In 1940, he joined the Bashkir State Folk Dance Ensemble. In the summer of 1940, the ensemble made its first tour of Bashkortostan. At the beginning of 1941, he studied at the Decade of Bashkir Literature and Art in Moscow. In 1955, he participated in the decade of Bashkir literature and art in Moscow, which gave the ensemble all-Union fame.

In 1988, the group was named after Fayzi Gaskarov.

In 1991, it separated from the Philharmonic and acquired the status of a legal entity and its modern name. In 1994, two foreign tours took place simultaneously - in the USA and Turkey.

In December 1996, the Ministry of Culture of the Russian Federation awarded the ensemble the title “Academic”. In 2007 the ensemble acquired its own new venue.

== Awards ==
- Salawat Yulayev Award
