= Hadiya Davletshina =

Bashkir poet, writer and playwright

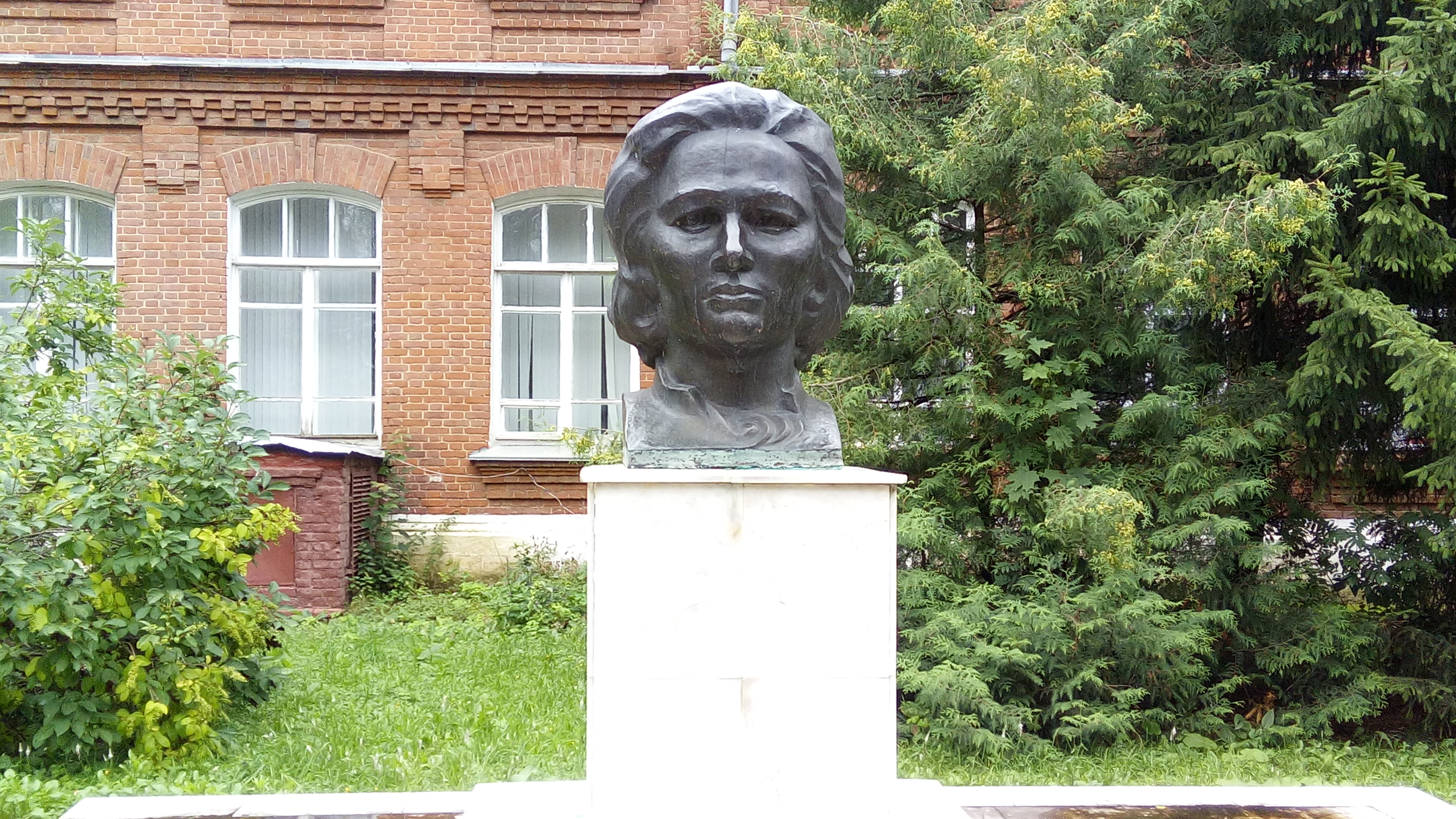
- Monument to Hadiya Davletshina on the territory of the Birsky branch of the Bashkir State University
- Born: Hadiya Lutfulovna Ilyasova; 5 March 1905 now Khasanovo village, Bolshechernigovsky District, Samara Oblast
- Died: 12 May 1954 (aged 49); Birsk, Bashkir ASSR, USSR
- Citizenship: Russian Empire, USSR
- Education: Bashkir State University (1934–1937)
- Occupations: poet, novelist, playwright, librettist
- Writing career
- Notable awards: Salawat Yulayev Award,1967

Hadiya Davletshina (Bashkir: Дәүләтшина Һәҙиә Лотфулла ҡыҙы, romanized: Dəwlətşina Həźiə Lotfulla qıźı, 5 March 1905 – 5 December 1954), was a Bashkir poet, writer and playwright.

== Biography ==
Born 5 March 1905 in the village Khasanovo of Pugachev district in Samara province into a peasant family. Her father's name was Lutfulla Ilyasov, and her mother was named Gulyaohar.

Her grandfather was a village mullah.

Hadiya Ilyasova received her primary education in a rural madrasah, then in a Soviet school. When her father died in 1919, the girl had to take care of the family. Hadiya had to work to feed a deaf mother and three brothers and sisters.

During the Civil War in Russia (1918–1920), Hadiya became one of the first Komsomol (Youth organization) members in the district. From the age of 15, Hadiya Ilyasova began to work as a teacher in the neighboring village of Dengizbaevo. Several times she miraculously managed to escape from the reprisals organized by opponents of the Soviet regime. In 1920, she became a student of the Tatar-Bashkir Pedagogical College in Samara.

In the year 1920 she was working as a teacher in the village of Samara province Dengizbaevo and studied in the Tatar-Bashkir Pedagogical College in Samara;

In 1922, at the age of 17, she married her fellow countryman Gubay Davletshin, who then worked in the Samara Provincial Committee. In 1923 they had a son, Bulat. But the boy was weak and soon died. They had no more children.

Here she began to study Russian, and first became acquainted with the works of Russian classics. Her favorite writer was Maxim Gorky. Hadiya was greatly impressed by his novel "Mother" and other works of the writer. Then she worked in schools, was a teacher in an orphanage.

In 1932–33, Нadiya studied at the Moscow Publishing Institute. In 1935–37, she was a student of the Faculty of Language and Literature of the Bashkir Pedagogical Institute named after Timiryazev (now Bashkir State University).

Hadiya spent 2 years from 1935 to 1937 studying at the Bashkir Pedagogical Institute;

In 1933 she started work as a part of the literary staff of the newspaper BASSR Baimaksky region (along with her husband, Bashkir writer Gubai Davletshin (subsequently Commissar of Education), Bashkir ASSR);

In 1933, with her husband, Gubai Davletshin, Hadiya left for the Baymak district in the south of Bashkortostan, where she worked as an employee of the regional newspaper. In 1934, she participated in the First Congress of Soviet Writers, met with Maxim Gorky. In 1935 she joined the Writers Union of the Bashkir Autonomous Soviet Socialist Republic. In 1936, she was a delegate to the 3rd plenum of writers of the USSR in Minsk. The first story of Hadiya Davletshina, "Hylyukai Pioneer," was published in 1926 in the newspaper "Bashkortostan yeshtere" ("Youth of Bashkortostan"). In 1931, the story "Aybika" was published, bringing the writer wide fame. In 1936, the story was translated into Russian.

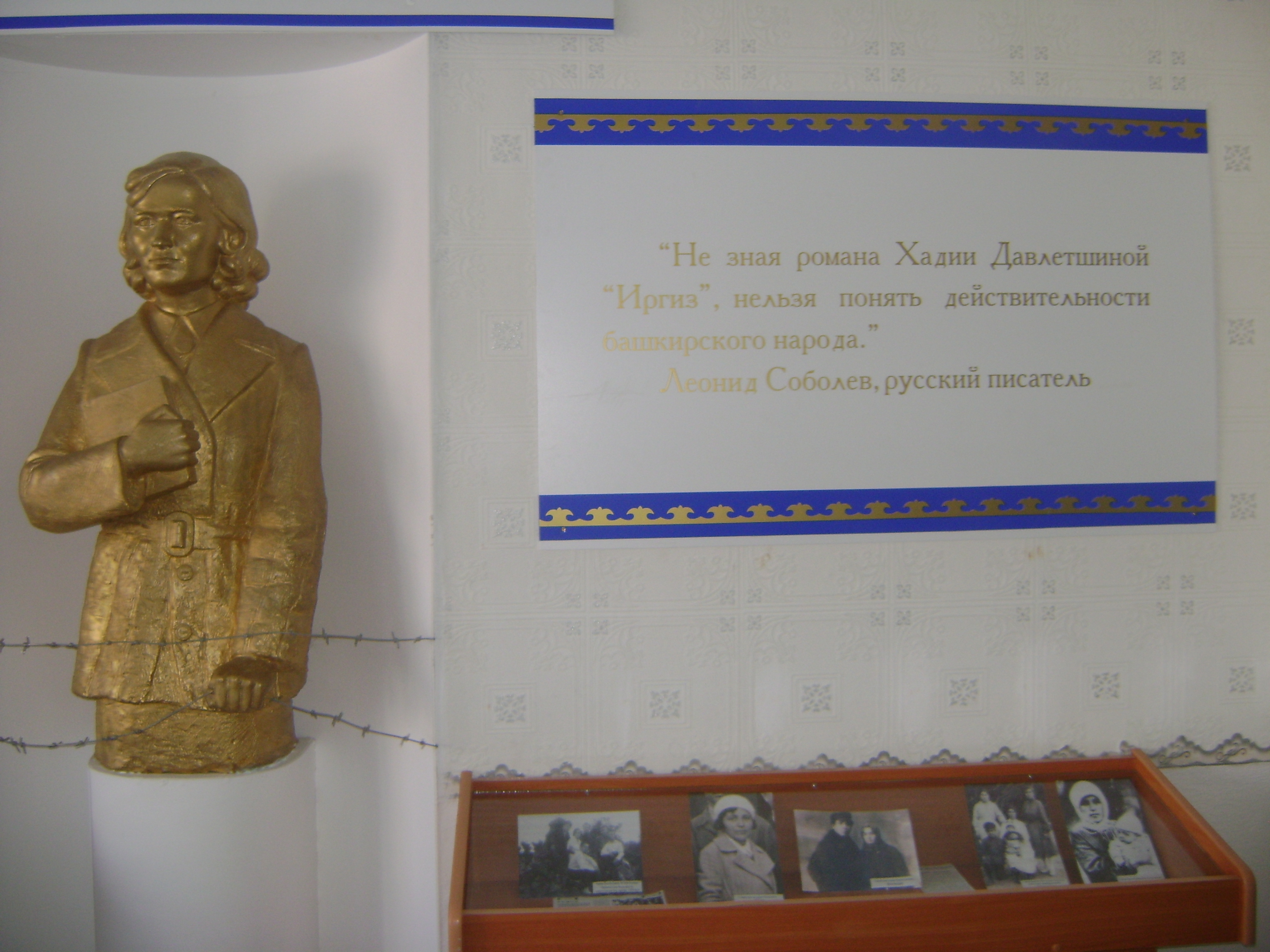
Museum of Hadiya Davletshina in Birsk

For the first time in Bashkir literature, the process of the formation of the personality of a simple Bashkir woman after the 1917 revolution, under the conditions of Soviet power, was deeply and thoroughly shown. Aybika was able to free herself from traditional restrictions and became a tractor driver. So the writer showed an example of the struggle for women's rights.

Hadiya Davletshina wrote a lot and fruitfully. Her poems, essays and stories were constantly published. In 1932, her story "Waves of Ears" was published, later a storybook, the story "Flaming Years".

Everywhere where Davletshins lived, their house was open to friends, relatives, fellow countrymen who needed help. They helped many to get settled in life, to get an education. One of them, the orphan girl Fatima Mustafina, later became the Minister of Education of the Bashkir Autonomous Soviet Socialist Republic.

In the early 30s, the writer began work on the epic novel Irgiz. Some excerpts from it were published in periodicals. For the first time in Bashkir literature, the main character of a major work was the people. The life of the Bashkir people has been shown for two decades against a broad background of social and political events taking place in Russia at the beginning of the 20th century. In her novel, the writer skillfully uses knowledge of the life and way of life of the people, shows the colorful characters and mentality of the Bashkirs.

The use of the wealth of oral folklore, the colorfulness and richness of the language, the epic scale made the novel a classic work not only of Bashkir, but also of all Oriental and Turkic-speaking literature. Speaking at the First Congress of Writers of the RSFSR in 1958, Leonid Sobolev said: "Without knowing Hadia Davletshina's novel Irgiz, one cannot understand the reality of the Bashkir people." The Kazakh writer Sabit Mukanov called her work a creative feat. Hadiya Davletshina is called the first woman novelist of the East.

The active work of Hadiya Davletshina on the novel was brutally interrupted. 1937–1938 in the history of the Soviet Union are called the period of the Great Terror. In 1937, her husband, People's Commissar of Education of the BASSR Gubay Davletshin, was arrested and later shot. He did a lot for the development of the education and culture of the Bashkir Republic. Hadiya Davletshina, as a "member of the family of the enemy of the people", was sentenced to five years in prison, which she spent in Mordovia. Here she worked with other prisoners and mentally continued her novel Irgiz. In conclusion, her tuberculosis worsened . In 1942, she was released due to illness. Hadia wanted to return to Ufa, but she was sent to exile in Birsk without the right to leave.

In Birsk, Hadiya Davletshina lived in great need. She was not given work. She was strictly forbidden to publish her works and engage in literary activities. In the last years of her life, she worked as a cleaner at the Birsk State Pedagogical Institute. On 20 March 1951, Hadiya Davletshina wrote a letter to the chairman of the board of the Union of Writers of the USSR, Alexander Fadeev, in which she asked for help with the publication of the novel. This letter is written on six pages, on the sheets there are many spots from the tears of the writer.

In Birsk, after some time, Hadiya married Safin, who took care of her and managed to extend her life a bit. Hadiya Davletshina died on 5 December 1954.She did not see her novel published.

The novel "Irgiz" was published only in 1957. It came out in a large circulation in the Bashkir book publishing house. Later it came out in Russian and was published in the languages of the peoples of the USSR. In 1985, a collection of novels and short stories by the writer Aybika was published in Bashknigoizdat. In 2005, the publishing house "Kitap" published the volume of selected works of Hadiya Davletshina.

In 1967, for the novel "Irgiz", the writer posthumously became the first laureate of the Republican Prize of the Bashkir Autonomous Soviet Socialist Republic named after Salawat Yulayev .

Despite a serious illness, Hadiya Davletshina wrote a lot, but her works were not allowed to publish. After the death of writer, her mother Guliaohar (blind) gave Hadiya's manuscripts to people who promised to publish them. The investigation has not yet yielded any result.

== Bibliography ==
- The first story "Pioneer Hylukai" (Bashkir: "Hylyukai-pioneer") was published in the newspaper "Bashortostan yeshtere" ("Youth of Bashkortostan"), 1926;
- The story "Aybika" ( 'Aybike' ) 1931;
- The story "Waves of ears" ( 'Bashaktar tulkyny' ), 1932;
- "Collection of short stories", 1935;
- The story "Flaming Years" ( 'Yalkynly Yildar' ), 1933–37;
- Novel "Irgiz" ( "Irgith " ), 1942–52, published 1957.
- Davletshina, H. Aibika: novel [Text] / H. Davletshin; tr. from bash. R.Akhmedova.-Ufa, 1972.- 78 p.
- Davletshina, H. Irgiz: novel [Text] / X. Daletshina; tr.. from bash. V. Vasilevsky.-M.: Contemporary, 1979.-478

== Memory ==
- The name of Hadiya Davletshina was assigned to the boulevard in Ufa, the streets in cities and towns of the Bashkortostan.
- Monuments were erected to her in Birsk and Sibay
- The Republican Prize named after Hadia Davletshina in the field of children's literature
- G. Shafikov. "Hadiya" (play)
- R. Nurullin. "Hadiya" (full-length fiction and publicity film).

== Bibliography ==
- Pearl of Bashkortostan [Text] // Uzikov Yu. Ufa streets names. – Ufa: Ufa Polygraph Combine, 2007.-S.72–74.
- Shakur R. The creative feat of the writer (on the 100th anniversary of the birth of Khadia Davletshina) [Text] / R. Shakur // Teacher of Bashkortostan.-2005.-No3.-P.59-60.

== Links ==
- History and culture of Bashkortostan (in Russian)
- The literary map of the Republic of Bashkortostan (in Russian)
- Literature in Ufa (in Russian)
- The Encyclopedia Of Bashkortostan (in Russian)
- Movies about Hadiya Davletshina (in Russian)
