= Rinat Galeyev =

Russian businessman

Galeyev Rinat Gimadelislamovich
- Галеев Ринат Гимаделисламович
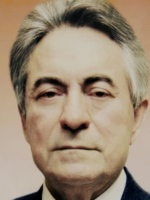
- Born: 13.01.1939; Sharlama, Tatarstan
- Died: 23.10.2007
- Education: Ufa State Petroleum Technological University

Rinat Gimadelislamovich Galeyev (January 1, 1939 – October 23, 2007) was a Russian businessman from the Tatarstan region, and the general director of the sixth-largest Russian oil company Tatneft from 1990 to 1999.

== Early life ==
Galeyev was born in Sharlama, Tatarstan.

In 1958 he graduated from the Oktyabrsky Oil College. In 1967 he graduated from the Ufa Petroleum Institute, where he specialised as a mining engineering.

== Career ==
He started his career as a well exploration operator at Almetyevneft Oil Refinery.

From 1974 to 1977, he was Deputy Head of Tatneft.

From 1990 to 1999 Galeyev was the general director of the sixth-largest Russian oil company Tatneft.

== Awards ==
- 1991 - Order of Lenin
- 1981 - Order of the Red Banner of Labour
- 1971 - Order of the Badge of Honour
- 1994 - The State Prize of the Republic of Tatarstan
- 1997 - Order of Friendship of Peoples

=== Honours ===
- 1993 - Honored Worker of the Oil and Gas Industry of the Russian Federation
- 1982 - Honored Oil industry worker of TASSR
- 1990 - Honored Oil industry worker of Republic of Bashortostan
- 1993 - Honorary citizen of the city of Almetyevsk
