= Salawat Yulayev Award =

Award of the Bashkortostan

- Awarded for: Accomplishments in literature, sciences, the art and architecture, labor
- Presented by: the Russia, Bashkortostan
- Eligibility: All nationals
- Status: Award
- Established: 1967
- First award: September 25, 1967

The Salawat Yulayev Award (Russian: Премия имени Салавата Юлаева, Bashkir: Салауат Юлаев исемендәге Башҡортостан Республикаһының Дәүләт Премияһы,) is an award of the Bashkortostan (previous to The Bashkir Republic) established to honour great deeds and services to the Soviet state and society in the fields of production, science, culture, literature, the arts, education, health, social and other spheres of labour activities.

== Recipients ==
=== 1967 ===
- Hadiya Davletshina, Bashkir poet. "In the novel" Irgiz "(posthumously)" (1967).
- Mustai Karim, Bashkir poet. In the first volume of "Selected Works" (1967)

=== 1968 ===
- Husain Ahmetov
- Zainab Biisheva
- Zagir Ismagilov, Bashkir composer and educator.
- State Academic Folk Dance Ensemble Faizi Gaskarov
- Bayezit Bikbay, Bashkir poet, writer and playwright. 1970, posthumously.
- Saifi Kudash

=== 2008 ===
- Arai Kiyokazu, Rishat Mullagildin (project Congress Hall, Ufa).

=== 2016 ===
- Airat Teregulov

== See also ==
- Bulat Sultangareev Award
