= Vadim Zakharov (scientist) =

Russian scientist

Vadim Petrovich Zakharov
- Вадим Петрович Захаров
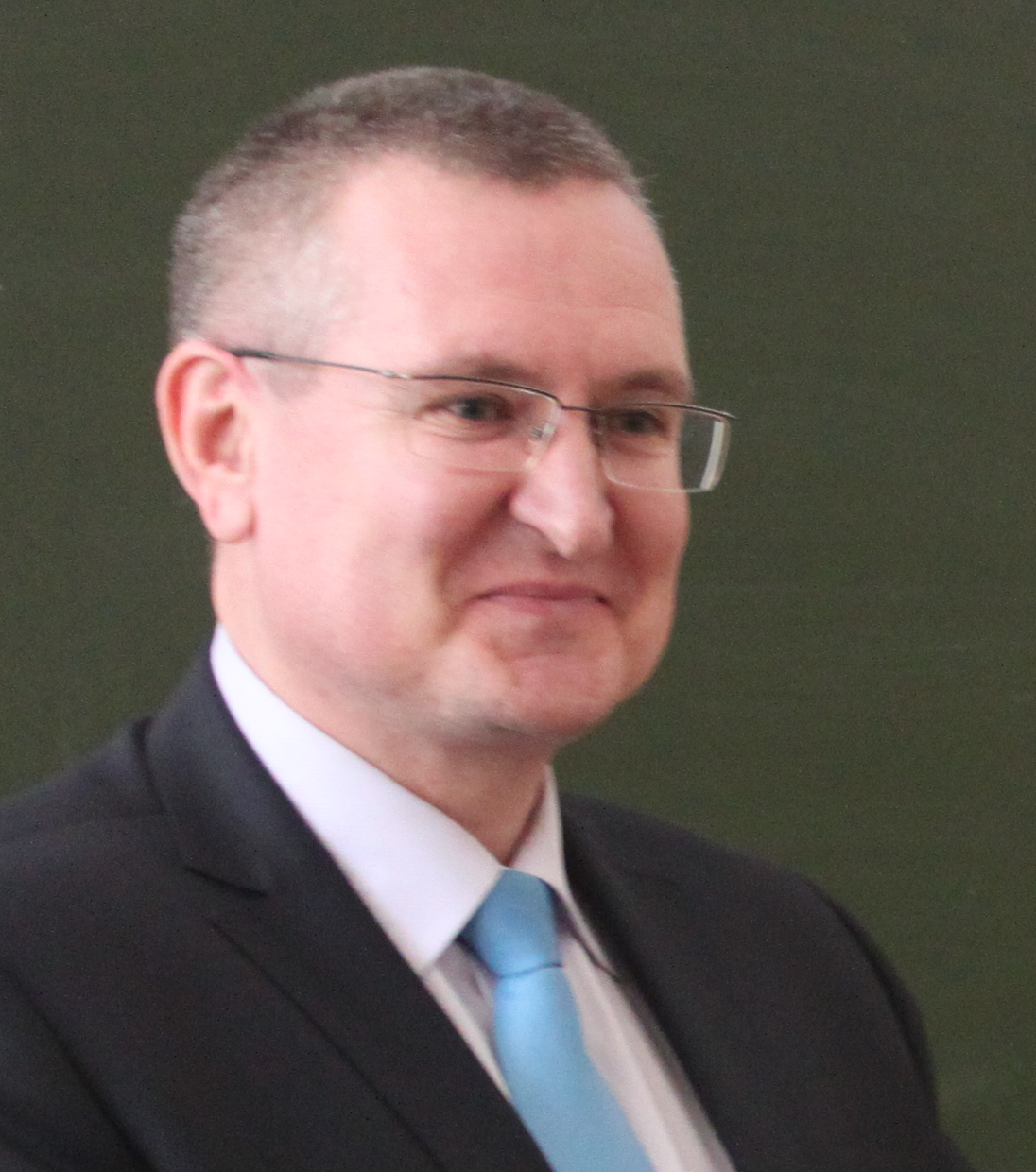

Acting Rector of Bashkir State University
- Incumbent
- Assumed office 8 April 2022

Personal details
- Born: April 19, 1975 (age 51) Semyono-Pokrovskoye, Kugarchinsky District, Bashkir ASSR, Russian SFSR
- Children: 1 son 1 daughter
- Education: Bashkir State University
- Profession: scientist, Doctor of Chemical Sciences, professor
- Website: www.anrb.ru/blog/Item/2781/71

Vadim Petrovich Zakharov (Russian: Вадим Петрович Захаров; born 19 April 1975 in Semyono-Pokrovskoye, Kugarchinsky District, Bashkir Autonomous Soviet Socialist Republic, Russian Soviet Federative Socialist Republic, Soviet Union) is a Russian scientist-chemist, high school teacher, Doctor of Chemical Sciences (2004), professor (2009) and acting rector at Bashkir State University (since 8 April 2022). Professor of the Academy of Sciences of the Republic of Bashkortostan (2016). interim chairman (2020—2021) and then chairman (since 2021) of the Ufa Federal Research Center of the Russian Academy of Sciences. Vice-rector for research of Bashkir State University (2012—2020).

== Biography ==
Vadim Petrovich Zakharov was born on 19 April 1975 in the village of Semeno-Petrovskoye, Kugarchinsky District, Bashkir ASSR. His father, Pyotr Prokhorovich Zakharov (1932–2011), worked as a blacksmith at Seyatel collective farm. His mother, Nadezhda Egorovna Zakharova (née, Lebedeva; 1935–1993), worked as an accountant in the village council. He studied at the Semenopetrovsk secondary school, from which he graduated with a silver medal in 1992.

Studies and career path

- 1992–1997 – studied at the Faculty of Chemistry at Bashkir State University. Graduated from the university with honors.
- 1997–2000 – studied full-time in the graduate school at Bashkir State University.
- 2000 – defended his dissertation for the degree of Candidate of Chemical Sciences on the topic of "Fast processes in the synthesis of polymers in turbulent flows" (specialty 02.00.06 "High-molecular compounds"]) ahead of schedule. Scientific adviser – Honored Scientist of the RSFSR, Doctor of Chemical Sciences, Professor K. S. Minsker.
- 2000–2001 – senior research associate of the research laboratory.
- 2001–2004 – studied full-time in the doctoral school at Bashkir State University.
- 2004 – defended his dissertation for the degree of Doctor of Chemical Sciences on the topic of "Chemical and heat-and-mass transfer processes in the synthesis of polymers in turbulent flows" (specialty 02.00.06 "High-molecular compounds") ahead of schedule. Scientific consultant: Honored Scientist of the RSFSR, Doctor of Chemical Sciences, Professor K. S. Minsker.
- 2004–2006 – professor of the Department of Macromolecular Compounds and General Chemical Technology of Bashkir State University.
- 2006–2010 – head of the laboratory at "Rosneft-UfaNIPIneft" LLC.
- 2010–2012 – department head at "Rosneft-UfaNIPIneft" LLC.
- 2012–2018 – vice-rector for research at Bashkir State University.
- 2018–2020 – Vice-rector for research and innovations at Bashkir State University.
- 2019–2020 – graduate of the educational program of the Moscow School of Management "Skolkovo" "Leaders of scientific and technological breakthrough" for heads of scientific organizations and higher education bodies.
- July 2020 – appointed as interim chairman of the Ufa Federal Research Center of the Russian Academy of Sciences.
- April 2021 – elected as chairman of the Ufa Federal Research Center of the Russian Academy of Sciences.
- On 8 April 2022, Vadim Zakharov was appointed as acting rector of Bashkir State University.

== Family ==
He his married, has a son and a daughter.

== Research and teaching work ==
Professor V. P. Zakharov participated in fundamental studies on the kinetics and processes mechanisms of stereospecific polymerization of dienes on Ziegler-Natta type catalysts; intensification of heat-and-mass transfer of ultrafast chemical processes; rheology of polymer compositions, including associative ("smart") polymers, during filtration in a porous medium; creation of biodegradable polymer composites based on secondary raw materials. The obtained theoretical basis made it possible to develop solutions, thanks to which the tasks were solved for developing production and economic indicators in the field of technology for synthesis and processing of polymers and the use of polymers for physical and chemical methods of enhanced reservoir recovery rate. Moreover, small-sized high-performance tubular turbulent apparatuses were introduced into the industrial production of chlorinated butyl rubber, ethylene-propylene and isoprene rubber. V. P. Zakharov is the author of 8 monographs, 3 of which were published abroad (in the UK, the Netherlands and the USA), more than 280 scientific articles (more than half of which are abstracted in the international databases of Web of Science and Scopus), 25 patents (10 implemented with a significant economic effect at the enterprises of the real sector of the economy, 7 of them — at the largest industrial enterprises of Bashkortostan). Mentored 7 Candidates of Sciences and 1 Doctor of Sciences.

== Honors and awards ==
- Honoree of the Prize from the Government of the Russian Federation in the field of science and technology (2005) — for the development and industrial application of new technologies for fast chemical processes in turbulent mode;
- Honored Scientist of the Republic of Bashkortostan (2015);
- Honoree of the State Prize of the Republic of Bashkortostan in the field of science and technology (2019)[11] — for the work on "Development and industrial application of a new method for controlling the polycentricity of Ziegler-Natta catalysts";
- Honoree of the State Youth Prize in the sphere of science and technology (Bashkortostan, 2007)];
- Medal of the Russian Academy of Sciences and a prize for young scientists (2006) — for the series of works on "Macrokinetic regularities of the occurrence of fast liquid-phase reactions";
- Honoree of the S. R. Rafikov Prize in the field of chemistry and petrochemistry (2002) — for the series of scientific works "Theory and practice of obtaining heavy tonnage rubbers with Ziegler-Natta type catalysts"[14];
- Certificate of honor from the Ministry of Education and Science of the Russian Federation (2005) - for a great contribution to the development of science and in connection with the Day of Russian Science;
- Diplomas from the president of the Republic of Bashkortostan (2002, 2003) — for great achievements in the field of scientific research;
- Finalist of "Leaders of Russia 2020" contest (specialization — "Science").
