= Khairulla Murtazin =

Russian mathematician

- Born: 4 January 1941; Bashkir ASSR, Russia
- Died: 17 November 2016 (aged 75); Ufa, Russia
- Education: Bashkir State University, Steklov Institute of Mathematics
- Known for: Pedagogics, mathematics
- Scientific career
- Fields: Mathematics
- Workplaces: Bashkir State University
- Doctoral advisor: Mark Naimark

Murtazin Khairulla Khabibullovich (Russian: Муртазин Хайрулла Хабибуллович; 4 January 1941 – 17 November 2016) was a Russian mathematician. Since 1978 he has been the Head of the Chair of Mathematical analysis Bashkir State University.

== Biography ==
Murtazin was born in the village Aznash in Uchalinsky District, now in Bashkortostan. He graduated from the Department of Mathematics of Bashkir State University and defended his doctoral thesis in 1994. Since 1978 until the present day he is the head of the Mathematical Analysis chair of the department

Scientific activity is devoted to problems of quantum mechanics.

Murtazin investigated the asymptotic behavior of the discrete spectrum of the Schrödinger operator, the spectrum of perturbations of partial differential operators, results on the two-particle operators in the class of integrable potentials, conditions for the existence of virtual particles 4. The results of the studies were used in the work on quantum mechanics, nuclear physics and acoustics, for geological and seismic work research and design institute of well logging VNIIGIS (Oktyabrsky, Republic of Bashkortostan).

Author of more than 70 scientific papers.

== Awards and honours ==
- 2003 – Honored worker of science of the Republic of Bashkortostan
- 2008 – Honorary Worker of Higher specialized Education of the Russian Federation
- 2011 – laureate of the State Prize of the Republic of Bashkortostan in the field of science and technology
