= Ganeyev =

Ganeyev or Ganeev (feminine: Ganeyeva, Ganeeva) is a surname. Notable people with the surname include:

- Renal Ganeyev (born 1985), Russian fencer
- Marat Ganeyev (born 1964), Russian cyclist
- Vera Karmishina-Ganeeva (born 1988), Russian athlete

== See also ==
- Galeyev
