= Novosepyashevo =

Novosepyashevo Новосепяшево
- Selo
- Location within Bashkortostan Location within Russia
- Coordinates: 54°04′N 55°02′E
- Country: Russia
- Region: Bashkortostan
- District: Alsheyevsky District
- Time zone: UTC+5:00

Novosepyashevo (Russian: Новосепяшево; Bashkir: Яңы Сәпәш, Yañı Säpäş) is a rural locality (a selo) and the administrative center of Ibrayevsky Selsoviet, Alsheyevsky District, Bashkortostan, Russia. The population was 283 as of 2010. There are 3 streets.

== Geography ==
Novosepyashevo is located 10 km east of Rayevsky (the district's administrative centre) by road. Linda is the nearest rural locality.

== See also ==
- Rozalia Sultangareeva- Bashkir folklorist, scientist.Folk songs-kubayrs performer.
