= Rinad Yulmukhametov =

Russian mathematician (born 1957)

- Born: 17 January 1957 (age 69); Bashkir ASSR, Russia
- Education: Bashkir State University, Steklov Institute of Mathematics
- Known for: Pedagogics, mathematics
- Scientific career
- Fields: Mathematics
- Workplaces: Bashkir State University
- Doctoral advisor: Valentin Napalkov

Rinad Salavatovich Yulmukhametov (Russian: Ринад Салаватович Юлмухаметов; born 17 January 1957) is a Russian mathematician.

== Biography ==
Yulmukhametov was born in the village Urge Atkol in Ishimbaysky District, now in Bashkortostan. He graduated from the Department of Mathematics of Bashkir State University and defended his doctoral thesis in 1987. 1995-2009 he is the head of the Department of Programming and Economic Informatics.

== Advances in science ==
1. Existence theorems for entire functions with given asymptotic behavior;
2. Solved the problem of spectral synthesis in the space of solutions of a homogeneous convolution equation;
3. Solved factorization problem Ehrenpreis.

== Works ==
1. Пространство H(p) в круге. сб. БФАН СССР, Уфа, 1981.
2. Достаточные множества в одном пространстве целых функций. Математический сб. т.116, No. 3, 1981.
3. Целые функции, имеющие заданный индикатор роста и хорошую асимптотическую оценку. сб. БФАН СССР, Уфа, 1982
4. Асимптотическая аппроксимация целых функций. ДАН СССР, т.264, No. 4, 1982
5. Пространства аналитичексих функций, имеющих заданный рост вблизи границы. Математические заметки, т.32, No. 1, 1982
6. Приближение субгармонических функций. Математический сб. т.124, No. 3, 1984
7. Двойственность в выпуклых областях. сб. БФАН СССР, Уфа, 1984
8. Асимптотическая аппроксимация субгармонических функций. Сибирский мат. жур. т.26, No. 4, 1985
9. Аппроксимация субгармонических функций. Analysis Mathematica, т.11, No. 3, 1985
10. Квазианалитические классы функций в выпуклых областях. Математический сб., т.130, No. 4, 1986
11. Асимптотика плюрисубгармонических функций. препринт БФАН СССР, Уфа, 1987
12. Асимптотика разности субгармонических функций. Математические. заметки, т.41, No. 3, 1987
13. Аппроксимация опорных функций. Труды Всесоюзного симпозиума по теории приближения функций, Уфа, 1987
14. Достаточные множества в одном пространстве целых функций. сб. БФАН СССР, Уфа, 1987
15. Аппроксимация однородных субгармоничесих функций. Математический сб., т.134, No. 4, 1987
16. Асимптотика многомерного интеграла Лапласа. сб. БНЦ УрО АН СССР, Уфа, 1989
17. Луценко В. И. Обобщение теоремы Пэли-Винера на весовые пространства. Математ. заметки, т.48, No. 5,1990
18. Однородные уравнения свертки. ДАН СССР, т.316, No. 2, 1991
19. Луценко В. И. Теорема Пэли-Винера в пространствах Смирнова. Труды МИАН СССР им. В. А. Стеклова, 1991
20. Напалков В. В. (мл.) Весовые преобразования Фурье-Лапласа аналитических функционалов в круге. Математический сб., т.183, No. 11, 1992
21. Напалков В. В. (мл.) О преобразовании Коши функционалов на пространстве Бергмана. Математический сб., т. 185, No. 7, 1994
22. Преобразование Фурье-Лапласа функционалов. кн. Линейные операторы в комплексном анализе", Ростов-на-Дону, 1994
23. Расщепление целых функций с нулями в полосе. Математический сб., т. 186, No. 7, 1995
24. Проблема Эйренпрайса о факторизации в алгебрах гладких функций. Школа-конференция «Теория функций и ее приложения», Казань, 1995
25. Разложение целых функций на произведение двух функций эквивалентного роста. Математический сб., т.187, No. 7, 1996
26. Целые функции многих переменных с заданным поведением в бесконечности. Изв. РАН. сер. мат., т.60, No. 4, 1996
27. Решение проблемы Эйренпрайса. Вестник БГУ, No. 1, 1996
28. Разложение целых функций на произведение двух «почти равных» функций. Сибир. мат. жур., т.38, No. 2, 1997
29. Гладкая регуляризация плюрисубгармонических функций. Тезисы док. межд. конф. по компл. анализу и смеж. вопросам. Н.Новгород, 1997
30. Регуляризация плюрисубгармонических функций. Матем. заметки, т.62, No. 2, 1997
31. Целые функции с заданным асимптотическим поведением. Функ. анализ и его прил. т.32, No. 3, 1998
32. Луценко В. И. On Entire Functions with Given Asymptotic Behavior. Complex Variables, V.37, 1998
33. Решение проблемы Л. Эйренпрайса о факторизации. Докл. РАН, т.360, No. 1, 1998
34. Решение проблемы Л. Эйренпрайса о факторизации. Математический сб., т.190, No. 4, 1999
35. Абузярова Н. Ф. Сопряженные пространства к весовым пространствам аналитических функций. Сибир. мат. жур., т.42, No. 1, 2001
36. Трунов К. В. Квазианалитичность и задача Дирихле. Труды Матем. Центра им. Н. И. Лобачевского, Казань, 2001
37. Трунов К. В. Quasianalicity, completeness of polynomials and the Dirichlet problem. Intern. Akhiezer Centenary Conf. «Theory of functions and math. physics», Kharkiv, 2001`
38. Исаев К. П. The Laplace transform of functionals on Bergman space. Inter. Conf. On Comp. Analysis And Poten. Theory, Kiev, 2001
39. Абузярова Н. Ф. The Cauchy transform on weighted spaces of analytic functions and some Hilbert scales. Inter. Conf. On Comp. Analysis And Poten. Theory, Kiev, 2001
40. Напалков В. В. (мл.) О преобразовании Гильберта в пространствах Бергмана. Матем. заметки, т.70, вып.1, 2001
