= Muradym =

Muradym Мурадым
- Village
- Location within Bashkortostan Location within Russia
- Coordinates: 53°56′N 55°31′E
- Country: Russia
- Region: Bashkortostan
- District: Aurgazinsky District
- Time zone: UTC+5:00

Muradym (Russian: Мурадым; Bashkir: Мораҙым, Moraźım) is a rural locality (a village) in Mikhaylovsky Selsoviet, Aurgazinsky District, Bashkortostan, Russia. The population was 773 as of 2010. There are 12 streets.

There are a secondary school, a medical outpatient clinic, a cultural center, a library and a mosque in the village.

== Geography ==
Muradym is located 29 km southwest of Tolbazy (the district's administrative centre) by road. Belyakovka is the nearest rural locality.

== People ==
- Fanuza Nadrshina (1936)- Bashkir folklorist, professor
