= Toratau Congress Hall =

Building in Ufa, Bashkortostan, Russia

Coordinates: 54.7209°N 55.9287°E

Congress Hall
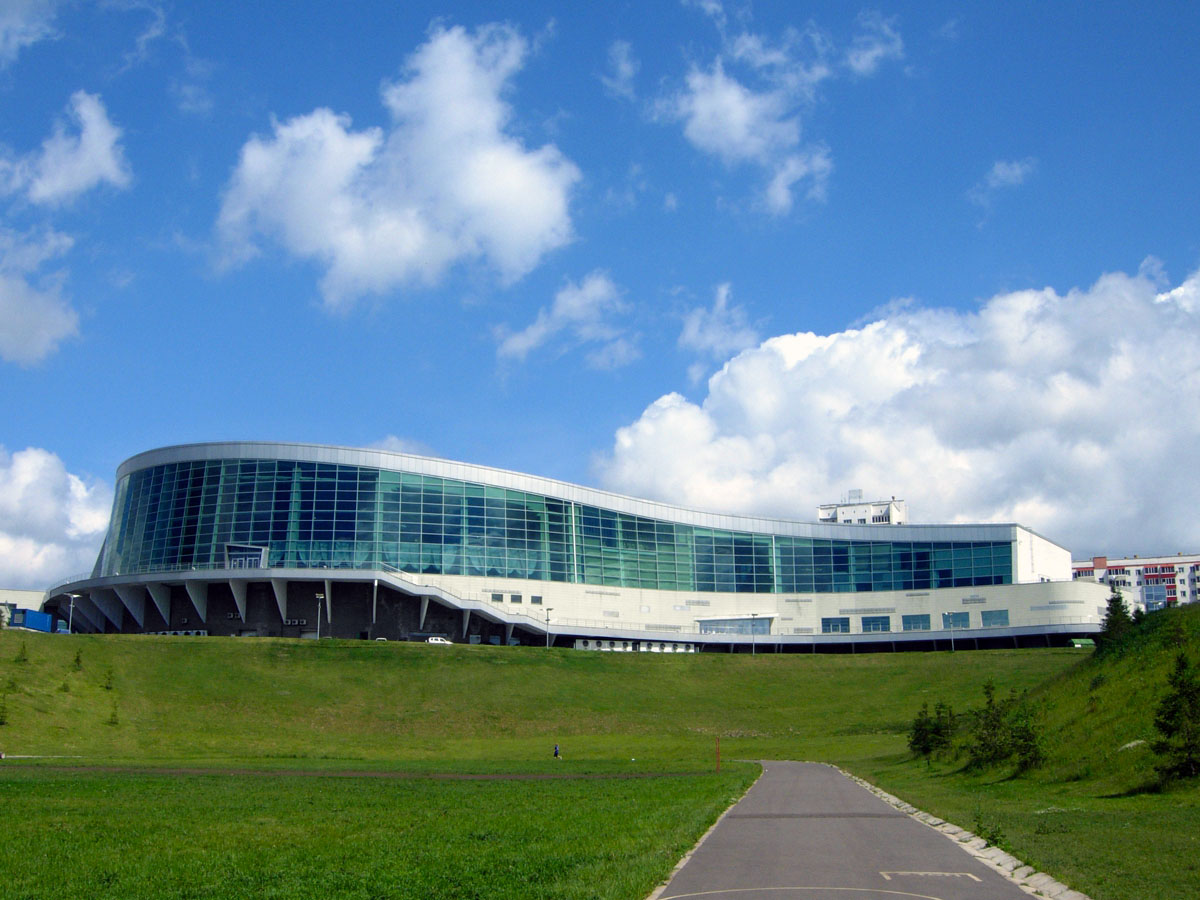
- Interactive map of the Congress Hall area
- Alternative names: Friendship House

General information
- Architectural style: Bashkir, modern national architecture
- Location: Russia, Bashkortostan, Ufa, Zaki Validi street
- Construction started: 2004
- Completed: 2007
- Renovated: 2013
- Owner: Government of the Republic of Bashkortostan

Design and construction
- Architects: Arai Kiyokazu, Rishat Mullagildin (Salawat Yulayev Award)

Toratau Congress Hall (Russian: Конгресс-холл «Торатау», Bashkir: «Торатау» конгресс-холлы) is the Government House in Ufa, built for the 450th anniversary of the accession of Bashkortostan to Russia.

Its architecture is characterized by the use of spatial, formal, coloristic prototypes of Bashkir culture for the formation of a modern national architecture. The epitome of this style became glazed facade with Bashkir ornament, looking at the Belaya River.

The architects are Rishat Mullagildin and Kiyokazu Arai. They were awarded the Salawat Yulayev Award.

The BRICS summit was held in Congress Hall in 2015.

== See also ==
- Republic House, Bashkortostan
