= Semyono-Pokrovskoye =

Semyono-Pokrovskoye Семёно-Петровское
- Selo
- Location within Bashkortostan Location within Russia
- Coordinates: 52°51′N 56°24′E
- Country: Russia
- Region: Bashkortostan
- District: Kugarchinsky District
- Time zone: UTC+5:00

Semyono-Pokrovskoye (Russian: Семёно-Петровское) is a rural locality (a selo) and the administrative centre of Irtyubaksky Selsoviet, Kugarchinsky District, Bashkortostan, Russia. The population was 348 as of 2010. There are 4 streets.

== Geography ==
Semyono-Pokrovskoye is located 30 km northwest of Mrakovo (the district's administrative centre) by road. Yumaguzino is the nearest rural locality.
