= Fanuza Nadrshina =

Bashkir folklorist & scientist (born 1936)

Fanuza Nadrshina (Фәнүзә Нәҙершина) (February 7, 1936) is a Bashkir folklorist, scholar and professor.

== Early life and education ==
Fanuza Nadrshina was born on February 7, 1936, in the village of Staro-Muradymovo, Aurgazinsky District of Bashkortostan.

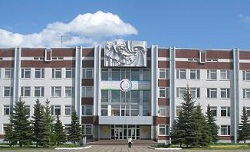
Sterlitamak Pedagogical Academy

In 1959, she graduated from the Faculty of Philology of the Pedagogical Academy in the city of Sterlitamak (from 2022 Sterlitamak branch of the Ufa University of Science and Technology).

== Career ==
Since 1962, she has been a researcher at the Institute of History, Language and Literature of the Bashkir Branch of the Academy of Sciences of the Soviet Union. Since 2005, she has been a chef scientific officer at the Department of Folkloristics of the Institute of Linguistics of the Urals Center of the Russian Academy of Sciences.

In 1960–1989, she took part in folklore expeditions to the regions of Bashkortostan, and to Kurgan, Orenburg, Perm, Sverdlovsk, Chelyabinsk (in 1977, 1988, 1989 as a leader) to the Bashkirs homeland since ancient times.

In 1971, Nadrshina presented her thesis "Aphoristic genres of Bashkir folklore: proverbs, sayings, riddles".

In 1998, she received her Doctorate in Philology, having presented her thesis "Unfairy-tale prose in folklore".

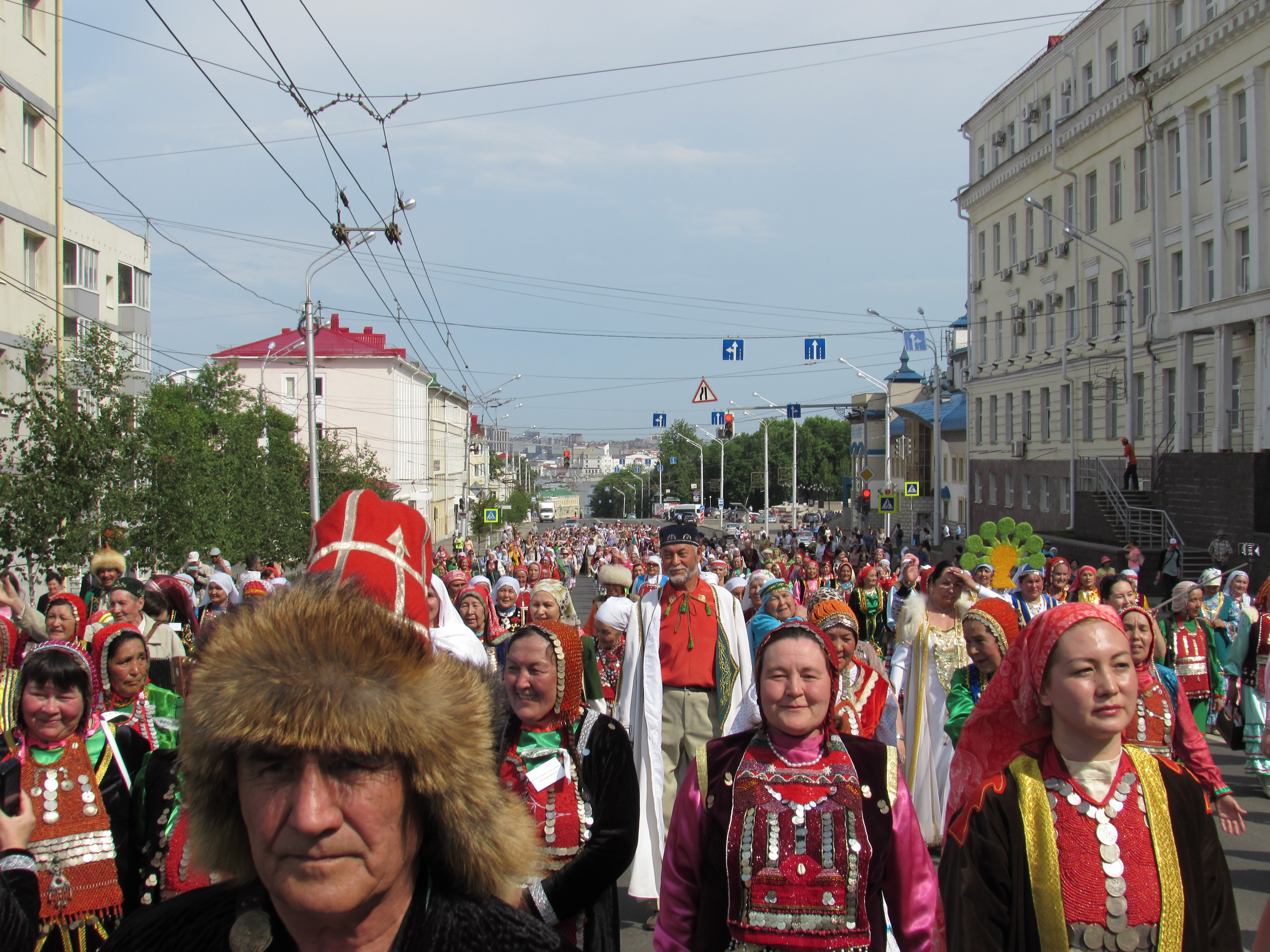
Folklore festival in Ufa.2016

Nadrshina studies Bashkir proverbs, sayings, riddles, legends, legends, epics, fairy tales and songs and is in development of the theory of the genres of Bashkir folklore.

She participated in the preparation for publication of the folklore books series "Bashkir Folk Art" (Башҡорт халыҡ ижады, "Bashkort Halyk Izhadi") with other scientists (A. I. Kharisov, N. T. Zaripov, L. G. Barag, M. M. Sagitov, and A. M. Suleimanov).

Nadrshina is the author of more than 200 scientific papers, including 30 books on Bashkort folklore and encyclopedia "Salavat Yulaev".

== See also ==
- Bashkir State University
- Muradym
- ru:Башкирское народное творчество (книжная серия)

== Main works ==
- Башҡорт халыҡ ижады. Йомаҡтар / Төҙ., инеш мәҡәлә һәм аңлатм. авт. Ф.А. Нәҙершина. Өфө: Башҡ. китап нәшр., 1979. 352 б. [Башкирское народное творчество. Загадки / Сост., авт. вступит. ст. и коммент. Ф.А. Надршина. Уфа: Башкнигоиздат, 1979. 352 с.]
- Нәҙершина Ф.А. Халыҡ һүҙе. Өфө: Башҡортостан китап нәшр., 1983. 160 б. [Слово народное. Уфа: Башкирское книжное изд-во, 1983. 160 с.
- Духовные сокровища. – Уфа, 1992. 78 с.
- Башкирские народные мелодии, песенно-плясовые игры. – Уфа, 1996. 78 с. (на башк. яз.)
- Башкирские народные песни, песни-предания / Авт.-сост. (на башк., русск. и англ. яз.) - Уфа: Китап, 1997. 288 с.
- Башкирские народные предания и легенды. Bashkort folk legends / Авт. – сост. (на баш., рус. и англ. яз.) - Уфа: Китап, 2001. 468 с.
- Башкирско-англо-русский словарь адекватных пословиц и поговорок. – Уфа: Китап, 2002. – 160 с. (в соавт.).
- «Урал-батыр»: Башкирский народный эпос / Авт. проекта, сост., ред., вступ. ст., коммент. (на башк., рус., англ. яз.). - Уфа: Информреклама, 2003. 465с.
- Память народная (исторические корни и жанровые особенности башкирских народных преданий и легенд). (монография) - Уфа: Гилем, 2006. 320 с. (на башк. яз.)
- Салават Юлаев в башкирском фольклоре (исследования и материалы). В 2 т. Т. 1: *Предания и легенды. Т. 2: Эпос, песни и баиты — Уфа: Информреклама, 2008. 526 с.
- Русско-башкирский словарь пословиц-эквивалентов — Уфа: Изд-во «Китап» им. З. Биишевой, 2008. 196с.
- Башкирские народные эпические сказания. Bashkir folk epic stoties/ Подготовка текстов, сост., вступ. ст., коммент., глоссарий, указатели (на башк., русск. и англ. яз.) - Уфа: «Китап», 2010. 280 с.
- Риүәйәт һәм легендаларҙа халыҡ тарихы.- Уфа: «Китап», 201!. 360 с.
- Башкирские исторические предания и легенды / Автор-сост.: Ф.А. Надршина. Уфа: Китап, 2015. 528
- Башҡорт халыҡ ижады. X том. Икенсе китап: мәҡәлдәр һәм әйтемдәр / Төҙ. Ф.А Нәҙершина, Э.М. Созинова. Өфө: Китап, 2016. 440 б. [Башкирское народное творчество. Том Х. Вторая книга: пословицы и поговорки / Сост. Ф.А. Надршина, Э.М. Созинова. Уфа: Китап, 2019. 440 с.].
- Tел гәүһәрҙәре=Жемчужины языка=Pearls of the language=Die Perlen der Sprach=Les perles de la langue. Башҡорт, рус, инглиз, немец, француз телдәрендә башҡорт халыҡ мәҡәл һәм әйтемдәре / [Төҙ. Ф.А. Нәҙершина, Э.М. Созинова; башҡортсанан тәрж. Ф.А. Нәҙершина, Э.М. Созинова, Ғ.Ғ. Шафиҡов, З.Ә. Рәхимова, Н.Н. Әхтәмова, Э.М. Нухова, Ф.С. Кудряшева, Р.Ҡ. Ғарипов, Л.М. Тоҡомбәтова]. – Өфө: Китап, 2020. – 216 б.
