= Salavat Galeyev =

Russian footballer and coach

Personal information
- Full name: Salavat Askhatovich Galeyev
- Date of birth: 13 October 1958 (age 68)
- Place of birth: Dzerzhinsk, Russian SFSR
- Height: 1.76 m (5 ft 9 1/2 in)
- Positions: Defender; midfielder

Team information
- Current team: FC Khimik Dzerzhinsk (assistant manager)

Senior career*
Years	Team	Apps	(Gls)
1977–1983	FC Khimik Dzerzhinsk	166	(6)
1984	FC Spartak Moscow	0	(0)
1984–1988	FC Khimik Dzerzhinsk	142	(6)
1989–1991	FC Nart Cherkessk	103	(14)
1992–1993	FC Khimik Dzerzhinsk	64	(2)
1995–1996	FC Torpedo-Viktoriya Nizhny Novgorod	36	(5)
1997	FC Kvarts Bor		
1997	FC Lokomotiv Mineralnye Vody	21	(0)
1999–2000	FC Start Yasentsy		

Managerial career
- 1998–2002: FC Khimik Dzerzhinsk (assistant)
- 2003–2008: FC Khimik Dzerzhinsk
- 2008: FC Nizhny Novgorod
- 2009–2011: FC Nizhny Novgorod (director of sports)
- 2012: FC Lokomotiv-2 Moscow (assistant)
- 2013–2014: FC Khimik Dzerzhinsk (assistant)
- 2014–2015: FC Khimik Dzerzhinsk
- 2015–: FC Khimik Dzerzhinsk (assistant)
- * Club domestic league appearances and goals

Salavat Askhatovich Galeyev (Russian: Салават Асхатович Галеев; born 13 October 1958) is a Russian professional football coach and a former player. He is an assistant manager with FC Khimik Dzerzhinsk.
