= Duvan-Mechetlino =

Duvan-Mechetlino Дуван-Мечетлино
- Selo
- Location within Bashkortostan Location within Russia
- Coordinates: 55°40′N 58°18′E
- Country: Russia
- Region: Bashkortostan
- District: Mechetlinsky District
- Time zone: UTC+5:00

Duvan-Mechetlino (Russian: Дуван-Мечетлино; Bashkir: Дыуан-Мәсетле, Dıwan-Mäsetle) is a rural locality (a selo) and the administrative centre of Duvan-Mechetlinsky Selsoviet, Mechetlinsky District, Bashkortostan, Russia. The population was 681 as of 2010. There are 12 streets.

== Geography ==
Duvan-Mechetlino is located 37 km (23 mi) south of Bolsheustyikinskoye (the district's administrative centre) by road. Gumerovo is the nearest rural locality.
