= Ufa State Aviation Technical University =

Technical university in Ufa, Russia

Coordinates: 54.725°N 55.9422°E

- Уфимский государственный авиационный технический университет
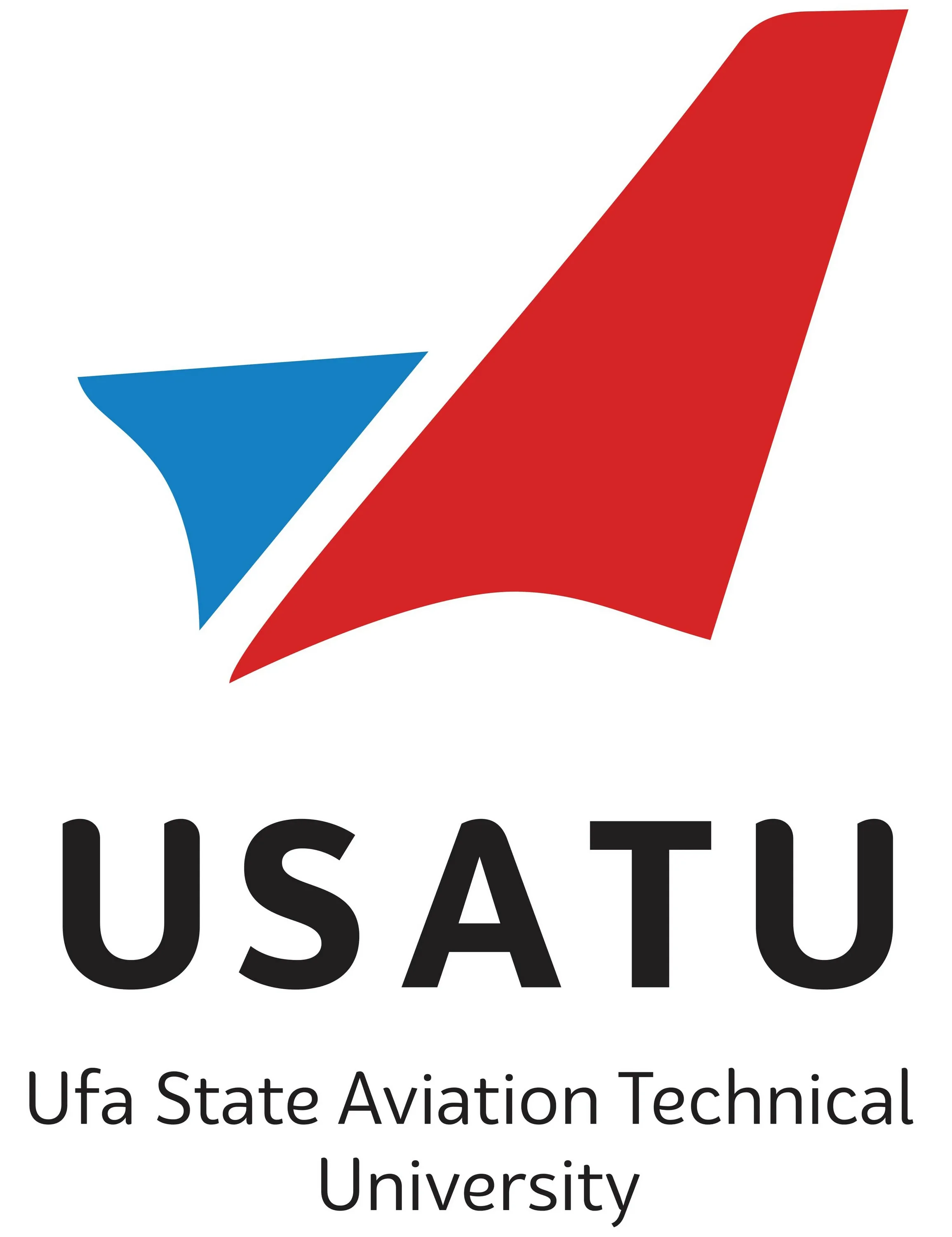
- Former names: Ufa Aviation Institute, Өфө дәүләт авиация техник университеты
- Type: Public
- Established: 1932
- Rector: Sergey Novikov
- Location: (Russia) Ufa, Russia
- Campus: urban
- Website: http://ugatu.ac.ru/

University rankings

Regional – Overall
- QS Emerging Europe and Central Asia: 251-300 (2022)

Ufa State Aviation Technical University (USATU) (Russian: Уфимский Государственный Авиационный Технический Университет, УГАТУ, Bashkir: Өфө дәүләт авиация техник университеты, ӨДАТУ, romanized: Öfö däwlät aviatsiä texnik universitetı, ÖDATU) was a state higher school, located in Ufa, Bashkortostan, Russia. Ufa State Aviation Technical University was founded in 1932 in Rybinsk, USSR (moved to Ufa during WWII). Nowadays, Ufa State Aviation Technical University represents a scientific and educational complex. There were 18 areas of study and 40 programs in its 7 faculties (full-time and by correspondence).

USATU is one of the best technical universities in Russia, producing specialists for the aviation industry.

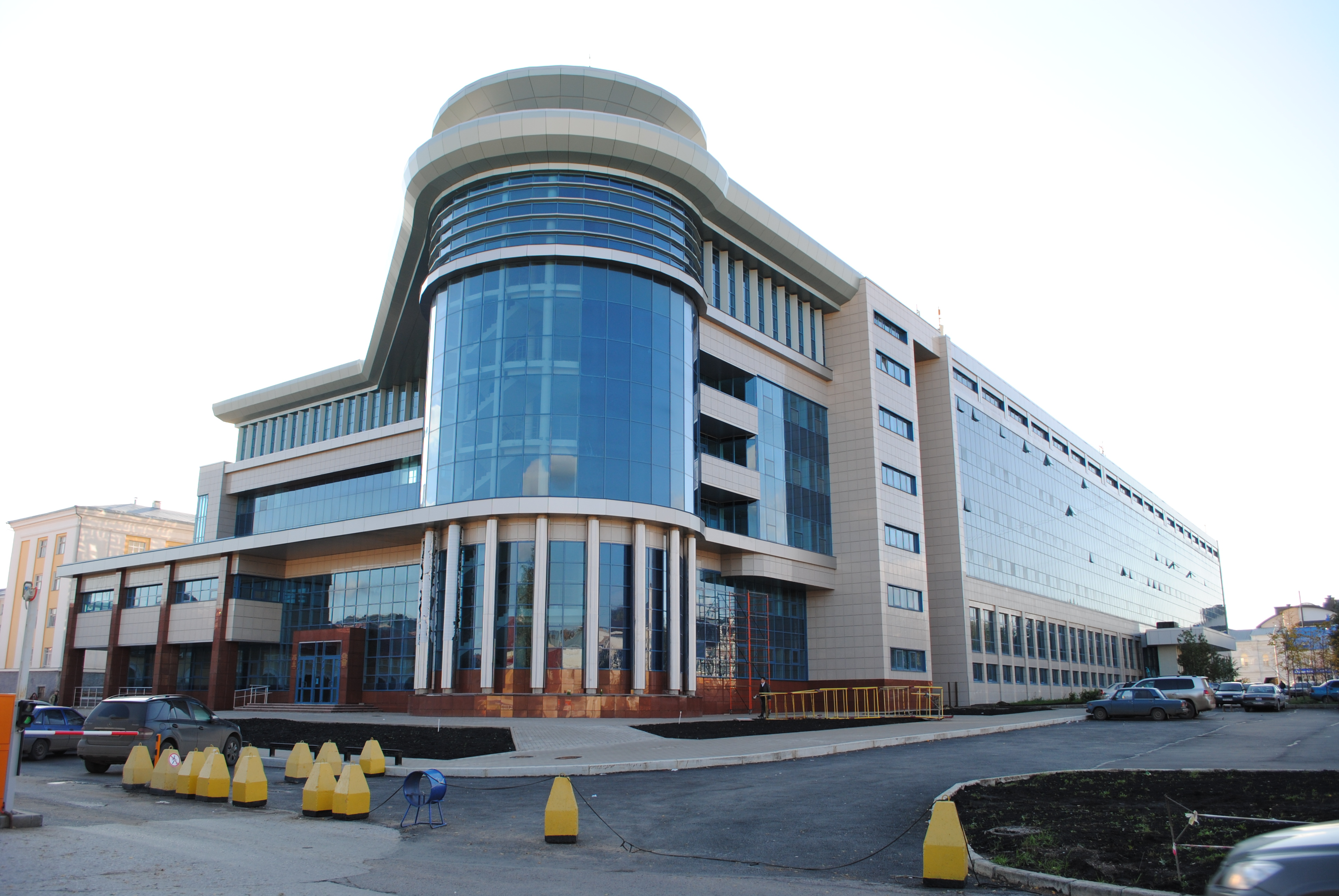
USATU buildings 9,8

More than 20,000 students studied at the university.

On July 8, 2022, the Ufa University of Science and Technology was established through the reorganization (merger) of Bashkir State University and Ufa State Aviation Technical University, which ended on November 1

== See also ==
- Education in Russia
- List of universities in Russia
