= Bashkir State University =

- Башкирский государственный университет Башҡорт дәүләт университеты
- Coat of arms of the Bashkir State University
- Other names: BashSU
- Former names: Ufa Teacher Institute (1909–1919); People's Education Institute (1919–1923); Practic Institute (1923–1929); Temiryazev Bashkir Pedagogical Institute (1929–1957); 40 years of Octouber Bashkir State University (1957–1991); Bashkir State University (since 1991)
- Motto: Russian: Первый среди равных
- Motto in English: First among Equals.
- Type: Public
- Established: 1909
- Rector: Vadim Zakharov (acting)
- Location: Ufa, Bashkortostan, Russia; 54°43′17″N 55°56′01″E
- Campus: Urban
- Website: www.bashedu.ru/en
- Building details
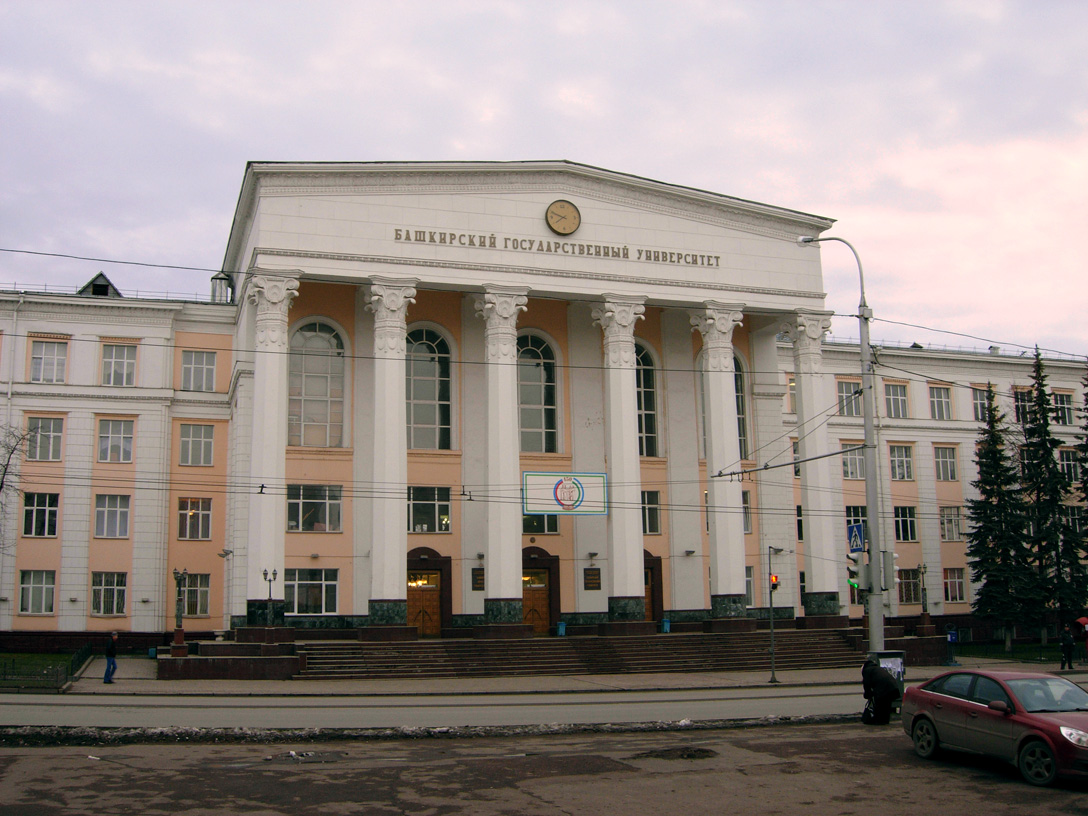
- Main campus on Zaki Validi street

University rankings

Regional – Overall
- QS Emerging Europe and Central Asia: 351-400 (2022)

Bashkir State University (Russian: Башкирский государственный университет, romanized: Bashkirskiy gosudarstvennyy universitet; Bashkir: Башҡорт дәүләт университеты, romanized: Başqort dəwlət universitetı) (now Ufa University of Science and Technology) was located in Ufa, Bashkortostan, Russia. Founded in 1909, it was a classical university of Russia.

On July 8, 2022, the Ufa University of Science and Technology was established through the reorganization (merger) of Bashkir State University and Ufa State Aviation Technical University, which ended on November 1.

== History ==
Originally established in 1909, BashSU was called Ufa Teachers' Institute. In 1919 it was transformed into the Institute of Public Education, and in 1929 into the Bashkir State Pedagogical Institute. At that time there were five faculties — physics and mathematics, geography, history, natural sciences, language and literature.

On July 20, 1957, the Council of Ministers of the USSR issued Resolution No.879 "On the organization of Bashkir State University on the basis of a functioning Bashkir State Pedagogical Institute." The rector was Shaikhulla Chanbarisov.

== Notable alumni ==
- Mustai Karim – Bashkir Soviet poet, writer and playwright.
- Maxim Tchoudov – biathlete.
- Alexander Kazhdan – Soviet-American Byzantinist.
- Hadiya Davletshina – Bashkir poet.
- Radiy Khabirov – the current Head of the Republic of Bashkortostan since 11 October 2018, also the Candidate of Law.
- Khairulla Murtazin – mathematician.
- Liya Shakirova – Soviet and Russian linguist.
- Rinad Yulmukhametov – mathematician.
- Fanuza Nadrshina – Bashkir folklorist

== Branch ==
The university has branches in the Republic of Bashkortostan cities of Sterlitamak, Birsk, Uchaly, Sibai and Neftekamsk.

== See also ==
- Education in Russia
- List of universities in Russia
