= Klyashevo =

Klyashevo (Russian: Кляшево, Bashkir: Келәш) may refer to the following rural localities in Russia:

- Klyashevo, Chishminsky District, Republic of Bashkortostan
- Klyashevo, Iglinsky District, Republic of Bashkortostan
