= Shaikhzada Babich =

Bashkir poet, writer, and playwright

Şəyexzada Möxəmmətzəkir ulı Babiç
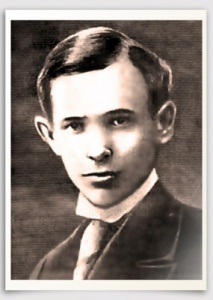
- Born: 14 January 1895; Əsən, Birsk county, Ufa Governorate, Russian Empire
- Died: 28 March 1919 (aged 24); Yılayır, Bashkir Autonomous Soviet Socialist Republic, USSR
- Citizenship: Russian Empire
- Education: Ğəliyə (madrasa), Ufa
- Occupations: poet, writer and politician
- Writing career
- Language: Old Bashkir, Bashkir (since 1917)
- Notable works: Ballad "The Bug" (1916) The poem "Gazaz" (1916) The cycle of epigrams "Kitabennas"
- Website: encycl.bash-portal.ru/babich_sh.htm

Shaikhzada Muhametzakirovich Babich (Russian: Шайхзада Мухаметзакирович Бабич; Bashkir: Шәйехзада Мөхәмәтзакир улы Бабич, romanized: Şəyexzada Möxəmmətzakir ulı Babiç; 14 January 1895 – 28 March 1919) was a Bashkir poet, writer and playwright. He is considered a classic author of Bashkir national literature. He was a member of the Bashkir national liberation movement, and a member of the Bashkir government (1917–1919).

== Biography ==
Shaikhzada Muhametzakirovich Babich was born in the village of Əsən, in the Ufa Governorate of what was then the Russian Empire, on 14 January 1895. Əsən had historically been part of the Köyök Qañlı canton (now Dyurtyulinsky District of Bashkortostan). He studied his primary education in his native village, in a madrasa directed by his father, Muhametzakir, with a Russian-appointed mullah from the Əsən mahallah. In 1910, he travelled the Kazakh Steppe and taught Kazakh children.

Between 1911 and 1916, Babich studied in the Ğəliyə madrasa in Ufa, and became deeply interested in literature during his studies. He participated in literary and musical circles, and published manuscripts in the madrasa publication Parlak. After graduation, he went to Troitsk to work as a teacher, a period during which he also worked for the magazine Akmulla.

Most of Babich's literary work was created in the Old Bashkir, and his works were published in Tatar magazines and newspapers. Babich began to write poetry in the Bashkir language in 1917.

He lived in Ufa for a short time during the summer of 1917, and then moved to Orenburg, where he worked for the satirical magazine Carmack (lit. 'Rod').

Babich became more invested in the Bashkir liberation movement in the autumn of 1917, when he became member of a party for the Bashkir movement and worked as a secretary of the Bashkir Central Shuro, as well as working as the editor of the newspaper Bashkort, and head of the youth organization of the Bashkirs, Тулҡын (Tulqın) (meaning "Wave").

He worked as a war correspondent in 1918–1919, following Bashkir troops into combat.

He only published one book in his lifetime, a collection of poems entitled Blue Songs, Young Bashkortostan, released in 1918 in Orenburg.

On 25 February 1919, he was appointed an employee of the department of the Bashkir Soviet press Bashrevkoma.

On 28 March 1919, during the transition of the Bashkir Army to the Red Army, Shaikhzada Babich was brutally murdered by a member of the Red Army in the village of Yılayır Yılayır District, in what had become the Bashkir Autonomous Soviet Socialist Republic. He was only 24 years old.

== Works ==
- Ballad "Bug" (1916)
- The poem "Gazaz" (1916)
- The cycle of epigrams "Kitabennas"

== Literature on Shaikhzada Babich ==
- Bikbaev R. “Sh. Babich: Life and Work”. Ufa, Bashkir Book Publishing House, 1981. 319 pages (in Bashkir)
- Bikbaev R. “Shaikhzada Babich: Life and Work”. Ufa, “Kitap,” 1995. 303 pages (in Russian)
- Bikbaev R. “Shaikhzada Babich”. Poems, Article, Photo Album. Ufa, 1995 (in Russian and Bashkir)
- Bikbaev R. “Winged Babich”, “Belskie Prostory,” 2005 (in Russian)
- Bikbaev R. “The Creative Path of Shaikhzada Babich in the Memory of His People”, “Problems of Oriental Studies,” 2014 (in Russian)
- Bikbaev R. “Shaikhzada Babich: Life and Work” (Series: Outstanding Personalities of Bashkortostan). Ufa, “Kitap,” 2020. 224 pages (in Russian)

== Citations ==
- Şiğirlär. X. Ğosman kereş süze.— Qazan: Tatkitap näşr., 1958. - 155 b.
- Haylanma əśərðər. - Öfö 1958.
- In Russian translation: Selected poems. - Ufa 1966.
