= Garipov =

Garipov (Russian: Гарипов) is a Tatar masculine surname, its feminine counterpart is Garipova. It may refer to

== Garipov ==
- Emil Garipov (born 1991), Russian ice hockey goaltender
- Ilnur Garipov (born 2000), Russian Paralympic swimmer
- Rami Garipov (1932–1977), national poet of Bashkortostan

== Garipova ==
- Dina Garipova (born 1991), Tatar born-Russian singer
