= Idrisov =

Idrisov is a surname used mainly by Muslim people in post-Soviet countries. It is derived as a Russian-language patronymic from the given name Idris and may refer to the following notable people:

- Abukhadzhi Idrisov (1918–1983), Chechen sniper of the Soviet Army in World War II
- Farid Idrisov (born 1954), Russian composer of Bashkir origin, known as one of authors of the National Anthem of the Republic of Bashkortostan
- Mikhail Idrisov (born 1988), Russian sprinter
- Erlan Idrissov (Idrisov) (born 1959), Kazakh politician, Foreign Minister of the Republic of Kazakhstan
