= Khanifa Iskandarova =

- Ханифа Исканда́рова
- Born: Khanifa Sirazhevna Iskandarov; 20 March 1928; Arkaulovo, Mesyagutovo, Bashkir Autonomous Soviet Socialist Republic, Russian SFSR, Soviet Union
- Died: 4 September 2020 (aged 92); Arkaulovo, Bashkortostan, Russia
- Occupation: Educator
- Awards: Hero of Socialist Labour; People's Teacher of the USSR; Order of Lenin

Khanifa Sirazhevna Iskandarova (Russian: Ханифа Сиражевна Исканда́рова; Bashkir: Хәнифә Сиражи ҡыҙы Искәндәрова; 20 March 1928 – 4 September 2020) was a Soviet and Russian educator who taught biology from 1955 to 1991. She taught at the Meshchegarov Secondary School, the Turnalinskaya School and the Maloyazskaya Secondary School. Iskandarova was a deputy of the eighth and ninth convocations of the Soviet of the Union of the Supreme Soviet of the Soviet Union from 1970 to 1979 and was elected a member of the Committee of Soviet Women on three occasions. She was named a Hero of Socialist Labour, a People's Teacher of the USSR and was a recipient of the Order of Lenin.

== Early life and education ==
Iskandarova was born in the village of Arkaulovo, Mesyagutovo, Bashkir Autonomous Soviet Socialist Republic (today the Salavatsky District, Bashkortostan) on 20 March 1928. She was part of a family of teachers and was Baskhir. Iskandarova's seven years of education at the village elementary school ended in 1942 and she began working as an accountant on a collective farm. She enrolled at the Mesyagutovskoye Pedagogical School (renamed to the Bashkir Mesyagutovskoye Teachers' Institute and today called the Mesyagutovskoye Pedagogical College) in 1944 before going on to the Ufa Pedagogical Institute (today the Bashkir State Pedagogical University). Iskandarova graduated from the institute in 1949.

== Career ==
She began her teaching career in 1949. Iskandarova worked as a biology teacher at the Arkaulovskaya Secondary School in the Salavat District, Bashkir ASSR. She later worked at the Meshchegarov Secondary School from 1955 to 1956, at Turnalinskaya School and Maloyazskaya Secondary School from 1956 to 1961, and finally returned as a biology teacher at Arkaulovskaya Secondary School from 1962 to 1991. Iskandarova left the school in 1991 and retired, becoming heavily involved in community service. She was the leader of a young naturalist's club and equipped the biology laboratory. Iskandarova was the manager of the school's experimental plot of seedlings, of which the work to aim to increase the yield of cereals and vegetables in the region from the plot was presented at the Exhibition of Achievements of National Economy (VDNKh) seven times between 1967 and 1974. She ensured that the curriculum was connected to reality, conducted classes in the fields and farms of the Sargamysh state farm and gave lectures and provided reports to the farm's employees.

Iskandarova was a public speaker, doing so at party and teacher conferences as well at congresses and at meetings of district and national business associations. From 1970 to 1979, Iskandarova was an elected deputy of the eighth and ninth convocations of the Soviet of the Union of the Supreme Soviet of the Soviet Union. In 1968, she was an delegate to the first All-Union Congress of Teachers following a lengthy and rigorous selection process. Iskandarova was later to be a delegate to the 24th Congress of the Communist Party of the Soviet Union in 1971. She was elected to the Committee of Soviet Women as a member on three occasions. Iskandarova died in Arkaulovo, Bashkortostan on 4 September 2020.

== Awards ==
She was the recipient of gratitude and certificates of honour from the nation's and the republic's top officials. Iskandarova was a recipient of the title of Honoured School Teacher of the RSFSR on 6 December 1967. She was given the title of Hero of Socialist Labour with the Order of Lenin and the "Hammer and Sickle" gold medal on 1 July 1968. Iskandarova was named an People's Teacher of the USSR on 20 July 1982 and also an Honoured Teacher of the Bashkir ASSR among receiving medals. A bust of her was unveiled in Arkaulovo on 2 October 2025.
