= Mustai Karim =

Soviet writer (1919–2005)

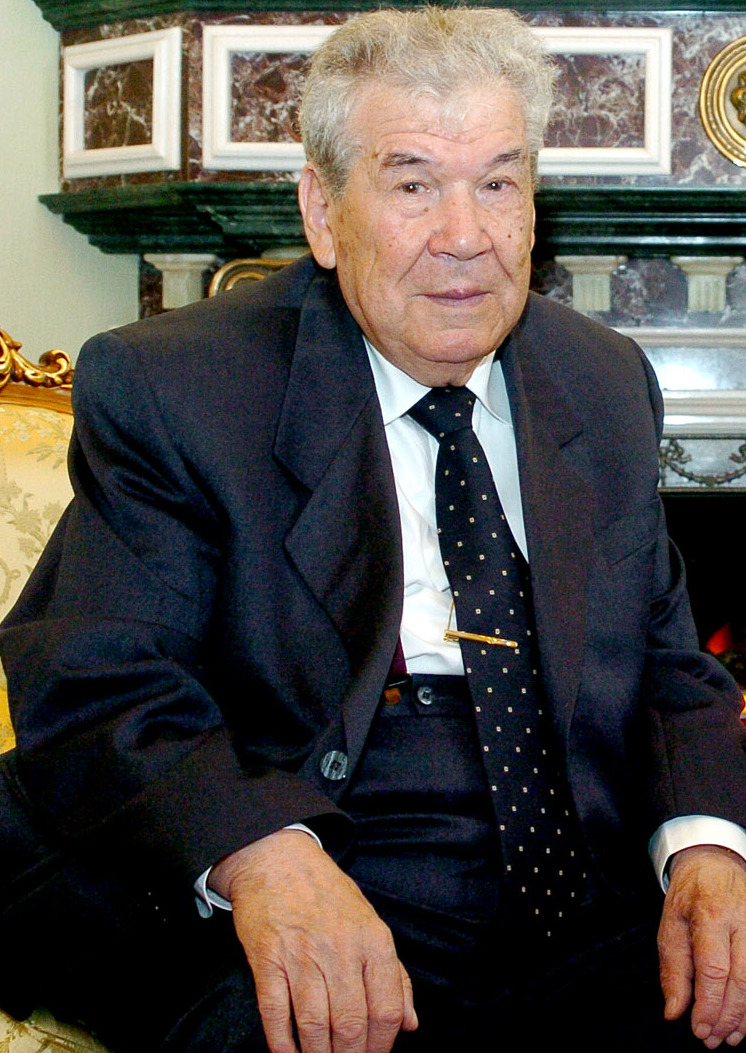
- Karim in 2004
- Born: Mustafa Safich Karimov; 20 October 1919; Klyashevo village, Safarovskaya parish, Ufa county, Ufa Governorate, Russian SFSR
- Died: 21 September 2005 (aged 85); Ufa, Bashkortostan, Russia
- Citizenship: Soviet, Russian
- Education: Bashkir State University
- Occupations: Poet, novelist, playwright
- Website: mustaykarim.narod.ru

Mustai Karim (Bashkir: Мостай Кәрим; born Mustafa Safich Karimov, Bashkir: Мостафа Сафа улы Кәримов; 20 October 1919 – 21 September 2005) was a Bashkir Soviet poet, writer and playwright. He was named People's Poet of the Bashkir ASSR (1963), Hero of Socialist Labour (1979), and winner of the Lenin Prize (1984) and the USSR State Prize (1972).

== Biography ==
Karim was born on 20 October 1919 and in the village of Klyashevo (now in Chishminsky District, Bashkortostan) in an ethnic Bashkir peasant family. In 1941, he graduated from Bashkir State University, Faculty of Language and Literature. After graduation, he joined the Red Army and was sent to Novocherkassk Higher Military Command School of Communications. In May 1942, with the rank of second lieutenant sent to the 17th Motor Rifle Brigade Chief of Communications artdiviziona. In August 1942, Karim spent about six months in hospitals recuperating from severe wounds. After recovery, he returned to the forefront as a correspondent for the front-line newspapers. He became a Member of the CPSU in 1944. Throughout the Great Patriotic War Karim was at the front, and he was a correspondent for the front-line newspapers For the honor of the motherland (Ватан намусы өчен), Soviet Soldier (Sovet sugyshchysy) in Tatar.

Karim began writing in the mid-1930s. In 1938 his first book of poems, "The detachment moved", was published. The second, "Voices of Spring", was published in 1941. After that, he published more than 100 poems and prose collections, and more than 10 dramatic works.

From 1951 to 1962, Karim was the chairman of the joint BASSR. From 1962 to 1984 he served as secretary of the Union of Soviet Writers. He was a member of the Writers' Union from 1940.

His prolific literary work, Karim, was complemented by his involvement in various social activities. From 1955 to 1980, he was elected as a delegate to the congress of the CPSU. He served as a deputy to the Supreme Soviet of the RSFSR during the 4th to 11th convocations. Karim held positions such as Deputy Chairman of the Presidium of the Supreme Soviet of the RSFSR and Deputy Chairman of the Supreme Soviet of the RSFSR. He also served as a deputy of the BASSR Supreme Soviet for many years. He held the esteemed position of Chairman of the Bashkir Peace Committee and was a member of the Committee on Lenin and State Prizes of the USSR Council of Ministers. Karim's contributions extended to being a member of the Presidential Council of the Republic of Bashkortostan.

He died after suffering a heart attack on 21 September 2005 at the Republican Cardiological Clinic in Ufa. He was buried at the Mohammedan Cemetery in Ufa.

== Most famous works ==
Collections of poetry and poems, "Black Water", "Return", "Europe-Asia", "time plays", "Country Ajgul", "The Kidnapping of Girl," "On the night of the lunar eclipse", "Salavat. Seven dreams through reality", " Do not leave the fire, Prometheus! "Novel" The Joy of our house, "" trivet "," Pardon, "Long, Long Childhood ". Works by Mustai Karim have been translated into dozens of languages of Russia and the world (Kyrgyz, Slovenian, Estonian etc.).

== Film adaptations ==
- Long, Long Childhood (2004)
- My Little Sister (2019)
- Taganok Squad (2019)

== Awards ==
- Hero of Socialist Labour (19 October 1979)
- Order "For Merit to the Fatherland" 2nd degree (9 November 2004) – for outstanding contribution to the development of Russian literature and many years of creative activity
- Order "For Merit to the Fatherland" 3rd degree (28 April 1995) – for services to the state, the progress made in labour, science, culture, art, and a great contribution to the strengthening of friendship and cooperation between the peoples
- Two Orders of Lenin (28 October 1967, 10 October 1979)
- Order of the Patriotic War, 1st degree (11 March 1985)
- Order of the Patriotic War, 2nd degree (17 July 1945)
- Two Orders of the Red Banner of Labour (8 June 1955, 28 November 1969)
- Order of Friendship of Peoples (16 November 1984)
- Order of the Red Star (25 September 1944)
- Order of the Badge of Honour (22 March 1949)
- Honored Art Worker of the RSFSR (1982)
- People's Poet of the Bashkir ASSR (1963)
- Honorary Academician of the Academy of Sciences of Bashkortostan (1992)
- Lenin Prize (1984) – for the tragedy, "Do not leave the fire, Prometheus," and for the novel "The Long, Long Childhood"
- USSR State Prize (1972) – for the collection of poems "vosled Years" (1971)
- RSFSR State Prize of Stanislavsky (1967) – for the play "The Night of the Lunar Eclipse", staged at the Bashkir ADT
- Republican Prize Salavat Yulaev (1967) – for the 1st volume of "Selected Works"
- International Prize MASholokhov in Literature and Art (1999)
- Honorary Diploma, Hans Christian Andersen Award (1978) – for the book "Waiting for news"

== Literature on Mustai Karim ==
- Bikbaev R. Voice of the People [Text] / R. Bikbaev // Belskie Prostory. — 1999. — No. 10. — pp. 3–9.
- Bikbaev R. Mustai Karim’s School [Text] / R. Bikbaev // Belskie Prostory. — 2002. — No. 12. — pp. 108–112.
- Bikbaev R. The Era of Mustai Karim [Text] / R. Bikbaev // Bashkortostan. — 2009. — Oct 21. — p. 3.
- Bikbaev R. On the Road, Thoughts in Songs [Text] / R. Bikbaev // Belskie Prostory. — 2009. — No. 10. — pp. 124–126.
- Bobrov A. Golden Birch Leaf. Bashkir Notes [Text] / A. Bobrov // Sovetskaya Rossiya. — 2009. — No. 110, Oct. 8. — pp. 4–5.
- Bolgarova Yu. He Didn’t Teach About Life, He Spoke About It: On the 90th Anniversary of Mustai Karim’s Birth [Text] / Yu. Bolgarova // Vechernyaya Ufa. — 2009. — No. 200, Oct. 16. — p. 2.
- Valeev I. I. Mustai Karim’s Pedagogy [Text] / I. I. Valeev; 2nd ed., rev. and add.; foreword by Bikbaev R. — Ufa: Kitap, 2003. — 224 p.
- Valeev I. I. Mustai Karim: Warrior, Poet, Citizen. — Moscow: Heroes of the Fatherland, 2004. — 584 p.
- Valeev I. I. The Poet’s Bridges [Text] / I. Valeev // Istoki. — 2008. — No. 41. — p. 5 (conclusion).
- Valeev I. Great Friendship: Mustai Karim and Alexander Filippov: On the 90th Anniversary of the Classic Writer [Text] / I. Valeev // Istoki. — 2009. — No. 41, Oct. 14. — p. 8.
- Valeev I. Mustai Karim on Family Pedagogy [Text] / I. Valeev // Istoki. — 2008. — No. 36. — p. 12.
- Valeev I. Mustai Karim and Rasul Gamzatov [Text] / I. Valeev // Istoki. — 2009. — June 17. — p. 4: ill.
- Valeev I., Valeeva S. Bibliographic Index of Some Scientific, Publicist Works, and Literary Creations about the Life and Work of Mustai Karim (For the Poet’s 100th Anniversary). — Ufa: Dialog, 2019. — 116 p.
- Dokuchaeva A. Birds from Mustai’s Heart [Text] / A. Dokuchaeva // Respublika Bashkortostan. — 2008. — Oct. 22. — p. 1.
- Dokuchaeva A. “Inspiration Doesn’t Come Without Work” [Text] / A. Dokuchaeva // Respublika Bashkortostan. — 2009. — April 28. — p. 3: ill.
- Ziganshin K. The Sage from Klyashevo [Text] / K. Ziganshin // Belskie Prostory. — 2006. — No. 10. — pp. 166–170.
- Kilmukhametova A. Mustai Karim’s Wartime Poetry Helps in Tough Times [Text] / A. Kilmukhametova // Respublika Bashkortostan. — 2009. — Feb. 13. — p. 4.
- Merzabekov M. Meetings with Mustai Karim [Text] / M. Merzabekov // Belskie Prostory. — 2006. — No. 10. — pp. 150–165.
- Nikolenko I. He Warms the Earth [Text] / I. Nikolenko // Belskie Prostory. — 2006. — No. 10. — pp. 171–175.
- Novakovich A. In His Songs—Our Thoughts Too [Text] / A. Novakovich // Istoki. — 2009. — No. 21. — p. 5: ill.
- Salimova L. The Master’s Voice Resonates Through the Years... [Text] / L. Salimova // Molodezhnaya Gazeta. — 2008. — No. 41. — p. 5.

== Memorials ==
Karim's name was given to the National Youth Theatre of the Republic of Bashkortostan (Ufa) and a street in Ufa. High school number 158 was also named after Karim. At the building where he lived, a memorial plaque was placed in honor of Karim. In Moscow, casting was completed of a monument to Karim in bronze. It will be located in Ufa, in front of the House of Trade Unions. It is not just a monument, but also include a story featuring characters from the works of the writer. The height of the monument is 6 meters in length. Part of the monument will be cast separately, and it will be assembled and welded in Ufa.

There was also a Sukhoi SSJ100 operated by Aeroflot named after Karim. However, the plane crashed on May 5, 2019, as Flight 1492.
