= Ravil Bikbaev =

Bashkir poet and writer, literary scholar, and public figure (1938–2019)

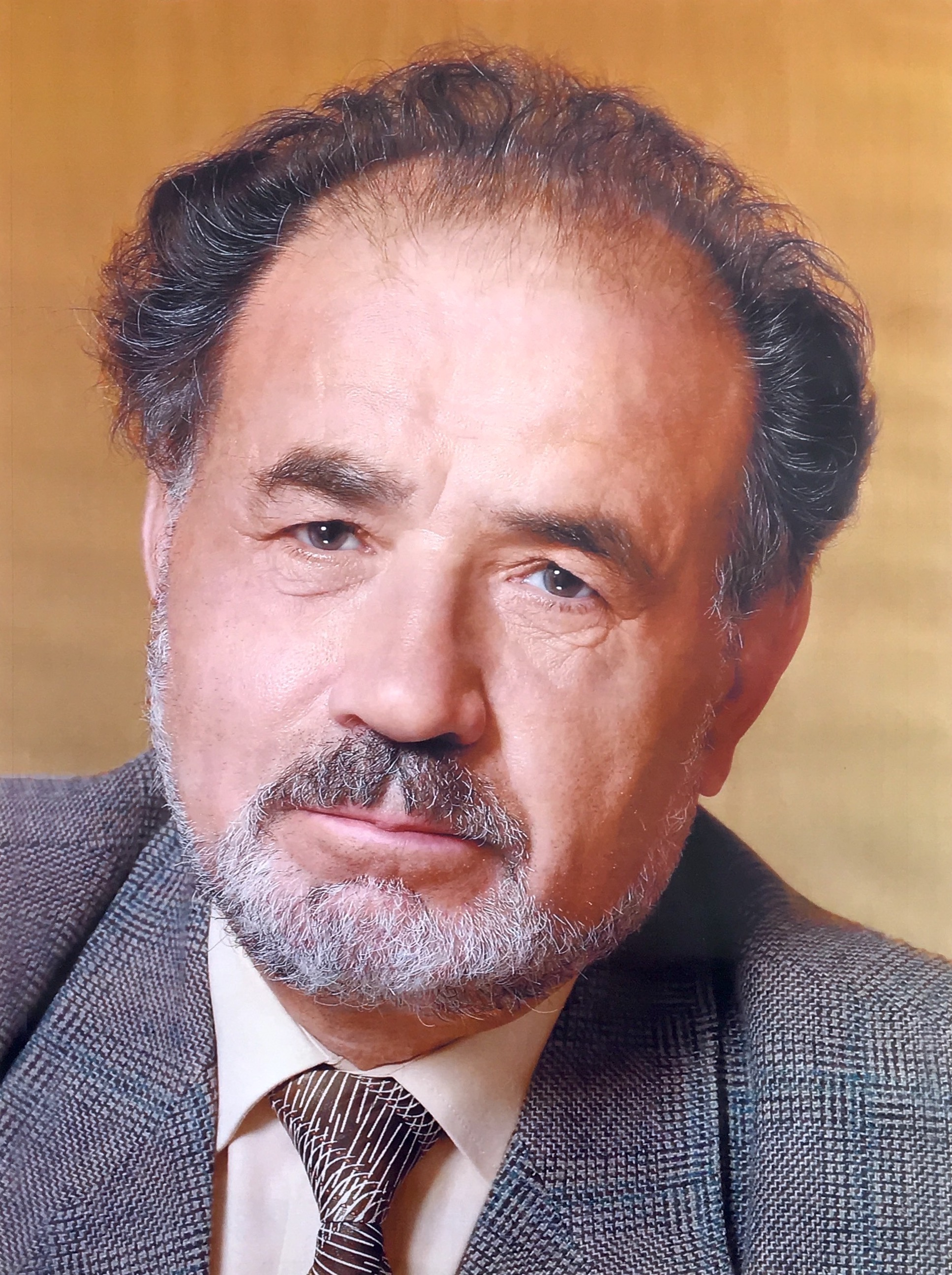
- Born: December 12, 1938; Verkhny Kunakbay, Pokrovsky District, Orenburg Oblast, Soviet Union (now Perevolotsky District, Russia)
- Died: April 23, 2019 (aged 80); Ufa, Bashkortostan, Russia
- Resting place: Muslim Cemetery, Ufa
- Occupations: Poet; publicist; literary scholar; public figure
- Spouse: Farida Yakupovna Bikbaeva
- Writing career
- Language: Bashkir, Russian
- Years active: 1957–2019
- Genres: Poetry; publicism; scholarly research

Ravil Tukhvatovich Bikbayev (Russian: Равиль Тухватович Бикбаев; Bashkir: Рауил Төхфәт улы Бикбаев, romanized: Rawil Töxfät ulı Bikbaev; 12 December 1938 – 23 April 2019) was a Bashkir poet and writer, literary scholar, and public figure. He was honored as the People's Poet of Bashkortostan in 1993 and held a doctorate in philological sciences since 1996. Bikbaev was also recognized as a Distinguished Scientist of the Republic of Bashkortostan (1992), a Distinguished Cultural Worker of the Chuvash Republic, and an Honorary Citizen of Ufa (since 1999). In 2009, he became a Corresponding Member of the Academy of Sciences of the Republic of Bashkortostan. Additionally, he was a professor and served as a deputy and chairman of the Committee on Education, Science, Culture, Sports, and Youth Affairs in The State Assembly – Kurultai of the Republic of Bashkortostan (2008–2013). Bikbaev was also one of the co-authors of the National Anthem of the Republic of Bashkortostan.

== Education ==
Bikbaev was born on December 12, 1938, in the village of Verkhny Kunakbay, Perevolotsky District, Orenburg Oblast. In 1953, he graduated from a seven-year school, and from 1953 to 1957, he studied at the Ak-Bulak Pedagogical College. He graduated from the Philological Faculty of the Bashkir State University in 1962. After completing his university studies, he pursued postgraduate education at the Institute of History, Language, and Literature of the Bashkir Branch of the USSR Academy of Sciences from 1962 to 1965. Starting in 1965, he worked as a research fellow in the Department of Literature at the Institute of History, Language, and Literature of the Ufa Science Center of the Russian Academy of Sciences. In 1966, he defended his candidate's dissertation on the topic "The Contemporary Bashkir Poem", and in 1996, he defended his doctoral dissertation.

== Career ==
From 1995 to 2011, Bikbaev served as the chairman of the Union of Writers of the Republic of Bashkortostan. He was also a secretary and co-chairman of the Union of Writers of Russia. Between 2008 and 2013, he held the position of chairman of the Committee on Education, Science, Culture, Sports, and Youth Affairs of The State Assembly – Kurultai of the Republic of Bashkortostan.

Bikbaev began his creative career during his student years and had his first works published in 1957. In 1962, his first poem, "The Station", was published in the magazine Agidel. In "The Station", both the fate of the country and that of his homeland—his village, the hearth, neighbors, and the generation that endured the hardships of wartime—are personified. The poem also reflects the fate of a woman who saw her husband off to war from that station and is now sending her son to the army. The theme of war, first raised in "The Station", remained one of the central themes throughout Bikbaev's work. His first poetry collection, "Steppe Horizons", was published in 1964, followed by other works that earned him recognition in both the poetic and academic worlds.

Bikbaev authored over 100 poetic, literary, and scholarly works. His creativity was characterized by historical thinking and a desire to philosophically generalize life's phenomena. Central themes in his work included the native language, culture, and the historical fate of the people. Pressing contemporary issues were reflected in the poetic monologue "Letter to My People" (1982), the poems "I Thirst—Give Me Water!" ("Һыуһаным, һыуҙар бирегеҙ!", 1989), and "The Market Axe" (1993). Bikbaev's poetic language was noted for its vivid imagery, subtle psychological depth, and original symbolism.

Bikbaev's lyrical poem "I Thirst—Give Me Water!" written in the form of an address to the people ("hitap"), became not only one of the author's key works but also a cornerstone of 20th-century Bashkir literature. Written during his travels in 1987–1988, the poem programmatically raises questions about the preservation and development of the natural, historical, and cultural heritage of Bashkortostan. During his mental "journeys", Bikbaev also reflects on the famous Bashkortostan Shikhans, unique natural monuments in the southern part of Bashkortostan, whose fate deeply concerned him.

As a researcher, Bikbaev was always deeply interested in the poetic and spiritual world of his contemporaries and predecessors, as well as in the most pressing issues regarding the development of Bashkir poetry and literature. He published numerous studies on contemporary Bashkir poetry and philosophical lyricism, including "Time. Poet. People" (1986), "The Evolution of Contemporary Bashkir Poetry" (1991), "Shaikhzada Babich: Life and Work" (1995), and "The Poet’s Word is the Poet’s Conscience" (1997). This is just a partial list of his literary research and criticism, published not only in Ufa but also in Moscow.

Many of Bikbaev's works have been translated into German, Turkish, Ukrainian, Kazakh, Yakut, Chuvash, Karakalpak, Altai, and other languages. His writings and books are housed in major libraries around the world, including the Library of Congress in the United States and the National Library of Australia.

Bikbaev played an active role in the cultural and public life of the Republic of Bashkortostan, frequently publishing sharp publicist and critical articles in the press. His publicist book, The Year of Man (2003), which includes his articles, speeches, and interviews, reflects the spiritual transformation of a renewed Bashkortostan, the complex spiritual quests of his contemporaries, and the urgent issues of modern life, interwoven in the dialectical unity and conflict of the second half of the 20th century and the beginning of the new millennium.

In the 1990s and 2000s, Bikbaev traveled extensively, representing Bashkir literature in the United States, France, Turkey, South Korea, Germany, and CIS countries. His travels were documented in a collection of travel notes titled At Dawn, I Set Out (2002), which introduced a new genre to Bashkir literature.

In June 1999, Bikbaev was awarded the title of Honorary Citizen of Ufa.

In 2007 he was appointed a member of the Presidential Council of the Republic of Bashkortostan.

In 2008, Bikbaev was elected a deputy of the State Assembly – Kurultai of the Republic of Bashkortostan, where he chaired the Committee on Education, Science, Culture, Sports, and Youth Affairs. From 2008 to 2013, he actively participated in the drafting and improvement of legislative acts as a regional parliamentarian and chairman of the relevant committee.

The issues of the writer's relationship with time, morality, and the development paths of contemporary literature are addressed in Bikbaev's publicist work Dastan about Bashkortostan, published in 2013.

Bikbaev made a significant scholarly contribution to the research and preservation of the legacy of Rami Garipov. He also actively supported the commemoration of prominent Bashkir cultural figures, such as Mustai Karim, Zainab Biisheva, Zagir Ismagilov, Amir Abdrakhmanov, and others.

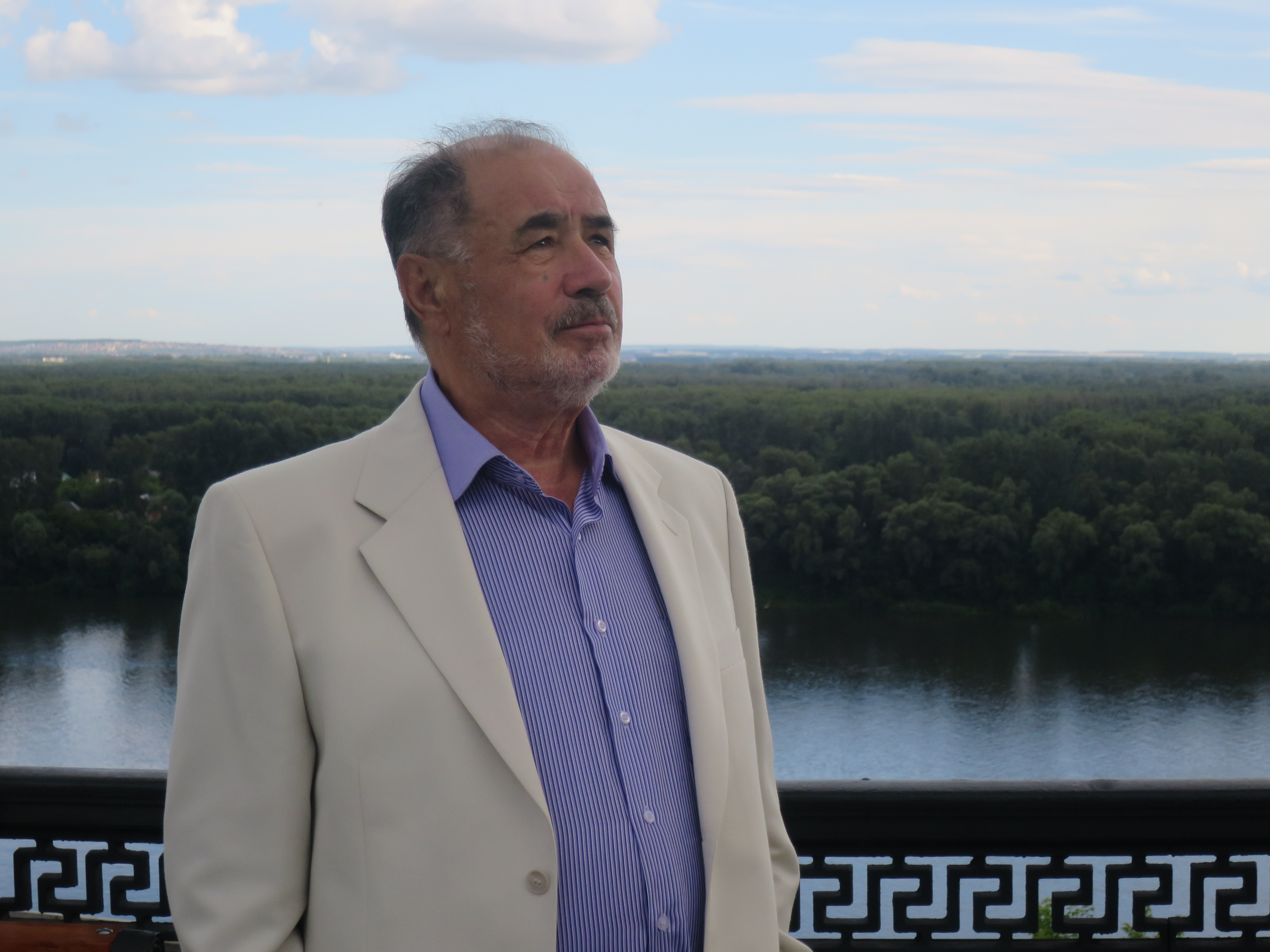
Caption: Ravil Bikbaev in Vatan Park. Photo from the family collection

Bikbaev restored the name of Shaikhzada Babich to Bashkir culture after decades of an unofficial ban on even mentioning Babich's name. Due to Bikbaev and his scholarly research in the field of Bashkir literary history, the works of Shaikhzada Babich were rediscovered.

Bikbaev died on April 23, 2019, at the age of 80 after a long illness, while being treated at Republican Clinical Hospital No. 2. He was buried at the Muslim Cemetery in Ufa.

The memory and cultural, creative, and scholarly legacy of Bikbaev have been immortalized in the Republic of Bashkortostan in accordance with the Decree of the Head of the Republic of Bashkortostan, R. F. Khabirov, dated October 1, 2019, No. UG-322, "On the Commemoration of People’s Poet of Bashkortostan, Ravil Bikbaev".

In 2019 and 2023, Bikbaev's family members donated documents, manuscripts, and photographs from his personal archive for permanent storage at the National Archive of the Republic of Bashkortostan. This was done to create a multimedia archive of materials related to the life, public, scholarly, and creative activities of the poet, philologist, publicist, and former chairman of the Writers’ Union of the Republic of Bashkortostan. Audio and video materials were also provided by the State Unitary Enterprise of the TV and Radio Company Bashkortostan. Approximately 2,000 documents underwent scientific and technical processing, all of which were cataloged, leading to the establishment of a personal archive collection (R-5383). The collection includes materials from Bikbaev's creative, academic, and public activities, including books, manuscripts, photographs, and audiovisual materials.

== Bibliography ==
=== Poetry and poems ===
- "Steppe Horizons". Poems and an epic. Ufa, Bashkir Book Publishing House, 1964. 76 pages (in Bashkir).
- "The Milky Way". Poems and an epic. Ufa, Bashkir Book Publishing House, 1967. 96 pages (in Bashkir).
- "Autobiography". Poems. Ufa, Bashkir Book Publishing House, 1969. 94 pages (in Bashkir).
- "Lyrics". Ufa, Bashkir Book Publishing House, 1971. 63 pages (in Bashkir).
- "Midlife". Poems and an epic. Ufa, Bashkir Book Publishing House, 1976. 142 pages (in Bashkir).
- "Singing Rocks". Poems. Moscow, "Sovremennik", 1978. 78 pages (in Russian).
- "Joyful Tidings". Poems. Ufa, Bashkir Book Publishing House, 1979. 96 pages (in Bashkir).
- "The Radiance of My Land". Poems. Ufa, Bashkir Book Publishing House, 1982. 79 pages (in Bashkir).
- "Dawn". Poems. Moscow, "Soviet Russia", 1982. 79 pages (in Russian).
- "Furrows". Poems and epics. Ufa, Bashkir Book Publishing House, 1985. 224 pages (in Bashkir).
- "Starry House". Poems. Moscow, 1985. 80 pages (in Russian).
- "My Destiny". Poems and epics. Ufa, Bashkir Book Publishing House, 1988. 240 pages (in Bashkir).
- "I Thirst—Give Me Water!" Epic and poems. Ufa, "Kitap", 1991. 158 pages (in Bashkir).
- "Everything Is on Our Conscience". Poetic letter. Ufa, "Kitap", 1991 (in Bashkir).
- "Sak-Sok". Poems and epics. Kazan, Tatar Book Publishing House, 1994. 271 pages (in Tatar).
- "Under the Sun and Moon" (Ай кургендей, кояш алғандай). Selected works. Ufa, "Kitap", 1998. 544 pages (in Bashkir).
- "One Hundred and One Hadiths". Part One. Ufa, 2001 (in Bashkir).
- "One Hundred and One Hadiths". Part Two. Ufa, 2002 (in Bashkir).
- "One Hundred and One Hadiths". Part Three. Ufa, 2003 (in Bashkir).
- "At Dawn, I Set Out" (in Bashkir).
- "The Flight of a Lone Bird". Ufa, 2005 (in Bashkir).
- "Can It Be Forgotten?" Kazan, 2008 (in Tatar).
- "Steppe Spring". Orenburg, 2008 (in Russian).
- "Three Hundred and Three Hadiths". Ufa, 2008 (in Russian and Bashkir).
- "The Cherished Word". Ufa, 2008 (in Russian).
- "The Flight of a Lone Bird". Ufa, 2008 (in Russian).
- "Ravil Bikbaev". Manual. Ufa, 2008 (in Bashkir).
- "Ravil Bikbaev". Manual. Ufa, 2008 (in Russian).
- "Collected Works in 6 Volumes". Ufa, 2008–2019 (in Russian and Bashkir).
- "Treasure: Poems and Epics". Ufa, 2010. 152 pages (in Bashkir).
- "Can It Be Forgotten?" Ufa, 2013 (in Bashkir).
- "Diaries". Book One. 14 November 1968—03.12.1999. Ufa, 2013. 768 pages (in Bashkir).
- "Diaries". Book Two. 1 January 2000—22 December 2009. Ufa, 2013. 744 pages (in Bashkir).
- "The Rider Azamat". Ufa, 2015. 104 pages (in Bashkir).
- "The Very First Miracle". Ufa, "Kitap", 2016. 272 pages (in Bashkir).
- "Diaries". Book Three. 6 January 2010—30 December 2016. Ufa, 2018. 560 pages (in Bashkir).
- "The Last Night" (Һуңғы төн). Ufa, 2018 (in Bashkir).
- "Seven Hundred and Seventy-Seven Hadiths". Ufa, 2018 (in Bashkir).

=== Scholarly works ===
- "Bibliography on Bashkir Literature and Literary Studies". Ufa, 1969. 335 pages (in Bashkir).
- "Poetic Chronicle of Time". Ufa, Bashkir Book Publishing House, 1980. 272 pages (in Bashkir).
- "Sh. Babich: Life and Work". Ufa, Bashkir Book Publishing House, 1981. 319 pages (in Bashkir).
- "Time. Poet. People". Moscow, "Sovremennik", 1986. 240 pages (in Russian).
- "The Evolution of Contemporary Bashkir Poetry". Moscow, "Nauka", 1991. 140 pages (in Russian).
- "Shaikhzada Babich: Life and Work". Ufa, "Kitap", 1995. 303 pages (in Russian).
- "Shaikhzada Babich". Poems, Article, Photo Album. Ufa, 1995 (in Russian and Bashkir).
- "The Poet’s Word is the Poet’s Conscience". Ufa, "Kitap", 1997. 512 pages (in Bashkir).
- "Anthology of Bashkir Poetry". Ufa, "Kitap", 2001. 816 pages (in Bashkir).
- "Trends in the Development of Contemporary Bashkir Poetry", Ufa, "Bulletin of the Academy of Sciences of RB", 2002, Vol. 7, No. 4.
- "The Year of Man". Ufa, "Kitap", 2003. 202 pages (in Russian).
- "Winged Babich", "Belskie Prostory", 2005 (in Russian).
- "Anthology of Poetry of Bashkortostan: Voices of the Centuries". Ufa, "Kitap", 2007. 465 pages (in Russian).
- "The Genealogy of Spiritual Unity", "Economics and Management: A Scientific-Practical Journal", "Belskie Prostory", 2007 (in Russian).
- "Rami. A Book about the Poet". Ufa, "Gilem", 2007. 487 pages (in Bashkir).
- "Assistance for Teachers" / Compiled by F.S. Akhmetova-Fazylova. Chief Editor M.Kh. Nadergulov. Ufa, 2007. 64 pages (in Bashkir).
- "Rami. A Book about the Poet". Ufa, "Gilem", 2008. 606 pages (in Russian).
- "The Fate of the Land, the Breath of Time". Ufa, "Kitap", 2009. 751 pages (in Russian and Bashkir).
- "Karim M., Garipov R., Bikbaev R. Study Edition" / Compiled by I.A. Sharapov. Ufa, "Kitap", 2009. 192 pages (in Bashkir).
- "The Path of Affirming Good (Notes of a Deputy)". Moscow, 2013. 40 pages (in Russian).
- "Eurasian Ideas and Bashkir Literature", Ufa, "Vatandash", 2013 (in Russian).
- "Dastan about Bashkortostan". Ufa, "Gilem", 2013. 624 pages (in Russian).
- "Omar Khayyam’s Rubaiyat in Rami Garipov’s Bashkir Translation", "Problems of Oriental Studies", 2013 (in Russian).
- "The Creative Path of Shaikhzada Babich in the Memory of His People", "Problems of Oriental Studies", 2014 (in Russian).
- "The Rider Azamat (The Reverence of Horses as Sacred Animals in Bashkir Folklore)", "Problems of Oriental Studies", 2016 (in Bashkir).
- "Shaikhzada Babich: Life and Work" (Series: Outstanding Personalities of Bashkortostan). Ufa, "Kitap", 2020. 224 pages (in Russian).
- "Rami: A Book about the Poet" (Series: Outstanding Personalities of Bashkortostan). Ufa, "Kitap", 2022. 680 pages (in Russian, translated from Bashkir by G.Ya. Khammatova).

=== Literature on Ravil Bikbaev ===
- "Literary Criticism and Literary Studies" // "History of Bashkir Soviet Literature". — Moscow: Nauka, 1977. — pp. 469–485.
- Smirnov V. "Alone with Himself and the Universe" // "Ural". 1979. No. 12. — pp. 176–178.
- Akhmadiev V. "Generational Connection". — Ufa: Bashkir Book Publishing House, 1985. — pp. 193–215.
- Nazarov Kh. "Sensitive and Weighty Creativity" // "Sovet Bashkortostany". 1981. January 31.
- Gali M. "Pulse of Mountain Springs" // "Vechernyaya Ufa", 1981. July 1.
- Khusainov G. "The Sense of Citizenship" // Khusainov G. "Poets". — Ufa: Bashkir Book Publishing House, 1981. — pp. 209–220.
- Kulsharipov M., Yuldashbaev A. "The Word as a Drawn Bowstring" // "Kyzyl Tan". 1982, September 10.
- Khusainov G. "Bashkir Soviet Poetry. 1917–1980". — Moscow: "Nauka", 1983 — pp. 289–292.
- Shafikov G. "Biography of the Heart: Sketches for a Portrait of Ravil Bikbaev" // "Literaturnaya Gazeta". 1983. August 17.
- Khuzangai A. "One Hundred Thousand Words"… Or the Dialectics of Renewal // "Druzhba Narodov". 1984. No. 11. — pp. 236–266.
- Nadergulov M. "A Collection of Poetic Gems" // "Sovet Bashkortostany". 1985. August 16.
- Ramazanov G. "On the Galloping Horse—Time" // "Literaturnaya Rossiya". 1986. January 24.
- Valieva V. "The Unfinished Eternity" // "Literaturnoe Obozrenie". 1988. No. 2. — pp. 54–56.
- Mustai Karim. "He is Both the Field and the Plowman: Sketches for a Portrait of Ravil Bikbaev" // "Literaturnaya Rossiya". 1988. December 30.
- Khusainov G. "The Poet’s Civic Position" // "Sovetskaya Bashkiriya". 1988. December 11.
- Daminov D. "In the Element of Four Beginnings" // "Leninets". 1988. December 10.
- Sultangareev R. "The Dignity of the Poet" // "Kyzyl Tan". 1989. March 3.
- Aralbaev K. "Multifaceted Creativity" // "Sovet Bashkortostany". 1989. March 7.
- Saitbattalov G. "Ravil Bikbaev—Master of Words" // "Sovet Bashkortostany". 1989. March 7.
- Kinyabulatov I. "People’s Poet—the Conscience of the Nation" // "Bashkortostan Kyz", 1994. No. 2. — pp. 8–9.
- Khabirov A. "The Poet’s Heart is Torn" // "Agidel", 1994. No. 7. — pp. 156–164.
- Shakurov R. "Criticism and Literary Studies" // "Renewal". — Ufa: "Kitap", 1994. — pp. 246–248.
- "History of Bashkir Literature in Six Volumes". Volume 5. Ufa, 1995.
- Khusainov G. "Poets. Ravil Bikbaev. Life and Work". Monograph. Ufa: "Kitap", 2008. 256 pages (in Bashkir).
- Sagadiev V. "Trends in the Development of Contemporary Bashkir Poetry" // "Vestnik of Bashkir University", 2008.
- Akhmadiev R. "The Historical Theme and Its Representation in the Plays "Kakhym-Tureya" by B. Bikbai and "Idukai and Muradym" by M. Burangulov". Ufa, 2012.
- "The Poet’s Word is the Poet’s Conscience". Methodological Recommendations. Ufa, 2013.
- Timerbaeva R. "Poetics and Problematics of R. Bikbaev’s Poem "I Thirst—Give Me Water!"", 2015.
- Dautova R. "The Genre Nature of R.T. Bikbaev’s "Letter to My People"", Ufa, 2016.
- Dautova R. "The Ideological and Thematic Features of Ravil Bikbaev’s Song Lyrics". Tambov, 2018.
- Aralbaev K. "The Poet’s Multifaceted Creativity (on the 80th anniversary of R.T. Bikbaev)". Ufa, 2018.
- Sanyarov F. "Ravil Bikbaev’s Hadiths as a Reflection of the Bashkir Religious Worldview" // "Vatandash", 2018 (in Russian).
- Dautova R. "Hitaps in the System of Manifesto-Publicist Lyric Genres of R.T. Bikbaev". Ufa, 2019.
- Baybulatova S. "The Ecological Theme in Ravil Bikbaev’s Poetry" // "Problems of Oriental Studies", 2020. No. 2020/3 (89).
- Basyrova Z. "Poet, Creator, and Citizen" // "Vechernyaya Ufa", 2020. No. 84 (13463).
- Baybulatova S. "Moral and Ethical Issues in R. Bikbaev’s Poem "Letter to My People"" // "Problems of Oriental Studies", 2021. No. 2021/3 (93).
- Yunusova F. "Travel Notes in Bashkir Literature (18th–End of the 20th Century)" // "Vestnik of the Academy of Sciences of the Republic of Bashkortostan", 2022. Vol. 44, Issue 3.

=== Titles and honors ===
- People's Poet of the Republic of Bashkortostan (1993)
- Doctor of Philological Sciences (1996)
- Honored Scientist of the Republic of Bashkortostan (1992)
- Honored Cultural Worker of the Chuvash Republic
- Honorary Citizen of Ufa (1999)
- Corresponding Member of the Academy of Sciences of the Republic of Bashkortostan (2009)

=== Awards ===
- Order of Honor (2009) – for contributions to the development of national culture and art, and for many years of fruitful work.
- Order of Friendship (2000) – for services to the state, many years of productive work in culture and the arts, and significant contributions to strengthening friendship and cooperation between peoples.
- Order "For Merit to the Republic of Bashkortostan" (2009).
- Order of Friendship of Peoples (Bashkortostan) (2000).
- Order of Salavat Yulaev (2000).
- State Prize of the Republic of Bashkortostan named after Salavat Yulaev (1989).
- Republican Prize named after Gabit Salyam (1970).
- Rami Garipov Prize (1994).
- Zainab Biisheva Prize (2003).

=== Commemoration ===
- Decree of the Head of the Republic of Bashkortostan, Radiy Khabirov, dated October 1, 2019, No. UG-322, "On the Commemoration of People’s Poet of Bashkortostan, Ravil Bikbaev.”
- On July 13, 2019, a memorial plaque dedicated to Ravil Bikbaev was unveiled in his native village of Gabdrafikovo, Perevolotsky District, Orenburg Oblast.
- In April 2019, an alley named after People's Poet of Bashkortostan, Ravil Bikbaev, was opened in Ufa, stretching from Sagit Aghish Street to Salavat Yulaev Avenue. As part of the "Green Bashkiria" initiative, large birch and pine trees were planted along the alley.
- Bashkir Gymnasium No. 102 in Ufa was named after Ravil Bikbaev. The decision was formalized by the Decree of the Government of the Republic of Bashkortostan, dated December 18, 2019, No. 753, "On Naming the Municipal Budgetary Educational Institution ‘Bashkir Gymnasium No. 102’ of the City of Ufa after Ravil Tukhatovich Bikbaev.”
- On February 26, 2020, the Government of the Republic of Bashkortostan established the Ravil Bikbaev Scholarships. These annual scholarships are awarded to students of higher education institutions in Bashkortostan for contributions to the study, development, and promotion of native languages and literature in the region.
- From November 9 to December 10, 2020, the "Bikbaev Readings" Interregional Scientific and Practical Conference was held, dedicated to the memory of Ravil Bikbaev and the Bashkir Language Day.
- In December 2020, the Ministries of Education of the Republic of Bashkortostan and Orenburg Oblast organized Ravil Bikbaev Days in Orenburg, aimed at promoting the Bashkir language across Russian regions.
- On December 23, 2020, the Ufa City Council assigned the name Ravil Bikbaev Street to a new street in Kirovsky District, Ufa.
- On December 30, 2020, a memorial plaque with a bas-relief of Ravil Bikbaev was unveiled on the building on Mendeleev Street in Ufa, where he lived from 1994 to 2019.
- Ravil Bikbaev Street was named in the village of Uchaly, Uchaly District, Republic of Bashkortostan.
- In December 2021, the Ministry of Education and Science of the Republic of Bashkortostan organized Ravil Bikbaev Days in Orenburg Oblast.
- On March 2, 2022, the Ufa City Council named a new 2,700 square meter park in Kirovsky District, Ufa, Ravil Bikbaev Park.
- On April 23, 2022, the third anniversary of Ravil Bikbaev's death, a grand opening ceremony of Ravil Bikbaev Park was held in Ufa, attended by the Head of Bashkortostan, Radiy Khabirov, and the mayor of Ufa, Ratmir Mavliev.
- On May 15, 2023, the National Archive of the Republic of Bashkortostan held a ceremony to launch a multimedia archive related to the life, public, scholarly, and creative work of Ravil Bikbaev. The "Ravil Bikbaev" website was also unveiled and is available online at.
- On September 19, 2024, a memorial plaque honoring Ravil Bikbaev was unveiled at the Akbulak Pedagogical College in Akbulak, Orenburg Oblast, where he studied from 1953 to 1956. On the same day, a roundtable discussion titled "The Pride of the Nation – Ravil Bikbaev" was held at the H. Yamash Library in Orenburg, celebrating the life and work of the People's Poet of Bashkortostan.

== Materials ==
Digitized works of Bikbaev in the National Library named after Akhmet-Zaki Validi of the Republic of Bashkortostan

- in Bashkir
- in Russian

Films and video materials

- Letter to My People. In Memory of People's Poet Ravil Bikbaev on YouTube
- Honorary Citizen of Ufa – Ravil Bikbaev on YouTube
- GTRK "Bashkortostan" – Ravil Bikbaev on YouTube
- Anniversary Evening of People's Poet of RB Ravil Bikbaev at Bashkir State Philharmonic on YouTube
- A Great Loss: One of the Authors of the Republic's Anthem, Ravil Bikbaev, Passed Away in Ufa on YouTube
- Unveiling of a Memorial Plaque for People's Poet of Bashkortostan Ravil Tukhatovich Bikbaev in the Village of Gabdrafikovo on YouTube
- Evening in Memory of Ravil Bikbaev at Bashkir Gymnasium No. 102 named after R.T. Bikbaev on YouTube
- I Interregional Scientific and Practical Conference "Bikbaev Readings" on YouTube
