= State Anthem of Bashkortostan =

Başqortostan Respublikahınıñ Däwlät gimnı
English: State Anthem of the Republic of Bashkortostan
- Башҡортостан Республикаһының Дәүләт гимны
- Coat of arms of Bashkortostan
- Regional anthem of Bashkortostan, Russia
- Lyrics: Ravil Bikbaev, Rashid Shakur (Bashkir version); Farit Idrisov, Svetlana Churayeva (Russian version)
- Music: Farid Idrisov, 11 October 1990
- Adopted: 12 October 1993; 18 September 2008 (officially)

Audio sample
- Official Bashkir orchestral and choral vocal recording: file; help

Official Russian orchestral and choral vocal recording

Official instrumental recording

The State Anthem of the Republic of Bashkortostan (Note: Bashkir: Башҡортостан Республикаһының Дәүләт гимны, romanized: Başqortostan Respublikahınıñ Däwlät gimnı, pronounced [bɒʂˌqʊ̞rtʊ̞sˈtɑn rɪ̞sˈpublʲikɑhɯ̞ˌnɯ̞ŋ dæwˈlæt gʲimˈnɯ̞]) was adopted on 12 October 1993, and officially ratified by the Constitution of the Republic of Bashkortostan on 18 September 2008. According to Article 112 of the Constitution, the anthem serves as one of the federal subject's official state symbols, along with its flag and coat of arms.

The anthem has official lyrics in two of the republic's official languages: Bashkir and Russian. The Bashkir lyrics were written by Bashkir authors Ravil Bikbaev and Rashid Shakurov. The Russian lyrics were penned by Svetlana Churayeva with the help of Bashkir musician Farid Idrisov, who also helped with the development of the music.

== History ==
=== Previous anthems ===
The Internationale

The Internationale (Bashkir and Russian: Интернационал) was the anthem of the Russian SFSR and the Soviet Union from 1918 to 1944. This was also translated into the Bashkir language. Its translator into Bashkir language is unknown.

State Anthem of the Soviet Union

State Anthem of the Soviet Union (Bashkir: Совет Социалистик Республикалар Союзының дәүләт гимны; Russian: Государственный гимн Союза Советских Социалистических Республик) was the national anthem of the Soviet Union from 1944 to 1991 and the regional anthem of the Russian SFSR from 1944 to 1990.

Usage in the Bashkir ASSR

This anthem was translated into the Bashkir language by Abdulkhak Igebaev, Ghilemdar Ramazanov and Safuan Alibay.

=== Current anthem ===
The anthem was first approved by the Law of the Republic of Bashkortostan "On the State Anthem of the Republic of Bashkortostan" on 12 October 1993. The music was originally composed by Farid Idrisov on 11 October 1990 for his song "Republic". The melody is partly derived from a Bashkir folk song titled "Uralım" ('My Ural'). The Ural Mountains, an important and sacred landmark of the Bashkir people, are mentioned in the third line of the first verse of the lyrics.

On 6 July 1999, the Law "On State Symbols of the Republic of Bashkortostan" was approved, along with the order of execution and use of the national anthem.

== Performance ==
The anthem is performed during opening and closing ceremonies and in meetings dedicated to state holidays. It is performed while taking the oath upon taking office as Head of Bashkortostan, during the opening and closing meetings of the State Assembly — Qurultay of the Republic of Bashkortostan, during the official lifting ceremony of the national flag, and during visits to the republic by foreign heads of state. The music of the composition is to be played in the E-flat major key.

== Lyrics ==
There are both separate Bashkir and Russian vocal renditions. It is played in orchestral choir renditions, videotapes, television, and radio broadcasts.

=== Bashkir version ===
Cyrillic script

Башҡортостан, һин һөйөклө ғәзиз ер,
Халҡыбыҙҙың изге Ватаны.
Сал Уралдан ҡалҡа бар тарафҡа
Тыуған илдең тыныс ал таңы.

Ҡушымта:
Дан һиңә, Башҡортостан!
Илен һөйгән азат халҡыңа дан!
Рәсәй менән бөйөк берҙәмлектә
Сәскә ат, Башҡортостан!

Башҡортостан, һин хөрмәтле данлы ил,
Еңеү яулап алға бараһың.
Киләсәккә яҡты нур-моң сәсә
Һинең ғорур рухлы байрағың.

Ҡушымтаһы

Республикам, йондоҙ булып балҡы һин,
Күкрәп йәшә, гүзәл илебеҙ.
Тыуған ерҙә һүнмәҫ усағыбыҙ,
Тыуған телдә тынмаҫ йырыбыҙ.

Ҡушымтаһы

Latin script

Başqortostan, hin höyöklö ğäziz yer,
Xalqıbıźźıñ izge Watanı.
Sal Uraldan qalqa bar tarafqa
Tıwğan ildeñ tınıs al tañı.

Quşımta:
Dan hiñä, Başqortostan!
İlen höygän azat xalqıña dan!
Räsäy menän böyök berźämlektä
Säskä at, Başqortostan!

Başqortostan, hin xörmätle danlı il,
Yeñew yawlap alğa barahıñ.
Kiläsäkkä yaqtı nur-moñ säsä
Hineñ ğorur ruxlı bayrağıñ.

Quşımtahı

Respublikam, yondoź bulıp balqı hin,
Kükräp yäşä, güzäl ilebeź.
Tıwğan yerźä hünmäś usağıbıź,
Tıwğan teldä tınmaś yırıbıź.

Quşımtahı

IPA transcription (Note: See Help:IPA, Bashkir language § Orthography and Bashkir language § Phonology.)

[bɑʂ.qʊ̞r.tʊ̞s.ˈtɑn | hʲe̝n hʏ̞.jʏ̞k.ˈlʏ̞ ʁæ.ˈzʲiz jɪ̞r |]
[χɑɫ.qɯ̞.βɯ̞ð.ˈðɯ̞ŋ e̝z.ˈɡɪ̞ wɑ.tɑ.ˈnɯ̞ ‖]
[sɑɫ o̝.rɑɫ.ˈdɑn qɑɫ.ˈqɑ bɑr tɑ.rɑf.ˈqɑ |]
[tʊw.ˈʁɑn e̝l.ˈdɪ̞ŋ tɯ̞.ˈnɯ̞s ɑɫ tɑ.ˈŋɯ̞ ‖]

[qo̝.ʂɯ̞m.ˈtɑ]
[dɑn | hʲe̝ŋ.ˈæ bɑʂ.qʊ̞r.tʊ̞s.ˈtɑn ‖]
[e̝.ˈlɪ̞n hʏ̞j.ˈgæn ɑ.ˈzɑt χɑɫ.qɯ̞ŋ.ˈɑ dɑn ‖]
[ræ.ˈsæj mɪ̞.ˈnæn bʏ̞.ˈjʏ̞k bɪ̞r.ðæm.lɪ̞k.ˈtæ |]
[sæs.ˈkæ ɑt | bɑʂ.qʊ̞r.tʊ̞s.ˈtɑn ‖]

[bɑʂ.qʊ̞r.tʊ̞s.ˈtɑn | hʲe̝n χʏ̞r.mæt.ˈlɪ̞ dɑn.ˈɫɯ̞ e̝l |]
[jɪ̞.ˈŋɪ̞w jɑw.ˈɫɑp ɑɫ.ˈʁɑ bɑ.rɑ.ˈhɯ̞ŋ ‖]
[kʲe̝.læ.sæk̚.ˈkæ jɑq.ˈtɯ̞ nur.ˈmʊ̞ɴ sæ.ˈsæ |]
[hʲe̝.ˈnɪ̞ŋ ʁʊ̞.ˈrur ruχ.ˈɫɯ̞ bɑj.rɑ.ˈʁɯ̞ŋ ‖]

[qo̝.ʂɯ̞m.tɑ.ˈhɯ̞]

[rʲe̝s.ˈpub.lʲi.käm | jʊ̞n.ˈdʊ̞ð bo̝.ˈɫɯ̞p bɑɫ.ˈqɯ̞ hʲe̝n |]
[kɵk.ˈræp jæ.ˈʃæ | ɡɵ.ˈzæl e̝.lɪ̞.ˈβɪ̞ð ‖]
[tʊw.ˈʁɑn jɪ̞r.ˈðæ hɵn.ˈmæθ o̝.sɑ.ʁɯ̞.ˈβɯ̞ð |]
[tʊw.ˈʁɑn tɪ̞l.ˈdæ tɯ̞n.ˈmɑθ jɯ̞.rɯ̞.ˈβɯ̞ð ‖]

[qo̝.ʂɯ̞m.tɑ.ˈhɯ̞]

=== Russian version ===
Cyrillic script

Башкортостан, Отчизна дорогая,
Ты для нас священная земля.
С Урала солнце всходит, озаряя
Наши горы, реки и поля.

Припев:
Славься, наш Башкортостан!
Судьбой народу ты для счастья дан!
С Россией мы едины – и всегда
Процветай, Башкортостан!

Башкортостан – ты наша честь и слава.
Доброй волей, дружбой ты силён.
И стяг твой реет гордо, величаво –
Он свободой, братством окрылён.

Припев

Республика, сияй звездой прекрасной,
Ты ликуй в свершеньях и трудах!
Родной очаг пусть никогда не гаснет,
Пусть ведут нас песни сквозь года.

Припев

Latin script

Bashkortostan, Otchizna dorogaya,
Ty dlya nas svyashchennaya zemlya.
S Urala solnce vskhodit, ozaryaya
Nashi gory, reki i polya.

Pripev:
Slavsya, nash Bashkortostan!
Sudboy narodu ty dlya schastia dan!
S Rossiyey my yediny – i vsegda
Procvetay, Bashkortostan!

Bashkortostan – ty nasha chest i slava.
Dobroy voley, druzhboy ty silyon.
I styag tvoy reyet gordo, velichavo –
On svobodoy, bratstvom okrylyon.

Pripev

Respublika, siyay zvezdoy prekrasnoy,
Ty likuy v sversheniakh i trudakh!
Rodnoy ochag pust nikogda ne gasnet,
Pust vedut nas pesni skvoz goda.

Pripev

IPA transcription (as sung) (Note: See File:Anthem of Bashkortostan (Russian version).ogg, Help:IPA/Russian and Russian phonology.)

[bɐʂ.kɐr.tɐ.ˈstan | ɐt.ˈt͡ɕiz.nɐ dɐ.rɐ.ˈɡa.ja |]
[tɨ dlʲa nas svʲɛɕ.ˈɕɛn.na.ja zʲɪm.ˈlʲa ‖]
[s‿ʊ.ˈra.ɫɐ ˈson.t͡sɪ ˈfsxo.dʲɪt | ɐ.zɐ.ˈrʲa.ja]
[ˈna.ʂɨ ˈgo.rɨ | ˈrʲɛ.kʲɪ i pɐ.ˈlʲa ‖]

[prʲɪ.ˈpʲɛf]
[ˈslafʲ.sʲɐ | naʐ‿bɐʂ.kɐr.tɐ.ˈstan ǁ]
[sʊdʲ.ˈboj nɐ.ˈro.dʊ tɨ dlʲɐ ˈɕːæsʲ.tʲjɐ dan ǁ]
[s‿ra.ˈsʲi.jɪj mɨ jɛ.ˈdʲi.nɨ | i fsʲɛɡ.ˈda]
[pra.t͡svʲɪ.ˈtaj | bɐʂ.kɐr.tɐ.ˈstan ǁ]

[bɐʂ.kɐr.tɐ.ˈstan | tɨ ˈna.ʂɐ t͡ɕɛsʲtʲ i ˈsɫa.va |]
[ˈdob.raj ˈvo.lʲej | ˈdruʐ.bɐj tɨ sʲɪ.ˈlʲɵn ǁ]
[i sʲtʲak tvoj ˈrʲɛ.jɛd‿ˈgor.dɐ | vʲɛ.lʲɪ.ˈt͡ɕa.va |]
[on svɐ.ˈbo.daj | ˈbrat͡s.tvɐm ɐ.krɨ.ˈlʲɵn ǁ]

[prʲɪ.ˈpʲɛf]

[rʲɛs.ˈpub.lʲɪ.ka | sʲi.ˈjaj zvʲɪz.ˈdoj prʲɪ.ˈkras.naj |]
[tɨ lʲɪ.ˈkuj f‿svʲɪr.ˈʂɛnʲ.jɐx i trʊ.ˈdax ǁ]
[rɐd.ˈnoj ɐ.ˈt͡ɕak pusʲtʲ nʲɪ.kɐɡ.ˈda nʲɛ ˈgasʲ.nʲɛt |]
[pusʲtʲ vʲɛ.ˈdut nas ˈpʲɛsʲ.nʲɪ skvozʲ‿gɐ.ˈda ǁ]

[prʲɪ.ˈpʲɛf]

=== English version ===
Bashkortostan, land beloved and precious,
The sacred homeland dear to all of us.
The sun rises from the olden Urals,
Shining over our rivers and fields.

Chorus:
Hail to our Bashkortostan!
May your proud folk happy and free remain.
With Russia we are forever united,
Blossom, O Bashkortostan!

Bashkortostan, land of honour and glory,
You move onward strong and mightily.
Light is shining into our destiny,
Your proud flag is waving most highly.

Chorus

My republic, glow like a beautiful star,
You succeed through exploits and labour.
Our native hearth shall never fade away,
Nor shall our tunes ever be washed away.

Chorus

Translation:
