= Flag of Bashkortostan =

Republic of Bashkortostan
- Proportion: 1:2 → 2:3
- Adopted: 25 February 1992; 12 February 2003 (proportion changed)
- Design: A horizontal tricolor of teal blue, white and green with a yellow circle bearing the kurai flower.
- Designed by: O. Y. Asabina and U. T. Masalimov
- Flag of the Bashkir ASSR
- Proportion: 1:2
- Adopted: 1954
- Design: The flag of the Bashkir ASSR is a variant of the flag of the Russian SFSR with the "Башкирская АССР" and "Башҡорт АССР-ы" inscription below the hammer and sickle.
- Designed by: Valentin Petrovich Viktorov
- Flag of Bashkurdistan
- Proportion: 1:2
- Adopted: 20 August 1918
- Design: A horizontal tricolor of blue, green and white.
- Designed by: Zeki Velidi Togan

The flag of Bashkortostan (Note: Bashkir: Башҡортостан Республикаһының Дәүләт Байрағы, Russian: Государственный Флаг Республики Башкортостан) is one of the official state symbols of the Republic of Bashkortostan, a federal subject and republic of Russia, alongside the coat of arms and anthem. The flag has three horizontal stripes. From top to bottom, the stripes are teal blue, white, and green. The flag has been used officially as the flag of the Republic of Bashkortostan since 25 February 1992. The white stripe of the flag is charged with a kurai flower in the center.

The first national entity that represents the Bashkir people was the state of Bashkurdistan. The state uses a flag similar to the current flag of Bashkortostan. The flag was a tricolor consisted of blue, green and white. After the assimilation of Bashkurdistan to the Soviet Union in 1919, Bashkurdistan was absorbed to the USSR as an autonomous republic, the Bashkir ASSR. The Bashkir ASSR used a flag similar to all of the autonomous republics: a red flag with the inscription of the nation's name. The flag of Bashkir ASSR is also identical with the flag of the Russian SFSR at the corresponding time.

== Symbolism ==
The Kurai flower represents friendship, and its seven petals represent the seven tribes who bring unity, and consolidation to Bashkortostan. The blue represents the integrity, and the excellence of the thoughts of the Bashkir people, and the white stands for their peacefulness, and their willingness to cooperate, and the green for freedom, and eternal life.

== History ==
=== As Bashkurdistan ===
The first national flag of Bashkortostan was designed by a Bashkir statesman, Akhmetzaki Akhmetshahovich Validov (1890–1970). The flag consisted of three horizontal stripes of equal size, which is blue, green and white. The flag was approved by the Order of the Government of Bashkurdistan No. 4547 on 20 August 1918. The order was published on June 19, 1918 in the Bashkort newspaper and on August 20, 1918 in the newspaper "Bashkortostan hokumetenen tele". This flag was also originally used as a common flag of the Bashkir army.

The blue color on the flag symbolized the union of the Bashkirs with the Turks, the green colour symbolizes Islam, and the white colour symbolizes the desire for peace, happiness and prosperity.

=== As the Bashkir ASSR ===
After the formation of the Bashkir ASSR, the first flag of the Bashkir ASSR was adopted in 1922. The flag was a red flag, with the abbreviation of the name of the republic inscribed in the flag. The flag was used until 11 October 1924, when the decree "On the change of the State flag of the Bashkir ASSR", changed the design of the flag of the Bashkir ASSR. The inscription in the flag was replaced with the hammer and sickle.

After the promulgation of the new constitution of the Bashkir ASSR, a new state flag of the Bashkir ASSR was approved on 23 July 1937 at the 10th All-Bashkir Congress of Soviets. The flag was the same with the flag of the Russian SFSR. The only difference was some additional inscriptions. The inscriptions underwent a minor change on 9 February 1938, after the transition of the writing system of the Bashkir language by the decree of the Presidium of the Central Executive Committee of the Bashkir ASSR.

A new state flag of the Bashkir ASSR was adopted on March 31, 1954, by the decree of the Presidium of the Supreme Soviet of the Bashkir ASSR "On the State Flag of the Bashkir Autonomous Soviet Socialist Republic". The details of the flag design was specified with the adoption of the "Provision on the State Flag of the Bashkir Autonomous Soviet Socialist Republic" on 16 January 1956 by the Supreme Soviet of the Bashkir ASSR. The new state flag was identical with the state flag of the Russian SFSR, but with additional inscriptions of the abbreviation of the Bashkir ASSR in Bashkir and Russian languages.

=== As the Republic of Bashkortostan ===
==== Background ====
After the adoption of the Declaration of State Sovereignty of the Bashkir SSR on October 11, 1990, the communist symbols of the republic ceased to reflect the current situations of Bashkortostan and the need to adopt new state symbols arose, including the new flag. Prior to the creation of the new flag, the leaders of the Bashkir nationalist movement decided to adopt the flag of Bashkurdistan as its official flag.

==== Competition ====
To address this need, by the Decree Number 211 of 26 November 1990, the Council of Ministers of the Bashkir SSR declared a countrywide competition for the best draft of state symbols of the republic which was to be submitted prior to 15 February 1991. Later, the Order of the Council of Ministers of the Bashkir SSR of December 30, 1990, approved the Regulations on the procedure for holding a competition, which extended the deadline for presenting sketches of the flag and coat of arms by March 1, 1991. The sketches were to be made in color on a thick paper with a minimum size of 30 × 20 cm. The sketches were to be attached with a note indicating the dimensions and a detailed explanation of the meaning of the symbols. The winners of the competition for the best design of state symbols were scheduled to be awarded four awards with 3,000 rubles each.

Several prominent Bashkir artists submitted their projects. About 40 draft flags were submitted to the competition commission under the chairmanship of M. A. Ayupov. The competition was won by the project submitted by the art editor of the Kitap publishing house, Ural Masalimov, and Olga Asabina, a student from the Ufa School of Arts. The kurai flower was designed by Nil Khabibullin in the 1960s as a television screensaver for the Day of Bashkir Culture in Leningrad.

The order of the stripes of the flag changed in 1991 after the Komi Republic adopted a similar flag to the flag of Bashkortostan. The green and white stripes was swapped.

=== Adoption as the state flag ===
On February 25, 1992, the Bashkir SSR was renamed as the Republic of Bashkortostan by the Supreme Council of the Bashkir SSR. The flag of the Republic of Bashkortostan was adopted on the same day.

== Timeline ==
Flag	Date	Use	Description
	1917–1919	Flag of Bashkiria	
	1925–1937	Flag of the Bashkir ASSR	
	1937–1938	Flag of the Bashkir ASSR	
	1938–1947	Flag of the Bashkir ASSR	
	1947–1954	Flag of the Bashkir ASSR	
	1954–1992	Flag of the Bashkir ASSR	
	1992–2003	Flag of Bashkortostan	Original version with 1:2 ratio

== Gallery ==
Flag	Date	Use	Description
	1993–Present	Flag of the Head of Bashkortostan	
