= Rami Garipov =

Bashkir poet

- Born: Rami Yagafarovich Garipov; 12 February 1932; Arkaulovo, Salavatsky District, Bashkir ASSR, Russian SFSR, Soviet Union
- Died: 20 February 1977 (aged 45); Ufa, Bashkir ASSR, Russian SFSR, Soviet Union
- Education: Maxim Gorky Literature Institute
- Occupations: Poet, novelist, playwright, librettist
- Writing career
- Notable awards: Salawat Yulayev Award; 1988, posthumous

Rami Yagafarovich Garipov (Bashkir: Рәми Йәғәфәр улы Ғарипов, romanized: Rämi Yäğäfär ulı Ğaripov, 12 February 1932 – 20 February 1977), was a national poet of Bashkortostan, writer and playwright.

== Biography ==
The national poet of Bashkortostan Rami Yagafarovich Garipov was born February 12, 1932, and in the village Arkaul Salavat district Bashkir ASSR (Bashkir Republic). He graduated from a seven-year school in his native village, then studied at Ufa secondary school No.9

Between 1950and 1955 Garipov was a student at the Maxim Gorky Literature Institute (Moscow). After the Institute he worked in the editorial offices of the newspaper Council of Bashkortostan, the magazine Agidel and the editor of fiction Bashkir book publishing house. In 1959-1964 Rami Garipov lived in his native land, worked as a secretary of the Komsomol (Youth) organization of the Yuryuzan collective farm and the Sargamysh state farm of the Salavat district, and the department head of the Salavat regional newspaper.

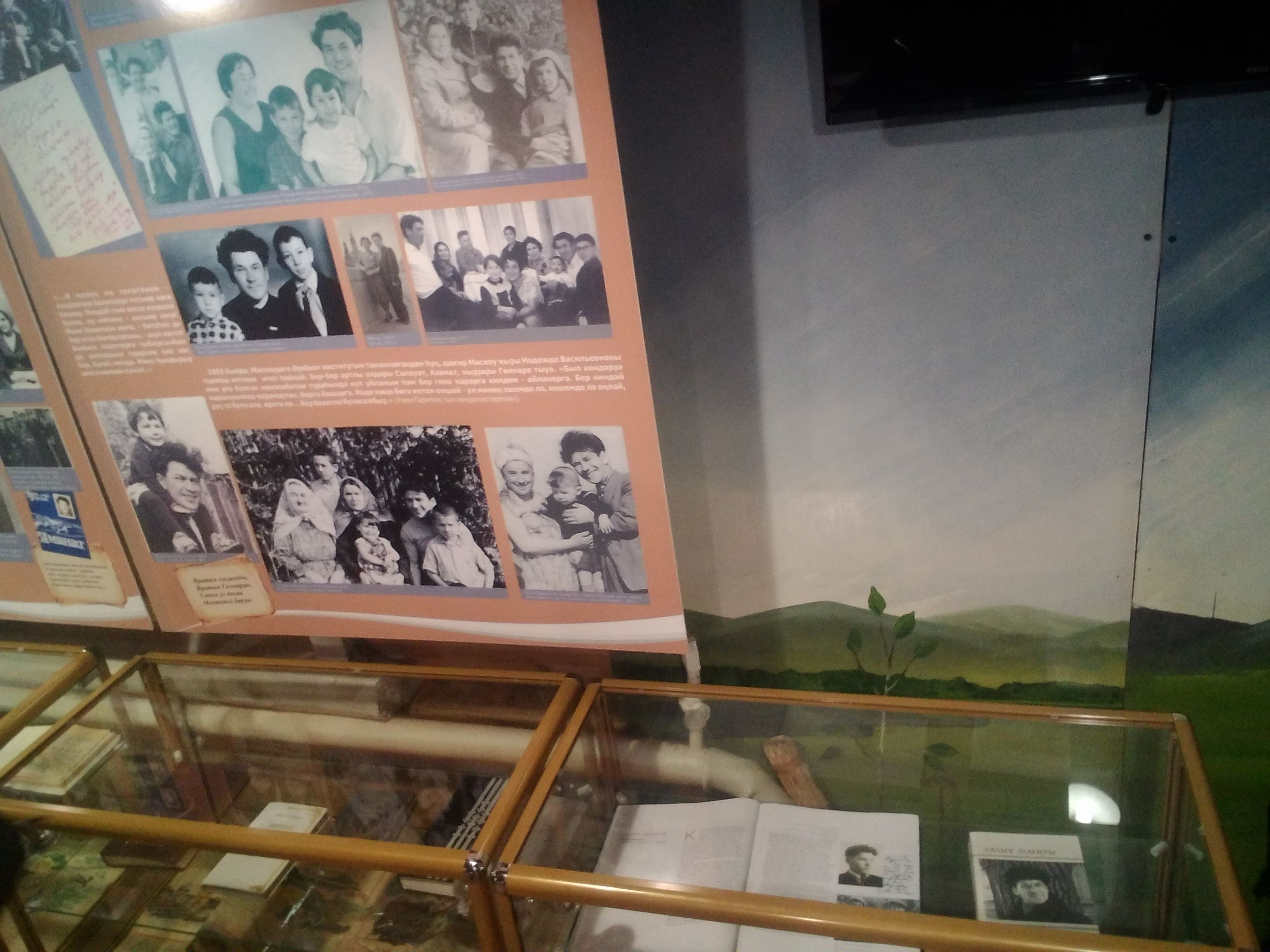
Rami Garipov museum

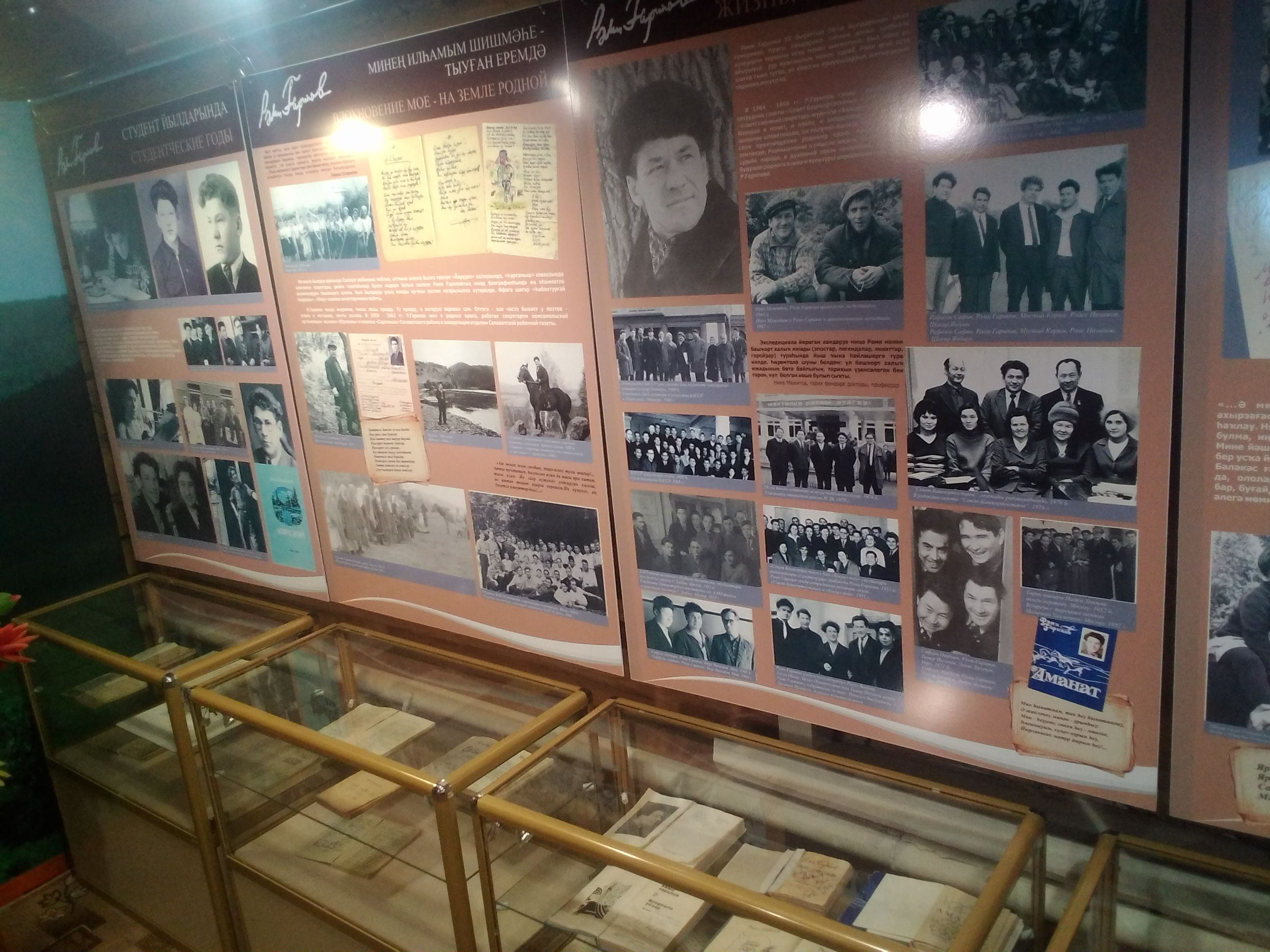
Rami Garipov museum

In 1964-1966 he was a literary employee of the newspaper "Council of Bashkortostan", and in 1968-1972 Executive Secretary of Bashkortostan Kyzy magazine. Rami Garipov began to be published in 1950. The first poem was published in the journal Әthәbi Bashkortostan ’in 1950. The first book of poems "Yuryuzan" (1954) was a thesis of a student of the Literary Institute. He dedicated the collections of poems “Stone Flower” (1958), “Song of the Lark” (1964) to his native land, nature, and his countrymen. In the subsequent collections “Flight” (1966), “The Treasured Word” (1969), “Rowan” (1974), one can feel an attraction to philosophical lyrics.

Reflections on the meaning of life, on the historical fate of the people, on the spiritual connection of generations, anxiety for the future of their native language and culture - defined the essence of the poetry of R. Garipov. He often turns to Bashkir poetry, especially the Kubair genres and classical folk songs. The great merit of R. Garipov in the revival and development of these genres.

R. Garipov is also known as a master of literary translation, from the poetry of Alexandr Pushkin, Mikhail Lermontov, Sergei Yesenin, Alexander Blok, Heinrich Heine, Rudaki, Rasul Gamzatov and others. He also translated the collections of short stories into the Bashkir language Ivan Franko “To the Light” (1959). The poet fruitfully worked on translations of the ruby Omar Khayyam. The result of his translation work was the book “My Anthology” (1991).

For the critical attitude to Soviet national politics, the talented poet R. Garipov was persecuted. Many poems remained unpublished during the life of the poet. Written in 1964, the poem "1937" was released only in 1987. Member of Union of Writers of the USSR since 1960 a, from where he was expelled for a poem about love of his native language.

Died of heart failure February 20, 1977. He was buried in Muslim Cemetery of Ufa. Rami Garipov was posthumously awarded the title People's poet of Bashkortostan (1992). Posthumously awarded the Republican Prize named after Salawat Yulayev (1988) with the wording "For the poetry works published in recent years".

His wife Nadezhda Vasilievna (Ukrainian) raised the poet’s children in the spirit of respect for the Bashkir people and the Bashkir language.

The most famous poem by Rami Garipov is “Tugan tel” (“Native language”).

The February blizzard

Don’t believe the February blizzard.

There’s no guile in it, it never harms…

Let it ragе without some rest and sleep,

The beautiful spring is in its arms.

Everybody will live on the Earth,

Except you and me. I am not sure

How I can leave this world, my darling…

What a pity - I will not endure…

( translated by R. Yumadilova)

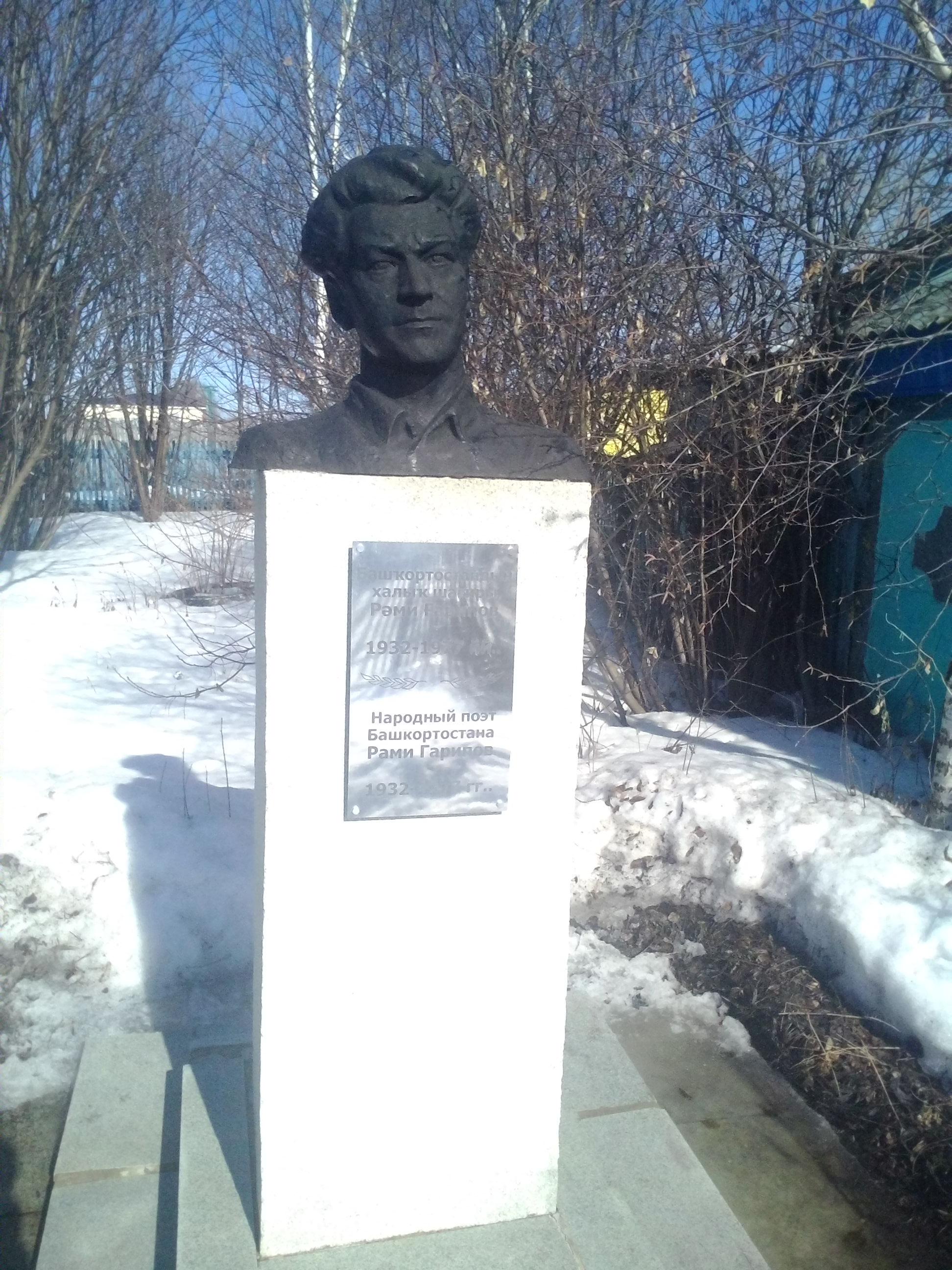
At the Rami Garipov Museum in Arkaul

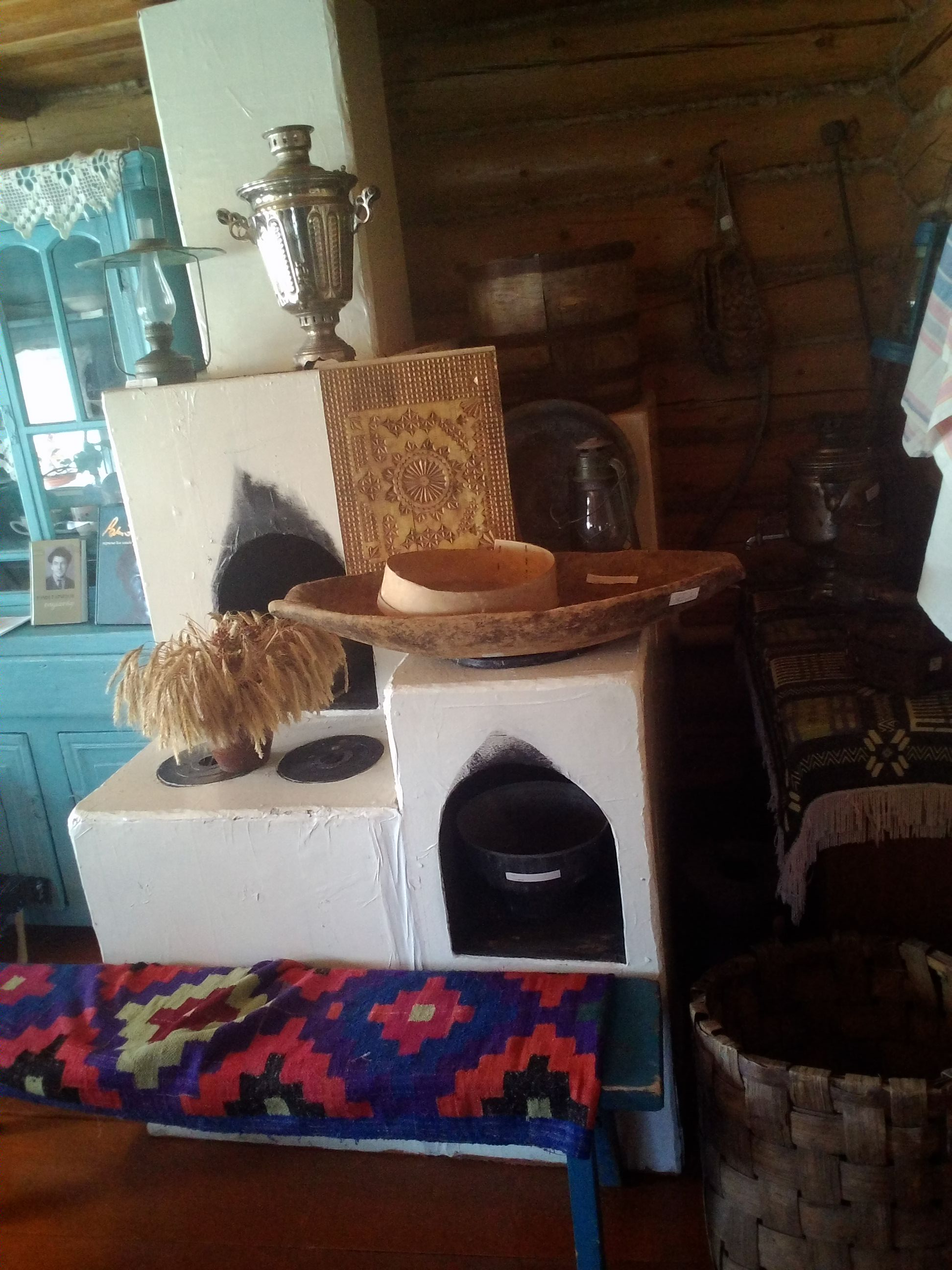
At the Rami Garipov Museum in Arkaul

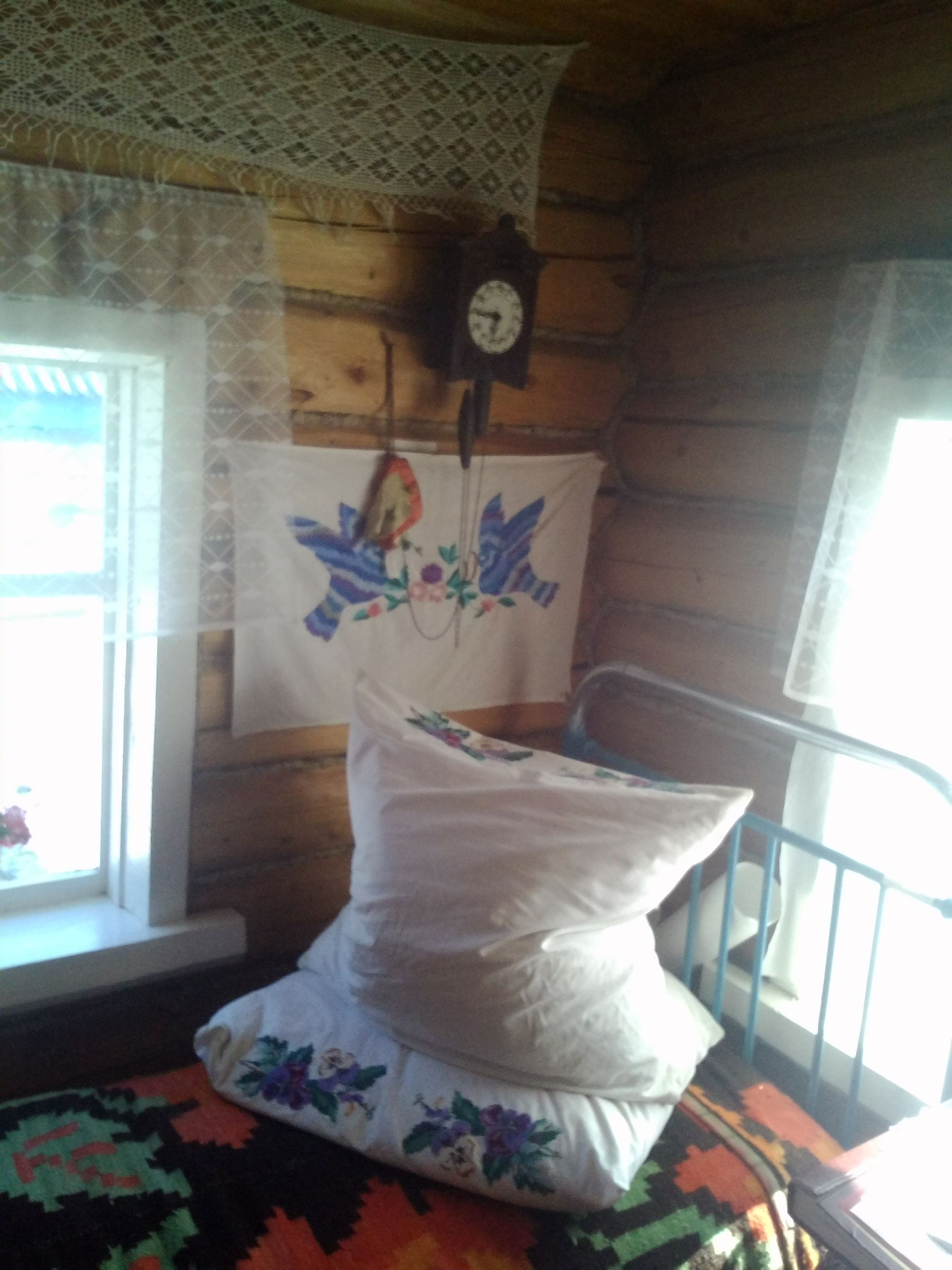
At the Rami Garipov Museum

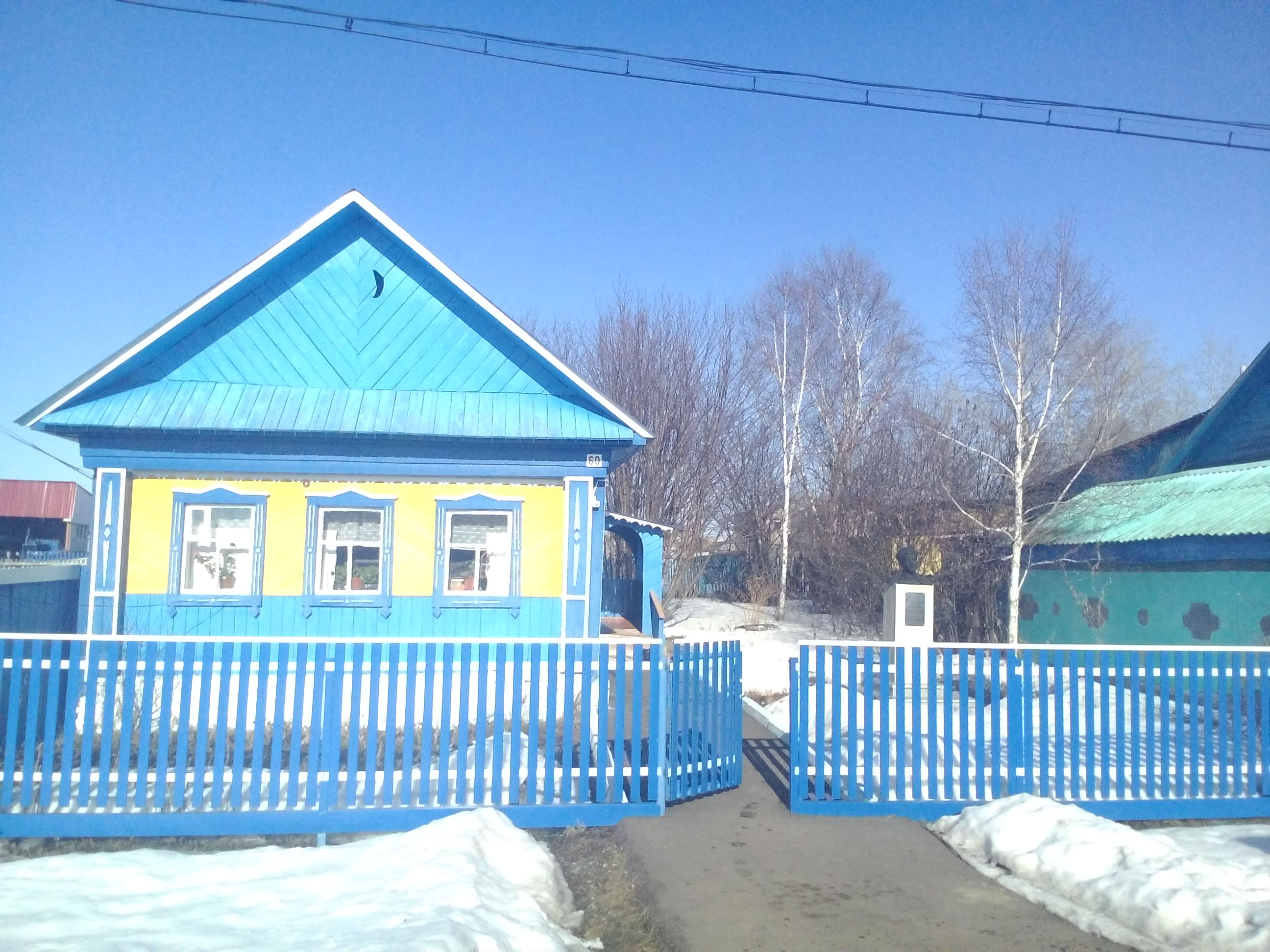
At the Rami Garipov Museum

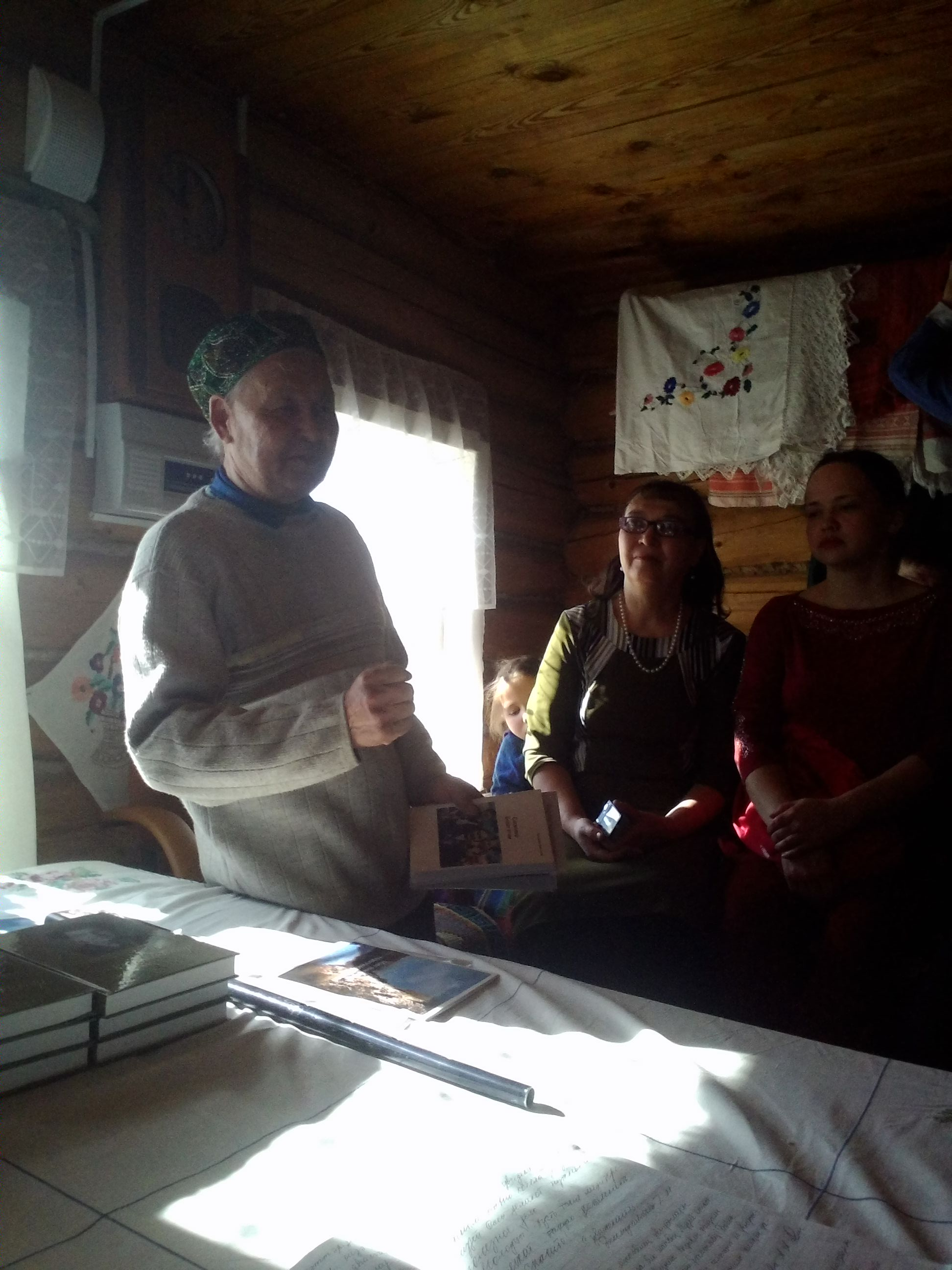
At the Rami Garipov Museum

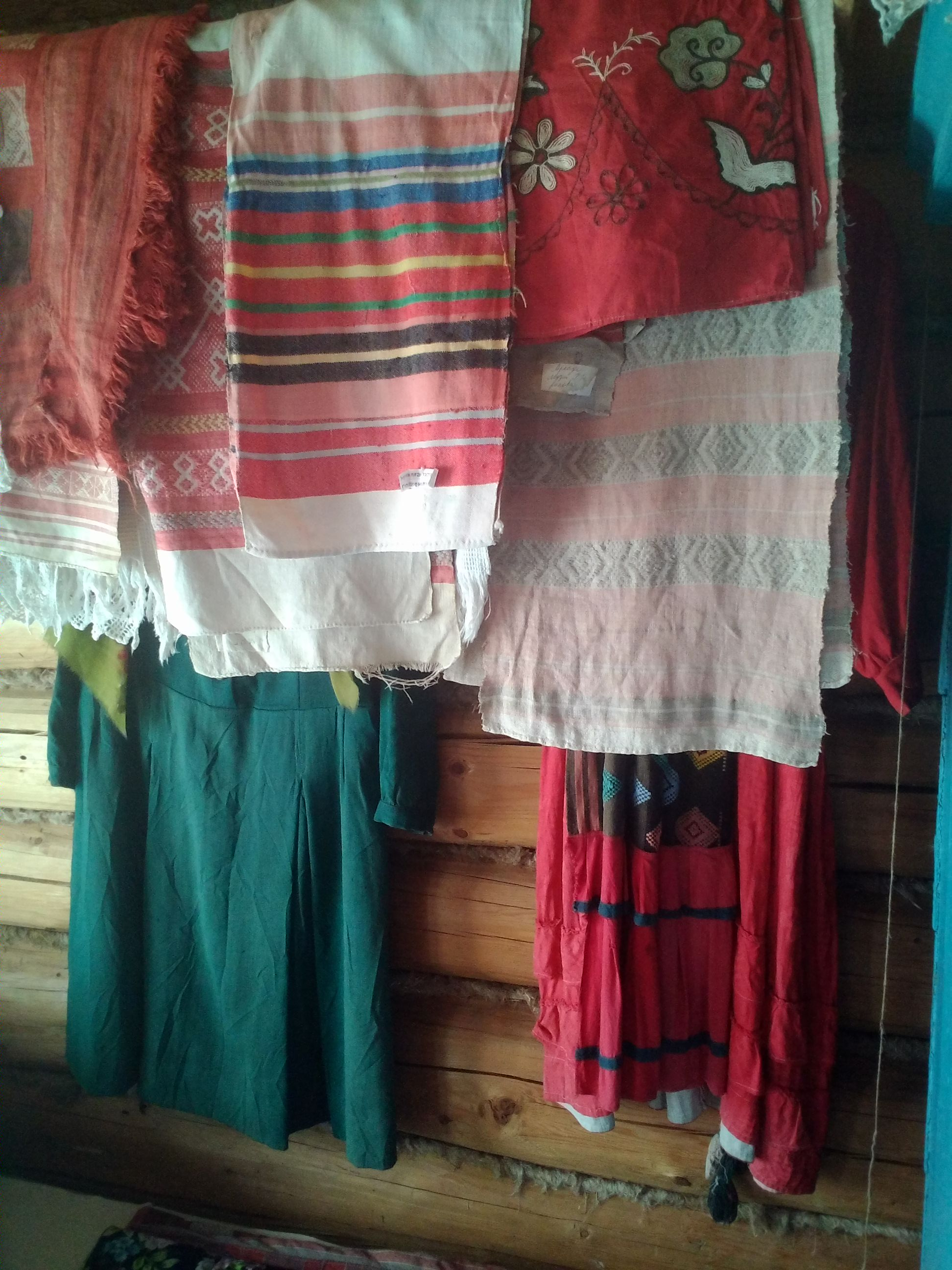
At the Rami Garipov Museum

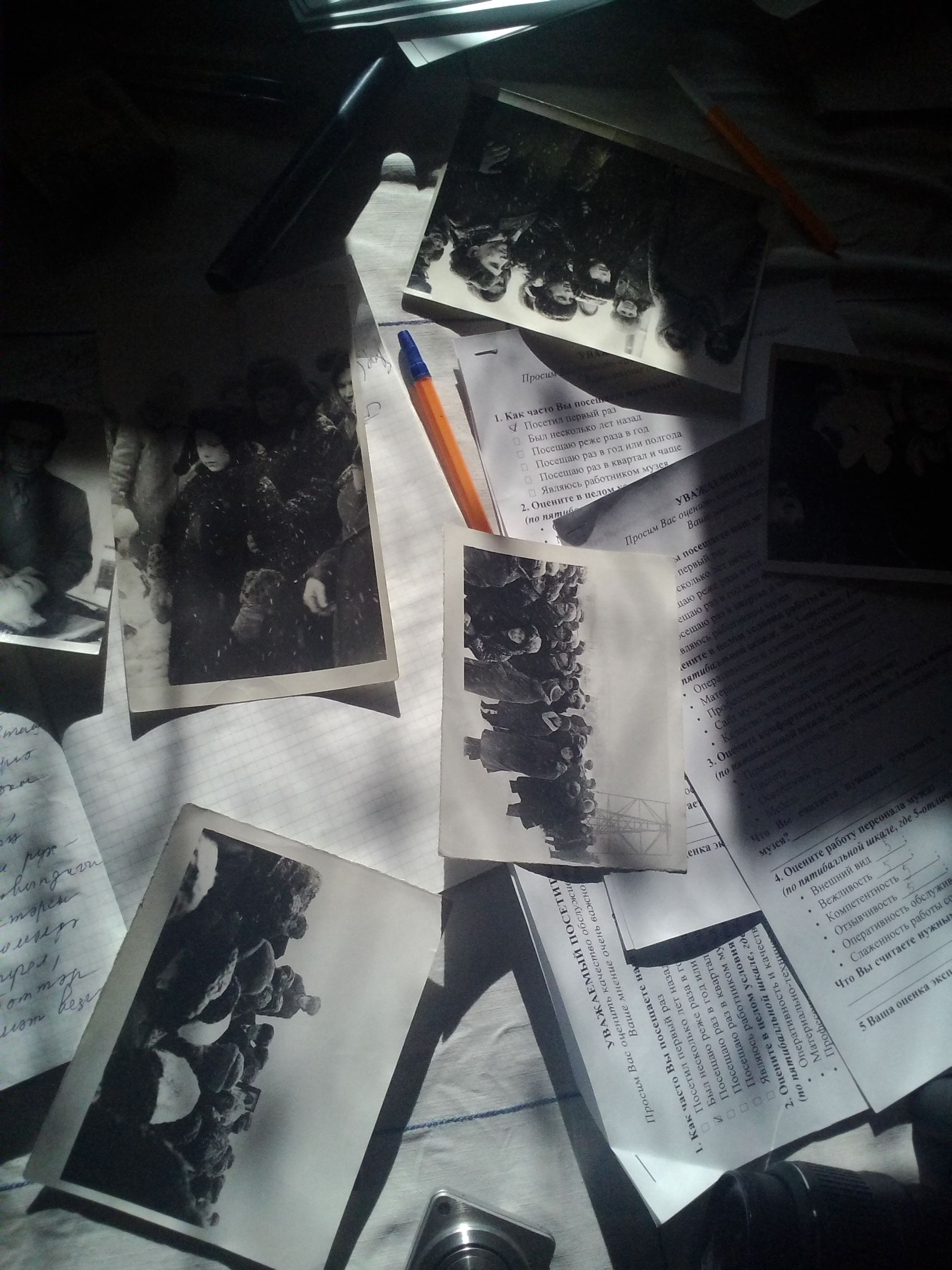
At the Rami Garipov Museum

== Bibliography ==
- Works. - In 3 vols. - Ufa, 1996-1998
- Yuryuzan. Poems. - Ufa, 1954
- Stone Flower. Lyrics. - Ufa, 1958,
- Lark songs. - Ufa, 1964
- Flight. Poems. - Ufa, 1966
- The coveted word. - Ufa, 1969
- Rowan. Poems. - Ufa, 1974
- Star thoughts. Poems. - Ufa, 1979
- Snowdrop song. - Ufa, 1981 * My anthology. Translations. - Ufa, 1990
- Alyrimkosh and Birmamkosh. Selected works. - Ufa, 1992
- Campion. Poems. - Ufa, 1969. (in Russian)
- Return. Poems and poem. / Foreword M. Karima. - Moscow, 1981.

== Memory ==
In the village Arkaulovo of the Salavat district, a house museum was opened, a bust of the poet was installed. A documentary about life and work was created.

The name of Rami Garipov is:

- Bashkir Republican Gymnasium No. 1;
- A street in the village Arkaulovo;
- In November 1990, a Rami Garipov Prize was established.
- In the city of Ufa there is a street of Rami Garipov.
- In the town of Meleuz there is Rami Garipov street
- In the village Kadyrovo Kugarchinsky district, the main street is named after the poet.

== Literature ==
- Karim M. Letter to Rami Garipov. - Ufa, 1960.
- Karim M. Face to the rising sun. - Ufa, 1960.
- Timergalina R. Rami Garipov. Writers of Bashkortostan. - Ufa, 1968.
- Gainullin M., Khusainov G. Writers of Soviet Bashkiria. - Ufa, 1988.
- Khusainov G . Words of the will. About Rami Garipov. The poets. - Ufa, 1981.
- History of Bashkir literature. In 6 volumes. - T. 5. - Ufa, 1994.
- Bikbaev R. The poet’s word is the poet’s conscience. - Ufa, 1997.
- Bikbaev R. “Rami. A Book about the Poet”. Ufa, “Gilem,” 2007. 487 pages (in Bashkir).
- Bikbaev R. “Rami. A Book about the Poet”. Ufa, “Gilem,” 2008. 606 pages (in Russian).
- Bikbaev R. “Omar Khayyam’s Rubaiyat in Rami Garipov’s Bashkir Translation”, “Problems of Oriental Studies,” 2013 (in Russian).
- Bikbaev R. “Rami: A Book about the Poet” (Series: Outstanding Personalities of Bashkortostan). Ufa, “Kitap,” 2022. 680 pages (in Russian, translated from Bashkir by G.Ya. Khammatova)
- “Karim M., Garipov R., Bikbaev R. Study Edition” / Compiled by I.A. Sharapov. Ufa, “Kitap,” 2009. 192 pages (in Bashkir).

== Links ==
digitized works in National Library named after Akhmet-Zaki Validi of the Republic of Bashkortostan

- in the Bashkir language

other sources

- Rami, the beginning of the journey - Ravil Bikbai
- Mazhit Alkin “Strokes to the Portrait of Rami Garipov”
- Article of memory
