= Asyanovo =

Asyanovo Асяново
- Selo
- Location within Bashkortostan Location within Russia
- Coordinates: 55°26′N 54°43′E
- Country: Russia
- Region: Bashkortostan
- District: Dyurtyulinsky District
- Time zone: UTC+5:00

Asyanovo (Russian: Асяново; Bashkir: Әсән, Äsän) is a rural locality (a selo) and the administrative centre of Asyanovsky Selsoviet, Dyurtyulinsky District, Bashkortostan, Russia. The population was 1,479 as of 2010. There are 2 streets.

== Geography ==
Asyanovo is located 16 km southwest of Dyurtyuli (the district's administrative centre) by road. Verkhnekargino is the nearest rural locality.
