= Klyashevo, Iglinsky District, Republic of Bashkortostan =

Klyashevo Кляшево
- Selo
- Location within Bashkortostan Location within Russia
- Coordinates: 54°54′N 56°23′E
- Country: Russia
- Region: Bashkortostan
- District: Iglinsky District
- Time zone: UTC+5:00

Klyashevo (Russian: Кляшево, Bashkir: Келәш, Keläş) is a rural locality (a selo) in Ukteyevsky Selsoviet, Iglinsky District, Bashkortostan, Russia. The population was 168 as of 2010. There are 3 streets.

== Geography ==
Klyashevo is located 10 km north of Iglino (the district's administrative centre) by road. Starye Karashidy is the nearest rural locality.
