= Coat of arms of Bashkortostan =

Emblem of the Republic of Bashkortostan, Russia

Coat of arms of the Republic of Bashkortostan
- Armiger: Republic of Bashkortostan
- Adopted: 12 October 1993
- Use: On treaties, commissions, and more

The coat of arms of Bashkortostan (Note: Bashkir: Башҡортостан Республикаһының Дәүләт гербы, romanized: Başqortostan Respublikahınıñ Dəwlət gerbı, Russian: Государственный герб Республики Башкортостан.) is a national symbol of the Republic of Bashkortostan, Russia.

== Description ==
It features the monument to Salavat Yulaev in Ufa against the rising of the sun and its rays, inscribed in the circle framed with the national ornament. Below shows the inflorescence of the Bashkor rose (Pleurospermum uralense), painted in the colors of the national flag of Bashkortostan, with an inscription of the name "Bashkortostan" (Bashkir: Башҡортостан) on white.

== History ==
Emblem of the Bashkir Autonomous Soviet Socialist Republic
- Armiger: Bashkir Autonomous Soviet Socialist Republic
- Adopted: 1925
- Crest: Red star
- Supporters: Wheat and Cotton
- Motto: «Бөтә илдәрҙең пролетарийҙәре, берләшегеҙ!» (Bashkir) «Пролетарии всех стран, соединяйтесь!» (Russian) "Workers of the world, unite!" (English)
- Earlier version(s): 1925, 1937, and 1978

=== First revision ===
The coat of arms of the Bashkir ASSR was approved at the 5th Congress of Soviets of the Bashkir ASSR between 21 and 27 March 1925, when the Constitution of the Bashkir ASSR was ratified (then rejected by the special commission of the Central Executive Committee of the RSFSR).

The coat of arms is similar the emblem of the RSFSR, but was supplemented with inscriptions in the Bashkir language.

The symbols of the BASSR were to be described in the 8th chapter of the Constitution of the Bashkir Autonomous Soviet Socialist Republic.

==== Proposed emblem ====
In the congress, a draft proposal of the emblem of the Bashkir ASSR was designed, with the main element of which was a rider with a banner. The author of projects was A. E. Tyulkin. However, the coat of arms was not approved.

=== Second revision ===
The Constitution (Basic Law) of Bashkiria was adopted by the Tenth Congress of Soviets on 23 June 1937. The coat of arms was described in article 111. The coat of arms still resembles the emblem of the RSFSR.

=== Third revision ===
On 30 May 1978, the 8th Extraordinary Session of the 9th Supreme Soviet of the BASSR adopted the new Constitution of the Bashkir ASSR. The coat of arms was described in Article 157. In general, state symbols remained unchanged, and a red star is added to the emblem of the Bashkir ASSR.

== Gallery ==
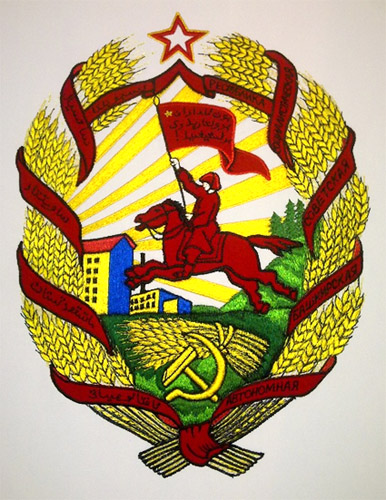
Proposed Emblem of the Bashkir ASSR (1925)

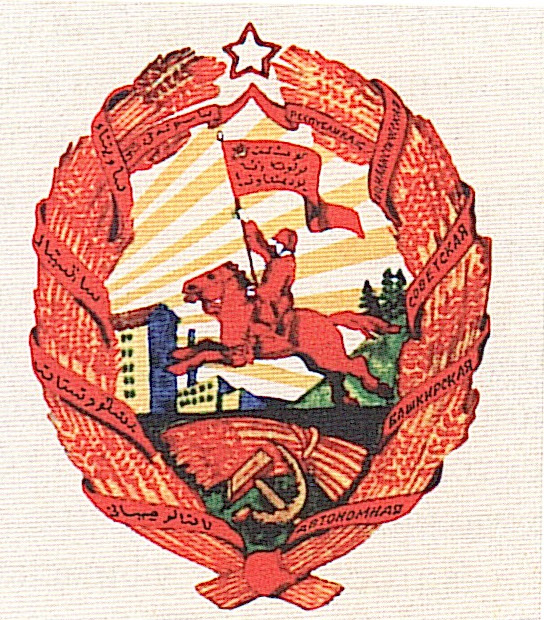
Proposed Emblem of the Bashkir ASSR (1925)

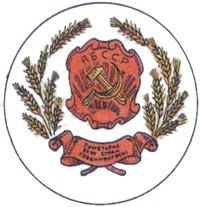
Emblem of the Bashkir ASSR (1925–1937)

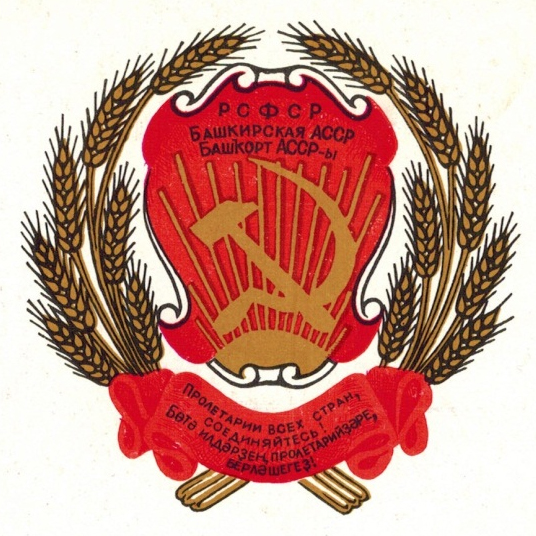
Emblem of the Bashkir ASSR (1937–1978)

Emblem of the Bashkir ASSR (1978–1992), and the Republic of Bashkortostan (1992–1993)

== See also ==
- Flag of the Republic of Bashkortostan
