= Arkaulovo =

Arkaulovo Аркаулово
- Selo
- Location within Bashkortostan Location within Russia
- Coordinates: 55°23′N 57°55′E
- Country: Russia
- Region: Bashkortostan
- District: Salavatsky District
- Time zone: UTC+5:00

Arkaulovo (Russian: Аркаулово; Bashkir: Арҡауыл, Arqawıl) is a rural locality (a selo) and the administrative centre of Arkaulovsky Selsoviet, Salavatsky District, Bashkortostan, Russia. The population was 1,439 as of 2010. There are 17 streets.

== Geography ==
Arkaulovo is located 34 km northwest of Maloyaz (the district's administrative centre) by road. Beshevlyarovo is the nearest rural locality.
