= Klyashevo, Chishminsky District, Republic of Bashkortostan =

Klyashevo Кляшево
- Selo
- Location within Bashkortostan Location within Russia
- Coordinates: 54°33′N 55°39′E
- Country: Russia
- Region: Bashkortostan
- District: Chishminsky District
- Time zone: UTC+5:00

Klyashevo (Russian: Кляшево, Bashkir: Келәш, Keläş) is a rural locality (a selo) in Arovsky Selsoviet, Chishminsky District, Bashkortostan, Russia. The rural locality has 18 streets and, as of 2010, a population of 560.

== Geography ==
Klyashevo is located 23 km east of Chishmy, the district's administrative centre. Dubrava is the nearest rural locality.
