= Blagoveshchensk constituency (Bashkortostan) =

Blagoveshchensk single-member constituency
- Constituency of the Russian State Duma

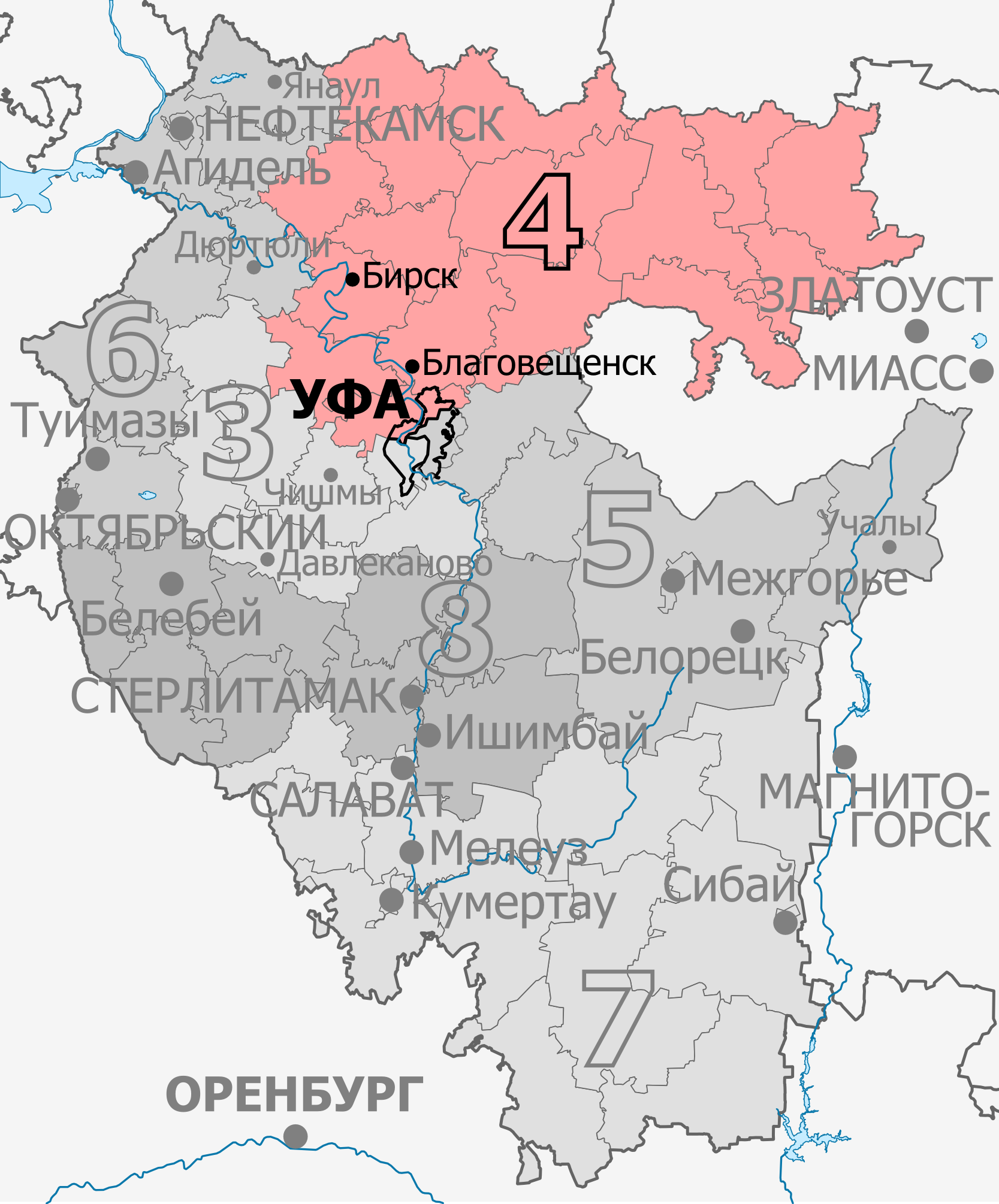
- Constituency boundaries since 2016
- Deputy: Yulai Kidrasov; United Russia
- Federal subject: Republic of Bashkortostan
- Districts: Askinsky, Baltachevsky, Belokataysky, Birsky, Blagoveshchensky, Burayevsky, Duvansky, Karaidelsky, Kiginsky, Kushnarenkovsky, Mechetlinsky, Mishkinsky, Nurimanovsky, Salavatsky, Tatyshlinsky, Ufa (Leninsky, Ordzhonikidzevsky), Ufimsky (Alekseyevsky, Cherkassky, Dmitriyevsky, Karmasansky, Krasnoyarsky, Mikhaylovsky, Milovsky, Nikolayevsky, Shemyaksky)
- Voters: 502,378 (2026)

The Blagoveshchensk constituency (No.4 (Note: Birsk constituency No.3 in 1993-2003, Ordzhonikidzevsky constituency No.6 in 2003-2007)) is a Russian legislative constituency in Bashkortostan. The constituency covers parts of Ufa as well as northern and north-eastern Bashkiria. The present day Blagoveshchensk constituency was created in 2015 from parts of former Ordzhonikidzevsky, Kalininsky and Sovetsky constituencies.

The constituency has been represented since 2026 by United Russia deputy Yulai Kidrasov, former Member of State Assembly of the Republic of Bashkortostan and construction businessman, who won the open seat after defeating three-term United Russia incumbent Rafael Mardanshin in the primary.

== Boundaries ==
1993–2003 Birsk constituency: Agidel, Askinsky District, Baltachevsky District, Belokataysky District, Birsk, Birsky District, Buzdyaksky District, Burayevsky District, Duvansky District, Dyurtyuli, Dyurtyulinsky District, Kaltasinsky District, Karaidelsky District, Kiginsky District, Krasnokamsky District, Mechetlinsky District, Mishkinsky District, Neftekamsk, Nurimanovsky District, Salavatsky District, Tatyshlinsky District, Yanaul, Yanaulsky District
The constituency covered the entirety of northern Bashkiria and north-central parts of the republic, including the towns of Agidel, Birsk, Neftekamsk, Yanaul and oil-rich areas in the northwest.

2003–2007 Ordzhonikidzevsky constituency: Agidel, Neftekamsk, Bakalinsky District, Birsk, Birsky District, Blagoveshchensk, Blagoveshchensky District, Dyurtyuli, Dyurtyulinsky District, Ilishevsky District, Kaltasinsky District, Krasnokamsky District, Sharansky District, Ufa (Ordzhonikizdevsky)
The constituency was significantly altered after the 2003 redistricting, losing the entirety of rural northern and north-eastern Bashkiria to Klaininsky constituency. The constituency instead stretched southwards along the Syun river (formerly Tuymazy constituency) as well as to the south-east to Ufa, gaining Ordzhinikidzevsky District of the city and Blagoveshchensk from Oktyabrsky constituency.

2016–present: Askinsky District, Baltachevsky District, Belokataysky District, Birsky District, Blagoveshchensky District, Burayevsky District, Duvansky District, Karaidelsky District, Kiginsky District, Kushnarenkovsky District, Mechetlinsky District, Mishkinsky District, Nurimanovsky District, Salavatsky District, Tatyshlinsky District, Ufa (Leninsky, Ordzhonikidzevsky), Ufimsky (Alexeyevka, Cherkassy, Dmitriyevka, Karmasan, Krasny Yar, Mikhaylovka, Milovka, Nikolayevka, Oktyabrsky)
The constituency was re-created for the 2016 election and received a new name "Blagoveshchensk constituency". This seat retained Ordzhonikidzevsky District of Ufa and suburban and exurban areas to the north of the city, including Blagoveshchensk. The constituency regained most of northern and north-eastern Bashkortostan from the dissolved Kalininsky constituency.

== Members elected ==
Election	Member	Party
1993	Ramil Mirsayev	Independent
1995	Alzam Saifullin (Note: died in August 1997)	Agrarian Party
1998	Vladimir Protopopov	Our Home – Russia
1999	Ragib Gimayev	Fatherland – All Russia
2003	Aleksandr Furman	United Russia
2007	Proportional representation - no election by constituency	
2011	Proportional representation - no election by constituency	
2016	Ildar Bikbayev	United Russia
2021	Rafael Mardanshin	United Russia
2026	Yulai Kidrasov	United Russia

== Election results ==
=== 1993 ===
==== Declared candidates ====
- Robert Akhiyarov (Independent), businessman
- Alim Akhmadeyev (Independent), Birsk State Pedagogical Institute professor
- Vladimir Gofman (Independent), geologist
- Marat Malikov (Independent), Bashkir State University department of constitutional law head
- Ramil Mirsayev (Independent), Member of Supreme Council of Bashkortostan (1990–present), Deputy Minister of Agriculture and Food of Bashkortostan (1991–present)
- Yury Sharipov (Civic Union), former People's Deputy of the Soviet Union (1989–1991), telecommunications executive
- Boris Tsynyshev (Independent), kolkhoz chairman

==== Results ====
Summary of the 12 December 1993 Russian legislative election in the Birsk constituency
Candidate	Party	Votes	%
Ramil Mirsayev	Independent	123,281	37.53%
Robert Akhiyarov	Independent	–	11.53%
Alim Akhmadeyev	Independent	–	–
Vladimir Gofman	Independent	–	–
Marat Malikov	Independent	–	–
Yury Sharipov	Civic Union	–	–
Boris Tsynyshev	Independent	–	–
Total		328,510	100%

=== 1995 ===
==== Declared candidates ====
- Eduard Khusnutdinov (Independent), journalist
- Alzam Saifullin (APR), First Deputy Mayor of Dyurtyuli and Dyurtyulinsky District – Head of the Department of Agriculture
- Nur Salikhov (Independent), kolkhoz chairman
- Viktor Vishnyakov (LDPR), Member of State Duma (1994–present)

==== Declined ====
- Ramil Mirsayev (Independent), incumbent Member of State Duma (1994–present)

==== Results ====
Summary of the 17 December 1995 Russian legislative election in the Birsk constituency
Candidate	Party	Votes	%
Alzam Saifullin	Agrarian Party	174,591	47.12%
Nur Salikhov	Independent	103,251	27.87%
Eduard Khusnutdinov	Independent	45,668	12.33%
Viktor Vishnyakov	Liberal Democratic Party	21,780	5.88%
against all		18,556	5.01%
Total		370,516	100%

=== 1998 ===
==== Declared candidates ====
- Rafis Kadyrov (Independent), billionaire banker, 1993 presidential candidate
- Fargat Khabibullin (Independent), union leader
- Flyus Khabibullin (Independent), businessman
- Rim Niyazgulov (Independent), museum director, Muslim activist
- Yury Ostanin (Independent)
- Vladimir Protopopov (NDR), Member of State Assembly of the Republic of Bashkortostan (1995–present), Neftekamsk Automotive Plant director general
- Yury Sadykov (Independent), former People's Deputy of Russia (1990–1993)
- Firat Valeyev (Uzille) (Independent), journalist
- Anver Yumagulov (Independent), human rights activist, journalist

==== Results ====
Summary of the 8 February 1998 by-election in the Birsk constituency
Candidate	Party	Votes	%
Vladimir Protopopov	Our Home – Russia	133,037	44.76%
Fargat Khabibullin	Independent	67,942	22.86%
Rafis Kadyrov	Independent	23,276	7.83%
Yury Sadykov	Independent	18,778	6.32%
Flyus Khabibullin	Independent	7,131	2.40%
Firat Valeyev (Uzille)	Independent	5,963	2.01%
Yury Ostanin	Independent	5,963	2.01%
Rim Niyazgulov	Independent	4,699	1.58%
Anver Yumagulov	Independent	3,984	1.34%
against all		13,532	4.55%
Total		297,223	100%

=== 1999 ===
==== Declared candidates ====
- Ural Fatikhov (Independent), attorney
- Ragib Gimayev (OVR), former Member of Supreme Council of Bashkortostan (1980–1995), rector of Bashkir State University (1981–present)
- Pyotr Iltimirov (Independent), insurance executive
- Irek Ishbuldin (Independent), college lecturer
- Vera Seksyayeva (CPRF), math teacher
- Firat Valeyev (Uzille) (Yabloko), journalist, 1998 candidate for this seat

==== Withdrawn candidates ====
- Eduard Khusnutdinov (Independent), journalist, 1995 candidate for this seat

==== Did not file ====
- Svetlana Demyanova (Women of Russia), community activist
- Nina Nasibullina (KTR–zSS), gymnasium deputy principal
- Sergey Shuvalov (LDPR)

==== Declined ====
- Vladimir Protopopov (Independent), incumbent Member of State Duma (1998–present)

==== Results ====
Summary of the 19 December 1999 Russian legislative election in the Birsk constituency
Candidate	Party	Votes	%
Ragib Gimayev	Fatherland – All Russia	195,442	51.33%
Vera Seksyayeva	Communist Party	74,704	19.62%
Firat Valeyev (Uzille)	Yabloko	26,600	6.99%
Pyotr Iltimirov	Independent	18,852	4.95%
Ural Fatikhov	Independent	15,626	4.10%
Irek Ishbuldin	Independent	13,522	3.55%
against all		28,534	7.49%
Total		380,728	100%

=== 2003 ===
==== Declared candidates ====
- Darya Bogdanova (ORP Rus'), political strategist
- Pavel Dikov (Rodina), attorney
- Rafail Dzhalilov (Independent), billionaire businessman
- Aleksandr Furman (United Russia), TNK executive
- Mikhail Generalov (Independent), unemployed
- Irek Ishbuldin (Independent), individual entrepreneur, 1999 candidate for this seat
- Eduard Khusnutdinov (Yabloko), journalist, human rights activist, 1995 and 1999 candidate for this seat
- Vyacheslav Kvyat (Independent), Member of State Assembly of the Republic of Bashkortostan (2003–present), businessman, father of Daniil Kvyat
- Guzalia Nigmatullina (Independent), middle school principal
- Vera Seksyayeva (CPRF), chairwoman of the People's Patriotic Union of Russia regional office, 1999 candidate for this seat
- Rafis Zarifyanov (LDPR), party coordinator in Neftekamsk

==== Did not file ====
- Vadim Abdrashitov (Independent), filmmaker
- Radik Knyazev (Independent), individual entrepreneur
- Aleksandr Kulagin (Independent), garden cooperative chairman
- Nina Nasibullina (Independent), Russian and literature teacher, 1999 candidate for this seat
- Rinat Nizamov (Independent), economist
- Alina Rakayeva (Independent), college administrator
- Alik Timerkayev (APR), kolkhoz chairman
- Rima Vodenko (Independent), Trade Representative of Bashkortostan in the Khanty-Mansi Autonomous Okrug

==== Declined ====
- Ragib Gimayev (Independent), incumbent Member of State Duma (2000–present) (ran in the Kirovsky constituency)

==== Results ====
Summary of the 7 December 2003 Russian legislative election in the Ordzhonikidzevsky constituency
Candidate	Party	Votes	%
Aleksandr Furman	United Russia	143,541	39.81%
Vyacheslav Kvyat	Independent	67,407	18.70%
Vera Seksyayeva	Communist Party	29,020	8.05%
Rafis Zarifyanov	Liberal Democratic Party	15,112	4.19%
Rafail Dzhalilov	Independent	14,194	3.94%
Irek Ishbuldin	Independent	13,141	3.64%
Darya Bogdanova	United Russian Party Rus'	12,182	3.38%
Pavel Dikov	Rodina	12,148	3.37%
Mikhail Generalov	Independent	5,724	1.59%
against all		29,378	8.15%
Total		361,007	100%

=== 2016 ===
==== Declared candidates ====
- Valiakhmet Badretdinov (A Just Russia), former Member of State Assembly of the Republic of Bashkortostan (1999–2003), journalist
- Ildar Bikbayev (United Russia), chief of staff to the Civic Chamber of Bashkortostan, 2014 Patriots of Russia presidential candidate
- Rafis Kadyrov (Rodina), billionaire banker, 1993 and 1998 presidential candidate, 1998 candidate for this seat
- Rustam Khafizov (CPRF), Member of Ufa City Council (2012–present), gas businessman
- Alla Kuzmina (Party of Growth), businesswoman
- Oleg Likhachyov (CPCR), actor, songwriter
- Vyacheslav Ryabov (LDPR), Member of Ufa City Council (2012–present), aide to State Duma member Vladimir Zhirinovsky

==== Withdrawn candidates ====
- Rafail Dzhalilov (Patriots of Russia), billionaire businessman, 2003 candidate for this seat

==== Failed to qualify ====
- Yelena Anokhina (Independent), chemical lab assistant

==== Declined ====
- Ramazan Ramazanov (United Russia), Member of State Assembly of the Republic of Bashkortostan (2013–present), oil executive (lost the primary)

==== Results ====
Summary of the 18 September 2016 Russian legislative election in the Blagoveshchensk constituency
Candidate	Party	Votes	%
Ildar Bikbayev	United Russia	186,444	50.55%
Vyacheslav Ryabov	Liberal Democratic Party	57,008	15.46%
Rustam Khafizov	Communist Party	36,253	9.83%
Valiakhmet Badretdinov	A Just Russia	26,864	7.28%
Rafis Kadyrov	Rodina	26,397	7.16%
Oleg Likhachyov	Communists of Russia	15,988	4.33%
Alla Kuzmina	Party of Growth	13,773	3.73%
Total		368,827	100%

=== 2021 ===
==== Declared candidates ====
- Kristina Abramicheva (Yabloko), Member of Bashkortostan Council for Human Rights (2019–present), art critic
- Zulfia Bagautdinova (The Greens), medical businesswoman
- Anton Belonogov (New People), businessman
- Ramil Biktimirov (RPPSS), retired Russian Navy captain 1st rank
- Dmitry Ivanov (LDPR), Member of State Assembly of the Republic of Bashkortostan (2018–present), aide to State Duma member Ivan Sukharev
- Rafael Mardanshin (United Russia), Member of State Duma (2011–present)
- Aleksey Nilov (SR–ZP), Member of State Assembly of the Republic of Bashkortostan (2018–present), lawyer
- Yevgeny Romanchikov (CPRF), construction businessman
- Sania Timasova (Party of Growth), businesswoman

==== Declined ====
- Ildar Bikbayev (United Russia), incumbent Member of State Duma (2016–present) (ran on the party list)

==== Results ====
Summary of the 17-19 September 2021 Russian legislative election in the Blagoveshchensk constituency
Candidate	Party	Votes	%
Rafael Mardanshin	United Russia	256,876	64.11%
Yevgeny Romanchikov	Communist Party	53,807	13.43%
Aleksey Nilov	A Just Russia — For Truth	23,653	5.90%
Dmitry Ivanov	Liberal Democratic Party	18,938	4.73%
Ramil Biktimirov	Party of Pensioners	13,575	3.39%
Anton Belonogov	New People	11,569	2.89%
Zulfia Bagautdinova	The Greens	8,444	2.11%
Kristina Abramicheva	Yabloko	5,639	1.41%
Sania Timasova	Party of Growth	3,306	0.83%
Total		400,678	100%

=== 2026 ===
==== Declared candidates ====
- Vildan Abrarov (The Greens), singer, event host
- Azat Adelmurdin (New People), entrepreneur
- Lyaisan Garipova (LDPR), Member of Iglinsky District Council (2024–present), aide to State Duma member Ivan Sukharev
- Airat Khanov (RPPSS), oncology professor
- Yulai Kidrasov (United Russia), Member of State Assembly of the Republic of Bashkortostan (2023–present), construction businessman
- Artur Shainurov (CPRF), Deputy Chairman of the Ufa City Council (2021–present), former Deputy Prime Minister of Bashkortostan (2013–2017), 2024 head candidate
- Rustam Shorov (A Just Russia), Member of State Assembly of the Republic of Bashkortostan (2023–present), businessman

==== Declined ====
- Rustem Akhunov (United Russia), Member of State Assembly of the Republic of Bashkortostan (2018–present), economic researcher (lost the primary)
- Rafael Mardanshin (United Russia), incumbent Member of State Duma (2011–present) (lost the primary)
- Alfit Nigamatyanov (United Russia), Member of State Assembly of the Republic of Bashkortostan (2023–present) (lost the primary)
- Svetlana Turazyanova (United Russia), former Member of State Assembly of the Republic of Bashkortostan (2018–2023) (lost the primary)

==== Results ====
Summary of the 18-20 September 2026 Russian legislative election in the Blagoveshchensk constituency
Candidate	Party	Votes	%
Yulai Kidrasov	United Russia	250,479	63.09%
Artur Shainurov	Communist Party	43,779	11.03%
Lyaisan Garipova	Liberal Democratic Party	28,703	7.23%
Airat Khanov	Party of Pensioners	20,184	5.08%
Azat Adelmurdin	New People	17,404	4.38%
Vildan Abrarov	The Greens	17,134	4.32%
Rustam Shorov	A Just Russia	15,883	4.00%
Total		397,042	100%
