= Sovetsky constituency (Bashkortostan) =

Russian legislative constituency

Sovetsky single-member constituency
- Constituency of the Russian State Duma
- Deputy: None
- Federal subject: Republic of Bashkortostan
- Districts: Blagovarsky, Buzdyaksky, Chekmagushevsky, Kushnarenkovsky, Oktyabrsky, Tuymazinsky, Ufa (Dyomsky, Leninsky, Sovetsky), Ufimsky (parts), Yermekeyevsky
- Voters: 508,952 (2003)

The Sovetsky constituency (No.7 (Note: Tuymazy constituency No.7 in 1993-1995, Tuymazy constituency No.8 in 1995-2003)) was a Russian legislative constituency in Bashkortostan in 1993–2007. It was based in central Bashkiria, centred on Tuymazy. The seat was last occupied by United Russia deputy Vener Kamaletdinov, former Head of Blagovarsky District, who won the open-seat race in the 2003 election.

The constituency was dissolved in 2007 when State Duma adopted full proportional representation for the next two electoral cycles. Sovetsky constituency was not re-established for the 2016 election, currently the territory of former Sovetsky constituency partitioned between Ufa, Neftekamsk and Sterlitamak constituencies.

== Boundaries ==
1993–1995 Tuymazy constituency: Alsheyevsky District, Bakalinsky District, Belebey, Belebeyevsky District, Bizhbulyaksky District, Blagovarsky District, Chekmagushevsky District, Davlekanovo, Davlekanovsky District, Ilishevsky District, Miyakinsky District, Oktyabrsky, Sharansky District, Tuymazinsky District, Tuymazy, Yermekeyevsky District
The constituency covered western Bashkortostan, including the towns of Belebey, Davlekanovo, Oktyabrsky and Tuymazy.

1995–2003 Tuymazy constituency: Alsheyevsky District, Bakalinsky District, Belebey, Belebeyevsky District, Bizhbulyaksky District, Blagovarsky District, Buzdyaksky District, Chekmagushevsky District, Davlekanovo, Davlekanovsky District, Ilishevsky District, Miyakinsky District, Oktyabrsky, Sharansky District, Tuymazinsky District, Tuymazy, Yermekeyevsky District
After 1995 redistricting the constituency retained all of its territory and gained rural Buzdyaksky District in the west-central part of the republic from Birsk constituency.

2003–2007: Blagovarsky District, Buzdyaksky District, Chekmagushevsky District, Kushnarenkovsky District, Oktyabrsky, Tuymazinsky District, Tuymazy, Ufa (Dyomsky, Leninsky, Sovetsky), Ufimsky District (Alexeyevka, Dmitriyevka, Karmasan, Krasny Yar, Mikhaylovka, Nikolayevka, Oktyabrsky), Yermekeyevsky District
Following the 2003 redistricting, the constituency was significantly altered and renamed "Sovetsky constituency". It lost its southern portion, including Belebey and Davlekanovo to Kirovsky constituency and its northern portion to Ordzhonikidzevsky constituency. The constituency retained only Tuymazy and parts of central Bashkiria, as well as was stretched to Ufa, gaining three city districts from Kirov constituency.

== Members elected ==
Election	Member	Party
1993	Zifkat Sayetgaliyev	Independent
1995	Zifkat Sayetgaliyev	Agrarian Party
1999	Franis Saifullin	Fatherland – All Russia
2003	Vener Kamaletdinov	United Russia

== Election results ==
=== 1993 ===
==== Declared candidates ====
- Anvar Galimov (Independent), Member of Supreme Soviet of the Republic of Bashkortostan (1990–present), former First Secretary of the CPSU Yermekeyevsky District Committee (1986–1991)
- Anatoly Grishenkov (Independent), Member of Supreme Soviet of the Republic of Bashkortostan (1990–present), banker
- Gennady Kulik (APR), former Member of the Committee for Operative Management of National Economy of the Soviet Union (1991), former People's Deputy of the Soviet Union (1989–1991)
- Vladimir Merzlyakov (Independent), Member of Supreme Soviet of the Republic of Bashkortostan (1990–present), oil executive
- Rinat Mukhtarov (Independent), pediatric surgeon
- Zifkat Sayetgaliyev (Independent), Member of Supreme Soviet of the Republic of Bashkortostan (1990–present), former First Secretary of the CPSU Alsheyevsky District Committee (1982–1988)

==== Results ====
Summary of the 12 December 1993 Russian legislative election in the Tuymazy constituency
Candidate	Party	Votes	%
Zifkat Sayetgaliyev	Independent	122,742	37.38%
Vladimir Merzlyakov	Independent	59,622	18.16%
Rinat Mukhtarov	Independent	31,770	9.68%
Anatoly Grishenkov	Independent	31,622	9.63%
Anvar Galimov	Independent	24,854	7.57%
Gennady Kulik	Agrarian Party	11,557	3.52%
against all		17,299	5.27%
Total		328,353	100%

=== 1995 ===
==== Declared candidates ====
- Albert Akhmetov (Duma-96), businessman
- Sergey Dergunov (LDPR), aide to State Duma member
- Azat Idiatullin (ROD), Soviet–Afghan War veterans nonprofit executive
- Rafis Kadyrov (BSG), banker, 1993 presidential candidate
- Boris Minigulov (SMR), businessman
- Zifkat Sayetgaliyev (APR), incumbent Member of State Duma (1994–present)
- Lena Vakhitova (V–N!), consumer union chairwoman

==== Results ====
Summary of the 17 December 1995 Russian legislative election in the Tuymazy constituency
Candidate	Party	Votes	%
Zifkat Sayetgaliyev (incumbent)	Agrarian Party	228,558	59.49%
Lena Vakhitova	Power to the People	43,552	11.33%
Rafis Kadyrov	Stanislav Govorukhin Bloc	25,814	6.72%
Sergey Dergunov	Liberal Democratic Party	21,373	5.56%
Azat Idiatullin	Russian All-People's Movement	13,636	3.55%
Boris Minigulov	Union of Muslims	9,163	2.38%
Albert Akhmetov	Duma-96	5,562	1.45%
against all		31,337	8.16%
Total		384,226	100%

=== 1999 ===
==== Declared candidates ====
- Ramil Baitimirov (NDR), gas distribution executive
- Vladimir Bogdanov (Independent), banker
- Zagir Khakimov (Yabloko), Tatar culture activist
- Aleksandr Ovsyannikov (CPRF), pensioner
- Franis Saifullin (OVR), Minister of Agriculture and Food of Bashkortostan (1995–present)

==== Failed to qualify ====
- Vladimir Lysenkov (Independent)
- Yury Nikolayev (Independent)

==== Did not file ====
- Askhat Iskhakov (LDPR), adolescent doctor
- Zugura Kinzebayeva (Independent), Tatar culture centre specialist
- Vladimir Polyakov (DN)
- Florid Teregulov (Nikolayev–Fyodorov Bloc), former Mayor of Tuymazy (1990–1994)

==== Declined ====
- Zifkat Sayetgaliyev (OVR), incumbent Member of State Duma (1994–present)

==== Results ====
Summary of the 19 December 1999 Russian legislative election in the Tuymazy constituency
Candidate	Party	Votes	%
Franis Saifullin	Fatherland – All Russia	213,499	54.56%
Aleksandr Ovsyannikov	Communist Party	70,617	18.05%
Vladimir Bogdanov	Independent	41,387	10.58%
Zagir Khakimov	Yabloko	21,410	5.47%
Ramil Baitimirov	Our Home – Russia	13,313	3.40%
against all		23,594	6.03%
Total		391,285	100%

=== 2003 ===
==== Declared candidates ====
- Askar Fazlyyev (Independent), shopping mall administrator
- Azamat Iskuzhin (Independent), construction businessman
- Vener Kamaletdinov (United Russia), Head of Administration of Blagovarsky District (1992–present)
- Zagir Khakimov (VR–ES), aide to State Duma member, 1999 Yabloko candidate for this seat
- Sergey Kuznetsov (Yabloko), journalist
- Lilia Muratova (Independent), businesswoman
- Aleksandr Ovsyannikov (CPRF), nonprofit executive, 1999 candidate for this seat
- Vladimir Parkhomenko (Independent), Member of Leninsky District of Ufa Municipal Council, transportation businessman
- Zilya Shangareyeva (Independent), aide to State Duma member
- Sergey Sibiryakov (ORP Rus'), former Head of the Department of Largest Taxpayers at the Ministry for Tax and Revenue of Russia
- Anver Yumagulov (Independent), business consultant

==== Failed to qualify ====
- Aleksandr Ivanov (Independent), law firm executive director
- Radmir Khasanov (Independent), Member of State Assembly of the Republic of Bashkortostan (2003–present), dentist
- Vasily Mavrin (Independent), Head of the Leininsky District of Ufa Department of Construction
- Ravil Nasibullin (PVR-RPZh), Ufa State Aviation Technical University department head
- Konstantin Potnin (Greens), nonprofit director
- Igor Stepanov (Rodina), heating network operator

==== Did not file ====
- Razim Ayupov (APR), agricultural college director
- Nail Bakhtizin (Independent), Member of State Assembly of the Republic of Bashkortostan (2003–present)
- Vyacheslav Gilyazetdinov (SPS), businessman
- Kashbulla Kuskildin (Independent), oil preparation and stabilization master

==== Declined ====
- Franis Saifullin (United Russia), incumbent Member of State Duma (2000–present) (ran in the Kalininsky constituency)

==== Results ====
Summary of the 7 December 2003 Russian legislative election in the Sovetsky constituency
Candidate	Party	Votes	%
Vener Kamaletdinov	United Russia	90,988	24.44%
Lilia Muratova	Independent	72,035	19.35%
Sergey Kuznetsov	Yabloko	38,341	10.30%
Aleksandr Ovsyannikov	Communist Party	36,331	9.76%
Askar Fazlyyev	Independent	19,838	5.33%
Zagir Khakimov	Great Russia – Eurasian Union	17,502	4.70%
Vladimir Parkhomenko	Independent	13,303	3.57%
Zilya Shangareyeva	Independent	9,984	2.68%
Anver Yumagulov	Independent	7,020	1.89%
Sergey Sibiryakov	United Russian Party Rus'	6,904	1.85%
Azamat Iskuzhin	Independent	5,388	1.45%
against all		39,654	10.65%
Total		372,674	100%
