= Kalininsky constituency (Bashkortostan) =

Russian legislative constituency

Kalininsky single-member constituency
- Constituency of the Russian State Duma
- Deputy: None
- Federal subject: Republic of Bashkortostan
- Districts: Arkhangelsky, Askinsky, Baltachevsky, Belokataysky, Burayevsky, Duvansky, Gafuriysky, Iglinsky, Karaidelsky, Kiginsky, Mechetlinsky, Mishkinsky, Nurimanovsky, Salavatsky, Tatyshlinsky, Ufa (Kalininsky), Ufimsky (parts), Yanaul, Yanaulsky
- Voters: 461,198 (2003)

The Kalininsky constituency (No.3 (Note: No.4 in 1993-1995, Oktyabrsky constituency No.5 in 1995-2003)) was a Russian legislative constituency in Bashkortostan in 1993–2007. It covered most of rural northern and north-eastern Bashkiria as well as a small arm to Kalininsky city district of Ufa. The seat was last occupied by United Russia deputy Franis Saifullin, who carpetbagged in 2003 from Tuymazy constituency and defeated first-term People's Party incumbent Vladimir Pevtsov.

The constituency was dissolved in 2007 when State Duma adopted full proportional representation for the next two electoral cycles. Kalininsky constituency was not re-established for the 2016 election, currently the territory of former Kalininsky constituency partitioned between Ufa, Beloretsk and Neftekamsk constituencies.

== Boundaries ==
1993–1995: Blagoveshchensk, Blagoveshchensky District, Kushnarenkovsky District, Ufa (Kalininsky, Oktyabrsky, Ordzhonikidzevsky)
The constituency covered northern half of Ufa and its northern suburbs and exurbs, including the industrial town of Blagoveshchensk.

1995–2003 Oktyabrsky constituency: Blagoveshchensk, Blagoveshchensky District, Kushnarenkovsky District, Ufa (Kalininsky, Oktyabrsky, Ordzhonikidzevsky)
The constituency retained its territory but changed its name from Kalininsky to Oktyabrsky constituency.

2003–2007: Arkhangelsky District, Askinsky District, Baltachevsky District, Belokataysky District, Burayevsky District, Duvansky District, Gafuriysky District, Iglinsky District, Karaidelsky District, Kiginsky District, Mechetlinsky District, Mishkinsky District, Nurimanovsky District, Salavatsky District, Tatyshlinsky District, Ufa (Kalininsky), Ufimsky District (Cherkassy), Yanaul, Yanaulsky District
After the 2003 redistricting the constituency regained its old name but was significantly altered, retaining only Kalininsky city district of Ufa from its previous configuration, losing other portions of the city to Kirovsky and Ordzhonikidzevsky constituencies. In return, Kalininsky constituency gained almost all of northern and north-western Bashkiria from Birsk and Kirovsky constituencies.

== Members elected ==
Election	Member	Party
1993	Aleksandr Arinin	Party of Russian Unity and Accord
1995	Aleksandr Arinin	Independent
1999	Vladimir Pevtsov	Our Home – Russia
2003	Franis Saifullin	United Russia

== Election results ==
=== 1993 ===
==== Declared candidates ====
- Aleksandr Arinin (PRES), State Academy of Service Studies, Ufa Division department of Russian history and culture head
- Rashit Dayanov (Civic Union), businessman
- Arsen Nuridzhanov (Independent), businessman
- Viktor Rezyapov (Independent), Member of Supreme Soviet of the Republic of Bashkortostan (1990–present), Bashkirenergo college director

==== Results ====
Summary of the 12 December 1993 Russian legislative election in the Kalininsky constituency
Candidate	Party	Votes	%
Aleksandr Arinin	Party of Russian Unity and Accord	67,768	28.94%
Viktor Rezyapov	Independent	–	21.01%
Rashit Dayanov	Civic Union	–	–
Arsen Nuridzhanov	Independent	–	–
Total		234,131	100%

=== 1995 ===
==== Declared candidates ====
- Aleksandr Arinin (Independent), incumbent Member of State Duma (1994–present)
- Nikolay Astafyev (LDPR), Member of State Duma (1994–present), Chairman of the Duma Committee on Natural Resources (1994–present)
- Viktor Drozdenko (Power to the People), former People's Deputy of Russia (1990–1993)
- Raikhana Gilmanova (DOBRo), journalist
- Yelena Makhmutova (Independent), Bashkir Academy of Public Administration and Management department of psychology and sociology head
- Vladimir Petoshin (CPRF), pipefitter
- Viktor Rezyapov (Independent), former Member of Supreme Soviet of the Republic of Bashkortostan (1990–1995), Bashkirenergo college director, 1993 candidate for this seat
- Aleksandr Sergeyev (K–TR–zSS), mill operator
- Sergey Shikhovtsev (Social Democrats), pensioner

==== Results ====
Summary of the 17 December 1995 Russian legislative election in the Oktyabrsky constituency
Candidate	Party	Votes	%
Aleksandr Arinin (incumbent)	Independent	76,415	24.83%
Viktor Rezyapov	Independent	40,083	13.02%
Vladimir Petoshin	Communist Party	33,033	10.73%
Viktor Drozdenko	Power to the People	31,643	10.28%
Raikhana Gilmanova	Education — Future of Russia	29,703	9.65%
Aleksandr Sergeyev	Communists and Working Russia - for the Soviet Union	21,494	6.98%
Yelena Makhmutova	Independent	15,992	5.20%
Nikolay Astafyev	Liberal Democratic Party	8,964	2.91%
Sergey Shikhovtsev	Social Democrats	3,442	1.12%
against all		39,408	12.80%
Total		307,797	100%

=== 1999 ===
==== Declared candidates ====
- Rafika Amineva (ROS), gymnasium principal
- Makhmut Bikbulatov (Independent), Head of Administration of Ordzhonikidzevsky District of Ufa (1999–present)
- Viktor Drozdenko (Independent), former People's Deputy of Russia (1990–1993), 1995 candidate for this seat
- Azat Idiatullin (Russian Cause), Afghan War disabled veterans rights activist
- Guzel Iskhakova (Women of Russia), philosophy professor
- Rafis Kadyrov (Independent), banker, 1993 and 1998 presidential candidate
- Vladimir Petoshin (CPRF), Member of State Duma (1996–present), 1995 candidate for this seat
- Vladimir Pevtsov (NDR), First Deputy Minister of Health of Bashkortostan (1995–present)
- Aleksandr Sergeyev (KTR–zSS), Member of City Council of Ufa, mill operator, 1995 candidate for this seat
- Albert Slobodchikov (Independent), militsiya officer
- Mikhail Zaytsev (Independent), former Chairman of the State Assembly of the Republic of Bashkortostan (1995–1999)
- Nailya Zhiganshina (DN), unemployed

==== Failed to qualify ====
- Aleksandr Arinin (Independent), incumbent Member of State Duma (1994–present), 1998 presidential candidate
- Rim Niyazgulov (Independent), union activist
- Arsen Nuridzhanov (SPS), businessman

==== Did not file ====
- Aleksandr Arinushkin (Independent), priest
- Rasul Askarov (Independent)
- Zugura Rakhmatullina (Independent), Bashkir State University department of ethics, esthetics, and culturology assistant professor
- Nina Uskova (Independent), lyceum teacher

==== Results ====
Summary of the 19 December 1999 Russian legislative election in the Oktyabrsky constituency
Candidate	Party	Votes	%
Vladimir Pevtsov	Our Home – Russia	55,983	18.45%
Makhmut Bikbulatov	Independent	51,558	16.99%
Mikhail Zaytsev	Independent	39,574	13.04%
Vladimir Petoshin	Communist Party	28,871	9.52%
Rafis Kadyrov	Independent	20,473	6.75%
Aleksandr Sergeyev	Communists and Workers of Russia - for the Soviet Union	13,944	4.60%
Rafika Amineva	Russian All-People's Union	12,139	4.00%
Viktor Drozdenko	Independent	12,091	3.99%
Albert Slobodchikov	Independent	8,853	2.92%
Azat Idiatullin	Russian Cause	6,413	2.11%
Nailya Zhiganshina	Spiritual Heritage	2,171	0.72%
against all		44,214	14.57%
Total		303,380	100%

=== 2003 ===
==== Declared candidates ====
- Pavel Chugunov (ORP Rus'), unemployed
- Sergey Doynikov (Independent), marketing executive
- Vyacheslav Gilyazitdinov (SPS), businessman
- Khasan Idiyatullin (Independent), horse breeder, farmer
- Rinat Khazeyev (Independent), political strategist
- Ramil Mirsayev (Independent), former Deputy Prime Minister of Bashkortostan – Minister of Construction and Housing (2000–2003), former Member of State Duma (1994–1995)
- Igor Naumov (LDPR), undergraduate student
- Vladimir Petoshin (CPRF), former Member of State Duma (1996–1999), 1995 and 1999 candidate for this seat
- Vladimir Pevtsov (NPRF), incumbent Member of State Duma (2000–present)
- Vladimir Putenikhin (Independent), nonprofit chairman
- Franis Saifullin (United Russia), Member of State Duma (2000–present)

==== Withdrawn candidates ====
- Rasikh Minezyayev (APR), agricultural engineer

==== Did not file ====
- Rishat Magasumov (Independent), entrepreneur
- Marat Mukhtarov (Independent), nonprofit director

==== Declined ====
- Aleksandr Arinin (Independent), former Member of State Duma (1994–1999), 1998 presidential candidate (running for President of Bashkortostan)

==== Results ====
Summary of the 7 December 2003 Russian legislative election in the Kalininsky constituency
Candidate	Party	Votes	%
Franis Saifullin	United Russia	150,106	41.57%
Vladimir Pevtsov (incumbent)	People's Party	46,870	12.98%
Ramil Mirsayev	Independent	35,906	9.94%
Vladimir Petoshin	Communist Party	22,701	6.29%
Khasan Idiyatullin	Independent	17,917	4.96%
Igor Naumov	Liberal Democratic Party	13,101	3.63%
Vyacheslav Gilyazitdinov	Union of Right Forces	7,194	1.99%
Sergey Doynikov	Independent	7,062	1.96%
Pavel Chugunov	United Russian Party Rus'	4,622	1.28%
Vladimir Putenikhin	Independent	4,224	1.17%
Rinat Khazeyev	Independent	4,088	1.13%
against all		30,407	8.42%
Total		361,322	100%
