= Neftekamsk constituency =

Neftekamsk single-member constituency
- Constituency of the Russian State Duma

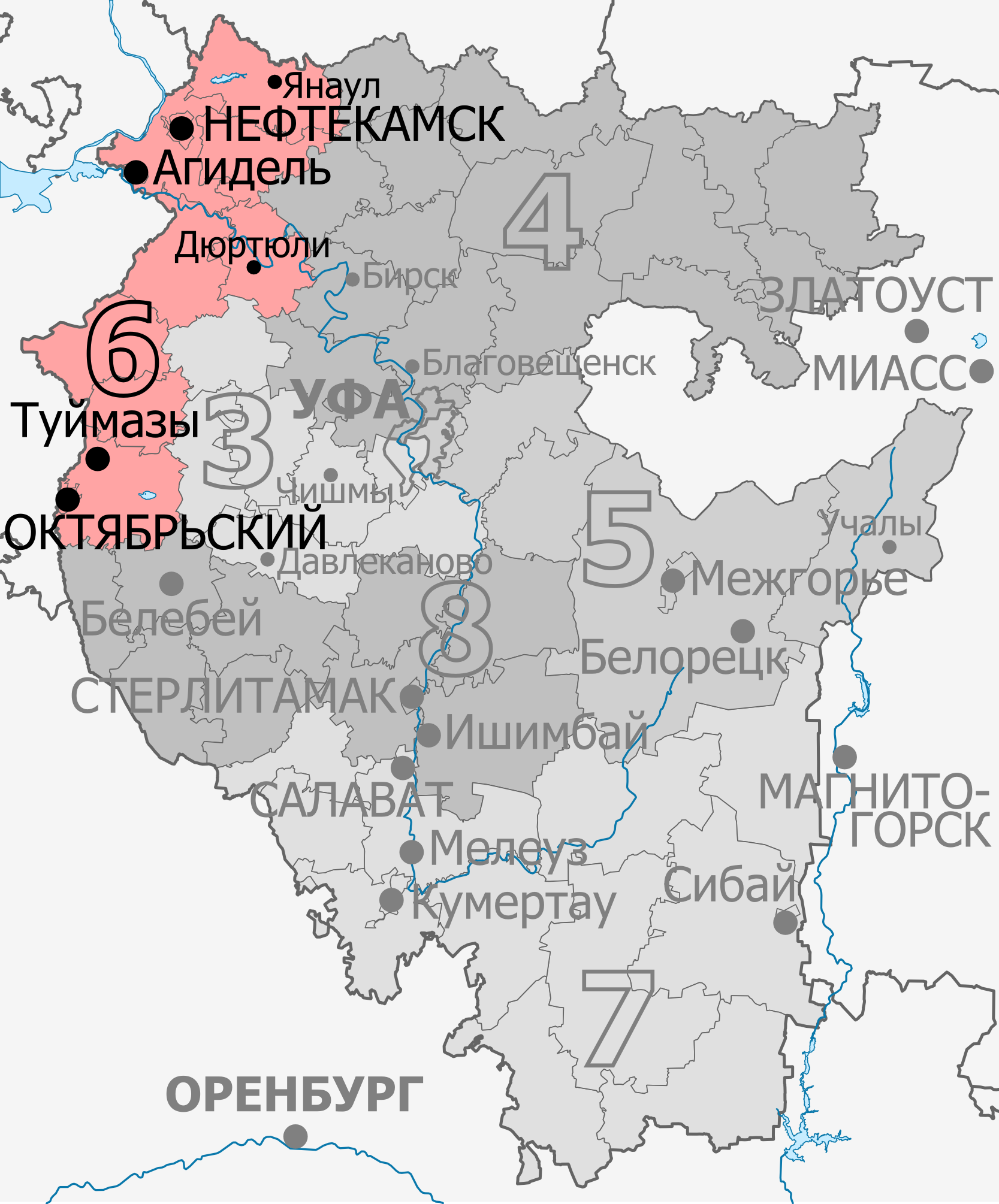
- Constituency boundaries since 2016
- Deputy: Aleksey Zhuravlyov; Rodina
- Federal subject: Bashkortostan
- Districts: Agidel, Neftekamsk, Oktyabrsky, Bakalinsky, Dyurtyulinsky, Ilishevsky, Kaltasinsky, Krasnokamsky, Tuymazinsky, Sharansky, Yanaulsky
- Voters: 455,528 (2026)

The Neftekamsk constituency (No.6) is a Russian legislative constituency in the Bashkortostan Republic. The constituency covers north-western Bashkiria, stretching from Yanaul in the north to Oktyabrsky in the south. Neftekamsk constituency was created in 2015 from parts of former Ordzhonikidzevsky (Neftekamsk and Agidel) and Sovetsky (Tuymazy and Oktyabrsky) constituencies.

The constituency has been represented since 2026 by Rodina party chairman Aleksey Zhuravlyov, a four-term State Duma member, who won the open seat, succeeding four-term incumbent and Civic Platform party chairman Rifat Shaykhutdinov.

== Boundaries ==
2016–present: Agidel, Bakalinsky District, Dyurtyulinsky District, Ilishevsky District, Kaltasinsky District, Krasnokamsky District, Neftekamsk, Oktyabrsky, Tuymazinsky District, Sharansky District, Yanaulsky District
The constituency was created in 2016 from eastern parts of the former Ordzhonikidzevsky (Neftekamsk and Agidel) and Sovetsky (Tuymazy and Oktyabrsky) constituencies.

== Members elected ==
Election	Member	Party
2016	Rifat Shaykhutdinov	Civic Platform
2021	Rifat Shaykhutdinov	Civic Platform
2026	Aleksey Zhuravlyov	Rodina

== Election results ==
=== 2016 ===
==== Declared candidates ====
- Sergey Anokhin (A Just Russia), businessman
- Ilgam Galin (CPRF), Member of State Assembly of the Republic of Bashkortostan (2013–present), construction executive
- Dmitry Ivanov (LDPR), postgraduate student
- Fairuza Latypova (Patriots of Russia), medical director
- Ramil Mugalimov (Rodina), IT executive
- Denis Musin (Party of Growth), nonprofit director
- Rifat Shaykhutdinov (GP), former Member of State Duma (2003–2011), chairman of the Civic Platform party (2014–present)

==== Withdrawn candidates ====
- Sergey Golovin (CPCR), unemployed

==== Failed to qualify ====
- Rashid Samigullin (Independent), individual entrepreneur

==== Declined ====
- Rima Batalova (United Russia), Member of State Duma (2011–present) (lost the primary, ran on the party list)
- Rafael Mardanshin (United Russia), Member of State Duma (2011–present) (won the primary, ran on the party list)

==== Results ====
Summary of the 18 September 2016 Russian legislative election in the Neftekamsk constituency
Candidate	Party	Votes	%
Rifat Shaykhutdinov	Civic Platform	146,324	43.99%
Ilgam Galin	Communist Party	72,422	21.77%
Sergey Anokhin	A Just Russia	31,040	9.33%
Dmitry Ivanov	Liberal Democratic Party	23,830	7.16%
Fairuza Latypova	Patriots of Russia	23,312	7.01%
Denis Musin	Party of Growth	18,011	5.42%
Ramil Mugalimov	Rodina	12,303	3.70%
Total		327,242	100%

=== 2021 ===
==== Declared candidates ====
- Rail Adiyatullin (United Russia), aide to State Duma member Mikhail Bugera
- Linara Battalova (RPPSS), associate professor of law
- Vyacheslav Byzov (Party of Growth), individual entrepreneur
- Ilgam Galin (CPRF), Member of State Assembly of the Republic of Bashkortostan (2013–present), 2016 candidate for this seat
- Oleg Isayev (New People), account manager
- Yury Rudakov (LDPR), Member of Meleuz City Council (2020–present), aide to State Duma member Vladimir Zhirinovsky
- Rufina Shagapova (The Greens), Member of State Assembly of the Republic of Bashkortostan (2013–present), co-chairwoman of the Russian Ecological Party "The Greens" (2021–present)
- Rifat Shaykhutdinov (GP), incumbent Member of State Duma (2003–2011, 2016–present), chairman of the Civic Platform party (2014–present)
- Olga Shevnina (SR–ZP), nonprofit executive
- Fyodor Vtoroy (Rodina), technician
- Konstantin Zarubin (Yabloko), farmer

==== Results ====
Summary of the 17-19 September 2021 Russian legislative election in the Neftekamsk constituency
Candidate	Party	Votes	%
Rifat Shaykhutdinov (incumbent)	Civic Platform	166,107	46.58%
Rail Adiyatullin	United Russia	66,535	18.66%
Ilgam Galin	Communist Party	52,744	14.79%
Linara Battalova	Party of Pensioners	13,784	3.87%
Oleg Isayev	New People	10,996	3.08%
Olga Shevnina	A Just Russia — For Truth	10,974	3.08%
Yury Rudakov	Liberal Democratic Party	9,128	2.56%
Rufina Shagapova	The Greens	6,291	1.76%
Vyacheslav Byzov	Party of Growth	5,634	1.58%
Konstantin Zarubin	Yabloko	4,788	1.34%
Fyodor Vtoroy	Rodina	4,508	1.26%
Total		356,697	100%

=== 2026 ===
==== Declared candidates ====
- Timur Gilmiyarov (United Russia), Member of State Assembly of the Republic of Bashkortostan (2018–present), agricultural executive
- Rishat Khanov (RPPSS), medical businessman
- Yury Rudakov (LDPR), Member of State Assembly of the Republic of Bashkortostan (2023–present), 2021 candidate for this seat
- Konstantin Shagimuratov (A Just Russia), former Chairman of the Control and Accounts Chamber of Bashkortostan (2019–2025), 2014 presidential candidate
- Dmitry Weissbrot (New People), Member of Oktyabrsky Council (2024–present), businessman
- Aleksey Zhuravlyov (Rodina), Member of State Duma (2011–present), chairman of the Rodina party (2012–present)

==== Withdrawn candidates ====
- Aleksey Akimenko (Yabloko), former Member of Agidel Council (2020–2024) (disqualified August 31, 2026, due to unlawful campaigning in banned social media)
- Ivan Lipovsky (CPRF), aide to State Duma member Alexander Yushchenko, retired Russian Navy captain lieutenant (withdrawn September 4, 2026, due to possession of foreign stock)

==== Declined ====
- Aleksey Gorbachyov (United Russia), Head of Krasnokamsky District (2023–present) (lost the primary)
- Salavat Kulbakhtin (United Russia), Head of the Bashkortostan Department of State Protection of Cultural Heritage (2022–present) (lost the primary)
- Rifat Shaykhutdinov (GP), incumbent Member of State Duma (2003–2011, 2016–present), chairman of the Civic Platform party (2014–present) (under criminal investigation since February 2026, party suspended by the Supreme Court of Russia since April 2026)

==== Results ====
Summary of the 18-20 September 2026 Russian legislative election in the Neftekamsk constituency
Candidate	Party	Votes	%
Aleksey Zhuravlyov	Rodina	196,842	53.94%
Timur Gilmiyarov	United Russia	102,386	26.06%
Konstantin Shagimuratov	A Just Russia	35,573	9.75%
Yury Rudakov	Liberal Democratic Party	12,423	3.40%
Dmitry Weissbrot	New People	10,388	2.85%
Rishat Khanov	Party of Pensioners	4,746	1.30%
Total		364,942	100%
