= Cherkassy, Russia =

Cherkassy (Russian: Черкассы) is the name of several rural localities in Russia:

- Cherkassy, Davlekanovsky District, Republic of Bashkortostan, a village in Sokolovsky Selsoviet of Davlekanovsky District in the Republic of Bashkortostan
- Cherkassy, Sterlitamaksky District, Republic of Bashkortostan, a village in Krasnoyarsky Selsoviet of Sterlitamaksky District in the Republic of Bashkortostan
- Cherkassy, Ufimsky District, Republic of Bashkortostan, a selo in Cherkassky Selsoviet of Ufimsky District in the Republic of Bashkortostan
- Cherkassy, Kursk Oblast, a khutor in Artyukhovsky Selsoviet of Oktyabrsky District in Kursk Oblast
- Cherkassy, Lipetsk Oblast, a selo in Cherkassky Selsoviet of Yeletsky District in Lipetsk Oblast; 52°42′N 38°44′E
- Cherkassy, Orenburg Oblast, a selo in Cherkassky Selsoviet of Saraktashsky District in Orenburg Oblast
- Cherkassy, Penza Oblast, a selo in Potlovsky Selsoviet of Kolyshleysky District in Penza Oblast
- Cherkassy, Tula Oblast, a selo in Yablonevsky Rural Okrug of Kamensky District in Tula Oblast
