= Ufimsky =

Ufimsky (masculine), Ufimskaya (feminine), or Ufimskoye (neuter) may refer to:

- Ufimsky District, a district of the Republic of Bashkortostan, Russia
- Ufimsky (rural locality) (Ufimskaya, Ufimskoye), name of several rural localities in Russia
