= Selo stantsii Yumatovo =

Selo stantsii Yumatovo Село станции Юматово
- Selo
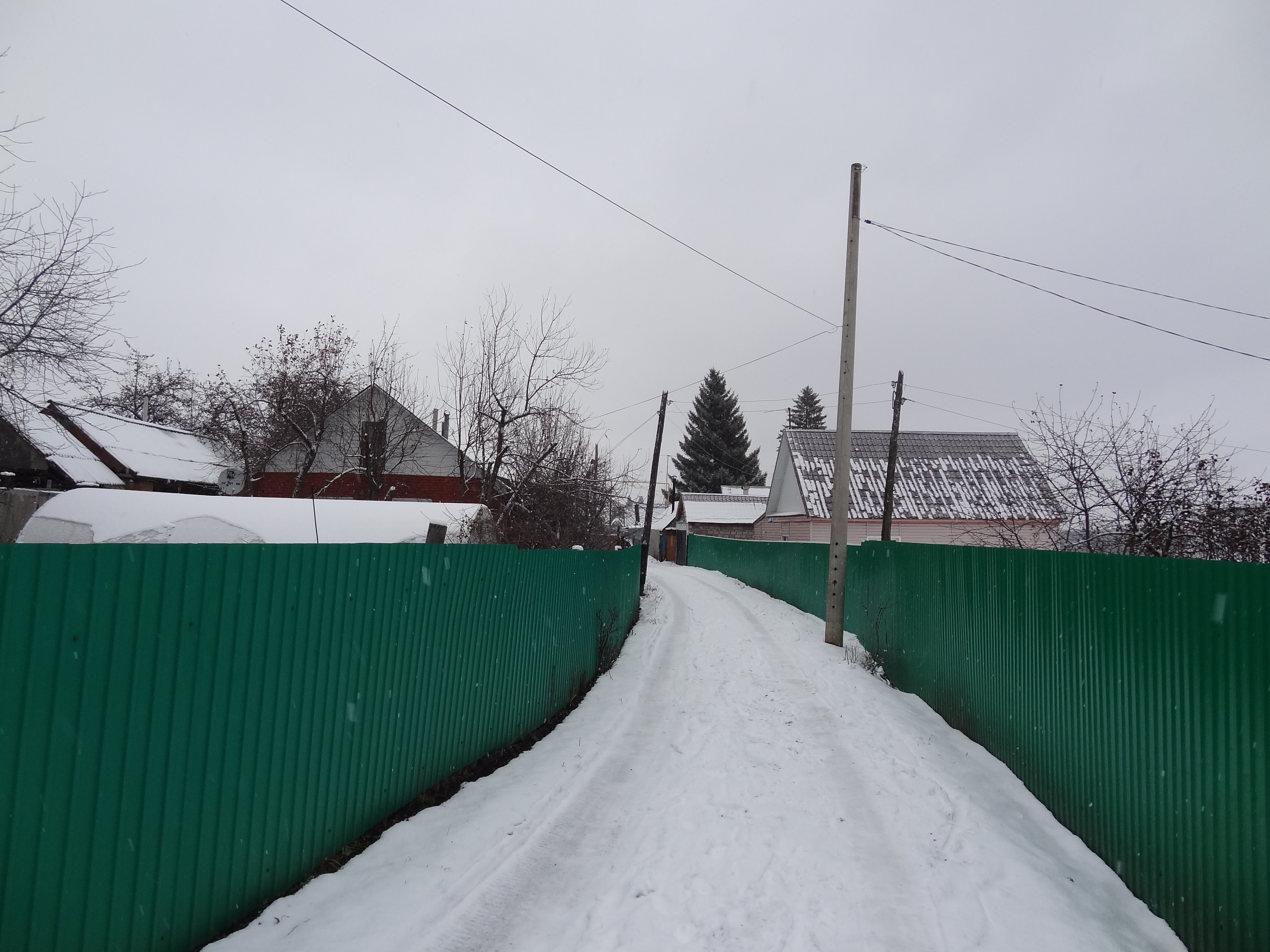
- Selo stantsii Yumatovo in 2015

- Location within Bashkortostan Location within Russia
- Coordinates: 54°37′N 55°41′E
- Country: Russia
- Region: Bashkortostan
- District: Ufimsky District
- Time zone: UTC+5:00

Selo stantsii Yumatovo (Russian: Село станции Юматово; Bashkir: Йоматау станцияһы, Yomataw stantsiyahı) is a rural locality (a selo) in Yumatovsky Selsoviet, Ufimsky District, Bashkortostan, Russia. The population was 688 as of 2010. There are 28 streets.

== Geography ==
Selo is located 32 km southwest of Ufa (the district's administrative centre) by road. Uptino is the nearest rural locality.
