= Kruchinino =

Kruchinino Кручинино
- Village
- Location within Bashkortostan Location within Russia
- Coordinates: 54°46′N 55°38′E
- Country: Russia
- Region: Bashkortostan
- District: Ufimsky District
- Time zone: UTC+5:00

Kruchinino (Russian: Кручинино) is a rural locality (a village) in Nikolayevsky Selsoviet, Ufimsky District, Bashkortostan, Russia. The population was 10 as of 2010. There are 5 streets.

== Geography ==
Kruchinino is located 32 km northwest of Ufa (the district's administrative centre) by road. Kolokoltsevo is the nearest rural locality.
