= Yulushevo =

Yulushevo Юлушево
- Village
- Location within Bashkortostan Location within Russia
- Coordinates: 54°55′N 55°31′E
- Country: Russia
- Region: Bashkortostan
- District: Ufimsky District
- Time zone: UTC+5:00

Yulushevo (Russian: Юлушево; Bashkir: Юлыш, Yulış) is a rural locality (a village) in Karmasansky Selsoviet, Ufimsky District, Bashkortostan, Russia. The population was 87 as of 2010. There are 3 streets.

== Geography ==
Yulushevo is located 48 km northwest of Ufa (the district's administrative centre) by road. Karmasan is the nearest rural locality.
