= Kryuchevka =

Kryuchevka Крючевка
- Village
- Location within Bashkortostan Location within Russia
- Coordinates: 54°41′N 56°16′E
- Country: Russia
- Region: Bashkortostan
- District: Ufimsky District
- Time zone: UTC+5:00

Kryuchevka (Russian: Крючевка) is a rural locality (a village) in Russko-Yurmashsky Selsoviet, Ufimsky District, Bashkortostan, Russia. The population was 11 as of 2010. There are 6 streets.

== Geography ==
Kryuchevka is located 30 km southeast of Ufa (the district's administrative centre) by road. Russky Yurmash is the nearest rural locality.
