= Beryozovka, Ufimsky District, Republic of Bashkortostan =

Beryozovka Березовка
- Village
- Location within Bashkortostan Location within Russia
- Coordinates: 54°34′51″N 55°51′19″E
- Country: Russia
- Region: Bashkortostan
- District: Ufimsky District
- Time zone: UTC+5:00

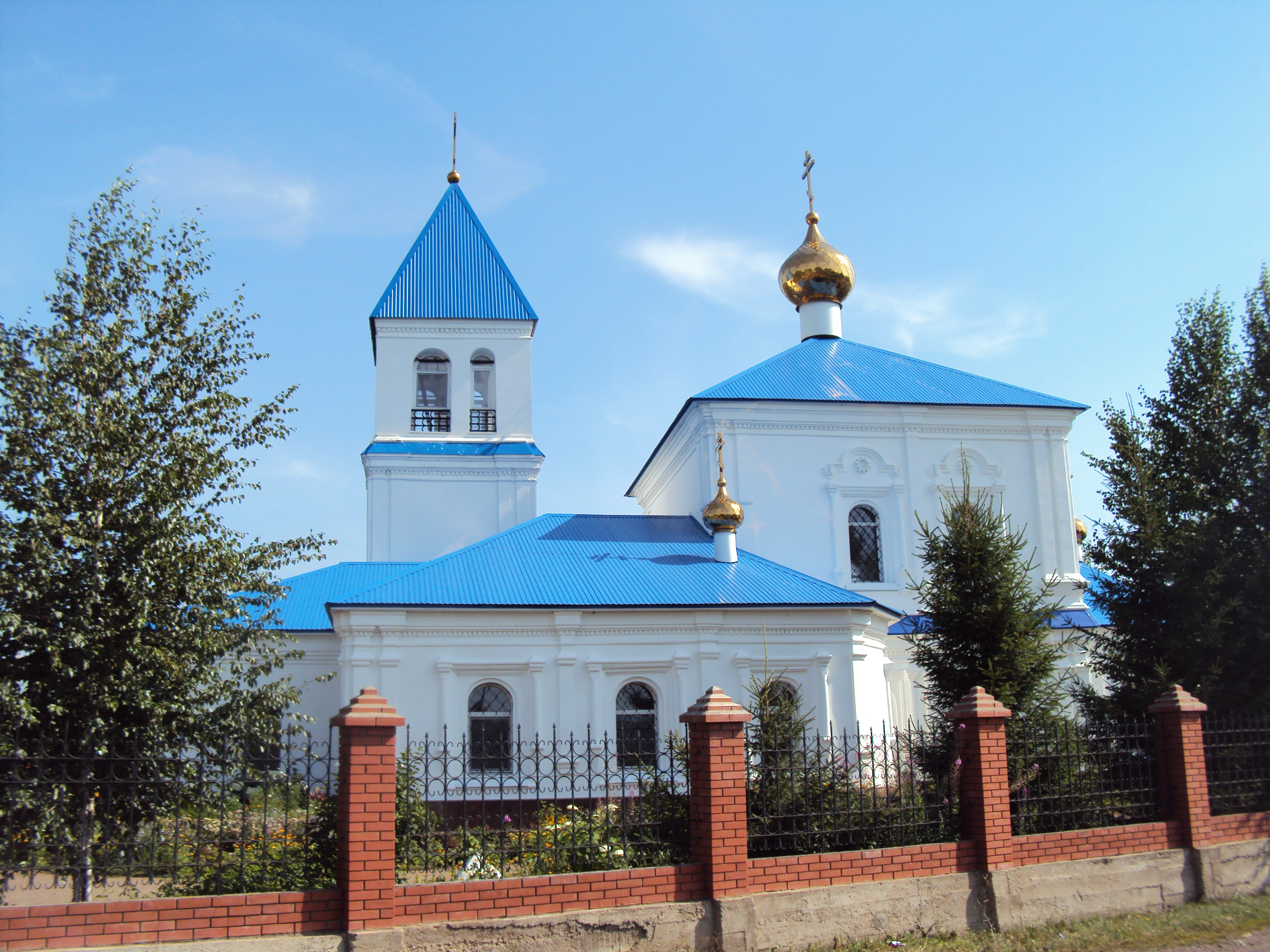
Church of the Nativity of Christ: Berezovka, Ufimsky District, Bashkortostan

Beryozovka (Russian: Березовка) is a rural locality (a village) in Zubovsky Selsoviet, Ufimsky District, Bashkortostan, Russia. The population was 115 as of 2010. There is 1 street.

== Geography ==
Beryozovka is located 22 km southwest of Ufa (the district's administrative centre) by road. Nizhegorodka is the nearest rural locality.
