= Volno-Sukharevo =

Volno-Sukharevo Вольно-Сухарево
- Village
- Location within Bashkortostan Location within Russia
- Coordinates: 54°51′N 55°35′E
- Country: Russia
- Region: Bashkortostan
- District: Ufimsky District
- Time zone: UTC+5:00

Volno-Sukharevo (Russian: Вольно-Сухарево) is a rural locality (a village) in Nikolayevsky Selsoviet, Ufimsky District, Bashkortostan, Russia. The population was 177 as of 2010. There are 2 streets.

== Geography ==
Volno-Sukharevo is located 38 km northwest of Ufa (the district's administrative centre) by road. Nurlino is the nearest rural locality.
