= Chuvarez =

Chuvarez Чуварез
- Village
- Location within Bashkortostan Location within Russia
- Coordinates: 54°57′N 56°14′E
- Country: Russia
- Region: Bashkortostan
- District: Ufimsky District
- Time zone: UTC+5:00

Chuvarez (Russian: Чуварез; Bashkir: Сыбаръяҙ, Sıbaryaź) is a rural locality (a village) in Cherkassky Selsoviet, Ufimsky District, Bashkortostan, Russia. The population was 216 as of 2010. There are 3 streets.

== Geography ==
Chuvarez is located 34 km northeast of Ufa (the district's administrative centre) by road. Kundryak is the nearest rural locality.
