= Cherkasy, Russia =

Cherkasy (Russian: Черкасы) is the name of several rural localities in Russia.

== Modern localities ==
- Cherkasy, Chelyabinsk Oblast, a settlement in Polotsky Selsoviet of Kizilsky District in Chelyabinsk Oblast
- Cherkasy, Republic of Karelia, a village in Medvezhyegorsky District of the Republic of Karelia

== Alternative names ==
- Cherkasy, alternative name of Cherkassy, a selo in Cherkassky Selsoviet of Yeletsky District in Lipetsk Oblast; 52°42′N 38°44′E

== See also ==
- Cherkassy, Russia, several rural localities in Russia
