= Gornovo, Ufimsky District, Republic of Bashkortostan =

Gornovo Горново
- Selo
- Location within Bashkortostan Location within Russia
- Coordinates: 54°53′N 55°52′E
- Country: Russia
- Region: Bashkortostan
- District: Ufimsky District
- Time zone: UTC+5:00

Gornovo (Russian: Горново) is a rural locality (a selo) in Krasnoyarsky Selsoviet, Ufimsky District, Bashkortostan, Russia. The population was 221 as of 2010. There are 7 streets.

== Geography ==
Gornovo is located 27 km north of Ufa (the district's administrative centre) by road. Krasny Yar is the nearest rural locality.
