= Shmidtovo =

Shmidtovo Шмидтово
- Village
- Location within Bashkortostan Location within Russia
- Coordinates: 54°39′N 56°11′E
- Country: Russia
- Region: Bashkortostan
- District: Ufimsky District
- Time zone: UTC+5:00

Shmidtovo (Russian: Шмидтово) is a rural locality (a village) in Russko-Yurmashsky Selsoviet, Ufimsky District, Bashkortostan, Russia. The population was 406 as of 2010. There are 76 streets.

== Geography ==
Shmidtovo is located 23 km southeast of Ufa (the district's administrative centre) by road. Yuzhnaya is the nearest rural locality.
