= Derevnya Geofizikov =

Derevnya Geofizikov Деревня Геофизиков
- Village
- Location within Bashkortostan Location within Russia
- Coordinates: 54°34′N 55°54′E
- Country: Russia
- Region: Bashkortostan
- District: Ufimsky District
- Time zone: UTC+5:00

Derevnya Geofizikov (Russian: Деревня Геофизиков) is a rural locality (a village) in Chesnokovsky Selsoviet, Ufimsky District, Bashkortostan, Russia. The population was 509 as of 2010. There are 5 streets.

== Geography ==
Derevnya Geofizikov is located 19 km south of Ufa (the district's administrative centre) by road. Torfyanoy is the nearest rural locality.
