= Mudarisovo =

Mudarisovo Мударисово
- Village
- Location within Bashkortostan Location within Russia
- Coordinates: 54°50′N 55°49′E
- Country: Russia
- Region: Bashkortostan
- District: Ufimsky District
- Time zone: UTC+5:00

Mudarisovo (Russian: Мударисово; Bashkir: Мөҙәрис, Möźäris) is a rural locality (a village) in Mikhaylovsky Selsoviet, Ufimsky District, Bashkortostan, Russia. The population was 198 as of 2010. There are 14 streets.

== Geography ==
Mudarisovo is located 19 km northwest of Ufa (the district's administrative centre) by road. Chernolesovsky is the nearest rural locality.
