= Zagorsky, Republic of Bashkortostan =

Zagorsky Загорский
- Village
- Location within Bashkortostan Location within Russia
- Coordinates: 54°35′N 55°57′E
- Country: Russia
- Region: Bashkortostan
- District: Ufimsky District
- Time zone: UTC+5:00

Zagorsky (Russian: Загорский) is a rural locality (a village) in Chesnokovsky Selsoviet, Ufimsky District, Bashkortostan, Russia. The population was 272 as of 2010. There are 5 streets.

== Geography ==
Zagorsky is located 19 km south of Ufa (the district's administrative centre) by road. Chesnokovka is the nearest rural locality.
