= Debovka =

Debovka Дебовка
- Village
- Location within Bashkortostan Location within Russia
- Coordinates: 54°32′N 55°44′E
- Country: Russia
- Region: Bashkortostan
- District: Ufimsky District
- Time zone: UTC+5:00

Debovka (Russian: Дебовка) is a rural locality (a village) in Taptykovsky Selsoviet, Ufimsky District, Bashkortostan, Russia. The population was 49 as of 2010. There is 1 street.

== Geography ==
Debovka is located 32 km southwest of Ufa (the district's administrative centre) by road. Osorgino is the nearest rural locality.
