= Dubrava, Republic of Bashkortostan =

Dubrava Дубрава
- Village
- Location within Bashkortostan Location within Russia
- Coordinates: 54°34′N 55°43′E
- Country: Russia
- Region: Bashkortostan
- District: Ufimsky District
- Time zone: UTC+5:00

Dubrava (Russian: Дубрава) is a rural locality (a village) in Taptykovsky Selsoviet, Ufimsky District, Bashkortostan, Russia. The population was 180 as of 2010. There is 1 street.

== Geography ==
Dubrava is located 29 km southwest of Ufa (the district's administrative centre) by road. Lekarevka is the nearest rural locality.
