= Kundryak, Ufimsky District, Republic of Bashkortostan =

Kundryak Кундряк
- Village
- Location within Bashkortostan Location within Russia
- Coordinates: 54°57′N 56°15′E
- Country: Russia
- Region: Bashkortostan
- District: Ufimsky District
- Time zone: UTC+5:00

Kundryak (Russian: Кундряк; Bashkir: Күндерәк, Künderäk) is a rural locality (a village) in Cherkassky Selsoviet, Ufimsky District, Bashkortostan, Russia. The population was 2 as of 2010. There is 1 street.

== Geography ==
Kundryak is located 36 km northeast of Ufa (the district's administrative centre) by road. Chuvarez is the nearest rural locality.
