= Yumatovo =

Yumatovo Юматово
- Village
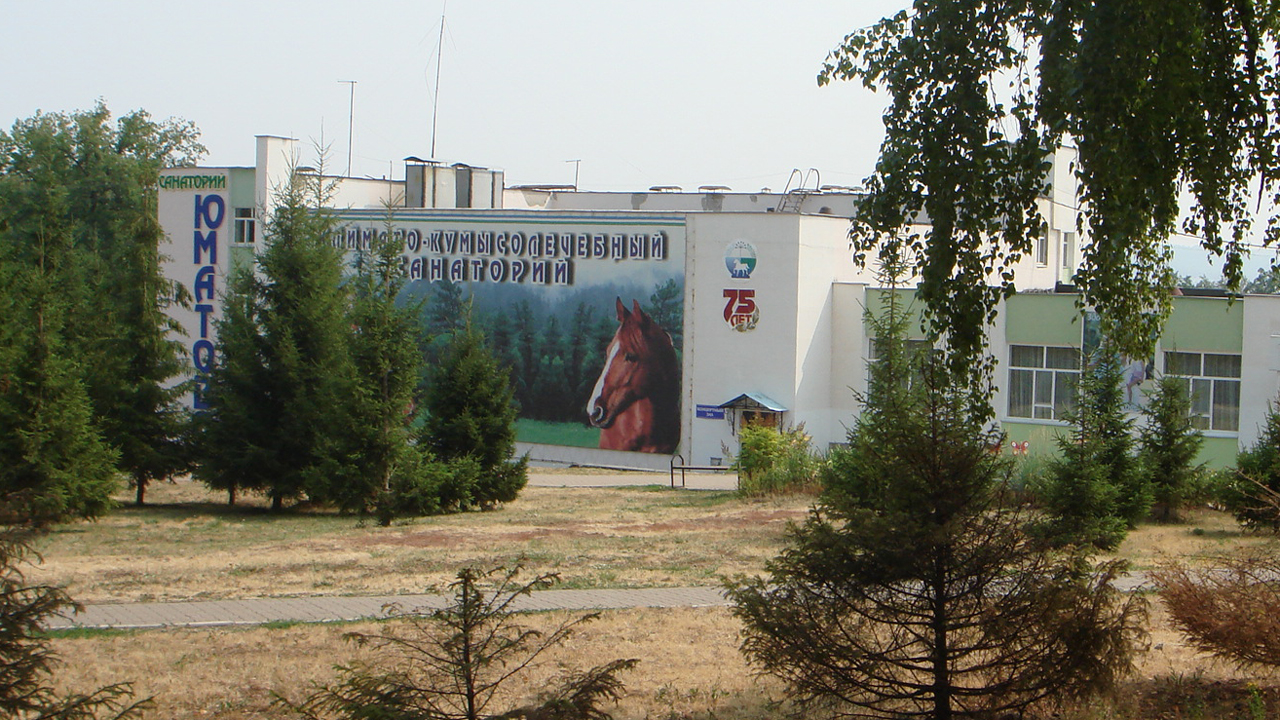
- Yumatovo recreation center

- Location within Bashkortostan Location within Russia
- Coordinates: 54°37′N 55°39′E
- Country: Russia
- Region: Bashkortostan
- District: Ufimsky District
- Time zone: UTC+5:00

Yumatovo (Russian: Юматово; Bashkir: Йоматау, Yomataw) is a rural locality (a village) in Yumatovsky Selsoviet, Ufimsky District, Bashkortostan, Russia. The population was 1,598 as of 2010. There are 37 streets.

== Geography ==
Yumatovo is located 39 km southwest of Ufa (the district's administrative centre) by road. Sanatoriya Yumatova imeni 15-letiya BASSR is the nearest rural locality.
