= Peschany, Ufimsky District, Republic of Bashkortostan =

Peschany Песчаный
- Village
- Location within Bashkortostan Location within Russia
- Coordinates: 54°32′N 55°52′E
- Country: Russia
- Region: Bashkortostan
- District: Ufimsky District
- Time zone: UTC+5:00

Peschany (Russian: Песчаный) is a rural locality (a village) in Bulgakovsky Selsoviet, Ufimsky District, Bashkortostan, Russia. The population was 181 as of 2010. There is 1 street.

== Geography ==
Peschany is located 34 km south of Ufa (the district's administrative centre) by road. Stukolkino is the nearest rural locality.
