= Amzya, Neftekamsk, Republic of Bashkortostan =

Amzya Амзя
- Selo
- Location within Bashkortostan Location within Russia
- Coordinates: 56°13′N 54°23′E
- Country: Russia
- Region: Bashkortostan
- District: Neftekamsk
- Time zone: UTC+5:00

Amzya (Russian: Амзя; Bashkir: Əмзə, Ämzä) is a rural locality (a selo) in Neftekamsk, Bashkortostan, Russia. The population was 4,993 as of 2010. There are 67 streets.

== Geography ==
Amzya is located 22 km northeast of Neftekamsk. Kumovo is the nearest rural locality.
