= Mysovtsevo =

Mysovtsevo Мысовцево
- Village
- Location within Bashkortostan Location within Russia
- Coordinates: 54°38′N 55°44′E
- Country: Russia
- Region: Bashkortostan
- District: Ufimsky District
- Time zone: UTC+5:00

Mysovtsevo (Russian: Мысовцево) is a rural locality (a village) in Zhukovsky Selsoviet, Ufimsky District, Bashkortostan, Russia. The population was 259 as of 2010. There are 2 streets.

== Geography ==
Mysovtsevo is located 32 km southwest of Ufa (the district's administrative centre) by road. Zhukovo is the nearest rural locality.
