= Vavilovo =

Vavilovo may refer to:

- Vavilovo, Bashkortostan
- Vavilovo, Kaliningrad Oblast
- Vavilovo, Republic of Dagestan
