= Tashkinovo =

Tashkinovo Ташкиново
- Selo
- Location within Bashkortostan Location within Russia
- Coordinates: 56°02′N 54°16′E
- Country: Russia
- Region: Bashkortostan
- District: Neftekamsk
- Time zone: UTC+5:00

Tashkinovo (Russian: Ташкиново; Bashkir: Ташкинов, Taşkinov) is a rural locality (a selo) in Neftekamsk, Bashkortostan, Russia. The population was 2,467 as of 2010. There are 44 streets.

== Geography ==
Tashkinovo is located 6 km south of Neftekamsk. Neftekamsk is the nearest rural locality.
