= Kamyshly, Ufimsky District, Republic of Bashkortostan =

Kamyshly Камышлы
- Village
- Location within Bashkortostan Location within Russia
- Coordinates: 54°31′N 55°56′E
- Country: Russia
- Region: Bashkortostan
- District: Ufimsky District
- Time zone: UTC+5:00

Kamyshly (Russian: Камышлы; Bashkir: Ҡамышлы, Qamışlı) is a rural locality (a village) in Bulgakovsky Selsoviet, Ufimsky District, Bashkortostan, Russia. The population was 758 as of 2010. There are 11 streets.

== Geography ==
Kamyshly is located 32 km south of Ufa (the district's administrative centre) by road. Polyany is the nearest rural locality.
