= Dubki, Republic of Bashkortostan =

Dubki Дубки
- Village
- Location within Bashkortostan Location within Russia
- Coordinates: 54°28′N 55°55′E
- Country: Russia
- Region: Bashkortostan
- District: Ufimsky District
- Time zone: UTC+5:00

Dubki (Russian: Дубки) is a rural locality (a village) in Bulgakovsky Selsoviet, Ufimsky District, Bashkortostan, Russia. The population was 219 as of 2010. There are 9 streets.

== Geography ==
Dubki is located 32 km south of Ufa (the district's administrative centre) by road. Bulgakovo is the nearest rural locality.
