= Nurlino =

Nurlino Нурлино
- Selo
- Location within Bashkortostan Location within Russia
- Coordinates: 54°48′N 55°34′E
- Country: Russia
- Region: Bashkortostan
- District: Ufimsky District
- Time zone: UTC+5:00

Nurlino (Russian: Нурлино; Bashkir: Нөрлө, Nörlö) is a rural locality (a selo) in Nikolayevsky Selsoviet, Ufimsky District, Bashkortostan, Russia. The population was 1,892 as of 2010. There are 32 streets.

== Geography ==
Nurlino is located 34 km northwest of Ufa (the district's administrative centre) by road. Nikolayevka is the nearest rural locality.
