= Selo Yumatovskogo Selkhoztekhnikuma =

Selo Yumatovskogo Selkhoztekhnikuma Село Юматовского Сельхозтехникума
- Selo
- Location within Bashkortostan Location within Russia
- Coordinates: 54°36′N 55°37′E
- Country: Russia
- Region: Bashkortostan
- District: Ufimsky District
- Time zone: UTC+5:00

Selo Yumatovskogo Selkhoztekhnikuma (Russian: Село Юматовского Сельхозтехникума; Bashkir: Йоматау сельхозтехникумы, Yomataw selxoztexnikumı) is a rural locality (a selo) in Yumatovsky Selsoviet, Ufimsky District, Bashkortostan, Russia. The population was 355 as of 2010. There are 7 streets.

== Geography ==
Selo is located 38 km southwest of Ufa (the district's administrative centre) by road. Sanatoriya Yumatovo imeni 15-letiya BASSR is the nearest rural locality.
