= OKT =

OKT may refer to:

- Oktyabrsky Airport, the IATA code OKT
- Oklahoma, Kansas and Texas Railroad, a railway line in the United States of America
- Országos Kéktúra, a national trail in Hungary
