= Mardanshin =

Mardanshin (masculine), or Mardanshinа (feminine) is a Tatar surname. Notable people with the surname include:

- Rafael Mardanshin (born 1961), Russian politician
- Rinat Mardanshin (1963–2005), Russian motorcycle speedway rider
