= Lekarevka =

Lekarevka Лекаревка
- Village
- Location within Bashkortostan Location within Russia
- Coordinates: 54°35′N 55°42′E
- Country: Russia
- Region: Bashkortostan
- District: Ufimsky District
- Time zone: UTC+5:00

Lekarevka (Russian: Лекаревка) is a rural locality (a village) in Taptykovsky Selsoviet, Ufimsky District, Bashkortostan, Russia. The population was 146 as of 2010. There are 17 streets.

== Geography ==
Lekarevka is located 31 km southwest of Ufa (the district's administrative centre) by road. Glumilino is the nearest rural locality.
