= Neftekamsk Urban Okrug =

- District
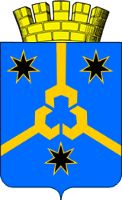
- Flag Coat of arms
- Country: Russia
- Administrative center: Neftekamsk

Area
  - Total: 147.25 km^{2} (56.85 sq mi)

Population
  - Estimate (2018): 139,263
- Time zone: UTC+5 (MSK+2)
- OKTMO ID: 80727000

Neftekamsk Urban Okrug is an urban okrug in Republic of Bashkortostan, Russia. The administrative center is Neftekamsk.
