= Marino, Neftekamsk, Republic of Bashkortostan =

Marino Марино
- Village
- Location within Bashkortostan Location within Russia
- Coordinates: 56°04′N 54°14′E
- Country: Russia
- Region: Bashkortostan
- District: Neftekamsk
- Time zone: UTC+5:00

Marino (Russian: Марино; Bashkir: Марин Marin) is a rural locality (a village) in Neftekamsk, Bashkortostan, Russia. The population was 471 as of 2010. There are 15 streets.

== Geography ==
Marino is located 2 km south of Neftekamsk. Neftekamsk is the nearest rural locality.
