= Pavlovka Hydroelectric Station =

Pavlovka Dam
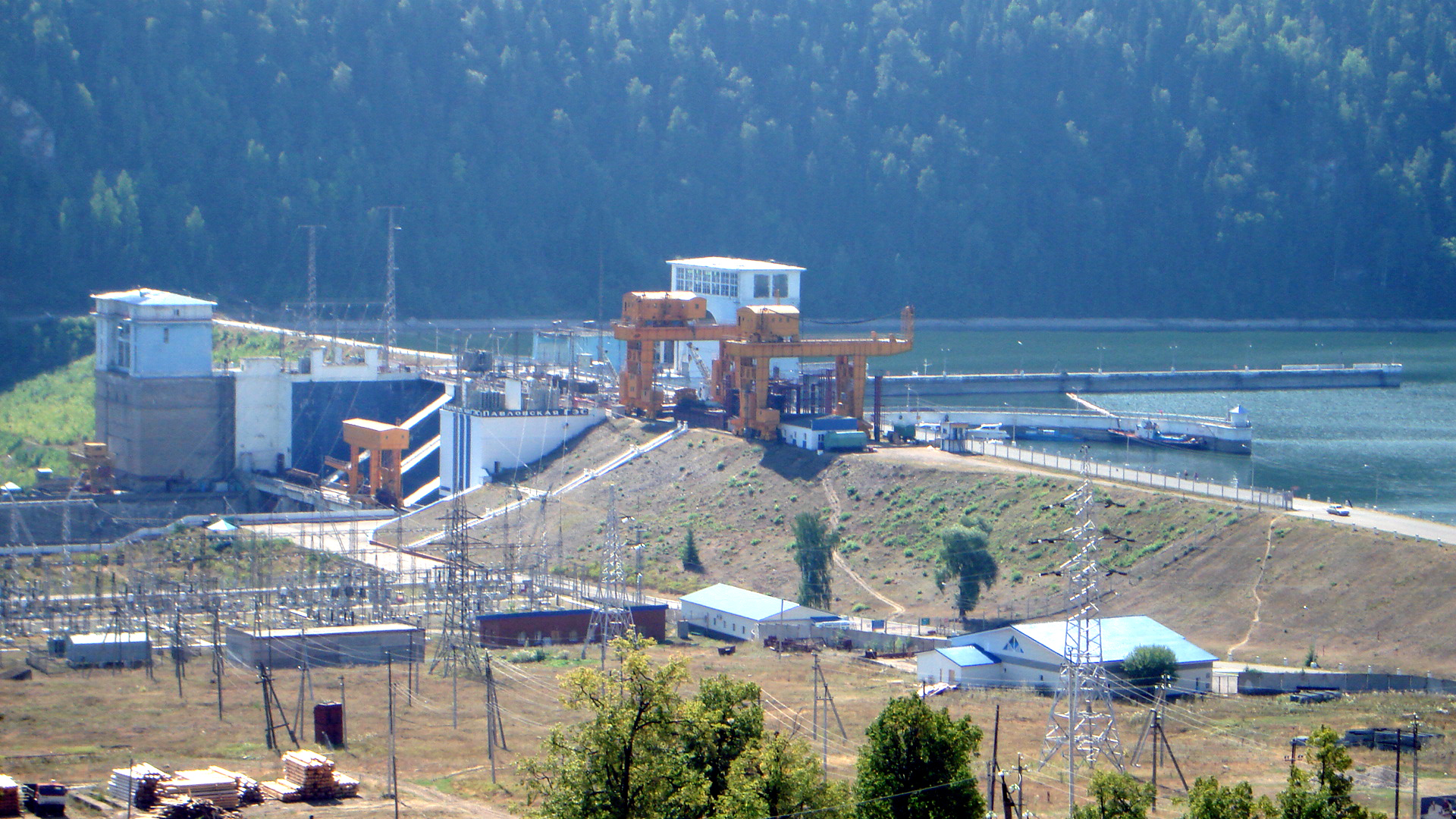

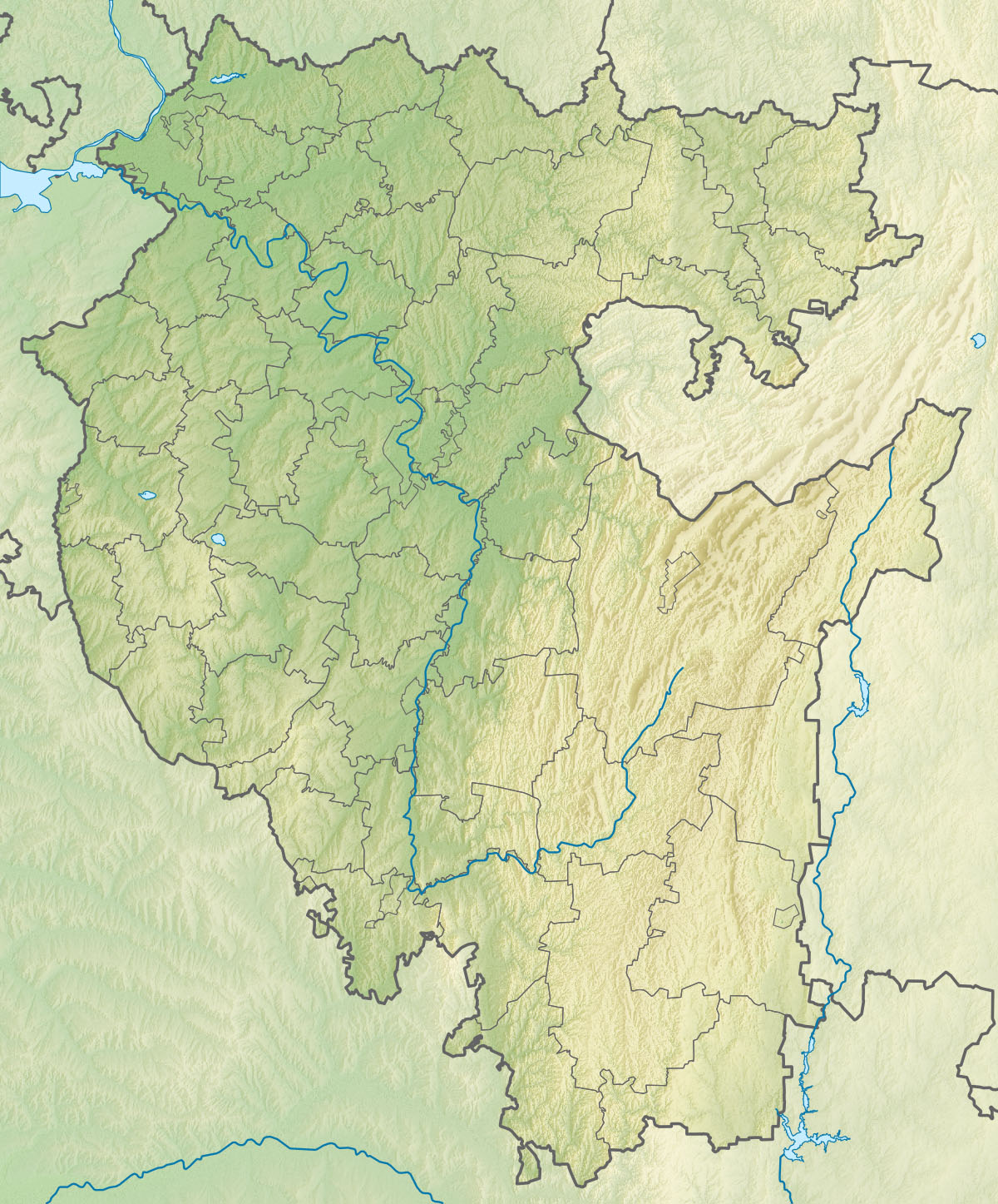
- Location within Bashkortostan Location within Russia
- Official name: Павловская ГЭС
- Location: Pavlovka, Bashkortostan, Russia
- Coordinates: 55°25′4″N 56°32′1″E
- Construction began: 1950
- Opening date: 1960
- Owner: Bashkirenergo

Dam and spillways
- Height: 41.3 m (135 ft)

Reservoir
- Creates: Pavlovka Reservoir
- Total capacity: 1.41 km^{3} (0.34 cu mi)
- Surface area: 116 km^{2} (45 sq mi)

Power Station
- Operator: Bashkirenergo
- Turbines: 4 x 50.4 MW
- Installed capacity: 201.6 MW
- Annual generation: 590 GWh

Pavlovka hydroelectric station (Russian: Павловская гидроэлектростанция) is a power station located near the village Pavlovka on the Ufa River in Bashkortostan, Russia. Construction of the power station began in 1950 and was completed in 1960. The power station is owned and operated by Bashkirenergo.

== Description ==
The power station consists of:

- Concrete spillway dam, combined with the building of hydroelectric power station, a maximum height of 41.3 metres (135 ft);
- The left-bank dam bulk (loam and gravelisto-pebble soils), maximum height of 20 metres (66 ft);
- Alluvial river bed (with kernel) dam, the maximum height of 43 metres (141 ft);
- Single-chamber navigation lock - spillway;
- Offtake

The power station has a capacity of 166.4 MW and the average annual generation of electricity is 590 GWh. It has four Kaplan turbines with capacity of 41.6 MW each. Turbines are manufactured by Kharkov Turboatom and generators are manufactured by the St. Petersburg plant Electrosila.

The dam creates the Pavlovka Reservoir with area of 116 square kilometres (45 sq mi) and volume of 1.41 cubic kilometres (1,140,000 acre⋅ft) (total) and 0.9 cubic kilometres (730,000 acre⋅ft) (useful).

== Modernization ==
The power station is in the process of modernization. As a result, the capacity of each turbine will increase to 50.4 MW, leading to the overall capacity of 201.6 MW.
