= Dorogino, Ufimsky District, Republic of Bashkortostan =

Dorogino Дорогино
- Village
- Location within Bashkortostan Location within Russia
- Coordinates: 54°47′N 56°16′E
- Country: Russia
- Region: Bashkortostan
- District: Ufimsky District
- Time zone: UTC+5:00

Dorogino (Russian: Дорогино) is a rural locality (a village) in Kirillovsky Selsoviet, Ufimsky District, Bashkortostan, Russia. The population was 225 as of 2010. There are 26 streets.

== Geography ==
Dorogino is located 27 km northeast of Ufa (the district's administrative centre) by road. Knyazevo is the nearest rural locality.
