= Mishkinsky District =

Location of the Republic of Bashkortostan in Russia

Location of Kurgan Oblast in Russia

Mishkinsky District is the name of several administrative and municipal districts in Russia:

- Mishkinsky District, Republic of Bashkortostan, an administrative and municipal district of the Republic of Bashkortostan
- Mishkinsky District, Kurgan Oblast, an administrative and municipal district of Kurgan Oblast

== See also ==
- Mishkinsky
