= Vavilovo, Bashkortostan =

Vavilovo Вавилово
- Village
- Location within Bashkortostan Location within Russia
- Coordinates: 54°48′N 55°51′E
- Country: Russia
- Region: Bashkortostan
- District: Ufimsky District
- Time zone: UTC+5:00

Vavilovo (Russian: Вавилово) is a rural locality (a village) in Mikhaylovsky Selsoviet, Ufimsky District, Bashkortostan, Russia. The population was 231 as of 2010. There are 10 streets.

== Geography ==
Vavilovo is located 14 km northwest of Ufa (the district's administrative centre) by road. Mikhaylovka is the nearest rural locality.
