= Milovka =

Milovka Миловка
- Selo
- Location within Bashkortostan Location within Russia
- Coordinates: 54°46′N 55°49′E
- Country: Russia
- Region: Bashkortostan
- District: Ufimsky District
- Time zone: UTC+5:00

Milovka (Russian: Миловка) is a rural locality (a selo) and the administrative centre of Milovsky Selsoviet, Ufimsky District, Bashkortostan, Russia. The population was 2,767 as of 2010. There are 68 streets.

== Geography ==
Milovka is located 16 km northwest of Ufa (the district's administrative centre) by road. Zaton is the nearest rural locality.
