= Neftekamsk Airport =

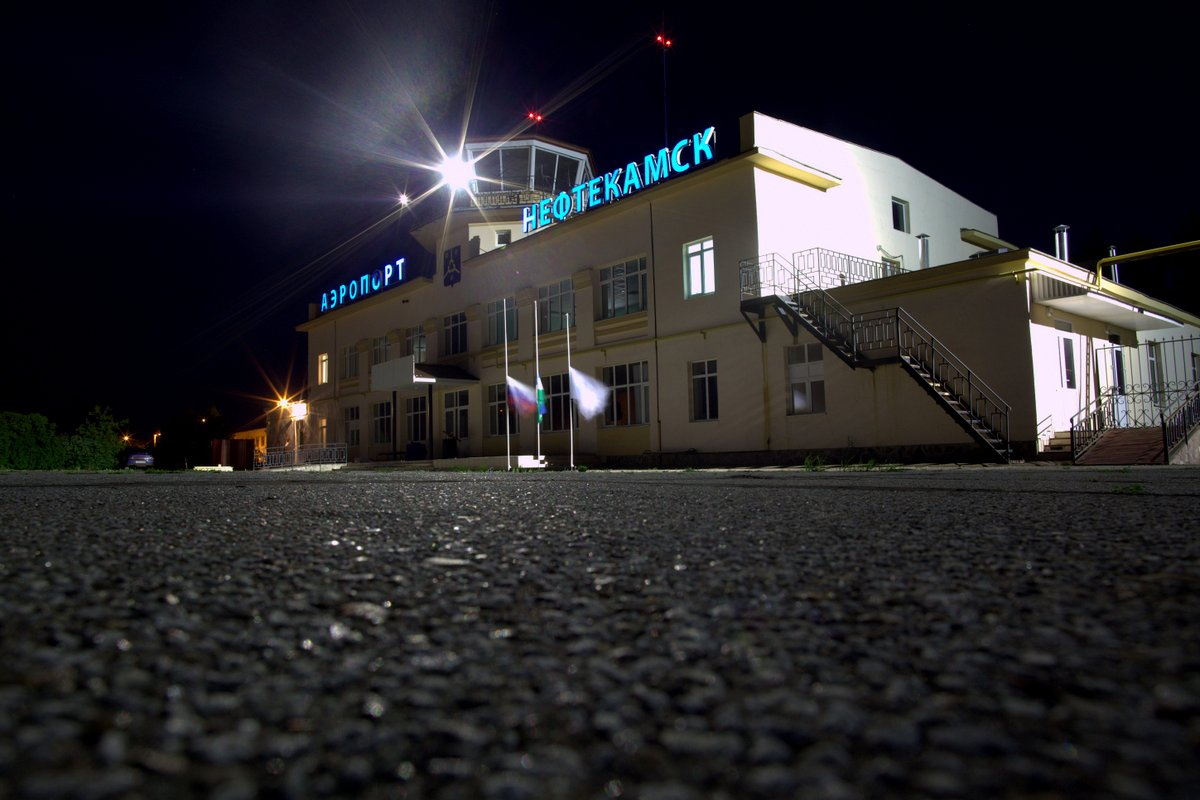
- IATA: NEF; ICAO: UWUF

Summary
- Airport type: Public
- Location: Neftekamsk
- Elevation AMSL: 456 ft / 139 m
- Coordinates: 56°6′36″N 54°20′54″E
- Interactive map of Neftekamsk Airport

Runways
Direction	Length		Surface
Direction	ft	m	Surface
~~18/36~~	~~6,168~~	~~1,880~~	~~Asphalt~~
(18/36)	4,593	1,400	Grass

Neftekamsk Airport (Bashkir: Нефтекама Аэропорты, Russian: Аэропорт Нефтекамск) (IATA: NEF, ICAO: UWUF) is an airport in Bashkortostan, Russia located 6 km northeast of Neftekamsk. It is a minor airfield.

As of 2024, the airport is unlisted in the register of operational airfields of Federal Air Transport Agency of Russia.

== See also ==
- List of airports in Russia
