= Karmasan =

Karmasan Кармасан
- Selo
- Location within Bashkortostan Location within Russia
- Coordinates: 54°54′N 55°29′E
- Country: Russia
- Region: Bashkortostan
- District: Ufimsky District
- Time zone: UTC+5:00

Karmasan (Russian: Кармасан; Bashkir: Ҡармасан, Qarmasan) is a rural locality (a selo) and the administrative centre of Karmasansky Selsoviet, Ufimsky District, Bashkortostan, Russia. The population was 706 as of 2010.

== Geography ==
Karmasan is located 51 km northwest of Ufa (the district's administrative centre) by road. Asanovo is the nearest rural locality.
