= Rafael Mardanshin =

Russian politician

- Рафаэль Марданшин
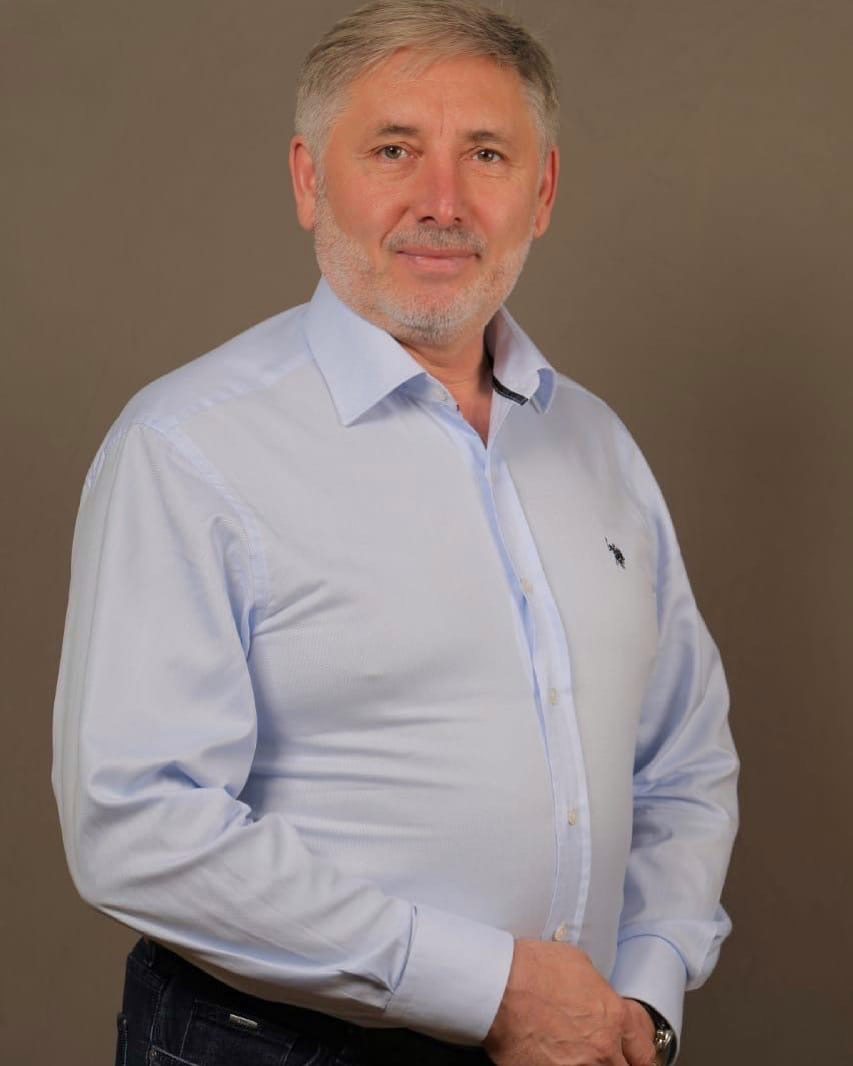

Member of the State Duma for Bashkortostan
- In office 12 October 2021 – 30 September 2026
- Preceded by: Ildar Bikbayev
- Succeeded by: Yulai Kidrasov
- Constituency: Blagoveshchensk (No. 4)

Member of the State Duma (Party List Seat)
- In office 21 December 2011 – 12 October 2021

Personal details
- Born: 24 December 1961 (age 64) Oktyabrsky, Bashkir Autonomous Soviet Socialist Republic, RSFSR, USSR
- Party: United Russia
- Education: Ufa State Petroleum Technological University

Rafael Mirkhatimovich Mardanshin (Russian: Рафаэль Мирхатимович Марданшин; born 24 December 1961) is a Russian politician who was a deputy of the 7th and 8th State Dumas.

== Biography ==
Rafael Mardanshin was born on December 24, 1961, in Oktyabrsky in the Bashkir ASSR (now the Republic of Bashkortostan).

In 1989 he graduated from the Ufa Petroleum Institute. In 2002 he graduated from the Bashkir Academy of Civil Service, in 2015 – the Russian Academy of National Economy and Civil Service.

== Career ==
From 1998 to 2003 Mardanshin was the chairman of the Union of Entrepreneurs of Oktyabrsky.

From 1999 to 2003 he was also a deputy of the Oktyabrsky City Council.

In 2000 he became a member of the Council and the Presidium of the Association of Business Organizations of the Republic of Bashkortostan.

In 2003-2008 he was a deputy of the State Assembly of the Republic of Bashkortostan of the 3rd convocation.

In 2011 Mardanshin was appointed as a member of the council under the head of the Republic of Bashkortostan for combating corruption and the public council under the Head of the Republic of Bashkortostan for improving the investment climate within Baskhortostan.

In the same year he was elected as a deputy of the 6th State Duma (until 2016).

In 2016-2021 he was a deputy of the 7th State Duma.

Since 2016 Mardanshin has been a member of the Central Control Commission of United Russia.

From 2021 he is a deputy of the 8th State Duma.

== Personal life ==
As of 2016 he was married and had son and daughter.

== Sanctions ==
He was sanctioned by the UK government in 2022 in relation to the Russo-Ukrainian War. He also received sanctions from Canada, the United States, the European Union, Monaco, Switzerland, Australia and Japan.
