= Ufimsky (rural locality) =

Ufimsky (Russian: Уфимский; masculine), Ufimskaya (Уфимская; feminine), or Ufimskoye (Уфимское; neuter) is the name of several rural localities in Russia:

- Ufimsky, Republic of Bashkortostan, a rural locality (a selo) in the Republic of Bashkortostan
- Ufimsky, Sverdlovsk Oblast, a former urban-type settlement in Sverdlovsk Oblast, since 2004—a rural locality (a settlement)
