= Birsk State Pedagogical Institute =

Higher education institution

- Бирский государственный педагогический институт
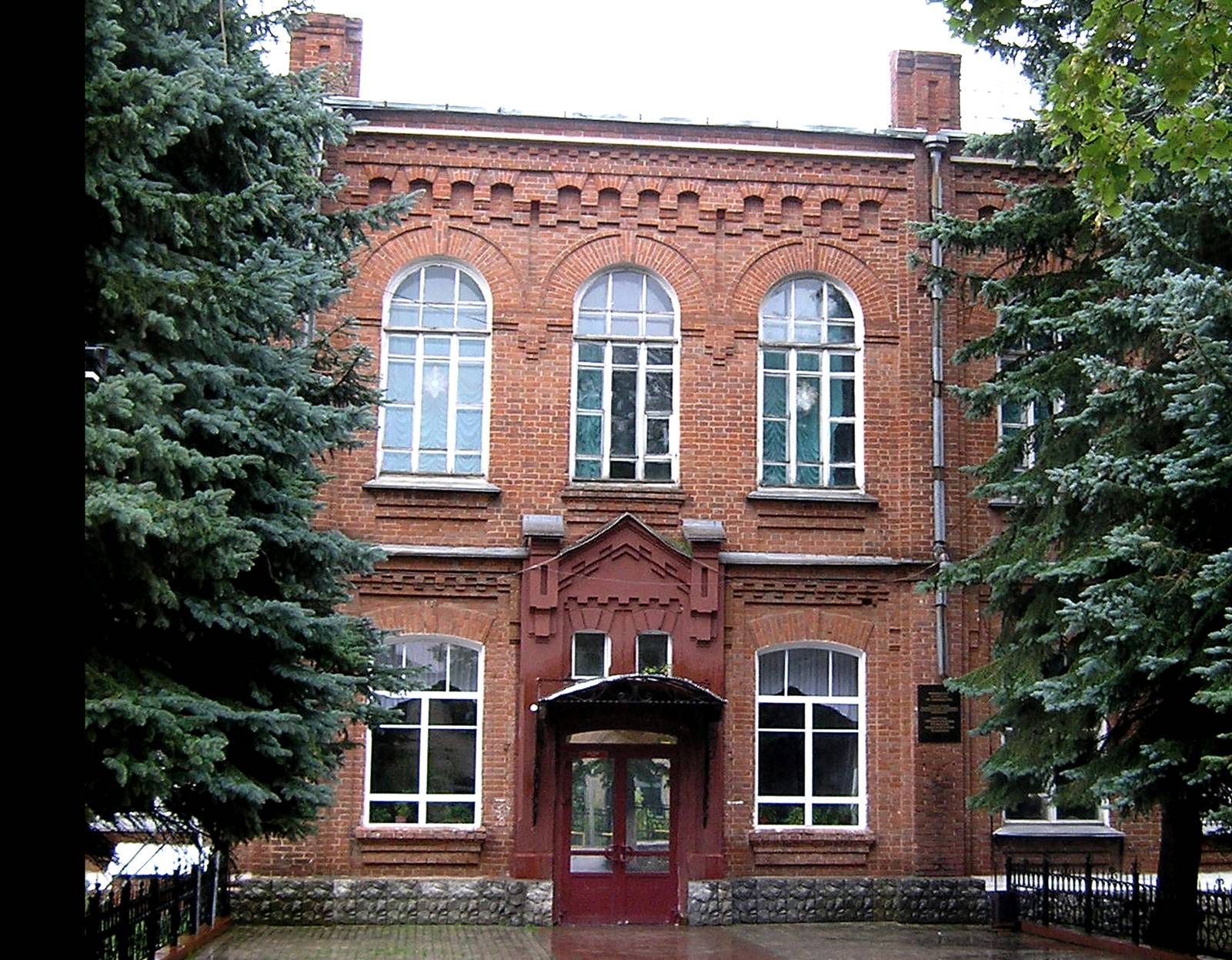
- Established: 1939
- Location: Birsk, Bashkortostan, Russia
- Language: Russian

Birsk State Pedagogical Institute (Russian: Бирский государственный педагогический институт) is a higher education institution founded on 27 June 1939 to train teaching staff. Reorganized on 9 February 2012 by joining Bashkir State University as a branch.

== History ==
In 1862, a pedagogical class was opened as part of the Birsk district school, which became the first pedagogical educational institution in Bashkiria, which existed until 1870. On 3 October 1882, by order of the State Council, the Birsk Foreign Teachers' School was established, which existed until 1918 to train teachers of foreign schools and has produced over three hundred teachers throughout its existence. Since 1918, the Birsk foreign teacher's school was transformed into the Birsk Mari teacher's seminary, and in 1919 into the Birsk Mari pedagogical courses. In 1921, the Birsk Mari Pedagogical Courses were renamed into the Birsk Pedagogical College, during the existence of the college, more than eight hundred and seventy teachers graduated from its walls.

On 27 June 1939, by the Decree of the Council of People's Commissars of the RSFSR No. 318, the Birsk Teachers' Institute was established on the basis of the Birsk Bashkir Pedagogical School to train teachers of a comprehensive school. P. M. Chugunkin was appointed the first rector. The term of study at the institute was two years. Three educational departments were created in the structure of the institute: Russian language and literature, physics and mathematics and history, and five departments: physics and mathematics, Russian language and literature, history, pedagogy and Marxism–Leninism. The first teaching staff consisted of nineteen teachers. In 1939, two hundred and ninety students were enrolled in full-time education. In 1940, a correspondence department was established. In 1941, the institute graduated the first sixty-four specialist teachers, of which: twenty-six teachers of the Russian language and literature and thirty-eight teachers of history, physics and mathematics.

On 27 September 1941, by Order of the People's Commissariat for Education of the RSFSR No. N-300, on the basis of the Birsk Teachers' Institute and the Oryol Pedagogical Institute, the Birsk State Pedagogical Institute was established with the preservation of the teacher's institute at the established Birsk Pedagogical Institute. In the structure of the main institute, courses of foreign languages and military physical education were created, as well as three faculties: geographical, physical and mathematical and natural sciences, four departments remained in the structure of the teacher's institute: philological, historical, natural geographical and physical and mathematical. The term of study at the main institute was four years, at the teacher's institute - two years. In 1942, during the Great Patriotic War, the second graduation of eighteen people took place at the institute, including: seven teachers of Russian language and literature, six teachers of mathematics and physics, and five teachers of history. In 1945, a preparatory department was created at the institute. From 1941 to 1948, the institute trained more than seven hundred and seventeen teachers of general education schools in various specializations.

In 2005, by the Decree of the Government of the Russian Federation, the Birsk State Pedagogical Institute was renamed into the Birsk State Social and Pedagogical Academy. On 9 February 2012, by order of the Ministry of Education and Science of the Russian Federation No. 95, the Birsk State Social and Pedagogical Academy was reorganized and became part of the Bashkir State University as a branch. Seven faculties were created in the structure of the institute: physics and mathematics, biology and chemistry, domestic philology and foreign languages, childhood pedagogy, social and humanitarian, physical culture and technological and art education. The staff of the institute consists of more than two and a half thousand students and two hundred and seventy-six teachers. Over the entire period of activity, the institute has trained more than sixty thousand specialists.

== Management ==
- P. M. Chugunkin (1939-1941)
- A. A. Ovchinnikov (1941-1943)
- G. G. Neizvestnykh (1950—1954)
- G. N. Fatikhov (1954-1956, 1960–1962)
- I. A. Zotov (1956-1958)
- M. B. Murtazin (1958-1961)
- F. V. Sultanov (1961-1963)
- K. Sh. Akhiyarov (1963-1989)
- M. I. Garipov (1989-1995)
- S. M. Usmanov (since 1995)

== Notable faculty and alumni ==
- Gayazov, Alfis Sufiyanovich - Doctor of Pedagogical Sciences, Professor, Corresponding Member of the Russian Academy of Education
- Kamaev, Rashit Burkhanovich - Doctor of Philosophy, Professor, Honored Scientist of the Republic of Bashkortostan
- Aminev, Ziya Askatovich - Doctor of Historical Sciences, Professor

== Литература ==
- Башкирская энциклопедия : [ 7 т.] / гл . ред. М.А. Ильгамов. - Уфа : Башк. энцикл., Т. 1: А-Б. - 2005. — 623 с. — ISBN 5-88185-053-X
- Они работали и учились в Бирском педагогическом: Сборник материалов, посвященных 80-летию образования Бирского филиала / ФГБОУ ВО «Башкирский государственный университет». Бирск: Бирский филиал БашГУ, 2019. — 194 с.

== Sources ==
- "оф.сайт".
- "Бирский филиал БГУ". Исторический Бирск.
- "Бирский государственный педагогический институт". Бирский исторический музей.
- "Бирский филиал". Bashkir State University. Archived from the original on 2022-02-10.
