= Mikhaylovka, Ufimsky District, Bashkortostan =

Coordinates: 54.8090°N 55.8900°E

Milkaylovka (Russian: Михайловка, Bashkir: Михайловка) — is a village in the Ufimsky district of Bashkortostan, and the administrative centre of the Mikhaylovskii village council (Russian: сельсовет, romanized: sel'sovet) rural settlement.

== Population ==
According to the 2021 Russian census, the main ethnicities present in the village are Russians (29.8%), Bashkirs (24.6%) and Tatars (18.7%), with 24.4% having undeclared ethnicity.

== Geography ==
Mikhaylovka is 12 km (7.46 miles) away from the district administrative centre and closest train station in Ufa.

== Notable residents ==
- Alexey Alymov, a Hero of the Soviet Union, was the principal and a teacher in the Mikhaylovka High School.
- The Russian biathlonist and three-time world champion Maxim Tchoudov was born in Mikhaylovka.
