= Nikolayevka, Ufimsky District, Republic of Bashkortostan =

Coordinates: 54°49′15″N 55°41′48″E

Nikolayevka (Russian: Никола́евка) is a village in Ufimsky District of the Republic of Bashkortostan, Russia. Its postal code is 450532.
