= Alexeyevka, Ufimsky District, Republic of Bashkortostan =

Alekseevka Алексеевка
- Village
- Location within Bashkortostan Location within Russia
- Coordinates: 54°50′N 56°00′E
- Country: Russia
- Region: Bashkortostan
- District: Ufimsky District
- Time zone: UTC+5:00

Alekseevka (Russian: Алексеевка) is a rural locality (a village) and the administrative centre of Alekseevka Selsoviet, Ufimsky District, Bashkortostan, Russia. The population was 4,611 as of 2010. There are 34 streets.

== Geography ==
Alexeyevka is located 15 km north of Ufa (the district's administrative centre) by road. Tarbeyevka is the nearest rural locality.
