= Oktyabrsky Airport =

Oktyabrsky Airport Аэропорт Октябрьский
- IATA: OKT; ICAO: UWUK

Summary
- Airport type: Public
- Serves: Oktyabrsky, Republic of Bashkortostan, Russia
- Elevation AMSL: 377 ft / 115 m
- Coordinates: 54°26′24″N 53°23′18″E

Map
- Location of airport in Tatarstan, Russia

Runways
Direction	Length		Surface
Direction	m	ft	Surface
18/36	1,500	4,921	Asphalt

Oktyabrsky Airport (Russian: Аэропорт Октябрьский) (IATA: OKT, ICAO: UWUK) is an airport located in the Republic of Tatarstan serving the city of Oktyabrsky in the Republic of Bashkortostan in Russia. This general aviation airport is located 7 kilometres (3.8 NM) southwest of Oktyabrsky.

== Facilities ==
The airport is at an elevation of 377 feet (115 m) above mean sea level. It has one runway designated 18/36 with a 1,500-metre (4,921 ft) asphalt surface.

== See also ==
- List of airports in Russia
