= Oktyabrsky, Ufimsky District, Republic of Bashkortostan =

Oktyabrsky Октябрьский
- Selo
- Location within Bashkortostan Location within Russia
- Coordinates: 54°45′N 55°29′E
- Country: Russia
- Region: Bashkortostan
- District: Ufimsky District
- Time zone: UTC+5:00

Oktyabrsky (Russian: Октябрьский) is a rural locality (a selo) and the administrative centre of Shemyaksky Selsoviet, Ufimsky District, Bashkortostan, Russia. The population was 1,663 as of 2010. There are 20 streets.

== Geography ==
Oktyabrsky is located 43 km west of Ufa (the district's administrative centre) by road. Shemyak is the nearest rural locality.
