= Krasny Yar, Ufimsky District, Republic of Bashkortostan =

Krasny Yar Красный Яр
- Selo
- Location within Bashkortostan Location within Russia
- Coordinates: 54°53′N 55°55′E
- Country: Russia
- Region: Bashkortostan
- District: Ufimsky District
- Time zone: UTC+5:00

Krasny Yar (Russian: Красный Яр; Bashkir: Ҡыҙылъяр, Qıźılyar) is a rural locality (a selo) and the administrative centre of Krasnoyarsky Selsoviet, Ufimsky District, Bashkortostan, Russia. Its population was 1,615 as of 2010. It has 20 streets.

== Geography ==
Krasny Yar is located 29 km north of Ufa (the district's administrative centre) by road. Gornovo is the nearest rural locality.
