= Mishkinsky =

Mishkinsky (Russian: Мишкинский; masculine), Mishkinskaya (Мишкинская; feminine), or Mishkinskoye (Мишкинское; neuter) is the name of several rural localities in Russia:

- Mishkinsky (rural locality), a settlement in Muravlsky Selsoviet of Trosnyansky District of Oryol Oblast
- Mishkinskaya, a stanitsa in Mishkinskoye Rural Settlement of Aksaysky District of Rostov Oblast
