= Dmitriyevka, Ufimsky District, Republic of Bashkortostan =

Dmitriyevka Дмитриевка
- Selo
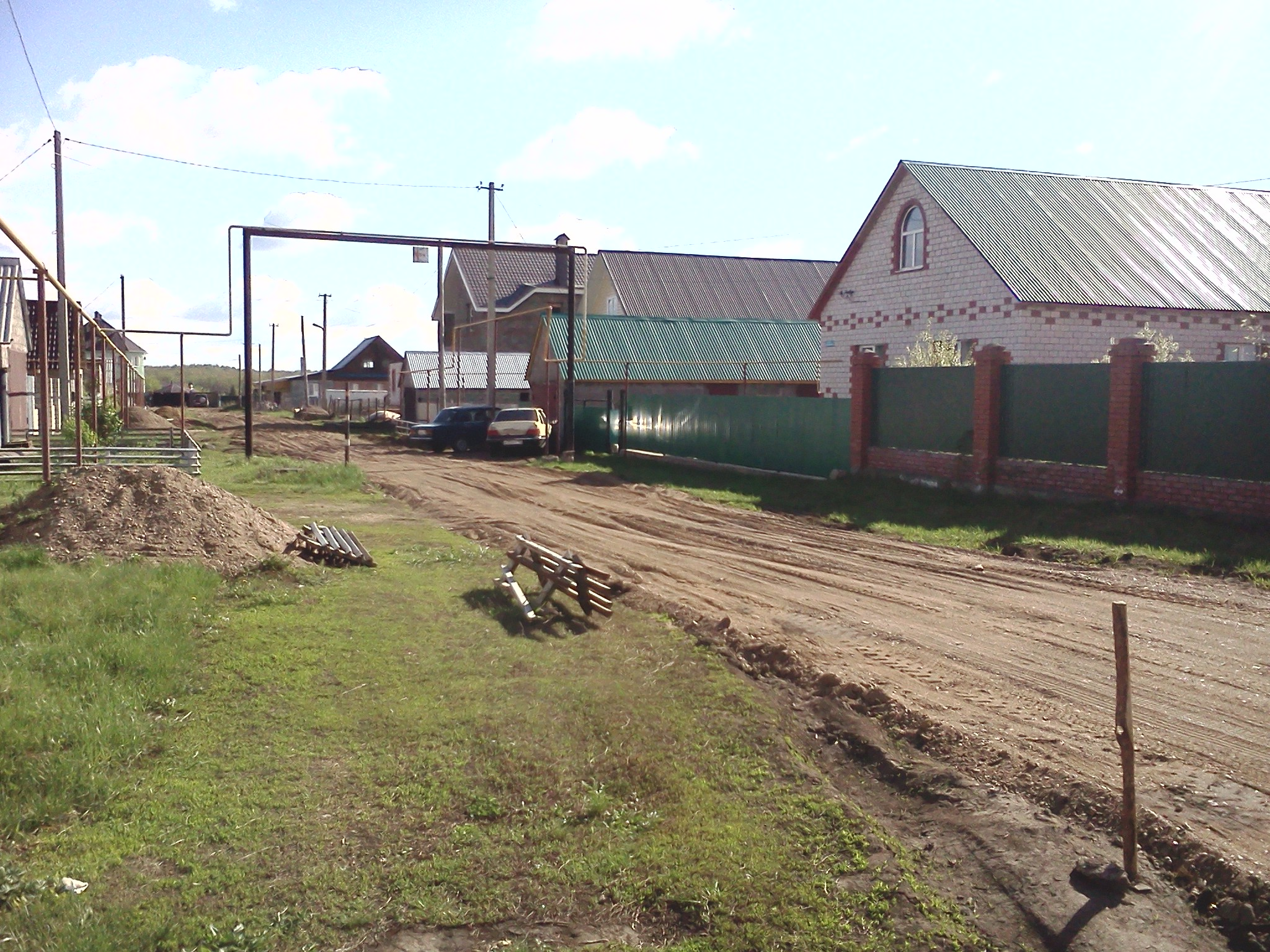
- Дмитриевка, пер. Молодежный - panoramio

- Location within Bashkortostan Location within Russia
- Coordinates: 54°48′N 55°47′E
- Country: Russia
- Region: Bashkortostan
- District: Ufimsky District
- Time zone: UTC+5:00

Dmitriyevka (Russian: Дмитриевка) is a rural locality (a selo) and the administrative centre of Dmitriyevsky Selsoviet, Ufimsky District, Bashkortostan, Russia. The population was 4351 as of 2010. There are 37 streets.

== Geography ==
Dmitriyevka is located 17 km northwest of Ufa (the district's administrative centre) by road. Yasny is the nearest rural locality.
