= Cherkassy, Sterlitamaksky District, Republic of Bashkortostan =

Cherkassy Черкассы
- Village
- Location within Bashkortostan Location within Russia
- Coordinates: 53°45′N 56°00′E
- Country: Russia
- Region: Bashkortostan
- District: Sterlitamaksky District
- Time zone: UTC+5:00

Cherkassy (Russian: Черкассы) is a rural locality (a village) in Krasnoyarsky Selsoviet, Sterlitamaksky District, Bashkortostan, Russia. The population was 160 as of 2010. There are 4 streets.

== Geography ==
Cherkassy is located 20 km north of Sterlitamak (the district's administrative centre) by road. Mikhaylovka is the nearest rural locality.
