= Amzya =

Amzya Амзя
- Village
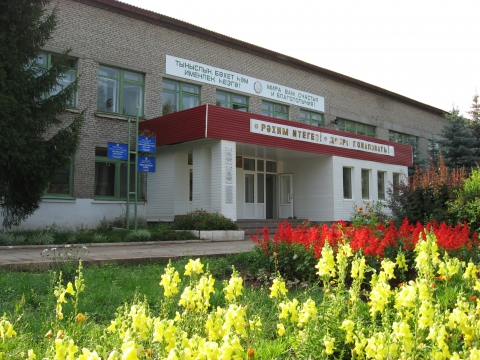

- Location within Bashkortostan Location within Russia
- Coordinates: 53°51′N 55°44′E
- Country: Russia
- Region: Bashkortostan
- District: Aurgazinsky District
- Time zone: UTC+5:00

Amzya (Russian: Амзя; Bashkir: Әмзә, Ämzä; Chuvash: Эмçе, Emśe) is a rural locality (a village) in Balyklykulsky Selsoviet, Aurgazinsky District, Bashkortostan, Russia. The population was 78 as of 2010, the majority of whom were Chuvashes. There are 5 streets.

== Geography ==
Amzya is located 21 km southwest of Tolbazy (the district's administrative centre) by road. Naumkino is the nearest rural locality.
