= Cherkassy, Ufimsky District, Republic of Bashkortostan =

Cherkassy Черкассы
- Selo
- Location within Bashkortostan Location within Russia
- Coordinates: 54°54′N 56°11′E
- Country: Russia
- Region: Bashkortostan
- District: Ufimsky District
- Time zone: UTC+5:00

Cherkassy (Russian: Черкассы) is a rural locality (a selo) in Cherkassky Selsoviet, Ufimsky District, Bashkortostan, Russia. The population was 710 as of 2010. There are 15 streets.

== Geography ==
Cherkassy is located 28 km northeast of Ufa (the district's administrative centre) by road. Novye Cherkassy is the nearest rural locality.
