= Bashkirenergo =

Russian power and heat company (1992–2012)

OJSC Bashkirenergo
- Native name: OAO «Башкирэнерго»
- Company type: Public company
- Founded: 1992 (Ufa)
- Defunct: 2012
- Headquarters: Ufa, Russia
- Revenue: RUB62,835 million (2010)
- Operating income: RUB4,116 million (2010)
- Net income: RUB2,791 million (2010)
- Parent: Sistema
- Website: www.bashkirenergo.ru/en/

OJSC Bashkirenergo (Russian: ОАО «Башкирэнерго») was a power and heat company operating in Bashkortostan, Russia. The major shareholder of the company is a holding company Sistema. 21.27% of shares is owned by the Russian grid company FGC UES.

== Reorganization ==
The company was dissolved in 2012, and the assets were divided between Bashenergoaktiv and Bashkir Grid Company;

JSC Bashenergoaktiv became part of Inter RAO. The electric grid complex (Bashkir Distribution Electric Networks LLC, Bashkir Grid Company LLC and Bashenergouchet LLC), which was part of Bashkirenergo OJSC, is included in BESK OJSC.
