= Oktyabrsky, Bashkortostan, Russia =

City in the Republic of Bashkortostan, Russia

Oktyabrskiy Октябрьский
- City
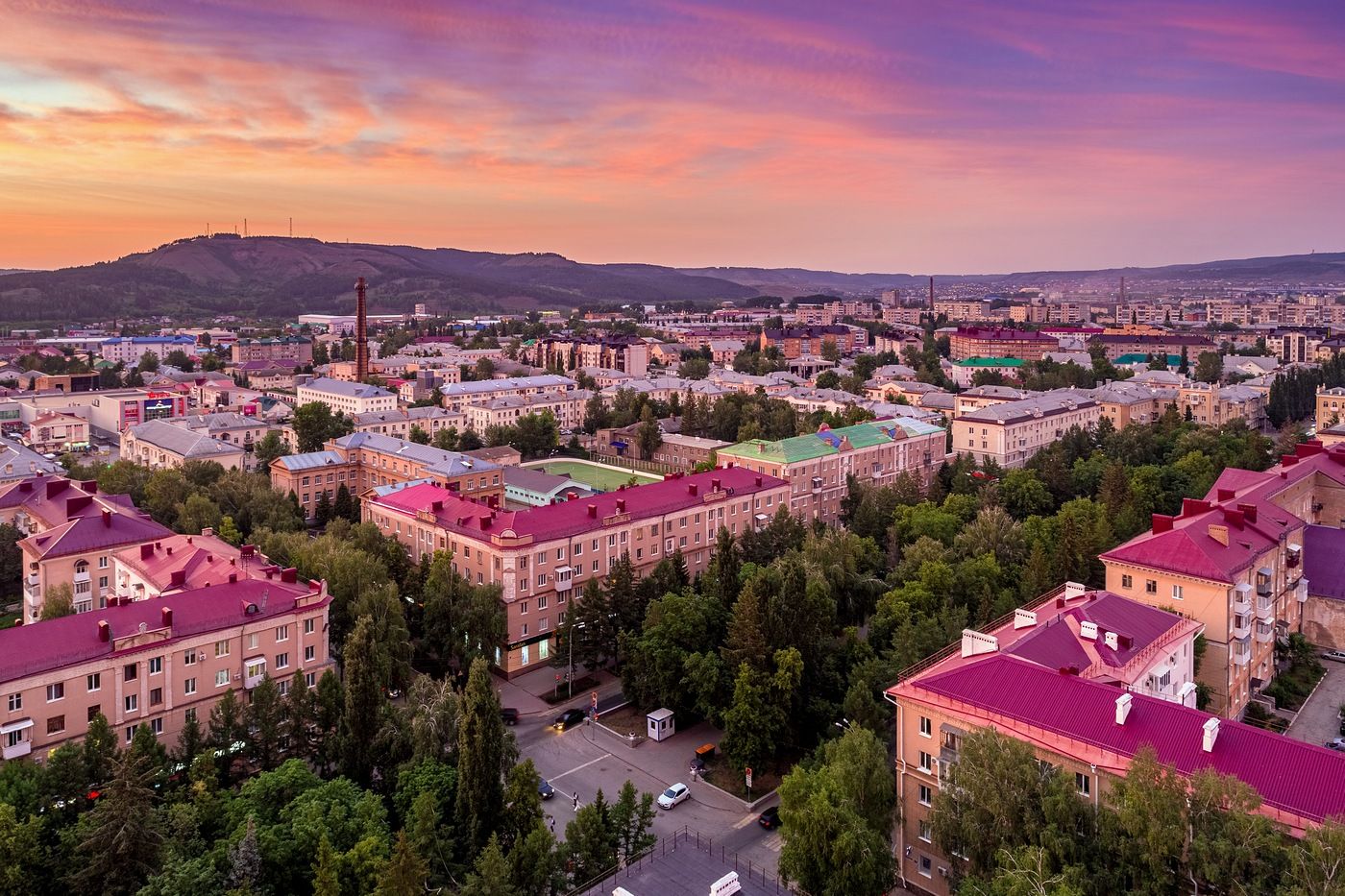

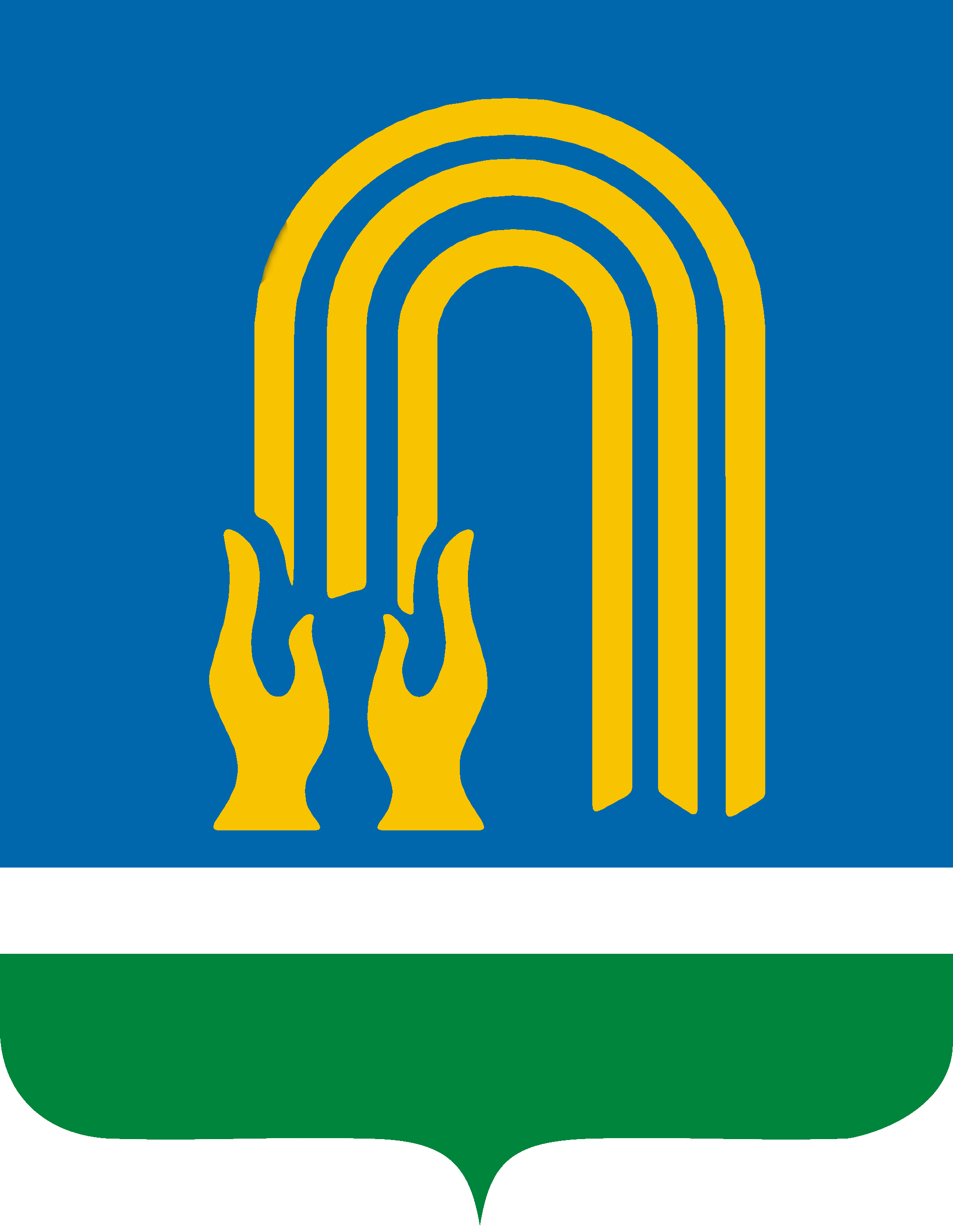
- Flag Coat of arms
- Interactive map of Oktyabrskiy
- Location of Oktyabrskiy Oktyabrskiy (Bashkortostan)
- Coordinates: 54°28′N 53°28′E
- Country: Russia
- Federal subject: Bashkortostan
- Founded: 1937
- Elevation: 140 m (460 ft)

Population (2010 Census)
  - Total: 109,474
  - Estimate (2025): 116,510 (+6.4%)
  - Rank: 147th in 2010

Administrative status
  - Subordinated to: city of republic significance of Oktyabrsky
  - Capital of: city of republic significance of Oktyabrsky

Municipal status
  - Urban okrug: Oktyabrsky Urban Okrug
  - Capital of: Oktyabrsky Urban Okrug
- Time zone: UTC+5 (MSK+2)
- Postal codes: 452600–452603, 452606, 452607, 452612–452616
- OKTMO ID: 80735000001
- Website: www.oktadm.ru

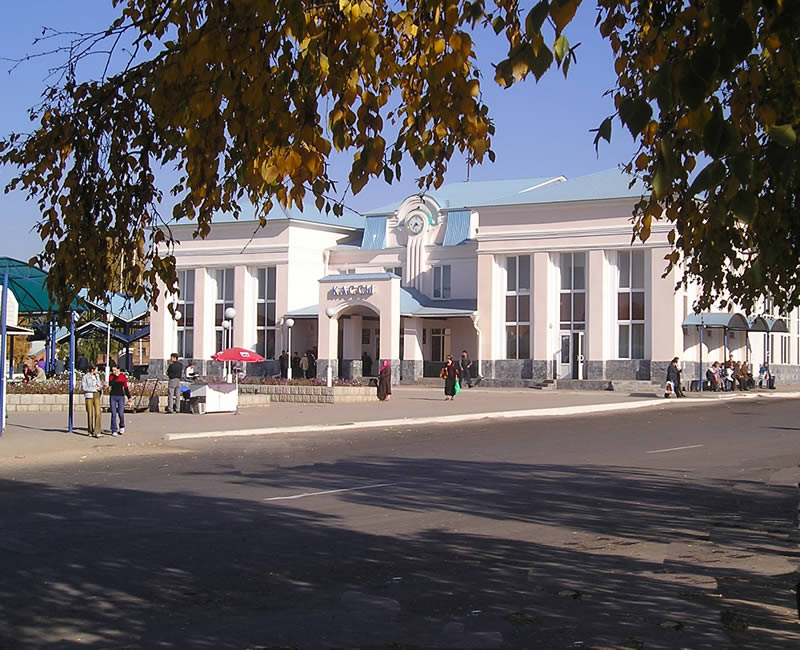
Bus station in Oktyabrsky

Oktyabrskiy (Russian and Bashkir: Октябрьский) is a city in the Republic of Bashkortostan, Russia, located on the Ik River. It is the fifth most-populous city in the republic, and the least of populous of its 5 cities with over 100,000 people. Population: 115,557 (2021 census); 109,474 (2010 census); 108,647 (2002 census); 104,732 (1989 Soviet census). Oktyabrskiy was ranked first among Category II cities (population 100,000 or higher, excluding administrative centers) in the 2015 edition of Most Comfortable City in Russia.

== Administrative and municipal status ==
Within the framework of administrative divisions, it is incorporated as the city of republic significance of Oktyabrsky—an administrative unit with the status equal to that of the districts. As a municipal division, the city of republic significance of Oktyabrsky is incorporated as Oktyabrsky Urban Okrug.

== Transportation ==
The city is served by the Oktyabrsky Airport.

== Sport ==
The Neftyanik Stadium is a multi-purpose stadium used primarily for motorcycle speedway and association football. Located on Komsomol'skaya Ulitsa, 206, it hosts the Lukoil Oktyabrsky speedway team that compete in the Russian league and also appeared in the European Speedway Club Champions' Cup in 1998, 2000 and 2001. The football team FC Devon Oktyabrsky were based at the stadium.
