= Neftekamsk =

City in the Republic of Bashkortostan, Russia

Neftekamsk Нефтекамск
- City

Other transcription(s)
  - Bashkir: Нефтекама
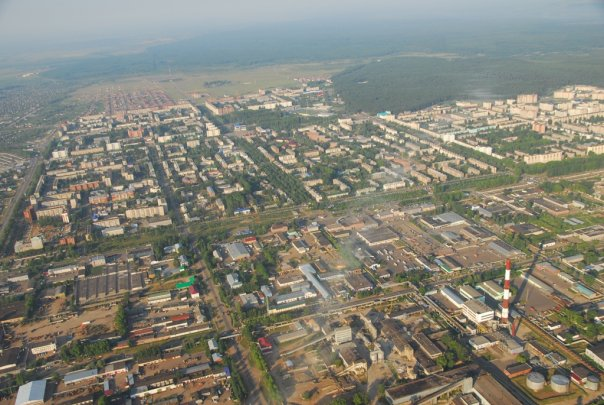
- Aerial view of Neftekamsk

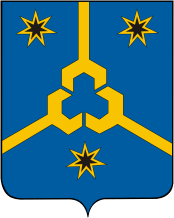
- Flag Coat of arms
- Interactive map of Neftekamsk
- Location of Neftekamsk Neftekamsk (Bashkortostan)
- Coordinates: 56°06′10″N 54°17′12″E
- Country: Russia
- Federal subject: Bashkortostan
- Founded: 1957
- City status since: 1963

Government
  - Head: Oleg Rudenko
- Elevation: 100 m (330 ft)

Population (2010 Census)
  - Total: 121,733
  - Estimate (2025): 133,874 (+10%)
  - Rank: 134th in 2010

Administrative status
  - Subordinated to: city of republic significance of Neftekamsk
  - Capital of: city of republic significance of Neftekamsk

Municipal status
  - Urban okrug: Neftekamsk Urban Okrug
  - Capital of: Neftekamsk Urban Okrug
- Time zone: UTC+5 (MSK+2)
- Postal code: 452680—452687
- Dialing code: +7 34783
- OKTMO ID: 80727000001
- Website: adm.neftekamsk.ru

Neftekamsk (Russian: Нефтека́мск; Bashkir: Нефтекама, romanized: Neftekama) is the fourth-most-populous city in the Republic of Bashkortostan, Russia. It is located in the northwest of the republic on the Kama River, 220 kilometers (140 mi) from the republic's capital Ufa. It is a large industrial and cultural center of the republic. Population: 121,733 (2010 census); 122,290 (2002 census); 106,801 (1989 Soviet census).

== Etymology ==
The city is named after the Kama River and petroleum (нефть, neft in Russian).

== Geography ==
The city's territory borders Krasnokamsky and Yanaulsky Districts. A road network connects the town to Ufa, Birsk, Yanaul, Agidel, Oktyabrsky, Izhevsk, Perm, and Kazan. The nearest railway station for long-distance trains is located in Amzya, 15 kilometers (9.3 mi) away. There is a local train connecting Neftekamsk with Yanaul via Amzya. Neftekamsk Airport serves the city.

== History ==
It was founded in 1957 after the discovery of an oil field in Krasnokamsky District. Town status was granted to it in 1963.

== Administrative and municipal status ==
Within the framework of administrative divisions, it is, together with seven rural localities, incorporated as the city of republic significance of Neftekamsk—an administrative unit with the status equal to that of the districts. As a municipal division, the city of republic significance of Neftekamsk is incorporated as Neftekamsk Urban Okrug.

=== Politics ===
In March 2019, Ratmir Mavliyev became the head of the city district administration. However, in March 2021, Eldar Sergeyevich Validov, who was initially his deputy, became the head of the city. Elections of deputies to the Council of the urban district of the city of Neftekamsk of the Republic of Bashkortostan of the fifth convocation in 2020 showed the following distribution of votes:

Party	Percentage of votes
Patriots of Russia	1.5%
A Just Russia	6.7%
Liberal Democratic Party of Russia	6.9%
Communist Party of the Russian Federation	15.1%
Civic Platform	3.2%
United Russia	59.2%
Yabloko	4.5%

Independent observers in Neftekamsk recorded violations during the elections to the City Duma, which were held early from 2am to 12pm on 13 September 2020.

== Demographics ==
Historical population
Year	Pop.	±%
1959	2,946	—
1970	46,482	+1477.8%
1979	69,586	+49.7%
1989	106,801	+53.5%
2002	122,290	+14.5%
2010	121,733	−0.5%
2021	131,942	+8.4%
Source: Censuses

The city ranks fourth in population in the republic after Ufa, Sterlitamak, and Salavat. In 2018, The City had a population of 127,821 people.

== Economy ==
The principal place of business of the city is the Neftekamsk Automotive Plant, which is one of the major producers of passenger buses in Russia.
