= Ufimsky District =

Ufimsky District Уфимский район (Russian)
- District

Other transcription(s)
  - Bashkir: Өфө районы
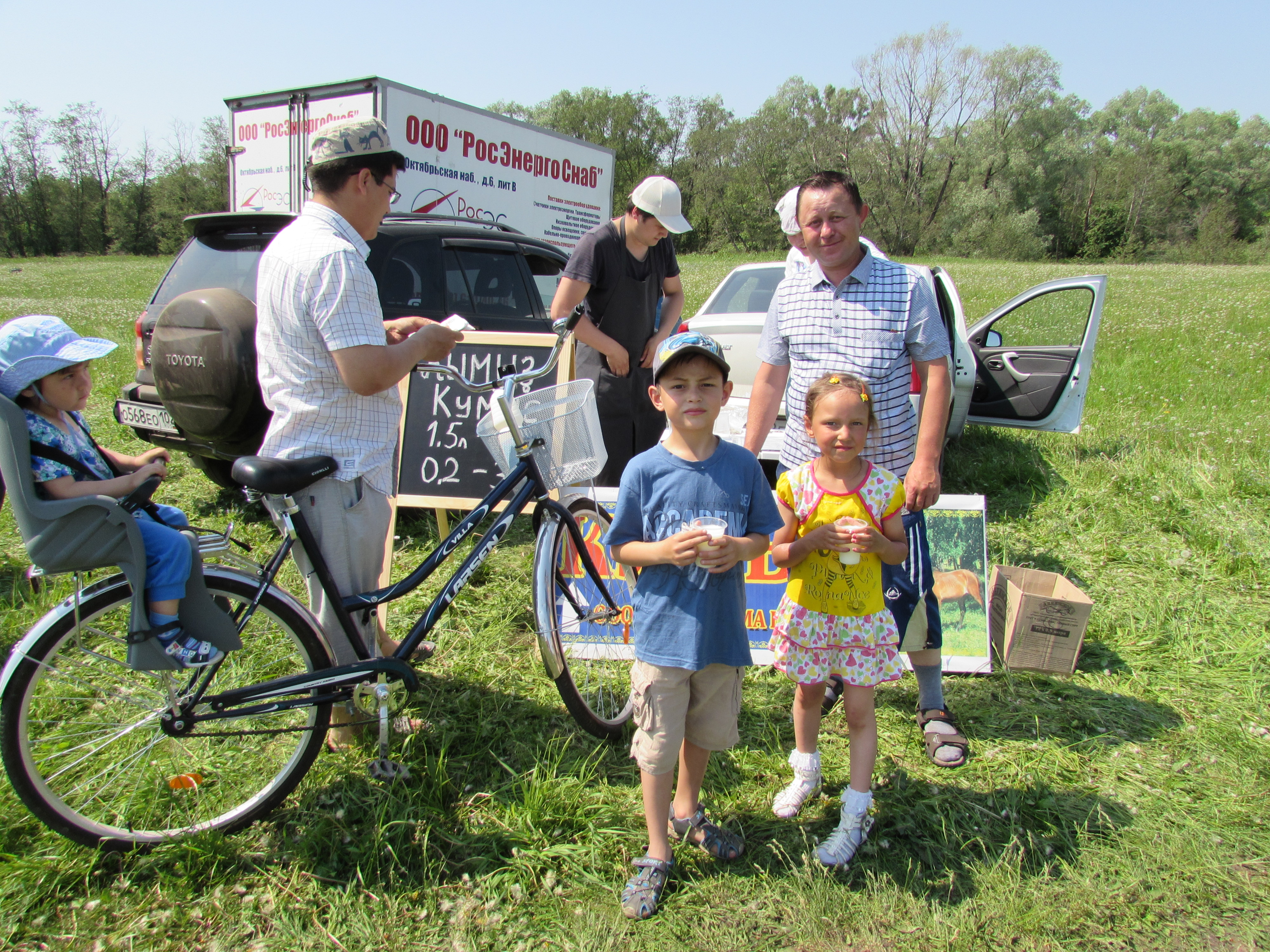
- Outdoor gathering, Ufimsky District

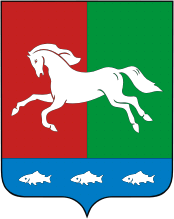
- Flag Coat of arms
- Location of Ufimsky District in the Republic of Bashkortostan
- Coordinates: 54°44′N 55°58′E
- Country: Russia
- Federal subject: Republic of Bashkortostan
- Established: August 20, 1930
- Administrative center: Ufa

Area
  - Total: 1,598.77 km^{2} (617.29 sq mi)

Population (2010 Census)
  - Total: 67,067
  - Density: 41.949/km^{2} (108.65/sq mi)
  - Urban: 0%
  - Rural: 100%

Administrative structure
  - Administrative divisions: 19 Selsoviets
  - Inhabited localities: 89 rural localities

Municipal structure
  - Municipally incorporated as: Ufimsky Municipal District
  - Municipal divisions: 0 urban settlements, 19 rural settlements
- Time zone: UTC+5 (MSK+2)
- OKTMO ID: 80652000
- Website: https://ufim.bashkortostan.ru/

Population of Ufimsky District
- 2010 Census: 67,067
- 2002 Census: 56,351
- 1989 Census: 52,599
- 1979 Census: 55,088

Ufimsky District (Russian: Уфи́мский райо́н; Bashkir: Өфө районы, Öfö rayonı) is an administrative and municipal district (raion), one of the fifty-four in the Republic of Bashkortostan, Russia. It is located in the center of the republic and borders with Kushnarenkovsky District in the northwest and north, Blagoveshchensky District in the north, Iglinsky District in the east, Karmaskalinsky District in the south, Chishminsky District in the southwest and west, and is split into two uneven parts by the territory of the city of republic significance of Ufa. The area of the district is 1,598.77 square kilometers (617.29 sq mi). Its administrative center is the city of Ufa (which is not administratively a part of the district). As of the 2010 Census, the total population of the district was 67,067.

== History ==
The district was established on August 20, 1930.

== Administrative and municipal status ==
Within the framework of administrative divisions, Ufimsky District is one of the fifty-four in the republic. It is divided into nineteen selsoviets, comprising eighty-nine rural localities. The city of Ufa serves as its administrative center, despite being incorporated separately as a city of republic significance—an administrative unit with the status equal to that of the districts.

As a municipal division, the district is incorporated as Ufimsky Municipal District. Its nineteen selsoviets are incorporated as nineteen rural settlements within the municipal district. The city of republic significance of Ufa is incorporated separately from the district as Ufa Urban Okrug, but serves as the administrative center of the municipal district as well.
