= Agidel (disambiguation) =

Agidel is a town in Bashkortostan, Russia.

Agidel or Aghidel may also refer to:

- Agidel Urban Okrug, a municipal formation set for the wown of Agidel, Bashkortostan, Russia
- Agidel River, native name of the Belaya river, Bashkortostan, Russia
- FC Agidel Ufa, name of FC Neftyanik Ufa, association football club based in Ufa, Russia (1995–1996)
- HC Agidel Ufa, ice hockey team in the Zhenskaya Hockey League (ZhHL)
