= Opinion polling for the 2016 Russian legislative election =

In the run up to the 2016 Russian legislative election, various organisations carried out opinion polling to gauge voting intention in Russia. Results of such polls are displayed in this article.

The date range for these opinion polls are from the previous legislative election, held on 4 December 2011, to 11 September 2016.

== Graphical summary ==
United Russia CPRF A Just Russia LDPR

== Party vote ==
Poll results are listed in the table below in reverse chronological order, showing the most recent first, and using the date the survey's fieldwork was done, as opposed to the date of publication. If that date is unknown, the date of publication is given instead. The highest percentage figure in each polling survey is displayed in bold, and the background shaded in the leading party's colour. If a tie occurs, then no figure is shaded. The lead column on the right shows the percentage-point difference between the two parties with the highest figures. When a specific poll does not show a data figure for a party, the party's cell corresponding to that poll is shown empty.

The table below represents mostly 2016 polls of Russian citizens (including voters who are undecided about which party they would vote for or are not sure whether they will actually vote, those saying they will not be voting, voters who have decided to spoil their ballots, supporters of any other party that is not on the list). Parties with more than 5% support (enough to enter State Duma) are given in bold. Throughout the campaign political analysts have predicted that only three or four parties will be elected to the Duma - UR, CPRF, LDPR, and JR.

Date	Poll source	UR	CPRF	LDPR	JR	PARNAS	Yabloko	CPl	Rodina	PoR	Greens	PoG (Note: In opinion polls often found under the old name of "Right Cause")	CoR	RPPJ	CPo	Lead
**18 September 2016**	**2016 result**	54.2%	13.3%	13.1%	**6.2%**	0.7%	2.0%	0.2%	1.5%	0.6%	0.8%	1.3%	2.3%	1.7%	0.1%	40.9%
11 September 2016	FOM	43%	8%	11%	**5%**	1%	1%	0%	1%	0%	0%	1%	0%	1%	0%	32%
11 September 2016	WCIOM	41.1%	7.4%	12.6%	**6.3%**	0.8%	1.1%	0.1%	1.1%	0.4%	0.6%	0.8%	0.6%	2.4%	0.0%	28.5%
4 September 2016	WCIOM	39.3%	8.7%	10.4%	**5.3%**	0.4%	1.1%	0.2%	0.8%	0.2%	0.5%	0.8%	0.4%	1.6%	0.0%	28.9%
4 September 2016	FOM	41%	9%	11%	4%	0%	1%	0%	1%	0%	0%	0%	0%	1%	0%	30%
26-29 August 2016	Levada Centre	31%	10%	9%	**5%**	1%	1%	<1%	1%	<1%	1%	<1%	1%	1%	<1%	21%
28 August 2016	WCIOM	41.2%	7.7%	12.2%	**5.4%**	0.4%	1.3%	0.4%	0.9%	0.4%	0.3%	0.6%	0.4%	1.9%	0.2%	29%
28 August 2016	FOM	44%	8%	11%	**5%**	0%	1%	0%	1%	0%	1%	0%	0%	1%	0%	33%
21 August 2016	WCIOM	43.3%	8.4%	10.8%	**6.6%**	0.6%	0.9%	0.2%	0.6%	0.2%	0.2%	0.8%	0.4%	1.4%	0.0%	32.5%
21 August 2016	FOM	45%	9%	8%	4%	0%	1%	0%	1%	0%	0%	0%	0%	1%	0%	36%
14 August 2016	WCIOM	44.0%	10.1%	11.8%	**7.5%**	0.3%	1.0%	0.0%	0.3%	0.2%	0.2%	0.6%	0.3%	0.9%	0.2%	32.2%
14 August 2016	FOM	42%	10%	9%	**8%**	<1%	1%	<1%	<1%	1%	<1%	<1%	<1%	<1%	<1%	32%
7 August 2016	FOM	45%	10%	8%	**8%**	<1%	1%	1%	<1%	<1%	<1%	<1%	<1%	<1%	<1%	35%
31 July 2016	FOM	47%	9%	8%	**8%**	<1%	<1%	1%	<1%	<1%	–	<1%	<1%	<1%	<1%	38%
25 July 2016	Levada Centre	39%	10%	10%	3%	1%	1%	<1%	<1%	<1%	<1%	<1%	1%	<1%	<1%	29%
24 July 2016	FOM	44%	10%	11%	**7%**	<1%	1%	<1%	<1%	1%	–	<1%	<1%	<1%	<1%	33%
24 July 2016	WCIOM	44.1%	10.1%	10.7%	**6.4%**	0.4%	1.1%	0.2%	0.3%	0.1%	0.5%	0.4%	0.1%	0.7%	0.0%	33.4%
17 July 2016	FOM	45%	10%	12%	**7%**	<1%	1%	<1%	<1%	1%	–	<1%	<1%	<1%	<1%	33%
17 July 2016	WCIOM	44.9%	8.7%	11.3%	**6.7%**	0.3%	0.7%	0.2%	0.3%	0.2%	0.2%	0.7%	0.1%	0.8%	0.1%	33.6%
10 July 2016	FOM	46%	10%	12%	**6%**	<1%	1%	<1%	<1%	1%	–	<1%	<1%	<1%	<1%	34%
10 July 2016	WCIOM	44%	9.9%	10.5%	**7.8%**	0.1%	0.8%	0.2%	0.1%	0.4%	0.6%	0.2%	0.4%	0.5%	0.0%	33.5%
3 July 2016	WCIOM	44.3%	10.4%	9.0%	**7.9%**	0.5%	0.8%	0.3%	0.4%	0.3%	0.3%	0.4%	0.2%	0.6%	0.0%	33.9%
3 July 2016	FOM	46%	10%	11%	**7%**	<1%	1%	<1%	<1%	1%	–	<1%	<1%	<1%	<1%	35%
27 June 2016	Levada Centre	55.8%	18.2%	14.2%	**5.1%**	–	–	–	–	–	–	–	–	–	–	37.6%
26 June 2016	WCIOM	45.1%	9.4%	10.1%	**6.5%**	0.4%	1.1%	0.3%	0.3%	0.6%	0.2%	0.5%	0.7%	0.4%	0.0%	35%
26 June 2016	FOM	45%	10%	11%	**6%**	<1%	1%	1%	<1%	<1%	–	<1%	<1%	<1%	<1%	34%
24 June 2016	FBK	39%	6%	5%	4%	<1%	<1%	–	–	–	–	–	–	–	–	33%
19 June 2016	WCIOM	43.1%	9.5%	11.4%	**6.9%**	0.6%	1%	0.1%	0.2%	0.2%	0.2%	0.3%	0.2%	0.7%	0.1%	31.7%
12 June 2016	WCIOM	45.5%	8.9%	9.7%	**6.8%**	0.1%	1.2%	0.3%	0.4%	0.3%	0.5%	0.3%	0.4%	0.6%	0.1%	35.8%
5 June 2016	FOM	48%	10%	11%	**5%**	<1%	1%	<1%	<1%	1%	–	<1%	<1%	<1%	<1%	37%
5 June 2016	WCIOM	46.7%	10.3%	10.1%	**5.1%**	0.3%	0.8%	0.4%	0.2%	0.5%	0.6%	0.2%	0.4%	0.5%	0.1%	36.4%
29 May 2016	WCIOM	45.4%	9.9%	9.9%	**5.5%**	0.3%	1.3%	0.3%	0.1%	0.3%	0.5%	0.1%	0.1%	0.8%	0.2%	35.5%
22 May 2016	WCIOM	46.2%	9.3%	11%	**5.9%**	0.3%	1.2%	0.2%	0.1%	0.5%	0.5%	0.2%	0.3%	0.5%	0.1%	35.2%
15 May 2016	WCIOM	47.9%	10.1%	10.8%	**5.8%**	0.2%	0.9%	0.3%	0.1%	0.2%	0.4%	0.1%	0.3%	0.3%	0.0%	37.1%
1 May 2016	WCIOM	49%	10.7%	10.5%	**6.4%**	0.4%	1.1%	0.1%	0.3%	0.1%	0.5%	0.4%	0.3%	0.8%	0.2%	38.3%
24 April 2016	WCIOM	48.5%	9.1%	9.9%	**6.4%**	0.2%	0.9%	0.3%	0.2%	0.5%	0.3%	0.3%	0.4%	0.6%	0.1%	38.6%
17 April 2016	WCIOM	47.6%	10%	9.2%	**5.6%**	0.4%	1%	0.1%	0.4%	0.5%	0.5%	0.4%	0.6%	0.9%	0.1%	37.6%
10 April 2016	FOM	46%	9%	11%	**5%**	1%	1%	1%	<1%	1%	–	<1%	<1%	<1%	<1%	35%
10 April 2016	WCIOM	45.7%	10.3%	10.6%	**6.6%**	0.3%	1.5%	0.6%	0.4%	0.2%	0.5%	0.3%	0.2%	1.0%	0.0%	35.1%
3 April 2016	WCIOM	47.9%	9%	8.5%	**6.3%**	0.5%	0.7%	0.4%	0.1%	0.4%	0.2%	0.1%	0.2%	0.6%	0.0%	38.9%
27 March 2016	WCIOM	47.5%	9.1%	9.3%	**5.4%**	0.4%	1.7%	0.3%	0.4%	0.5%	0.3%	0.2%	0.3%	1.0%	0.3%	38.2%
20 March 2016	WCIOM	44.1%	10.1%	9.6%	**6.3%**	0.8%	1.5%	0.5%	0.4%	0.4%	0.3%	0.3%	0.6%	0.3%	0.1%	34%
February 2016	WCIOM (Note: Average result for month)	49%	9%	9%	**6%**	–	–	–	–	–	–	–	–	–	–	40%
10 February 2016	Levada Centre	39%	10%	5%	3%	<1%	1%	1%	1%	1%	<1%	–	–	–	–	29%
January 2016	WCIOM (Note: Average result for month)	51%	9%	8%	**5%**	–	–	–	–	–	–	–	–	–	–	42%
December 2015	WCIOM (Note: Average result for month)	53%	8%	6%	**5%**	–	–	–	–	–	–	–	–	–	–	45%
10 December 2015	Levada Centre	44%	10%	5%	2%	<1%	1%	1%	1%	1%	1%	–	–	–	–	34%
November 2015	WCIOM (Note: Average result for month)	53%	8%	7%	**5%**	–	–	–	–	–	–	–	–	–	–	45%
October 2015	WCIOM (Note: Average result for month)	55%	8%	6%	**5%**	–	–	–	–	–	–	–	–	–	–	47%
5 October 2015	Levada Centre	40%	11%	6%	3%	1%	1%	1%	1%	1%	1%	–	–	–	–	31%
September 2015	WCIOM (Note: Average result for month)	53%	8%	7%	**5%**	–	–	–	–	–	–	–	–	–	–	45%
7 September 2015	Levada Centre	43%	11%	5%	3%	1%	1%	1%	1%	1%	2%	–	–	–	–	32%
4 December 2011	2011 Result	49.32%	19.19%	11.67%	**13.24%**	—	3.43%	—	—	0.97%	—	0.60%	—	—	—	30.13%
