= 2016 Russian legislative election =

- 18 September 2016

All 450 seats to the State Duma 226 seats needed for a majority
- Opinion polls
- Turnout: 47.88% (▼12.22 pp)
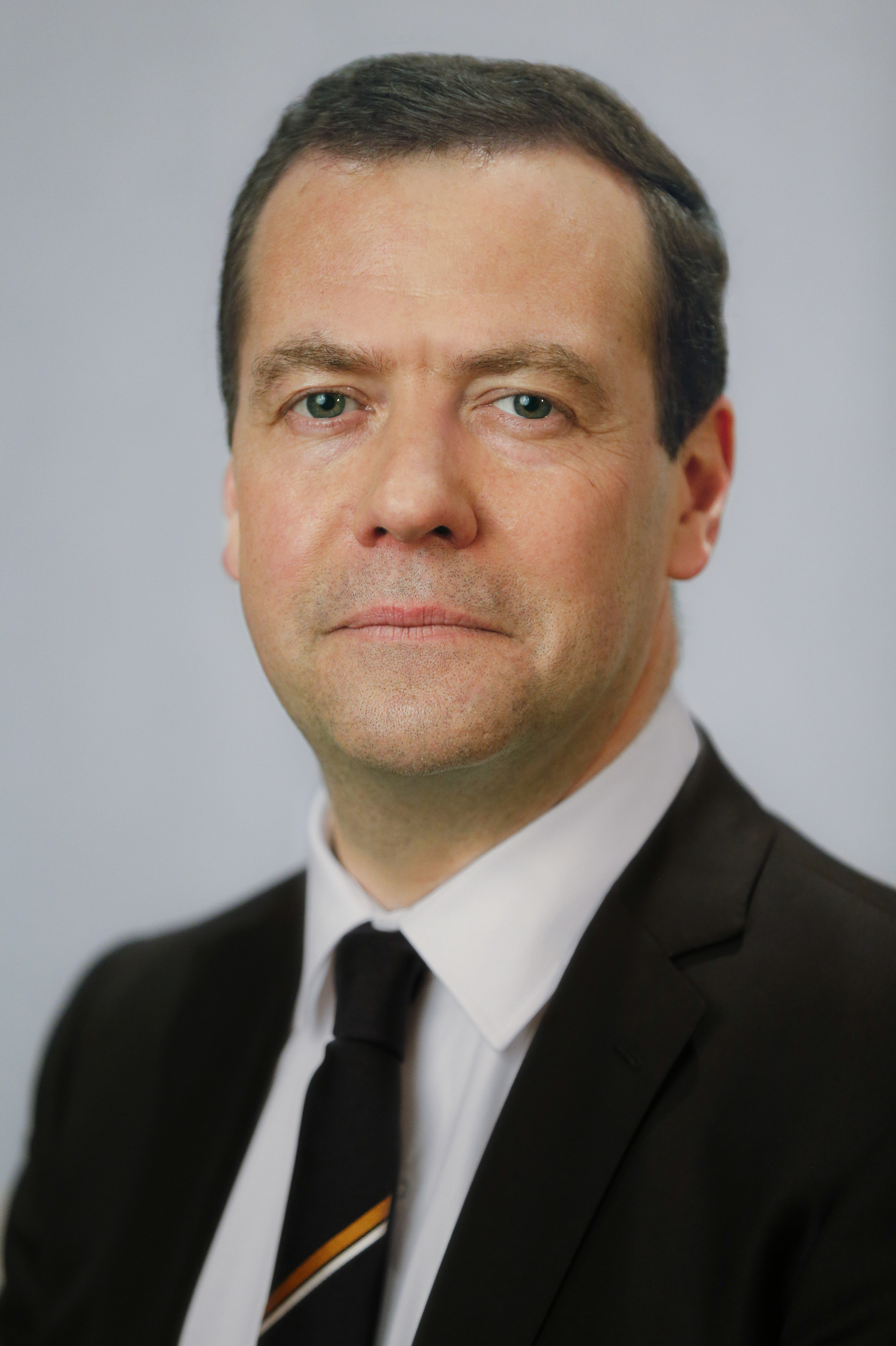

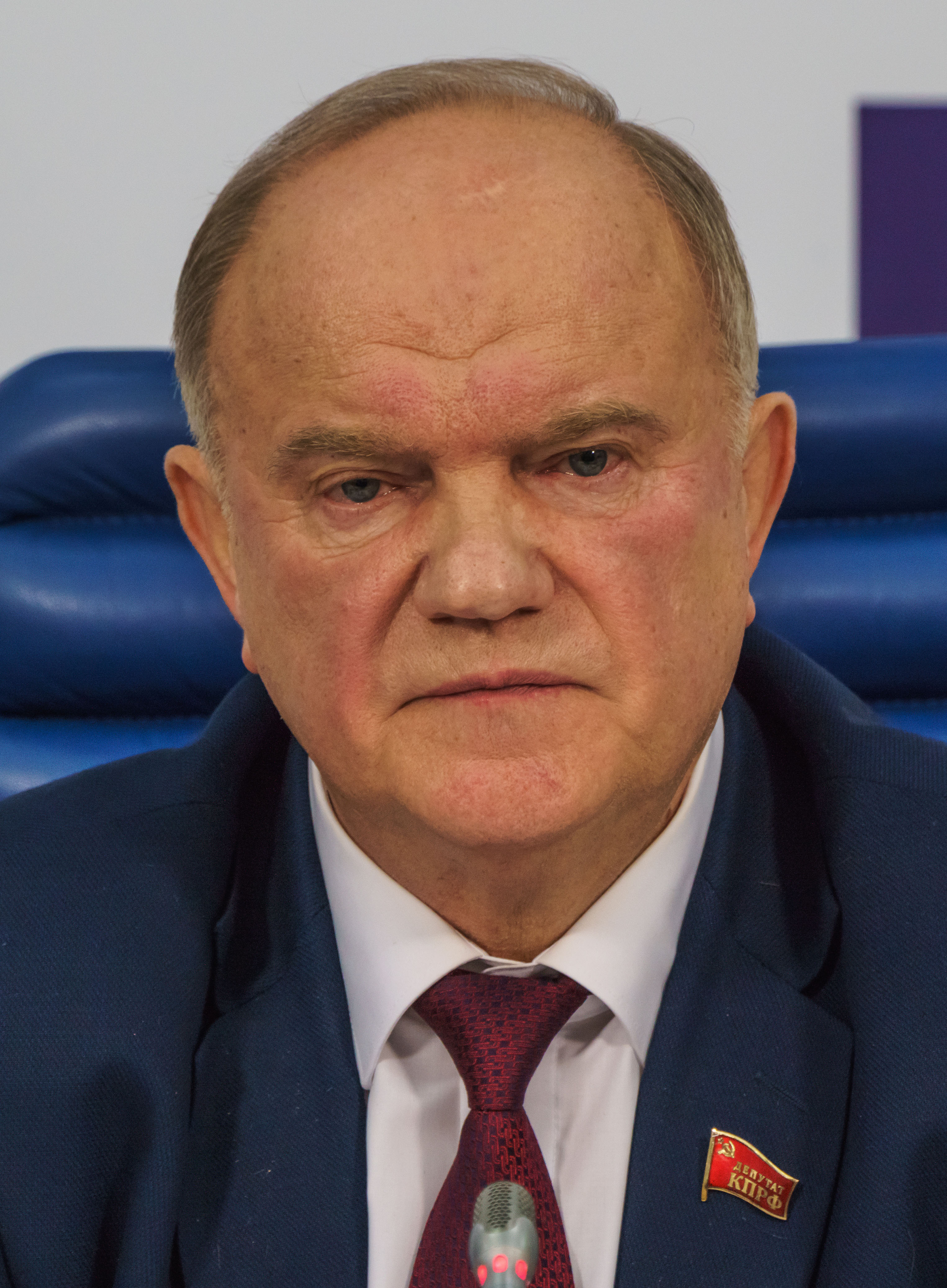

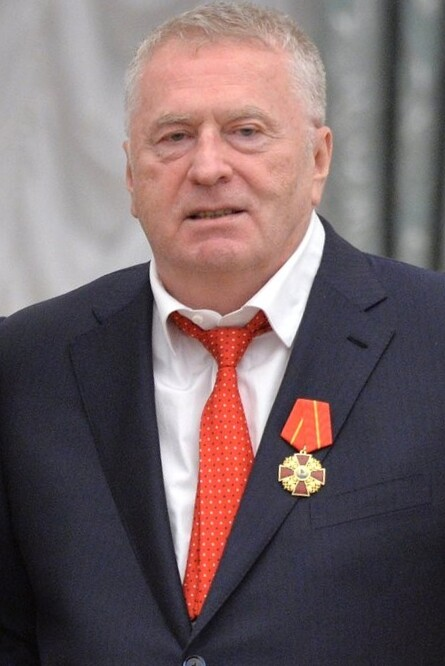

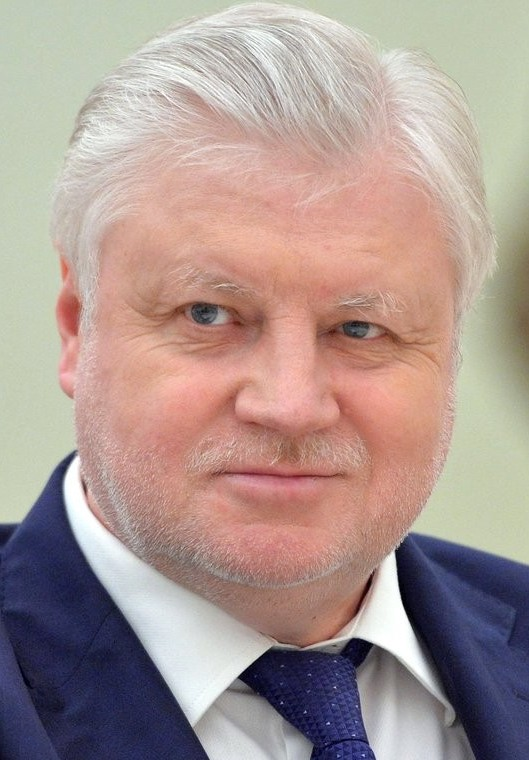

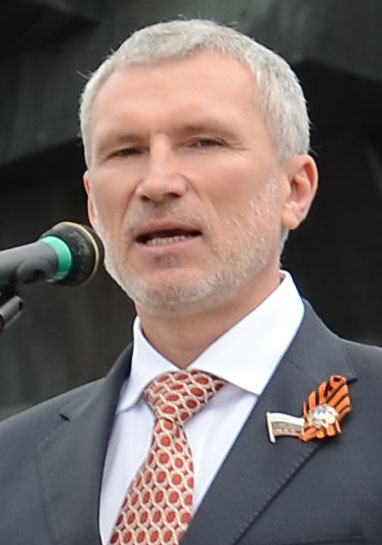

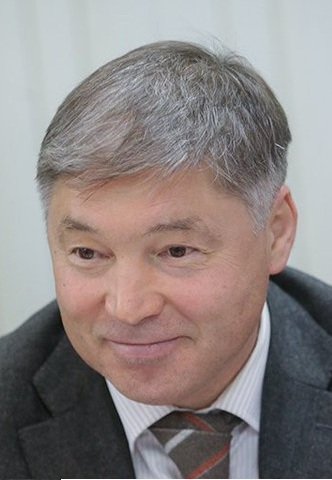
	First party	Second party	Third party
Leader	Dmitry Medvedev	Gennady Zyuganov	Vladimir Zhirinovsky
Party	United Russia	CPRF	LDPR
Leader since	26 May 2012	14 February 1993	12 April 1991
Leader's seat	Federal List	Federal List	Federal List
Last election	238 seats, 49.32%	92 seats, 19.19%	56 seats, 11.67%
Seats won	343	42	39
Seat change	▲105	▼50	▼17
Popular vote	28,527,828	7,019,752	6,917,063
Percentage	54.20%	13.34%	13.14%
Swing	▲4.87pp	▼5.85pp	▲1.47pp
	Fourth party	Fifth party	Sixth party
Leader	Sergey Mironov	Aleksey Zhuravlyov	Rifat Shaykhutdinov
Party	A Just Russia	Rodina	Civic Platform
Leader since	27 October 2013	29 September 2012	17 April 2015
Leader's seat	Federal List	Anna / Federal List	Neftekamsk / Federal List
Last election	64 seats, 13.24%	—	—
Seats won	23	1	1
Seat change	▼41	▲1	▲1
Popular vote	3,275,053	792,226	115,433
Percentage	6.22%	1.51%	0.22%
Swing	▼7.02pp	▲1.51pp	▲0.22pp
- The upper map shows the winning party vote in the territorial election commissions, the lower map shows the party of the winner and his vote in the single mandate constituencies.
Chairman before election
Sergey Naryshkin
United Russia
Elected Chairman
Vyacheslav Volodin
United Russia

Legislative elections were held in Russia on 18 September 2016, having been brought forward from 4 December. At stake were the 450 seats in the State Duma of the 7th convocation, the lower house of the Federal Assembly. Prior to the election United Russia had been the ruling party since winning the 2011 elections with 49.32% of the vote, and taking 238 seats (53%) of the seats in the State Duma.

Prior to the election, observers expected that turnout would be low and called the election campaign the dullest in recent memory. 109,820,679 voters were registered in the Russian Federation (including Crimea) (Note: Recognized by most members of the UN as part of Ukraine.) on 1 January 2016. Taking into account people registered outside the Russian Federation and the voters in Baikonur, the total number of eligible voters for 1 January 2016 was 111,724,534. The vote had a record low turnout of 47.88%, with just 28% of Muscovites casting their votes before 6 pm.

== Background ==
Although the elections had been planned for 4 December 2016, deputies discussed the issue of rescheduling to an earlier date since the spring of 2015, with the second and third Sundays of September or October 2016 as possible alternatives. On 1 July 2015, the Constitutional Court of Russia accepted the possibility of conducting early elections to the Duma in 2016 under certain conditions. According to the Court, the constitution does not require the election date to be exactly five years after the previous elections and the election date can be shifted if the following conditions are met:

- Shifting of the election date does not disrupt reasonable periodicity of elections.
- Limiting of the real terms of the Duma deputies is insignificant (less than a few months).
- Shifting of the election dates is announced in advance, so to give all the parties enough time to prepare for the elections.

On 19 June 2015, the State Duma approved the first reading of a bill to bring the election to the State Duma forward from 4 December 2016 to the third Sunday of September 2016. The corresponding bill was adopted by the State Duma on the second and third (and final) reading with 339 deputies in favour and 102 against, with no abstentions. The document was put together by the speaker of the Duma, Sergei Naryshkin, along with three leaders of major Duma parties, Vladimir Vasilyev (United Russia), Vladimir Zhirinovsky (Liberal Democratic Party), and Sergei Mironov (A Just Russia). The initiative to transfer the date of elections had not been supported by the deputies of the Communist Party, who called it an unconstitutional decision. Earlier, a similar opinion had been expressed by the leader of the Communist Party, Gennady Zyuganov. The September elections were not satisfactory to the Communists in part because the debate fell in August, "when one will be in the garden, the latter on the beach, others with their children" said Zyuganov. The Russian government supported the bill.

On 17 June 2016, President Vladimir Putin signed a decree on the appointment of the State Duma elections on 18 September 2016. From that day parties had the right to start the nomination process for deputies to hold congresses and transmit documents of candidates to the Central Election Commission of the Russian Federation (CEC) for registration.

For the first time since the controversial and unilateral 2014 Russian annexation of Crimea (from Ukraine), Crimean voters could vote in a Russian general election. Ukraine strongly condemned the vote. Various countries (among them the United States, Canada, the United Kingdom and France) did not recognize the legitimacy of the election in Crimea. According to Russia correspondent for Al Jazeera English Rory Challands reporting on election day, "despite many Crimeans voting in Russian elections for 1st time, there's little excitement. Main sentiments so far are apathy and cynicism." Scuffles between police and Ukrainian nationalists were reported near polling stations for Russian citizens in the Ukrainian cities of Kyiv and Odesa.

In Syria, 4,751 Russian citizens (most of them taking part in the Russian military intervention in Syria) voted.

== Electoral system ==
Single-member constituency map adopted in 2015.

The State Duma is elected on a single election day for a term of five years, with parallel voting that was used between 1993 and 2003.

Out of 450 seats, 225 are elected by proportional representation from party lists with a 5% electoral threshold, the whole country forming a single constituency. Each political party should adopt a party list which should be divided into a federal part and regional groups. The federal part should have from 1 to 10 candidates, with the rest of the party list candidates comprising the regional groups. There should be at least 35 regional groups. Total number of candidates in a party list should be between 200 and 400.

Seats are allocated using Hare quota and largest remainder method.

The other 225 seats are elected in single-member constituencies using the first-past-the-post system.

== Chronology ==
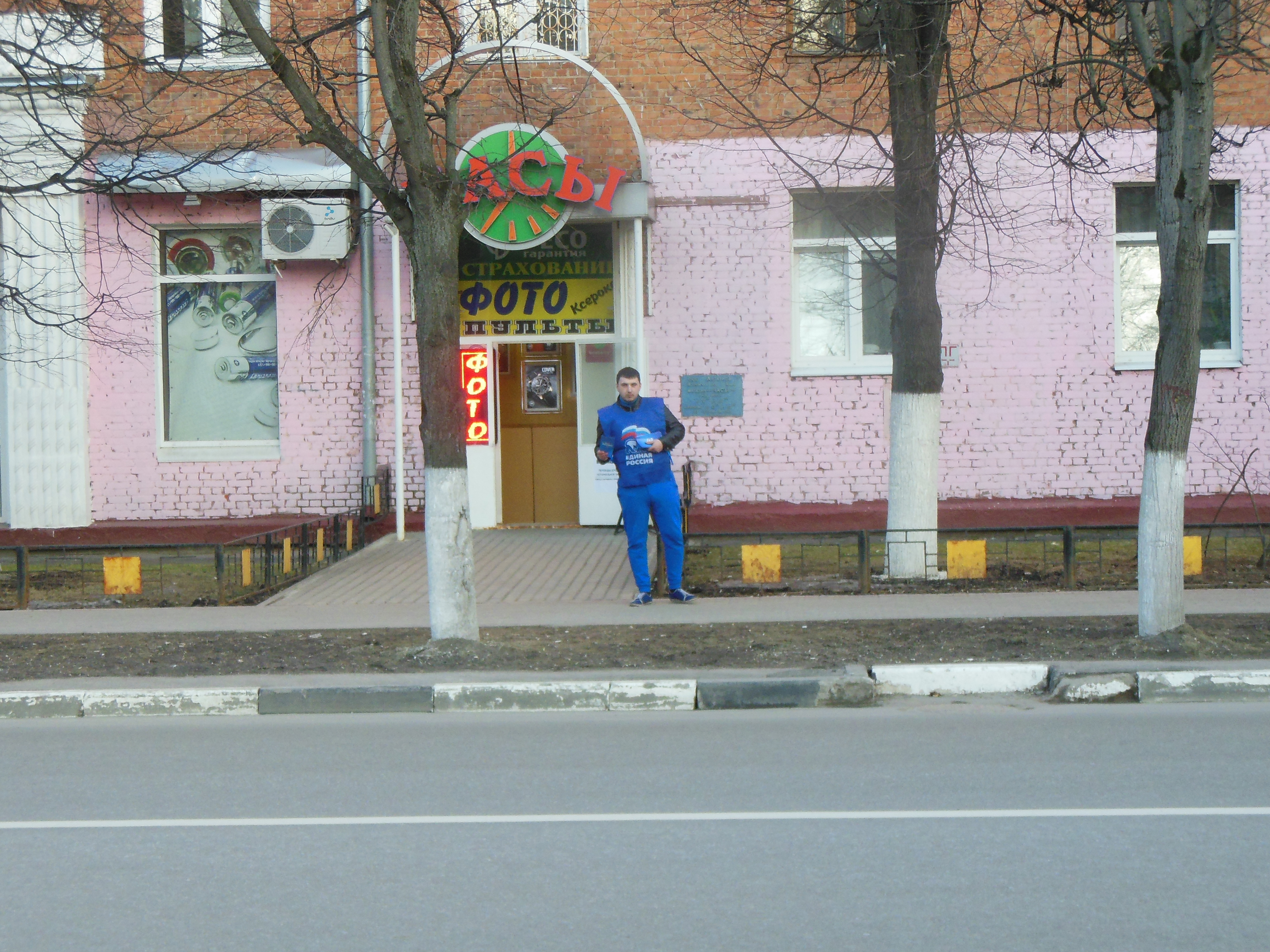
A supporter of United Russia handing out leaflets in the street

On 17 June, President Vladimir Putin set the date of the election as 18 September 2016. On 20 June the Central Election Commission approved the calendar of the election campaign.

- From 18 June to 13 July – Period for nomination of candidates (parties in the federal list and single-mandate constituencies, self-nominated in single member constituencies).
- From 4 July to 3 August – Period of registration of federal lists of candidates to the Central Election Commission and of the registration of candidates in single-member constituencies in the district election commissions.
- 12 August – Draw that decided allocation of parties on the federal-list ballot was held.
- 16 and 18 August – Draw that decided distribution of free TV time (16 August) and free space for parties or candidates in newspapers (18 August) was held.
- From 20 August to 16 September – Election campaign.
- From 3 August to 6 September – Territorial election commissions issue absentee ballots.
- From 7 to 17 September – Voters can get absentee ballots through election commissions at polling station.
- 17 September – Day of Election silence.
- 18 September – Election day.

== Conduct ==
The Organization for Security and Co-operation in Europe published its full report of the election on 23 December 2016. It noted many problems with the election, such as the lack of "clear political alternatives [with the main four parliamentary parties, limiting] voters' choice", over-regulation of the registration of political parties, lack of proper conduct during counting of votes, voters not folding their ballots on 70% of occasions and lack of transparency of campaign finance.

== Participating parties ==
The Central Election Commission determined that 14 political parties could submit lists of candidates without collecting signatures. Whilst other parties were required to present at least 200,000 signatures (with a maximum of 7,000 signatures per region).

=== Parties that participated in the election ===
Fourteen parties were registered to participate in the election. These are the same fourteen parties that did not have to collect signatures in order to participate. None of the parties tasked with collecting signatures were registered on the ballot due to various violations or failure to submit documents.

No. on ballot	Party	Abb.	Party leader	No. 1 in party list	Convention date	Ideology	Contesting on party list?	Contesting on SMC?	Notes
1	Rodina	Rodina	Aleksey Zhuravlyov	Aleksey Zhuravlyov	2 July 2016	National conservatism / Ultranationalism	✓	✓	CEC registered the list of candidates on 8 August
2	Communists of Russia	CoR	Maxim Suraykin	Maxim Suraykin	1 July 2016	Communism / Marxism–Leninism	✓	✓	CEC registered the list of candidates on 3 August
3	Russian Party of Pensioners for Justice	RPPJ	Vladimir Burakov	Vladimir Burakov	9 July 2016	Social conservatism	✓	✘	CEC registered the list of candidates on 12 August
4	United Russia	UR	Dmitry Medvedev	Dmitry Medvedev	26–27 June 2016	Statism / Centrism / National conservatism	✓	✓	CEC registered the list of candidates on 12 August
5	Russian Ecological Party "The Greens"	Greens	Anatoly Panfilov	Oleg Mitvol	6 July 2016	Environmentalism / Centrism / Green politics	✓	✓	CEC registered the list of candidates on 29 July
6	Civic Platform	CPl	Rifat Shaykhutdinov	Rifat Shaykhutdinov	2 July 2016	Conservatism / Economic Liberalism	✓	✓	CEC registered the list of candidates on 27 July
7	Liberal Democratic Party of Russia	LDPR	Vladimir Zhirinovsky	Vladimir Zhirinovsky	28 June 2016	Russian nationalism / Pan-Slavism / Euroscepticism / Anticommunism	✓	✓	CEC registered the list of candidates on 18 July
8	People's Freedom Party	PARNAS	Mikhail Kasyanov	Mikhail Kasyanov	2 July 2016	Conservative liberalism / Liberal democracy / Pro-Europeanism	✓	✓	CEC registered the list of candidates on 3 August
9	Party of Growth	PoG	Boris Titov	Boris Titov	4 July 2016	Liberal conservatism	✓	✓	CEC registered the list of candidates on 1 August
10	Civilian Power	CPo	Kirill Bykanin	Kirill Bykanin	8 July 2016	Liberalism / Green politics	✓	✓	CEC registered the list of candidates on 3 August
11	Yabloko	Yabloko	Emilia Slabunova	Grigory Yavlinsky	1–3 July 2016	Social liberalism / Pro-Europeanism / Social democracy	✓	✓	CEC registered the list of candidates on 5 August
12	Communist Party of the Russian Federation	CPRF	Gennady Zyuganov	Gennady Zyuganov	25 June 2016	Communism / Left-wing nationalism	✓	✓	CEC registered the list of candidates on 1 August
13	Patriots of Russia	PoR	Gennady Semigin	Gennady Semigin	1 July 2016	Democratic socialism / Left-wing nationalism	✓	✓	CEC registered the list of candidates on 27 July
14	A Just Russia	JR	Sergey Mironov	Sergey Mironov	27 June 2016	Social democracy / Democratic socialism	✓	✓	CEC registered the list of candidates on 22 July

=== Parties that did not participate in the election ===
Party	Abb.	Party leader	No. 1 in party list	Convention date	Ideology	Notes
Alliance of Greens and Social Democrats	AGSD	Alexander Zakondyrin	Alexander Zakondyrin	2 July 2016	Grassroots democracy	Barred from the election because the party leadership did not notify the CEC about holding a pre-election convention
Great Fatherland Party	PVO	Nikolai Starikov	Nikolai Starikov	28 June 2016	Centrism / National conservatism	CEC refused to register the list of candidates
Native Party	NP	Alexander Samokhin	—	24 June 2016		Party failed to submit the necessary signatures and as such will not be participating in the election
Party of Good Deeds	PDD	Andrey Kirillov	—	2 July 2016		Party did not submit documents to the CEC
Party of the Parents of Future	PPF	Marina Voronova	—	—		Party failed to submit the necessary signatures and as such will not be participating in the election
Party of Rural Revival	PRR	Vasily Vershinin	—	6 July 2016	Agrarianism	Announced that it would not be taking part in the election. However, nominated several candidates in single-member districts
Party of Social Reforms	PSR	Stanislav Polishchuk	—	26 June 2016		Barred from the election due to critical deficiencies in the documents filed with the CEC
People Against Corruption	PAC	Grigory Anisimov	—	22 June 2016		Party did not submit documents to the CEC
Revival of Agrarian Russia	VAR	Vasily Krylov	—	5 July 2016	Agrarianism	CEC refused to certify the list of candidates
Union of Labor	UL	Alexander Shershukov	Svetlana Antropova	21 June 2016		CEC refused to register the list of candidates
Volya	Volya	Svetlana Peunova	Marina Gerasimova	25 June and 2 July 2016	Left-wing nationalism / Democratic socialism / Narodniks	Party failed to submit the necessary signatures and as such will not be participating in the election

=== Single-member constituencies ===
In 225 single-member constituencies, candidates could be nominated by a party, or be self-nominated.

== Opinion polls ==
United Russia CPRF A Just Russia LDPR

== Exit polls ==
Date	Poll source	UR	CPRF	LDPR	JR	PARNAS	Yabloko	CPl	Rodina	PoR	Greens	PoG (Note: In opinion polls often found under the old name of "Right Cause")	CoR	RPPJ	CPo	Spoilt vote	Lead
18 September 2016	WCIOM	44.5%	14.9%	15.3%	8.1%	1.2%	3.5%	0.3%	2.3%	0.8%	0.8%	1.8%	2.6%	2%	0.2%	1.7%	29.2% over LDPR
18 September 2016	FOM	48.4%	16.3%	14.2%	7.6%	1%	3.2%	0.2%	1.8%	0.6%	0.8%	1.5%	1.5%	1.9%	0.1%	?	32.1% over CPRF

== Results ==
Seat composition before election: JR – 64, CPRF – 92, UR – 238, LDPR – 56

United Russia won a supermajority of seats, allowing them to change the Constitution without the votes of other parties. Turnout was reported as low. Throughout the day there were reports of voting fraud including video purporting to show officials stuffing ballot boxes. Additionally, results in many regions demonstrate that United Russia on many poll stations got anomalously close results, such as 62.2% in more than hundred poll stations in Saratov Oblast, suggesting that the results in these regions likely have been rigged. The government said there was no evidence of any large scale cheating. On 22 September, the Central Electoral Committee canceled the results in seven constituencies, where the number of used ballots exceeded the number of registered voters, or where the authorities were videotaped stuffing the ballots. According to research by University of Michigan political scientists Kirill Kalinin and Walter R. Mebane Jr., the election results are fraudulent.

Party	Party-list			Constituency			Total seats	+/–
Party	Votes	%	Seats	Votes	%	Seats	Total seats	+/–
United Russia	28,527,828	55.23	140	25,162,770	50.12	203	343	+105
Communist Party	7,019,752	13.59	35	6,492,145	12.93	7	42	−50
Liberal Democratic Party	6,917,063	13.39	34	5,064,794	10.09	5	39	−17
A Just Russia	3,275,053	6.34	16	5,017,645	10.00	7	23	−41
Communists of Russia	1,192,595	2.31	0	1,847,824	3.68	0	0	New
Yabloko	1,051,335	2.04	0	1,323,793	2.64	0	0	0
Russian Party of Pensioners for Justice	910,848	1.76	0				0	New
Rodina	792,226	1.53	0	1,241,642	2.47	1	1	New
Party of Growth	679,030	1.31	0	1,171,259	2.33	0	0	0
The Greens	399,429	0.77	0	770,076	1.53	0	0	New
People's Freedom Party	384,675	0.74	0	530,862	1.06	0	0	New
Patriots of Russia	310,015	0.60	0	704,197	1.40	0	0	0
Civic Platform	115,433	0.22	0	364,100	0.73	1	1	New
Civilian Power	73,971	0.14	0	79,922	0.16	0	0	New
Independents				429,051	0.85	1	1	+1
Total	51,649,253	100.00	225	50,200,080	100.00	225	450	0
Valid votes	51,649,253	98.13		50,200,080	96.60			
Invalid/blank votes	982,596	1.87		1,767,725	3.40			
Total votes	52,631,849	100.00		51,967,805	100.00			
Registered voters/turnout	110,061,200	47.82		109,636,794	47.40			
Source: Central Election Commission

=== By region ===
The breakdown of the party-list results by region is as follows:

Region	JR	CPl	CPo	CPRF	CoR	LDPR	PoG	PoR	PARNAS	Rodina	RPPJ	Greens	UR	Yabloko	Turnout	Invalid ballots
Adygea	4.83%	0.13%	0.10%	13.37%	2.23%	12.66%	0.69%	0.24%	0.33%	1.13%	1.35%	0.65%	59.45%	0.89%	53.9%	
Altai Krai	13.78%	0.15%	0.15%	17.25%	3.66%	19.82%	0.84%	0.30%	0.60%	1.15%	1.76%	0.71%	35.19%	2.03%	40.7%	
Altai Republic	4.10%	0.11%	0.14%	18.89%	2.69%	12.73%	0.52%	0.69%	0.94%	5.66%	1.36%	0.55%	48.81%	0.81%	45.1%	
Amur Oblast	4.15%	0.19%	0.17%	16.62%	2.49%	29.02%	0.63%	0.52%	0.45%	1.28%	2.54%	0.72%	37.91%	0.91%	42.4%	
Arkhangelsk Oblast	9.17%	0.17%	0.13%	12.78%	1.97%	19.73%	1.21%	0.45%	0.83%	1.62%	2.99%	0.86%	44.48%	2%	36.5%	
Astrakhan Oblast	17.56%	0.19%	0.17%	14.18%	3.31%	13.13%	0.89%	0.38%	0.73%	1.10%	1.57%	0.64%	42.22%	0.99%	36.9%	
Baikonur	2.42%	0.16%	0.14%	11.98%	1.65%	29.73%	0.79%	0.59%	0.70%	1.94%	2.70%	0.99%	42.64%	1.03%	43.1%	
Bashkortostan	6.88%	0.30%	0.14%	18.62%	1.84%	11.29%	0.36%	0.39%	0.21%	0.69%	0.99%	0.51%	56.37%	0.52%	69.7%	
Belgorod Oblast	7.01%	0.20%	0.12%	14.93%	1.94%	13.73%	0.67%	0.29%	0.44%	1.20%	1.73%	0.68%	54.73%	0.78%	62.1%	
Bryansk Oblast	3.48%	0.19%	0.10%	13.29%	1.83%	10.80%	0.54%	0.32%	0.38%	1.43%	1.26%	0.44%	63.91%	0.76%	55.1%	
Buryatia	6.55%	0.82%	0.14%	20.59%	2.87%	13.54%	3.90%	0.40%	0.52%	0.83%	2.19%	0.57%	43.34%	1.17%	40.5%	
Chechnya	1.12%	0.02%	0.07%	0.02%	0.96%	0.01%	0.16%	0.36%	0.01%	0.26%	0.11%	0.53%	96.29%	0.03%	94.9%	
Chelyabinsk Oblast	17.48%	0.2%	0.15%	12.02%	2.43%	16.73%	1.23%	0.48%	0.94%	1.80%	2.34%	1.07%	38.19%	2.14%	44.4%	
Chukotka	3.13%	0.19%	0.13%	7.76%	1.62%	17.34%	0.70%	0.48%	0.39%	1.21%	2.17%	0.81%	58.8%	0.80%	64.5%	
Chuvashia	10.69%	0.31%	0.18%	13.42%	1.94%	11.72%	0.77%	0.60%	0.63%	1.02%	2.78%	1.01%	50.92%	1.01%	59.3%	
Crimea (Note: Recognized by most members of the UN as part of Ukraine)	2.06%	0.20%	0.09%	5.60%	1.26%	11.14%	0.41%	0.26%	0.54%	1.39%	1.07%	0.69%	72.80%	0.68%	49.1%	
Dagestan	2.20%	0.07%	0.08%	5.35%	0.37%	0.52%	0.47%	0.53%	0.07%	0.32%	0.25%	0.17%	88.90%	0.15%	88.1%	
Ingushetia	9.57%	0.22%	0.54%	5.65%	0.20%	1.65%	2.14%	2.20%	0.06%	3.85%	0.11%	0.88%	72.41%	0.20%	81.4%	
Irkutsk Oblast	5.19%	0.30%	0.13%	24.08%	3.09%	17.01%	1.25%	0.87%	0.48%	1.46%	1.95%	0.89%	39.77%	1.43%	34.6%	
Ivanovo Oblast	7.31%	0.23%	0.10%	18.08%	3.07%	17.67%	1.09%	0.55%	0.94%	1.48%	2.53%	0.94%	42.38%	2.02%	38.5%	
Jewish Autonomous Oblast	2.80%	0.16%	0.14%	17.11%	3.31%	21.90%	0.65%	0.43%	0.45%	0.98%	1.94%	0.65%	45.03%	0.93%	39.6%	
Kabardino-Balkaria	2.09%	0.01%	0.01%	18.90%	0.11%	0.15%	0.24%	0.11%	0.01%	0.06%	0.02%	0.54%	77.71%	0.04%	90.1%	
Kaliningrad Oblast	5.62%	0.21%	0.14%	13.99%	2.76%	16.60%	2.30%	3.42%	1.04%	2.03%	2.21%	0.81%	43.39%	2.37%	44.0%	
Kalmykia	3.18%	0.27%	0.11%	11.69%	1.56%	4.29%	0.58%	2.31%	0.34%	0.50%	1.24%	0.42%	70.61%	1.42%	57.5%	
Kaluga Oblast	6.21%	0.17%	0.13%	15.95%	2.40%	17.38%	1.33%	0.60%	0.86%	1.87%	2.41%	0.91%	45.75%	2.21%	43.1%	
Kamchatka Krai	4.42%	0.22%	0.17%	12.59%	2.54%	21.31%	1.26%	0.74%	0.54%	1.42%	2.37%	0.98%	46.70%	1.40%	39.5%	
Karachay-Cherkessia	1.07%	0.10%	0.05%	7.97%	6.59%	0.64%	0.20%	0.65%	0.40%	0.20%	0.11%	0.10%	81.67%	0.40%	93.3%	
Karelia	10.09%	0.30%	0.13%	13.05%	2.56%	17.57%	1.66%	0.90%	0.82%	1.42%	2.32%	0.95%	37.30%	7.80%	39.6%	
Kemerovo Oblast	4.51%	0.10%	0.09%	7.21%	0.60%	7.72%	0.15%	0.49%	0.16%	0.23%	0.35%	0.17%	77.33%	0.44%	86.7%	
Khabarovsk Krai	4.52%	0.23%	0.17%	16.46%	3.31%	25.01%	1.11%	0.42%	1.13%	1.60%	2.99%	1.22%	37.31%	1.85%	36.9%	
Khakassia	7.17%	0.17%	0.14%	20.90%	3.49%	19.52%	0.86%	0.76%	0.70%	1.32%	2.09%	1.03%	38.06%	1.44%	39.4%	
Khanty-Mansi Autonomous Okrug	5.57%	0.22%	0.15%	9.69%	2.15%	22.31%	1.03%	0.59%	0.62%	2.25%	2.17%	0.77%	47.61%	1.13%	39.2%	
Kirov Oblast	9.46%	0.23%	0.16%	13.58%	2.64%	24.94%	1.40%	0.36%	0.56%	1.43%	2.38%	0.74%	37.96%	1.63%	41.9%	
Komi	8.82%	0.25%	0.22%	12.49%	3.67%	22.59%	1.23%	0.69%	0.85%	1.86%	3.51%	1.12%	37.85%	1.76%	40.7%	
Kostroma Oblast	8.05%	0.15%	0.10%	21.40%	3.17%	18.85%	1.32%	0.30%	0.81%	2.73%	2.32%	0.74%	36.56%	1.77%	39.4%	
Krasnodar Krai	3.69%	0.19%	0.14%	12.63%	1.98%	13.76%	1.21%	0.42%	0.54%	1.55%	1.62%	0.61%	59.30%	0.97%	51.2%	
Krasnoyarsk Krai	4.86%	0.26%	0.16%	14.41%	3.06%	20.26%	1.02%	5.13%	0.77%	1.84%	2.20%	1.15%	40.45%	1.57%	36.6%	
Kurgan Oblast	13.79%	0.14%	0.11%	14.56%	3.03%	18.83%	0.66%	0.42%	0.51%	1.40%	1.93%	0.60%	41.51%	0.96%	41.8%	
Kursk Oblast	4.55%	0.21%	0.13%	12.83%	3.55%	15.66%	0.74%	2.61%	0.55%	1.24%	1.62%	0.92%	51.70%	1.28%	47.0%	
Leningrad Oblast	9.61%	0.23%	0.14%	10.37%	2.22%	13.30%	2.46%	0.37%	0.95%	1.81%	2.13%	0.90%	50.04%	2.57%	44.1%	
Lipetsk Oblast	5.96%	0.15%	0.11%	13.68%	1.99%	12.33%	0.69%	0.45%	0.51%	1.80%	2.50%	0.49%	56.19%	1.20%	52.6%	
Magadan Oblast	7.72%	0.35%	0.10%	14.84%	2.74%	19.15%	1.22%	0.48%	0.64%	1.26%	2.51%	0.87%	44.69%	1.08%	40.5%	
Mari El	4.60%	0.21%	0.10%	27.28%	4.11%	10.44%	0.55%	0.24%	0.42%	0.96%	1.23%	0.60%	46.70%	0.86%	53.3%	
Mordovia	2.49%	0.06%	0.05%	5.16%	0.60%	5.19%	0.18%	0.20%	0.15%	0.29%	0.33%	0.14%	84.36%	0.31%	83.0%	
Moscow	6.54%	0.32%	0.25%	13.90%	1.97%	13.09%	3.55%	0.60%	2.62%	3.52%	2.93%	1.77%	37.76%	9.53%	35.2%	
Moscow Oblast	5.02%	0.25%	0.17%	15.24%	2.04%	14.89%	1.90%	0.62%	1.19%	2.57%	2.56%	1.34%	45.99%	3.45%	37.9%	
Murmansk Oblast	8.72%	1.13%	0.17%	11.13%	2.73%	19.97%	1.38%	0.41%	1.00%	1.79%	3.26%	1.09%	41.98%	2.28%	39.7%	
Nenets Autonomous Okrug	4.41%	0.21%	0.20%	18.45%	2.87%	21.80%	1.02%	0.51%	0.77%	2.22%	2.24%	1.08%	41.11%	1.23%	44.8%	
Nizhny Novgorod Oblast	5.11%	0.14%	0.12%	12.83%	2.26%	12.36%	0.94%	0.40%	0.68%	1.70%	1.69%	0.52%	58.15%	1.30%	44.4%	
North Ossetia	1.86%	0.05%	0.04%	22.18%	0.74%	1.75%	0.17%	3.92%	0.10%	0.98%	0.25%	0.22%	67.09%	0.15%	85.6%	
Novgorod Oblast	12.60%	0.25%	0.14%	15.67%	2.58%	16.18%	1.78%	0.42%	0.75%	1.34%	2.33%	0.81%	40.05%	2.81%	39.8%	
Novosibirsk Oblast	5.61%	0.26%	0.13%	19.55%	3.48%	19.55%	0.96%	0.37%	1.04%	3.13%	1.82%	0.84%	38.26%	2.30%	34.9%	
Omsk Oblast	6.24%	0.24%	0.16%	25.21%	4.55%	15.61%	1.98%	0.31%	0.74%	1.27%	1.72%	0.64%	36.32%	1.91%	38.7%	
Orenburg Oblast	5.39%	0.21%	0.13%	18.38%	3.08%	22.66%	1.02%	0.62%	0.60%	1.04%	1.68%	0.55%	40.85%	1.35%	41.6%	
Oryol Oblast	5.63%	0.24%	0.12%	17.86%	3.74%	15.33%	0.94%	0.38%	0.64%	1.13%	1.73%	0.75%	47.93%	1.10%	53.5%	
Penza Oblast	4.44%	0.12%	0.08%	12.48%	2.12%	10.02%	0.58%	0.24%	0.47%	0.89%	1.37%	0.47%	64.26%	1.03%	60.6%	
Perm Krai	9.02%	0.21%	0.16%	14.24%	3.36%	15.75%	1.74%	0.35%	0.86%	1.45%	2.24%	0.69%	42.65%	3.07%	35.1%	
Primorsky Krai	5.16%	0.21%	0.17%	17.95%	3.38%	19.66%	1.51%	0.45%	0.86%	1.87%	3.80%	0.82%	38.99%	1.79%	37.3%	
Pskov Oblast	7.27%	0.19%	0.18%	17.41%	2.59%	14.23%	1.18%	0.71%	0.53%	1.47%	2.17%	0.81%	45.15%	4.14%	42.1%	
Rostov Oblast	4.34%	0.20%	0.12%	13.60%	2.29%	12.49%	0.82%	0.34%	0.57%	1.53%	1.58%	0.58%	58.79%	1.18%	48.2%	
Ryazan Oblast	5.00%	0.18%	0.10%	13.99%	2.58%	14.99%	0.82%	0.30%	0.73%	1.49%	1.85%	0.72%	54.52%	1.34%	43.3%	
Saint Petersburg	6.90%	0.28%	0.31%	11.31%	1.23%	11.36%	8.52%	0.44%	2.18%	2.62%	2.19%	1.53%	39.71%	9.08%	32.5%	
Yakutia	15.20%	0.82%	0.16%	14.35%	3.14%	10.70%	0.73%	0.30%	0.49%	1.56%	2.34%	0.82%	46.42%	1.16%	48.1%	
Sakhalin Oblast	3.40%	0.21%	0.14%	15.44%	3.25%	20.03%	1.07%	0.59%	0.72%	1.72%	3.00%	0.90%	45.44%	1.74%	37.1%	
Samara Oblast	4.47%	0.51%	0.16%	15.94%	2.75%	14.27%	1.45%	0.36%	0.91%	1.33%	1.44%	0.86%	50.77%	1.99%	52.8%	
Saratov Oblast	4.22%	0.14%	0.18%	10.36%	2.06%	9.36%	0.59%	0.53%	0.36%	1.03%	0.76%	0.49%	68.17%	0.89%	64.4%	
Sevastopol (Note: Recognized by most members of the UN as part of Ukraine)	5.09%	0.12%	0.07%	12.07%	1.90%	15.36%	3.58%	0.30%	0.56%	2.29%	0.98%	0.78%	53.78%	0.65%	47.0%	
Smolensk Oblast	4.35%	0.20%	0.11%	15.82%	2.23%	19.42%	0.86%	0.59%	0.64%	1.38%	2.10%	0.72%	48.13%	1.33%	40.3%	
Stavropol Krai	4.34%	0.18%	0.15%	13.19%	2.67%	15.52%	1.02%	0.42%	0.52%	1.29%	1.72%	0.85%	54.26%	0.99%	42.0%	
Sverdlovsk Oblast	13.20%	0.35%	0.16%	11.88%	2.61%	16.54%	1.47%	0.50%	0.97%	1.57%	3.03%	1.25%	40.53%	2.90%	41.4%	
Tambov Oblast	3.89%	0.11%	0.09%	10.77%	1.76%	7.76%	0.42%	0.21%	0.39%	7.21%	0.94%	0.38%	63.51%	0.87%	49.2%	
Tatarstan	2.26%	0.12%	0.11%	4.07%	3.02%	2.25%	0.23%	0.20%	0.27%	0.41%	0.49%	0.20%	85.27%	0.55%	78.7%	
Tomsk Oblast	7.33%	0.20%	0.17%	12.58%	3.52%	20.46%	1.84%	0.50%	1.10%	1.45%	1.91%	1.55%	40.67%	3.71%	33.8%	
Tula Oblast	4.47%	0.17%	0.13%	14.41%	2.61%	14.28%	0.98%	0.32%	0.77%	1.79%	2.60%	0.99%	53.02%	1.76%	45.6%	
Tuva	4.35%	0.10%	0.09%	4.17%	1.15%	3.12%	0.23%	0.24%	0.47%	0.25%	0.94%	0.26%	82.61%	0.93%	89.7%	
Tver Oblast	9.61%	0.17%	0.14%	15.23%	2.18%	16.35%	1.07%	0.41%	0.79%	1.94%	2.26%	0.76%	45.00%	1.92%	41.6%	
Tyumen Oblast	11.45%	0.14%	0.11%	12.27%	0.50%	14.12%	0.25%	0.24%	0.20%	0.35%	0.53%	0.23%	58.35%	0.39%	81.1%	
Udmurtia	8.91%	0.31%	0.13%	13.93%	2.24%	12.28%	3.18%	0.67%	0.61%	1.15%	1.82%	0.62%	50.52%	1.19%	44.4%	
Ulyanovsk Oblast	3.34%	0.21%	0.12%	19.16%	3.24%	15.99%	1.81%	0.46%	0.61%	1.13%	1.89%	0.54%	48.46%	1.23%	52.3%	
Vladimir Oblast	7.61%	0.39%	0.15%	13.03%	3.37%	17.96%	1.25%	0.42%	0.84%	1.94%	3.04%	0.99%	45.20%	1.77%	38.4%	
Volgograd Oblast	5.61%	0.16%	0.11%	14.94%	2.53%	16.17%	0.88%	0.79%	0.73%	1.27%	1.82%	0.73%	50.64%	1.76%	42.1%	
Vologda Oblast	10.54%	0.23%	0.15%	13.87%	2.76%	21.40%	1.45%	0.40%	0.97%	1.40%	4.03%	1.00%	37.21%	2.43%	40.8%	
Voronezh Oblast	7.07%	0.12%	0.10%	15.59%	1.98%	9.25%	0.70%	0.54%	0.53%	1.48%	1.28%	0.56%	58.67%	0.97%	53.7%	
Yamalo-Nenets Autonomous Okrug	4.74%	0.28%	0.27%	6.86%	1.15%	14.02%	0.65%	0.46%	0.43%	0.73%	0.90%	0.49%	67.14%	0.67%	74.3%	
Yaroslavl Oblast	10.27%	0.28%	0.11%	16.04%	2.19%	17.36%	1.43%	0.59%	1.26%	2.50%	2.51%	1.46%	38.43%	3.77%	37.8%	
Zabaykalsky Krai	4.17%	0.35%	0.16%	15.93%	3.38%	26.40%	0.66%	0.81%	0.50%	1.19%	2.13%	0.78%	39.87%	0.82%	38.9%	
Total	6.23%	0.22%	0.14%	13.34%	2.27%	13.14%	1.29%	0.59%	0.73%	1.51%	1.73%	0.76%	54.19%	1.99%	47.8%	

Turnout (red) and United Russia vote (blue)

CPRF (red) vs LDPR (blue), percentage difference based on total number of registered voters

=== By constituency ===
Region	Total seats	Seats won						
Region	Total seats	UR	CPRF	LDPR	JR	Rodina	CPl	Ind.
Adygea	1	0	0	0	0	0	0	1
Altai Krai	4	4	0	0	0	0	0	0
Altai Republic	1	1	0	0	0	0	0	0
Amur Oblast	1	0	0	1	0	0	0	0
Arkhangelsk Oblast	2	2	0	0	0	0	0	0
Astrakhan Oblast	1	1	0	0	0	0	0	0
Bashkortostan	6	5	0	0	0	0	1	0
Belgorod Oblast	2	2	0	0	0	0	0	0
Bryansk Oblast	2	2	0	0	0	0	0	0
Buryatia	1	1	0	0	0	0	0	0
Chechnya	1	1	0	0	0	0	0	0
Chelyabinsk Oblast	5	5	0	0	0	0	0	0
Chukotka	1	1	0	0	0	0	0	0
Chuvashia	2	1	0	0	1	0	0	0
Republic of Crimea	3	3	0	0	0	0	0	0
Dagestan	3	3	0	0	0	0	0	0
Ingushetia	1	1	0	0	0	0	0	0
Irkutsk Oblast	4	3	0	0	0	1	0	0
Ivanovo Oblast	2	2	0	0	0	0	0	0
Jewish Autonomous Oblast	1	1	0	0	0	0	0	0
Kabardino-Balkaria	1	1	0	0	0	0	0	0
Kaliningrad Oblast	2	2	0	0	0	0	0	0
Kalmykia	1	1	0	0	0	0	0	0
Kaluga Oblast	2	2	0	0	0	0	0	0
Kamchatka Krai	1	1	0	0	0	0	0	0
Karachay-Cherkessia	1	1	0	0	0	0	0	0
Karelia	1	1	0	0	0	0	0	0
Kemerovo Oblast	4	4	0	0	0	0	0	0
Khabarovsk Krai	2	1	0	1	0	0	0	0
Khakassia	1	1	0	0	0	0	0	0
Khanty–Mansi Autonomous Okrug	2	2	0	0	0	0	0	0
Kirov Oblast	2	2	0	0	0	0	0	0
Komi Republic	1	1	0	0	0	0	0	0
Kostroma Oblast	1	1	0	0	0	0	0	0
Krasnodar Krai	8	7	1	0	0	0	0	0
Krasnoyarsk Krai	4	4	0	0	0	0	0	0
Kurgan Oblast	1	1	0	0	0	0	0	0
Kursk Oblast	2	2	0	0	0	0	0	0
Leningrad Oblast	3	3	0	0	0	0	0	0
Lipetsk Oblast	2	2	0	0	0	0	0	0
Magadan Oblast	1	1	0	0	0	0	0	0
Mari El	1	0	1	0	0	0	0	0
Mordovia	1	1	0	0	0	0	0	0
Moscow	15	13	1	0	1	0	0	0
Moscow Oblast	11	10	0	1	0	0	0	0
Murmansk Oblast	1	1	0	0	0	0	0	0
Nenets Autonomous Okrug	1	1	0	0	0	0	0	0
Nizhny Novgorod Oblast	5	5	0	0	0	0	0	0
North Ossetia–Alania	1	1	0	0	0	0	0	0
Novgorod Oblast	1	1	0	0	0	0	0	0
Novosibirsk Oblast	4	4	0	0	0	0	0	0
Omsk Oblast	3	2	1	0	0	0	0	0
Orenburg Oblast	3	3	0	0	0	0	0	0
Oryol Oblast	1	1	0	0	0	0	0	0
Penza Oblast	2	1	0	0	1	0	0	0
Perm Krai	4	4	0	0	0	0	0	0
Primorsky Krai	3	3	0	0	0	0	0	0
Pskov Oblast	1	1	0	0	0	0	0	0
Rostov Oblast	7	6	0	0	1	0	0	0
Ryazan Oblast	2	2	0	0	0	0	0	0
Saint Petersburg	8	6	1	0	1	0	0	0
Sakha	1	0	0	0	1	0	0	0
Sakhalin Oblast	1	1	0	0	0	0	0	0
Samara Oblast	5	5	0	0	0	0	0	0
Saratov Oblast	4	4	0	0	0	0	0	0
Sevastopol	1	1	0	0	0	0	0	0
Smolensk Oblast	2	2	0	0	0	0	0	0
Stavropol Krai	4	4	0	0	0	0	0	0
Sverdlovsk Oblast	7	7	0	0	0	0	0	0
Tambov Oblast	2	2	0	0	0	0	0	0
Tatarstan	6	6	0	0	0	0	0	0
Tomsk Oblast	2	1	0	1	0	0	0	0
Tula Oblast	2	2	0	0	0	0	0	0
Tuva	1	1	0	0	0	0	0	0
Tver Oblast	2	2	0	0	0	0	0	0
Tyumen Oblast	2	2	0	0	0	0	0	0
Udmurtia	2	2	0	0	0	0	0	0
Ulyanovsk Oblast	2	1	1	0	0	0	0	0
Vladimir Oblast	2	2	0	0	0	0	0	0
Volgograd Oblast	4	4	0	0	0	0	0	0
Vologda Oblast	2	2	0	0	0	0	0	0
Voronezh Oblast	4	3	0	0	0	0	0	0
Yamalo-Nenets Autonomous Okrug	1	1	0	0	0	0	0	0
Yaroslavl Oblast	2	1	0	0	1	0	0	0
Zabaykalsky Krai	2	1	0	1	0	0	0	0
Party list	225	140	35	34	16	0	0	0
Russia	450	343	42	39	23	1	1	1
Source: Central Election Commission
