= Rifat Shaykhutdinov =

Russian politician

Rifat Shaykhutdinov Member of Parliament
- Рифат Шайхутдинов
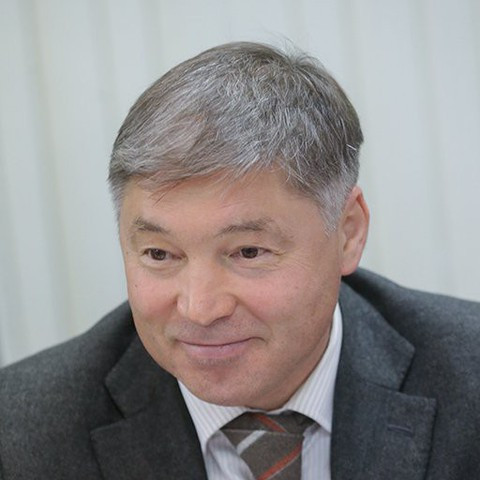
- Shaykhutdinov in 2018

Leader of the Civic Platform
- Incumbent
- Assumed office 17 April 2015
- Preceded by: Mikhail Prokhorov

Member of the State Duma for Bashkortostan
- Incumbent
- Assumed office 5 October 2016
- Preceded by: constituency established
- Constituency: Neftekamsk (No. 6)

Member of the State Duma (Party List Seat)
- In office 29 December 2003 – 21 December 2011

Personal details
- Born: Rifat Gabdulkhakovich Shaykhutdinov; 23 December 1963 (age 62) Okha, Russian SFSR, Soviet Union
- Party: Liberal Democratic Party (2003–2012); Civic Platform (2012–present)
- Spouse: Guzel Ismagilova
- Children: 6

Rifat Gabdulkhakovich Shaykhutdinov (Russian: Рифат Габдулхакович Шайхутдинов; born December 23, 1963) is a Russian politician. He currently serves as a member of the State Duma and the Chairman of the State Duma's Committee on Relations with CIS States and Compatriots, and Deputy Chairman of the State Duma's Committee on Power, Transport and Telecommunications. From 1992 to 1997 he was director of the Center for Experts in the Ministry of State Property in the Northwest Region.

An ethnic Tatar, Shaykhutdinov is a deputy for the Urals Federal District. He is also an author of a novel Political hunting that contains his works in relation to the political analysis of the social and political situation in Russia as well as worldwide. Shaykhutdinov is a father of two children, Anna (born in 1989) and Rod (born in 1992).
