= Optogan =

- Industry: LED
- Founded: 2004
- Products: LED chips Packaged LEDs; LED Matrixes (standard light engines consisting of surface mounted LEDs); Lumminaires
- Website: optogan.ru

The Optogan group is a former producer of high-brightness LED lights based in St. Petersburg, Russia. Optogan is also active in Finland and Germany. Founded in 2004 by three graduates of the Ioffe Physical-Technical Institute, Optogan is owned by various private and government investment funds.

== History ==
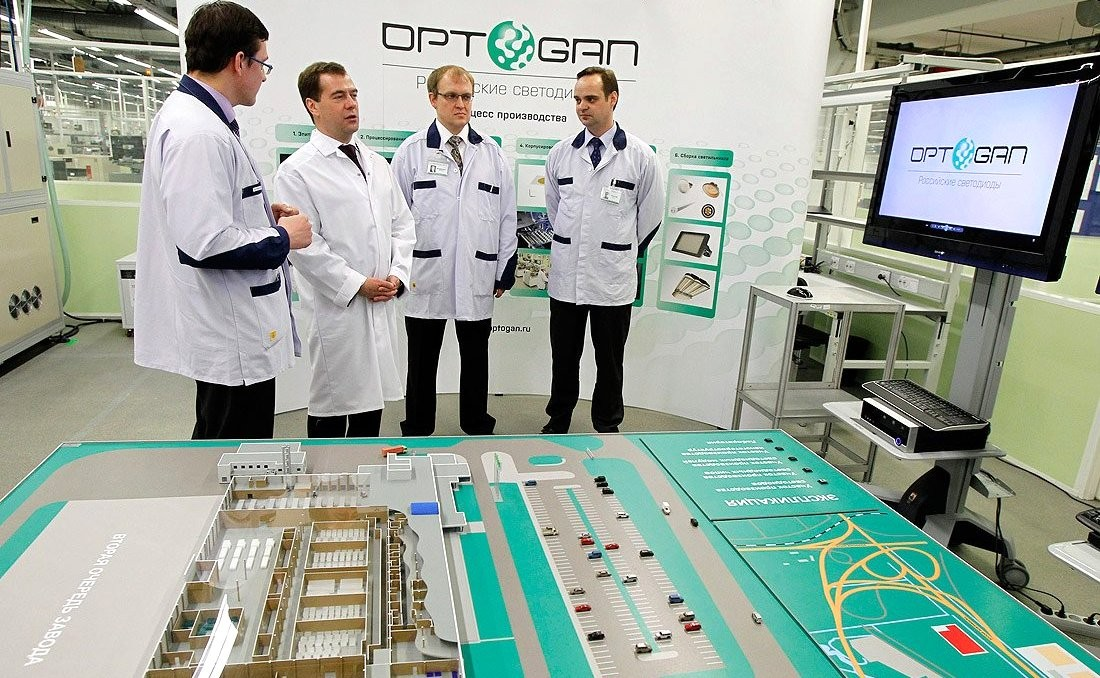
Dmitry Medvedev visited the company's plant in St. Petersburg. March 2011

Optogan was founded in 2004 in Espoo, Finland, by Maxim Odnoblyudov, Vladislav Bougrov, and Alexey Kovsh, graduates of the chair of Nobel Prize laureate Zhores Alferov. They have received several rounds of financing from various European venture capital investment funds. After the development stage, the company's research and development and pilot production line were expanded to the MST Factory site in Dortmund, Germany.

In 2008, the Russian private equity group ONEXIM acquired the company. In 2009, Russian government investment funds Rusnano and RIK joined Onexim as investors to develop a full-scale production facility for HB LEDs in the Strelna free-economic zone near St. Petersburg, Russia.

== Technology ==
Optogan has developed LEDs with gallium nitride. The Optogan chain of technologies includes semiconductor wafers by metal-organic chemical vapor deposition technique and LED chip design, packaging (including phosphor coating), and lens molding. The multichip LEDs were mounted on a printed circuit board.

Optogan technologies have a patented LED epilayer structure with enhanced light generation capability, with the f-PowerTM chip distributing over 300 A/cm^{2}. The LEDs can output as high as 110 lm/W. Optogan intellectual property and technologies are covered by over 35 patents.
