= Irina Prokhorova =

Russian historian & critic (born 1956)

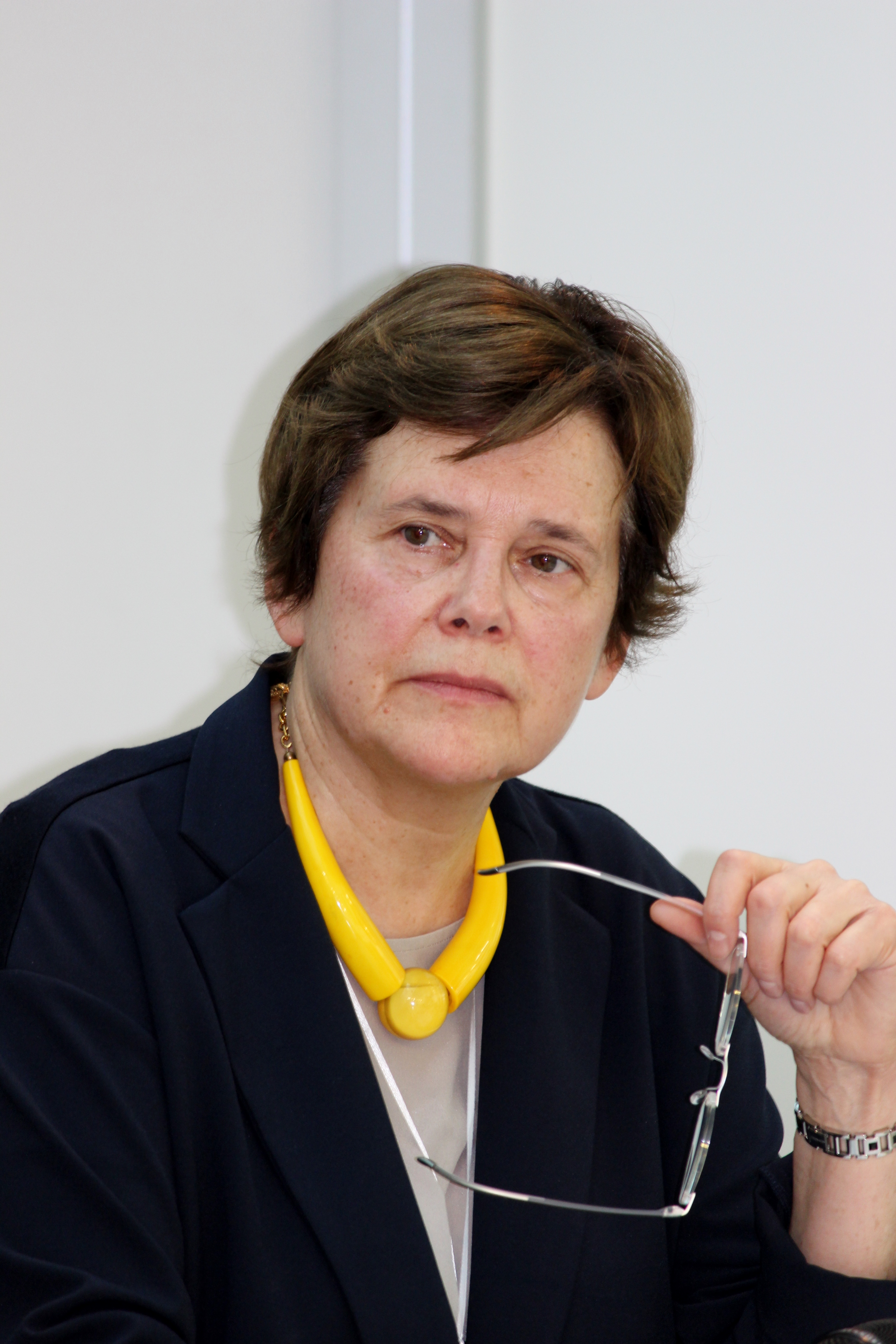
- Prokhorova in March 2021
- Born: Irina Dmitrievna Prokhorova; 3 March 1956 (age 70); Moscow, Russia
- Occupations: Literary critic, philologist, publisher
- Known for: New Literary Observer
- Irina Prokhorova's voice From the Echo of Moscow program, 8 April 2013

Irina Dmitrievna Prokhorova (Russian: Ирина Дмитриевна Прохорова; Born 3 March 1956) is a Russian philologist, literary critic and cultural historian, chief editor of the New Literary Observer publishing house and of the literature academic journal of the same name, co-founder of the Mikhail Prokhorov Charitable Foundation. In 2012, she helped her billionaire brother Mikhail Prokhorov in his presidential run, heading his political party Civic Platform from 2013 to 2014.

== Biography ==
=== Family and early years ===
Irina was born in Moscow to Tamara and Dmitri Prokhorov. Dmitri handled international relations for the Soviet Committee of Physical Culture and Sport, while Tamara was a materials engineer at the Institute for Chemical Machine-Building.

Irina entered the English and American Literature Department of the Moscow State University, in 1986 she defended her PhD thesis on English modernism.

=== Career ===
Upon graduation, Prokhorova started working on TV, she translated fiction and literary criticism, and as a publicist wrote for literary magazines. At the same time she worked as an English teacher. As recalled by her daughter, late 1980s were hard for Irina because she was a single mother who worked a lot and had to single-handedly care for her elderly gravely ill parents.

In 1992 Prokhorova founded the ‘New Literary Observer’ (NLO) literature magazine followed by a publishing house of the same name. The democratization of Russian society was in its prime then and the magazine was free to publish any materials without censorship, however, philology and humanitarian sciences were in decline due to acute economic crisis and no state support. Prokhorova confessed in later interviews, that even her close friends didn't believe that an academic journal on literature would survive in the 1990s Russia The publishing house released its first book in 1994, it was the ‘Literature as a Social Institution’ by Boris Dubin and Leo Gudkov. As recalled by Prokhorova, she established the publishing house because she needed funds for the magazine. Under those circumstances, a thick scientific magazine about literature couldn't survive without cash infusions. In 1993 NLO founded an annual literature conference ‘Bannye Readings’, named after the Banny lane in Moscow, where the conference took place. By 2016 NLO was publishing more than 100 books yearly, it grew into one of the most influential centers of liberal thought in Russia and released books of the authors who would otherwise be banned by censorship.

In 1996 Irina Prokhorova was invited to head the Russian Booker Prize jury.

In 2006 NLO opened a new magazine ‘Fashion Theory: The Journal of Dress, Body & Culture’, the first one in Russia with an academic approach to fashion. Ludmila Alyabyeva was appointed editor-in-chief.

The NLO third project, the ‘Neprikosnovennyi Zapas’ (Emergency Reserve) magazine, was launched in 1998. The publication features a multidisciplinary approach and offers space to experts of all humanitarian disciplines.

In 2004 Irina and her brother co-founded the Mikhail Prokhorov Charitable Foundation aimed to support Russian cultural institutions. At first, the fund supported culture and civil society in the Norilsk region. In 2009 the fund established the NOS Literary Prize. The award is given for traditional or experimental proze works, published in Russian, winners and finalists are chosen every year during the open debate. The Foundation also established the Krasnoyarsk Book Culture Fair, and a grant competition ‘New Role of Libraries in Education’. Prokhorov Fund supported the Unknown Siberia Festival in France. In 2013 Prokhorova's daughter Irina became executive director of the family foundation.

In 2012-2015 Prokhorova hosted her own radio program ‘Culture of Everyday’ on Komsomolskaya Pravda radio station. In 2012-2017 she also hosted ‘Irina Prokhorova. Value System’ show on RBC TV channel.

=== Political activism ===
Irina supported her brother Mikhail Prokhorov in a presidential race he joined in 2012. She grew famous when she defeated Nikita Mikhalkov in a public debate. Mikhalkov, who represented Vladimir Putin at the debate, said in the end that he would gladly vote for Irina Prokhorova himself if she were going for presidency. Irina headed Prokhorov's political party Civic Platform in December 2013 - July 2014. She condemned the Russian Annexation of Crimea in 2014 and left the party, because 37 of its regional departments supported the Annexation.

In 2012 she refused an offer from the authorities to become Chair of the Public Council of the Ministry of Culture.

Prokhorova supports multiple civic initiatives, she publicly condemned the Dima Yakovlev Law, and opposed the 2022 Russian Invasion of Ukraine. Despite her anti-war stance, massive exodus of liberals from Russia and her own brother's emigration to Israel, Prokhorova refuses to leave and abandon her publishing house.

== Awards ==
- Russian State Award for Literature and Art for NLO Magazine (2002);
- Liberty Prize (2003);
- Chevalier de l’Ordre des Arts et des Lettres (2005);
- Andrei Bely Prize for literature (2006);
- Chevalier de la Légion d’Honneur (2012);
- Philanthropist of the Year (2013);
- Honorary Doctorate from the University of Sheffield (2016).

== Sources ==
- Marsh, Rosalind J. (2007). Literature, History and Identity in Post-Soviet Russia, 1991-2006. Bern: Peter Lang. ISBN 978-3-03911-069-8.
