= Dmitry Razumov =

Russian businessman

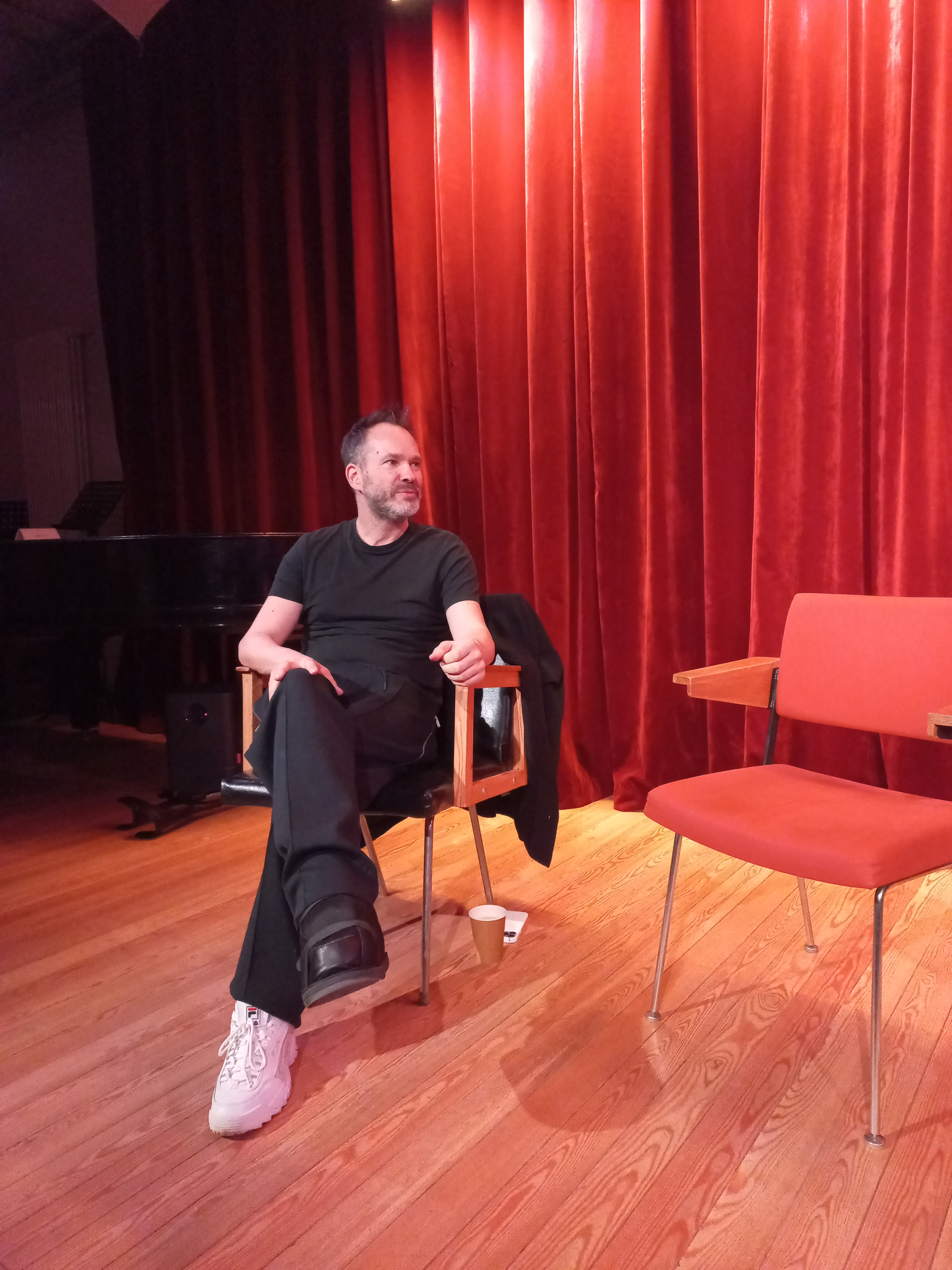
- Photo of Dmitry Razumov

Personal details
- Born: 7 February 1975 (age 51) Moscow, RSFSR, Soviet Union
- Spouse: Married
- Children: 3
- Education: Moscow State Institute of Foreign Relations
- Occupation: Businessman
- Known for: CEO of Onexim Group

Dmitry Valerievich Razumov (Russian: Дмитрий Валерьевич Разумов, born 7 February 1975) is a Russian businessman, manager and philanthropist, CEO of Prokhorov's Onexim Group, former chairman of the Brooklyn Nets and Barclays Center board of directors.

== Early life ==
Dmitry Razumov is a graduate of the Moscow State Institute of Foreign Relations, with a degree in international law. From 1994 to 1997, he practiced corporate law at Clifford Chance. In 1997, he became deputy head of investment banking at Renaissance Capital, following which, in 1999, he co-founded telecom-focused advisory and venture capital firm LV Finance.

== Norilsk Nickel and Onexim Group ==
From 2001 to 2005, during his tenure as deputy general director at Norilsk Nickel, Dmitry was responsible for the company's strategic development and M&A. Since May 2007, Dmitry has been CEO at Onexim Group. He became "Prokhorov's most trusted advisor".

During his career, Razumov served on the boards of directors at various companies, namely - Rusal, Norilsk Nickel, Megafon, OPIN, RBK, Polyus Gold, Uralkali, Renaissance Capital, Renaissance Financial Holdings, Soglasiye Insurance, etc. From 2014 to 2019, he was chairman of the board at Brooklyn Nets and Barclays Center. In 2013–2016, Razumov took 4th-7th positions in the Forbes lists of the "most expensive" executives in Russia.

=== International projects ===
In 2009–2010, Razumov led the acquisition by Onexim Sports and Entertainment of an 80% interest in the Brooklyn Nets and 45% interest in the then to-be-built Barclays Center. In 2016, Onexim became the 100% equity owner of the both.

Razumov worked to increase the value of the team and subsequently organized its sale in 2017–2019. The relocation of the Nets to Brooklyn for the 2012–2013 season marked the return of major league sports to Brooklyn. Along with the opening of Barclays Center it made the neighborhood more valuable. In 2017, Onexim had agreed to sell the 49 percent of the Brooklyn Nets to Taiwanese-Canadian businessman Joseph Tsai. In 2019, Joe Tsai acquired the remaining 51% of the Brooklyn Nets and acquired 100% of Barclays Center with an aggregate team and arena value nearing $3.5 billion. According to Dmitry Razumov, who led the negotiations, Prokhorov's investment was less than $1.5 billion, and overall profit was estimated by Forbes at least $2 billion.

In 2017, Onexim Sports and Entertainment, under Razumov's direction, completed a $165 million renovation of the Nassau Coliseum, and, in 2019, finished renovation of Webster Hall (both in New York). Nassau Coliseum is the home of Long Island Nets and New York Riptide, it hosts shows of Feld Entertainment

== Philanthropy ==
Since 2022, Dmitry has been the Director of Myra culture development non profit institution. Myra Center, created by Razumov in Suzdal, features an acoustic hall, library, exhibit space, recording studio and a courtyard specifically designed to house public events. The institution supports Fomikha Village Theater of Drama and Comedy. The building of the Myra Museum is under construction, it will host a collection of artworks from the Russian avant-garde to contemporary art. Also the nearby building of the former Zapolitzy hydroelectric power station will be reconstructed and turned into a cultural and historical center.
