= Agidel =

Town in Bashkortostan, Russia

Agidel Агидель
- Town

Other transcription(s)
  - Bashkir: Ағиҙел; Ağiźel
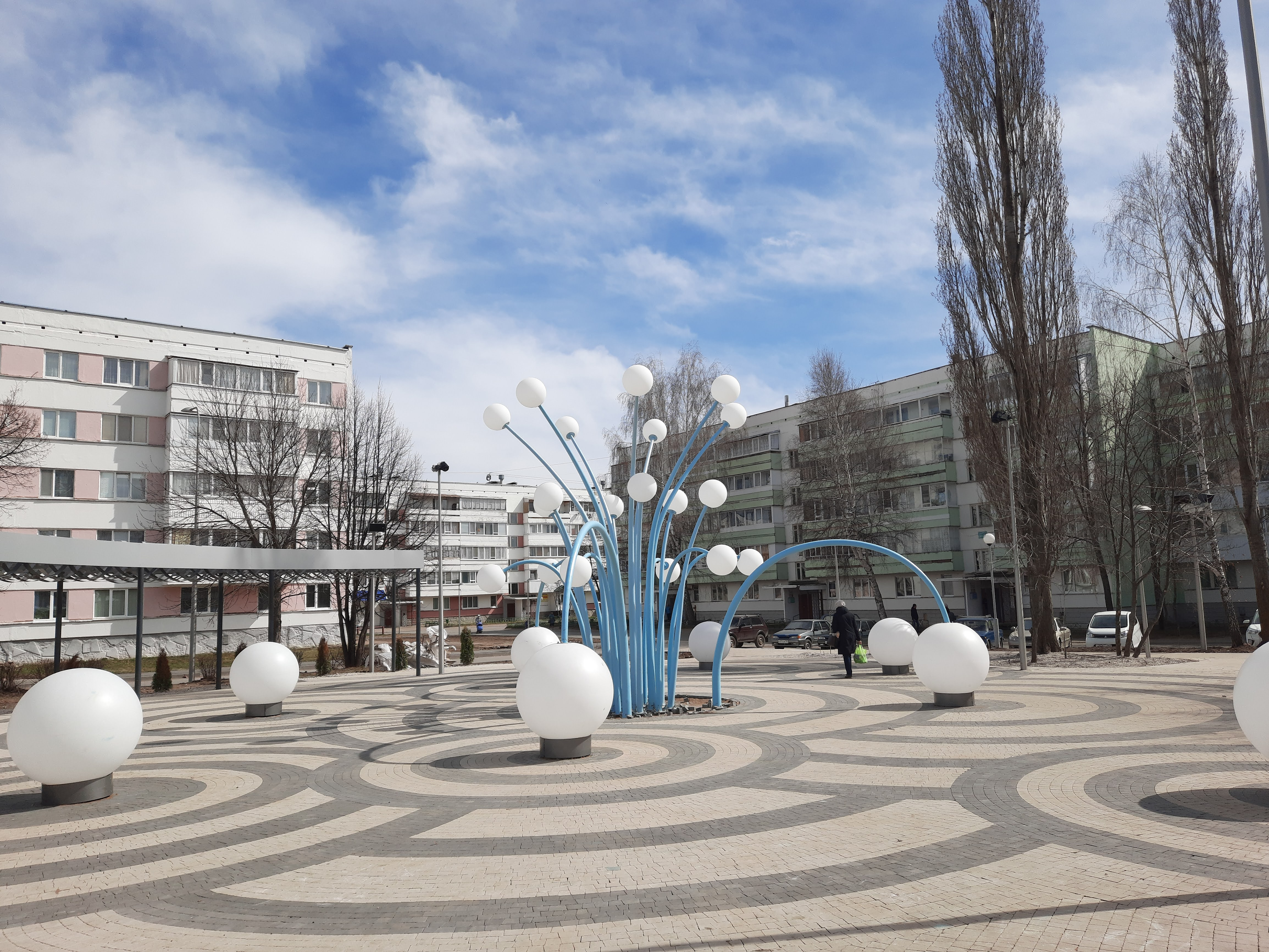

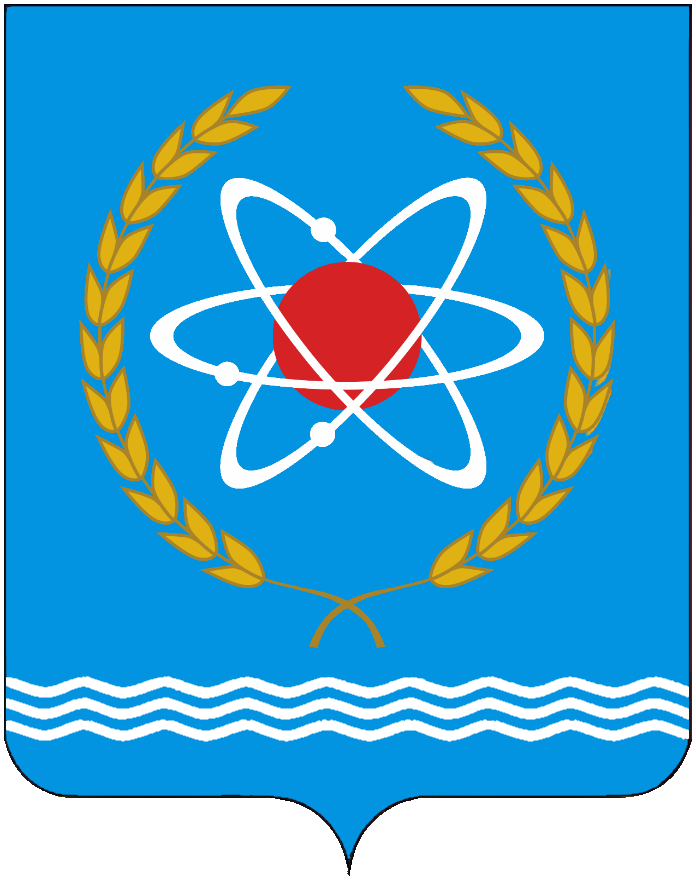
- Flag Coat of arms
- Interactive map of Agidel
- Location of Agidel Agidel (Bashkortostan)
- Coordinates: 55°54′N 53°56′E
- Country: Russia
- Federal subject: Bashkortostan
- Founded: 1980
- Town status since: 1991

Government
  - Leader: Oleg Krysin
- Elevation: 80 m (260 ft)

Population (2010 Census)
  - Total: 16,370
  - Estimate (2021): 14,219 (−13.1%)

Administrative status
  - Subordinated to: town of republic significance of Agidel
  - Capital of: town of republic significance of Agidel

Municipal status
  - Urban okrug: Agidel Urban Okrug
  - Capital of: Agidel Urban Okrug
- Time zone: UTC+5 (MSK+2)
- Postal code: 452920
- OKTMO ID: 80703000001

Agidel (Russian: Агиде́ль; Bashkir: Ағиҙел, Ağiźel) is a town in the Republic of Bashkortostan, Russia, located near the border with the Republic of Tatarstan. Population: 13,489 (2026); 16,370 (2010 census); 18,721 (2002 census); 16,067 (1989 Soviet census).

Historical population
Year	Pop.	±%
1989	16,067	—
2002	18,721	+16.5%
2010	16,370	−12.6%
2021	14,219	−13.1%
Source: Census data

== Etymology ==
The name of the town is derived from the Bashkir name of the Belaya (White) River: "Aghidhel", a tributary of the Kama River, near the confluence of which the town is located.

== History ==
It was founded in 1980 as a settlement supporting the construction of the Bashkir nuclear power plant. It was granted town status in 1991.

== Administrative and municipal status ==
Within the framework of administrative divisions, it is incorporated as the town of republic significance of Agidel—an administrative unit with the status equal to that of the districts. As a municipal division, the town of republic significance of Agidel is incorporated as Agidel Urban Okrug.

== Government ==
As of 2010, the head of the town's administration is Oleg Krysin.

== Economy ==
Since the Chernobyl disaster, the people across entire Russia have been strongly opposed to construction of a nuclear plant in northwestern Bashkortostan.

In September 2010, the regional government of Bashkortostan announced plans about establishing an industrial park in Agidel that would promote local manufacturing of construction materials.
