= Mikhail Prokhorov =

Russian entrepreneur and politician (born 1965)

- Михаил Прохоров
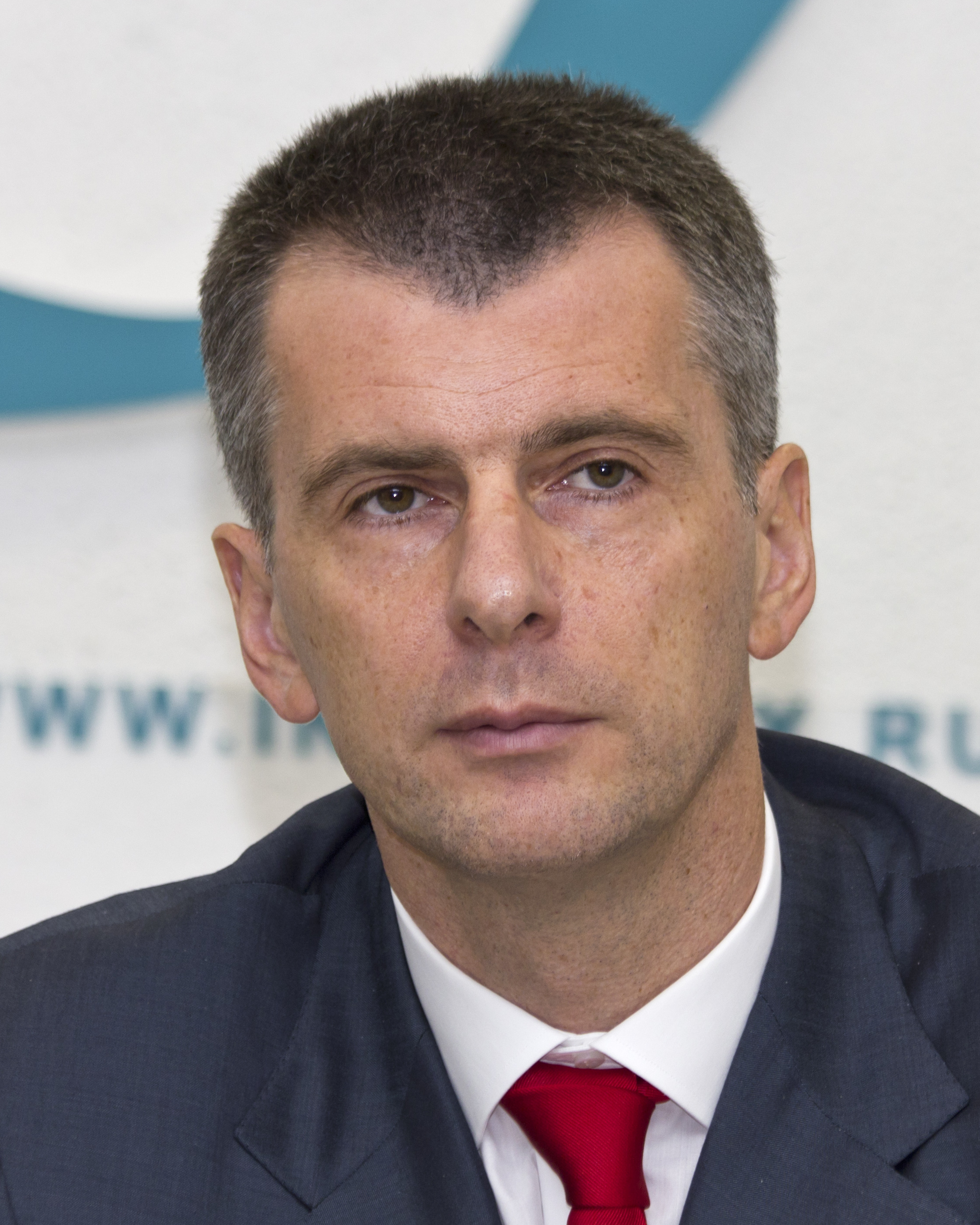
- Prokhorov in 2013
- Born: Mikhail Dmitrievich Prokhorov; 3 May 1965 (age 61); Moscow, Russian SFSR, Soviet Union
- Citizenship: Russia, Israel
- Education: Moscow Finance Institute
- Occupations: Businessman, Politician
- Known for: Owner of the ONEXIM Group and the Brooklyn Nets (2010–2019)
- Height: 6 ft 8 in (2.03 m)
- Political party: CPSU (1988–91); Right Cause (2011); Civic Platform (2012–15)
- Awards: Order of Friendship; Legion of Honour (Chevalier)
- Mikhail Prokhorov's voice Speaking on the Echo of Moscow radio program Recorded 2 September 2013

Signature
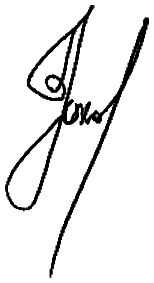

Mikhail Dmitrievich Prokhorov (Russian: Михаил Дмитриевич Прохоров; born 3 May 1965) is a Russian-Israeli oligarch and politician. He formerly owned the Brooklyn Nets.

After the collapse of the Soviet Union, Prokhorov obtained Russian state-owned metals assets at prices far below market value in Russia's controversial loans-for-shares privatization program. His company, Norilsk Nickel, became the world's largest producer of nickel and palladium. He is the former chairman of Polyus Gold, Russia's largest gold producer, and the former President of Onexim Group. As of December 1, 2021, Bloomberg Billionaires Index estimates his wealth at US$14.0 billion and has named him the 148th richest person in the world, while Forbes Magazine lists his wealth at US$11.5 billion and the 193rd richest person in the world.

In 2011, Prokhorov ran as an independent candidate in the 2012 Russian presidential election. He was third in voting, amassing 7.98 percent of the total vote. In June 2012, he declared the establishment of the new Russian political party called Civic Platform.

In April 2022, Prokhorov immigrated to Israel and received Israeli citizenship under the Law of Return.

== Early life ==
Prokhorov was born in Moscow to Tamara and Dmitri Prokhorov. On his paternal side, his grandparents were Russians, relatively wealthy peasant farmers (known as kulaks) who were persecuted as class enemies under the Bolsheviks and again under Stalin. His father, one of eight children, grew up poor, after his family "lost everything and was forced to flee from one part of Siberia and restart life in another". He has one sibling, an elder sister, Irina. On his maternal side his grandfather was Russian, and his grandmother Anna Belkina, was a Jewish microbiologist who remained in Moscow during World War II to make vaccines while her daughter Tamara was moved east to safety.

Dmitri Prokhorov was trained as a lawyer and handled international relations for the Soviet Committee of Physical Culture and Sport. Tamara Prokhorova was a materials engineer at the Institute for Chemical Machine-Building. As part of his job, Dmitri Prokhorov had the opportunity to travel abroad. His wife worked as an engineer for a research group at the institute specializing in plastics. They died within a year of each other, both from heart disease when they were in their late 50s. Mikhail Prokhorov's sister, Irina, who "runs his philanthropic organizations, an erudite literary magazine, and a publishing house ... lives in a wing of his mansion west of Moscow".

In 1989, he graduated from the Moscow Finance Institute. From 1989 to 1992, he worked in a management position at the International Bank for Economic Cooperation. Thereafter, he shortly served as head of management board of the MFK bank (International Finance Company, Russian: «Международная финансовая компания», МФК) and then in 1993 the newly formed United Export-Import Bank (Russian: "ОНЭКСИМ-банк") (Uneximbank; akas: Onexim Bank; Oneksimbank), with Alexander Khloponin, a friend from college, and Vladimir Potanin, to whom he was introduced by Khloponin and who became his business partner. Oneksimbank is the financial twin of MFK and was also known as the ONEKSIMbank-MFK banking group which was also close to Andrey Vavilov.

== Business career ==
In 1992, at the age of 27, Prokhorov partnered with Potanin to run Interros, a holding company that they used in 1995 to effect the purchase of Norilsk Nickel, one of Russia's largest nickel and palladium mining and smelting companies. During the largely un-regulated privatization of former state-controlled industries after the collapse of the USSR, Prokhorov and Potanin (the latter by then a deputy prime minister who oversaw privatization) were able acquire the shares from the workers of Norilsk Nickel for a fraction of their estimated market value and seize ownership of the company. When he departed in 2007, Prokhorov's share of the company was worth US$7.5 billion.

Prokhorov's first major financial success came at MFK, which became a depository institution for the government. The bank acquired Soviet assets in the amount of US$300 to US$400 million. Prokhorov held the post of chairman of the board from 1992 until 1993. In 1993, Prokhorov became the chairman of the board for Potanin's Onexim Bank, which, in 1993, became the paying agent for Finance Ministry bonds and a servicing bank for the City of Moscow's external economic activities. In May 1994, Onexim Bank focused on large clients in foreign economic activity especially in the sectors of oil and gas, chemical and metallurgical industries. In 1994, Onexim became the depository and paying agent for Russian Treasury obligations, and in 1995, it became the authorized bank for the federal agency dealing with bankrupt enterprises.

Banks holding government funds earned handsome fees and paid minimal interest at a time when inflation was in the triple digits.

In the 1990s, the Russian government needed loans to operate. Prokhorov partnered with Potanin. Their Onexim bank ran auctions for the government, in which bidders won the right to loan the Russian government money. Onexim and its affiliates were the winning bidders at the Norilsk Nickel and other auctions they conducted. The Russian government secured the loans with blocks of shares of the newly privatized state enterprises. The government never repaid the loans, and, as a result, Onexim received ownership of the collateral, which was the shares in the privatized enterprises.

When cash privatization eventually replaced the failing voucher privatization phase, the government came up with a scheme to leverage the privatization process and quickly raise money for its cash-strapped operations. Under the "loans for shares" program, the administration sold off majority stakes in some of its prized companies in the energy, telecommunications, and metallurgical sectors in exchange for loans taken from the new private sector banks owned by rich businessmen. According to the terms of the loan, the lender could stake equity ownership in the company if the government failed to repay the loans by September 1996. Auctions conducted under the "loans for shares" program were executed in such a way that only the few businessmen who owned these banks were allowed to partake in auctions. Following these bogus auctions, the majority stakes in some of the biggest Russian companies were acquired by a small number of major banks at abysmally low prices. These businessmen also bankrolled Yeltsin's 1996 presidential election victory, exerting their influence over the then president.

Onexim purchased Sidanko, which was a part of the Novolipetsk metallurgical industrial complex, and also the Novorossiisk marine shipping company and a large share of the Northwest marine shipping company.

In April 1996, Prokhorov was appointed to the Board of Directors of Norilsk Nickel (which then still belonged to the state). In November 1995, Onexim Bank won 38% of Norilsk Nickel in a loans-for-shares auction for US$170.1 million, US$100,000 (or less than 1%) higher than the bid starting price. At the time, Norilsk produced 25% of the world's nickel output.

Onexim managed the Norilsk Nickel auction, with a reservation price of US$170 million. It arranged three bids from affiliates, all at US$170 or US$170.1 million. Rossiiski Kredit Bank offered US$355 million, more than twice the starting amount. However, Onexim disqualified Rossiiski Kredit's bid on the basis that the bid amount exceeded Rossiiski Kredit's charter capital (the nominal value of its outstanding shares). The auction rules required Onexim to provide any objections in advance of the auction, to give bidders time to cure them. None of the submitted bids even closely approximated the market value of Norilsk Nickel, which had annual profits of around US$400 million.

60 Minutes, the American news program, interviewed Prokhorov. The program alleged that:

"Kremlin leaders gave him what amounts to an insiders opportunity to buy one of the state's most valuable assets. It was acquired from the Kremlin in a so-called auction for the measly sum of a few hundred million dollars in a process that even Prokhorov's business partner admits wasn't perfect, and probably not even legal under Western standards. But it was legal in Russia".

During the interview, Russian business correspondent Yulia Latynina stated about the auction of Norilsk Nickel, "Yes, it was rigged. But, it cannot be explained in normal economic terms to an outsider, especially an American. You had robber barons, we have oligarchs."

In December 2011, Prokhorov capped a year of higher-profile political activity in Russia with the December declaration that he would run as an independent in the 2012 presidential elections. He took third place in these elections with 7.98% of the vote. In June 2012, he declared the establishment of a new political party called the “Party of Civic Platform”. He resigned his positions as Chairman of Polyus Gold and President of the ONEXIM Group to enter politics in June 2011.

In August 2017, Prokhorov agreed to sell 7% of Rusal to fellow billionaire Viktor Vekselberg for $503.9 million. Talks between the two had stalled earlier in the year with Prokhorov selling 3.3% via an accelerated bookbinding.

In October 2017, Prokhorov and Viktor Vekselberg sold 3% of Rusal for $315 million in an accelerated bookbuilding. The sale of Prokhorov's 0,7% reduced his stake in the company to 6%.

=== Norilsk Nickel ===
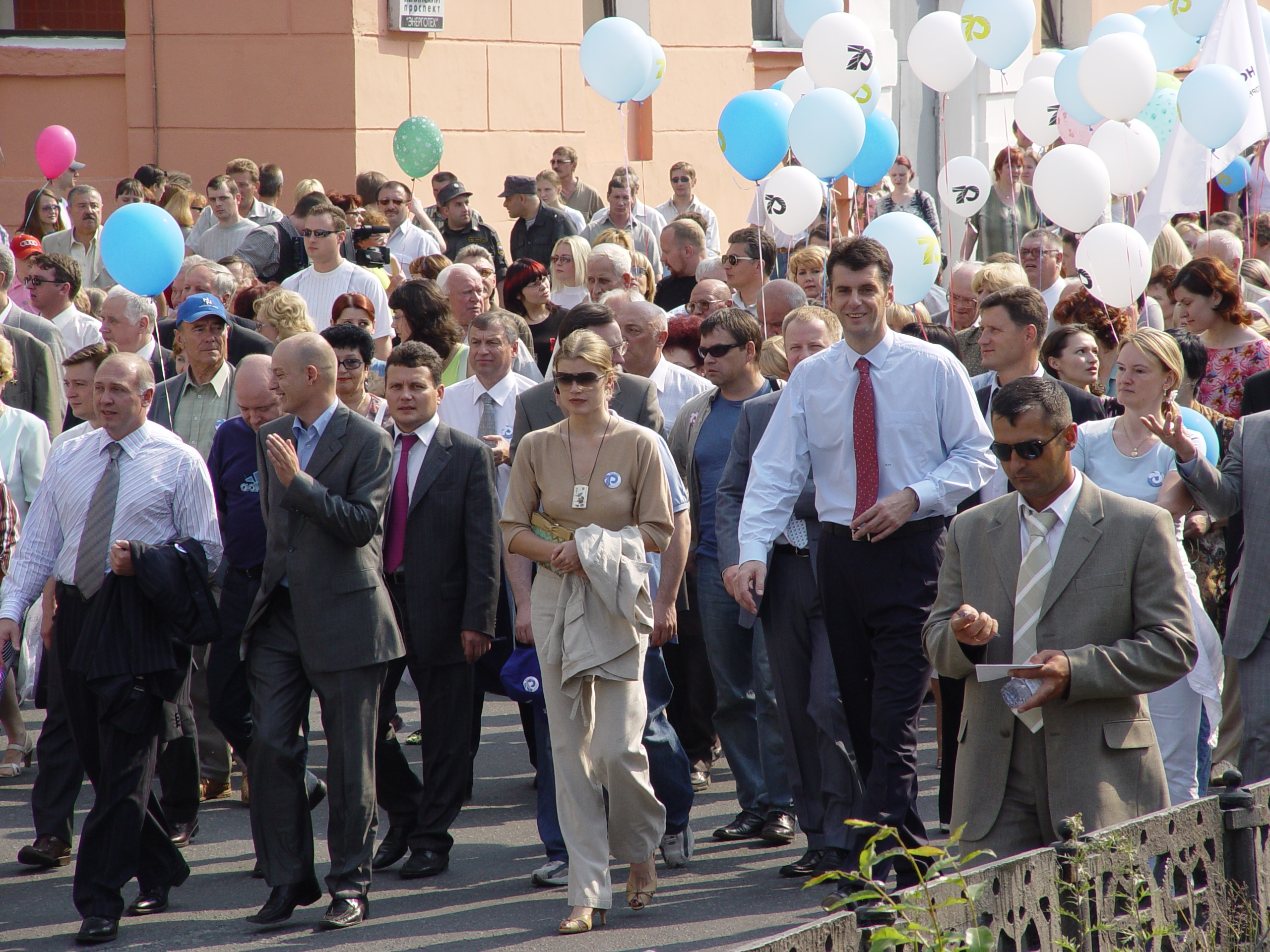
Mikhail Prokhorov (right-center, wearing red tie)

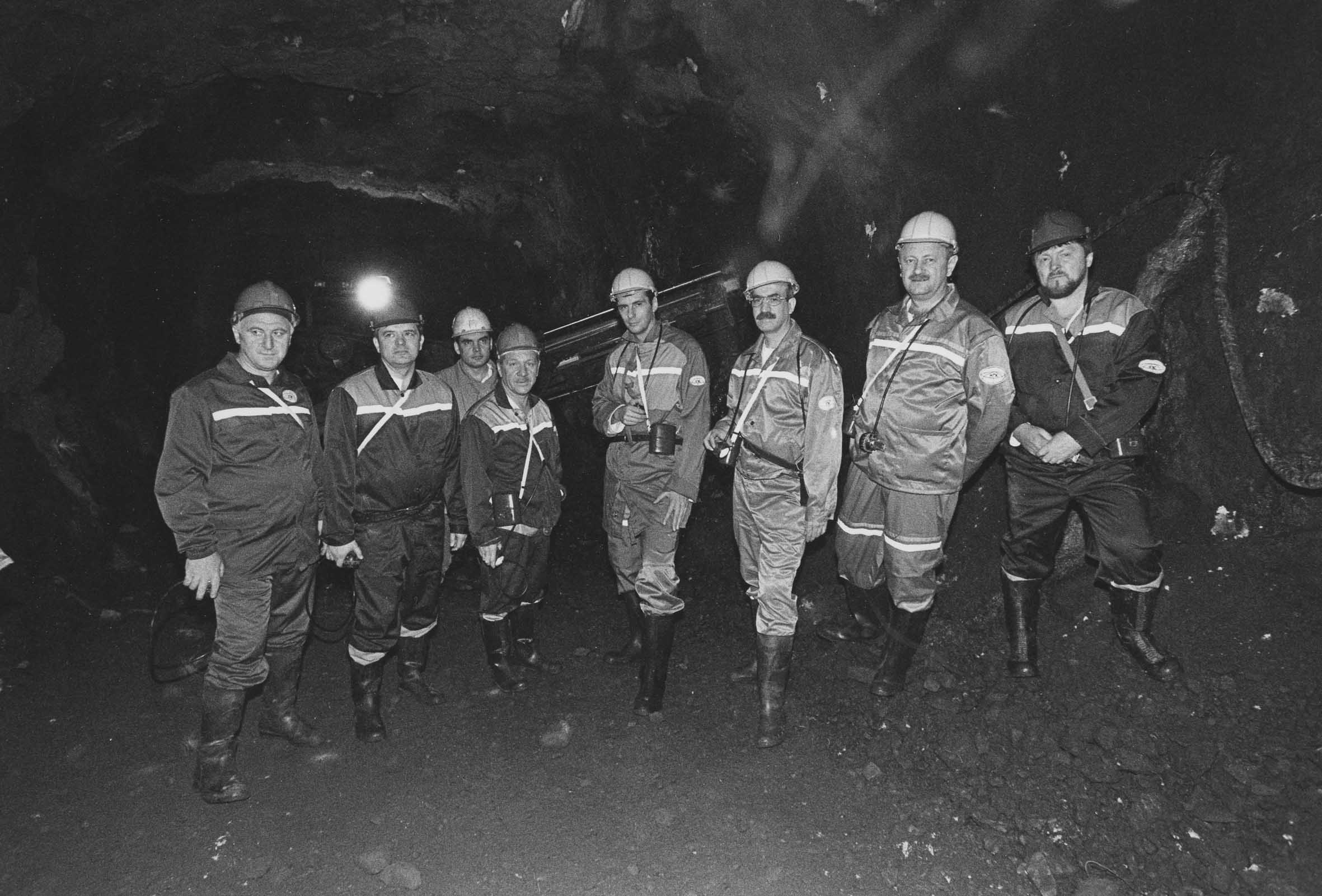
Mikhail Prokhorov (center)

After selling off most of Norilsk's non-mining assets, Prokhorov moved to modernize a highly complex mining operation which required icebreakers to transport metal over the frozen Arctic region. Prokhorov invested in an innovative Finnish freighter that did not require icebreakers. Norilsk Nickel is headquartered in Moscow. Environmental and labor conditions are harsh, and pollution remains a problem; Prokhorov has invested heavily in pollution control. However, despite these efforts, the mining areas continue to suffer from a high level of pollution. He converted Norilsk's gold-mining interests into the US$8.5 billion corporation Polyus Gold, Russia's largest gold producer. In 2003, he oversaw the acquisition of Stillwater Mining, his first international venture. He resigned as Norilsk CEO in February 2007 and declared his intention to separate his assets from those of long-time partner Vladimir Potanin. The two engaged in protracted negotiations to separate the conglomerate Interros, which the duo co-owned since the 1990s, into separate holdings.

=== ONEXIM Group ===
In May 2007, following the decision to exit Interros, Prokhorov launched the private investment fund ONEXIM Group, with assets valued at US$17 billion at the time. As the separation from Interros proceeded, and as other industries caught Prokhorov's attention, the group rapidly changed its investment profile. In April 2008, Prokhorov sold his 25% plus two shares stake in Norilsk Nickel to United Company RUSAL, another mining conglomerate controlled by his fellow billionaire Oleg Deripaska, in exchange for some 14% of Rusal stock, about US$5 billion in cash, and additional payment obligations of US$2 billion. The deal has been singled out as a major success for Prokhorov as only three months later, following a dip in oil prices, a disastrous stock market crash halved the value of most Russian companies, including Norilsk. He emerged as one of the very few businessmen to have cashed out in time. However, his wealth has also been affected, as the value of his remaining interests in various companies (including Rusal and Open Investments) declined sharply, and as the remaining payment from Rusal had to be postponed but has since been fully paid.

In September 2008, ONEXIM Group acquired 50% of Renaissance Capital, a major Russian investment bank which has reportedly encountered liquidity problems. ONEXIM purchased a small bank, renaming it IFC (for the bank which Prokhorov had run in the early 1990s). One of ONEXIM Group's divisions focuses on the development of nanotechnology investing in high-technology projects such as white LEDs. One of the key areas of development is the production of materials with ultra–tiny structures used in energy generation and medicine. As part of that focus, ONEXIM purchased Optogan in 2008.

In June 2007, the Russian Prime Minister, Mikhail Fradkov, announced the formation of the Government Council for Nanotechnology, to oversee the development of nanotechnology in the country. Prokhorov was one of 15 individuals appointed to the council, which was to be chaired by then-First Deputy Prime Minister Sergei Ivanov.

In July 2009, the shareholders of RBC Information Systems agreed with Prokhorov's ONEXIM Group to sell an additional 51% stake for US$80 million, half of which went to pay off debts. The deal was closed in 2010. Prokhorov has business interests in mining and metallurgy (Polyus Gold, Intergeo, stake in Rusal), financial services (IFC-Bank, Soglassye insurance company, half of Renaissance Capital), utilities (stake in Quadra), nanotech, media (JV!) and real estate development (Open Investments).

In 2016, Onexim sold its 20% stake in Uralkrali, and is considering selling off assets including United Co. Rusal, Opin PJSC and Quadra.

In January 2022, ONEXIM Group sold 82.47% of the energy company PJSC Quadra to a subsidiary of Rosatom State Corporation.

== International investments and patronage ==
Prokhorov owns a number of international investments. In Israel, he owns two private hospitals, where he has paid for the medical treatment of friends such as Alla Pugacheva.

In March 2004, Prokhorov founded the Cultural Initiatives Foundation (as part of the Mikhail Prokhorov Foundation). It is headed by Prokhorov's elder sister, Irina, a prominent Russian publisher. At one time, he financially supported CSKA Moscow's basketball, hockey and football clubs, and is a member of the Supreme Council of the Sport Russia organization. He serves as president of the Russian Biathlon Union. He is also an avid freeride/freestyle jet skier. He performs tricks on a jet ski in a professional stand-up achievement. In the 60 Minutes interview he stated that a backflip is his most impressive trick.

In September 2009, he made an offer to buy a controlling interest in the New Jersey Nets of the National Basketball Association and half of a project to build a new arena in Brooklyn. On 11 May 2010, the NBA approved the sale of the Nets to Prokhorov, making him the majority owner of the team with an 80% stake. He also acquired a 45% interest in the new Barclays Center sports and entertainment arena.

He became the first non-North American team owner in the NBA. In December 2011, after announcing his run for the Russian presidency, the NBA confirmed that Prokhorov's ownership interest would not need to be altered in the event of his election (Herb Kohl, a then sitting but since retired U.S. Senator, owned the Milwaukee Bucks at the time). On 30 April 2012, the Nets officially made the move to Brooklyn, rebranding themselves as the Brooklyn Nets.

In October 2017, reports continued to circulate that Prokhorov was moving closer to closing the sale of 49 percent of the Brooklyn Nets. On 27 October, ESPN reported that Prokhorov had agreed to sell the 49 percent to Taiwanese-Canadian businessman Joseph Tsai, co-founder and executive vice chairman of Alibaba. The stake was valued at $1.2 billion. On 18 September 2019, Prokhorov sold the remaining 51 percent of the Nets to Tsai. According to Dmitry Razumov, CEO of Onexim, Prokhorov's investment was less than $1.5 billion, and the overall sale was estimated at $3.5 billion, with an income of about $2 billion.

Prokhorov controls, and is one of the largest investors in, Sensorium Corp, a virtual reality company.

== Controversies ==
At a Christmas party for the Russian nouveau riche at the French Alpine resort of Courchevel in January 2007, he was arrested on suspicion of arranging prostitutes for his guests. After three days, he was released without charge. In September 2009, Prokhorov was officially cleared from this charge and the court case was dismissed. According to the French prosecutor, he had paid all expenses for the single women to travel to France, but they were not professional prostitutes or working for a prostitution agency.

Prokhorov made headlines in early March 2010 when he was forced to forfeit a £36 million deposit he had placed on the £360 million Villa Leopolda in the French Riviera in 2008. Under French property law, once an initial sale contract has been signed, a deposit can be refunded only during a seven-day cooling-off period. On 2 March 2010, a court at Nice in France ruled that the villa's owner, 71-year-old Lily Safra, could keep the £36 million deposit, plus £1 million in interest.

Regarding Prokhorov's political efforts and the Right Cause party, critical commentators claim that the entire endeavor is just a project of the Kremlin closely curated by Vladislav Surkov and that Prokhorov was effectively appointed to be the party leader rather than being chosen by independently minded party members. According to them, the "puppet party" was designed to divert opposition voters by using liberal rhetoric.

Prokhorov had run the Russian Biathlon Union from 2008 to 2014 and offered legal services to disqualified Russian biathletes.

Prokhorov is one of many "Russian oligarchs" named in the Countering America's Adversaries Through Sanctions Act, CAATSA, signed into law by President Donald Trump in 2017.

== Russian politics ==
In May 2011, Prokhorov announced a plan to join the leadership of the Russian pro-business political party Right Cause. While not antagonistic to the Kremlin, the party was seen as likely to support President Dmitry Medvedev rather than Prime Minister Vladimir Putin if the latter entered the 2012 presidential race. In June of that year, Prokhorov was elected to the leadership of the party at the Right Cause Party Congress of 2011. At the acceptance ceremony, Prokhorov officially criticized the present ruling tandem of Medvedev-Putin, the structure of Russia, and vowed to bring Russia back to a stable development course. However, in September 2011, Prokhorov reversed course and resigned from Right Cause, "condemning it as a 'puppet Kremlin party' micromanaged by a 'puppet master' in the president's office ... Vladislav Y. Surkov".

In 2014, Prokhorov announced that he was considering moving control of his ownership in the Brooklyn Nets to one of his Russian-based subsidiaries, in an attempt to comply with Putin's order, signed into law in 2013, that no Russian politicians should have foreign assets and equity, and that all Russian companies should be registered and pay tax locally.

In 2016, Prokhorov ran afoul of Putin when his media group Onexim, specifically RBC Media, published articles and news reports on the Panama Papers and Putin's son-in-law Kirill Shamalov's connections and offshore assets. Onexim offices were raided by the Federal Security Service as well as tax department officials, in April 2016. The raids were officially described as part of an investigation into another bank but the FSB reported that tax violations were discovered at "a number of commercial structures".

A number of media journalists, including editor-in-chief of RBC Media, were fired after the raid, amid rumors of pressure and opposition from the Kremlin.

In June 2012, he became the leader of the Civic Platform Party. In 2015, Prokhorov resigned as leader of the party and left it.

=== 2012 presidential campaign ===
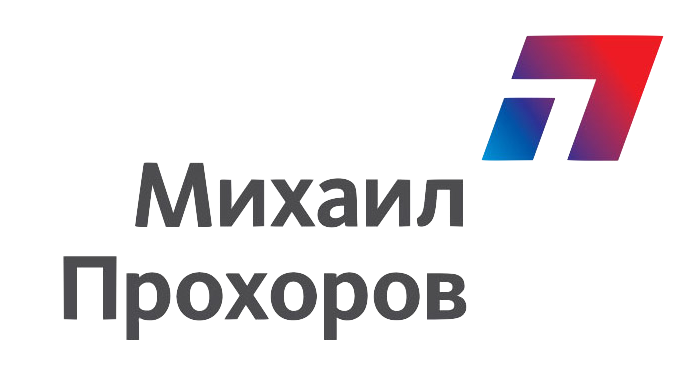
Prokhorov presidential campaign logo

In December 2011, after the legislative elections, Prokhorov announced that he would contest the 2012 presidential election against Vladimir Putin as an independent. He called it "probably the most important decision of my life". According to Communist leader Gennady Zyuganov and opposition leader Boris Nemtsov, both saw the move as inspired by the Kremlin. According to Nemtsov, it was an attempt "to preserve Putin's regime". He collected 2 million signatures needed to allow him to run for the presidency. Prokhorov said he would not base his campaign on criticism of Putin. "Criticism must make up no more than 10% ... I would like to focus on the things I would do," he said.

On 4 March 2012 presidential polling, Prokhorov gained 7.98% of the vote. On election day, Prokhorov said: "Initially I had no illusions that I was going to the presidential elections, which are, in fact, dishonest. Obviously, preferences were made in favor of one candidate".

== Lawsuit against Grigory Rodchenkov ==
Following Russia's banning from the 2018 Winter Olympics and the stripping of medals from multiple Russian athletes, in February 2018, Prokorov agreed to finance a defamation lawsuit in New York against Grigory Rodchenkov, the former mastermind behind Russia's state sponsored Olympic doping program. The suit claims that Rodchenkov defamed three Russian biathletes — Olga Zaytseva, Yana Romanova and Olga Vilukhina — when Rodchenkov included them on a list of athletes who took performance-enhancing drugs as part of a state-controlled program that corrupted the 2014 Winter Olympics in Sochi, Russia. The women, who were stripped of the silver medal they won as part of a relay team, were seeking $10 million each in damages.

In April 2018, Rodchenkov, through his lawyer, Jim Walden, countersued Prokhorov under New York's anti-SLAPP law asserting that Prokhorov's suit was frivolous and intended to limit an individual's First Amendment rights to free speech. According to published reports, the countersuit is likely to seek the names of other individuals who are financing the lawsuit against Rodchenkov as well as information about the assets of Prokhorov.

Walden said he believes Prokhorov's lawsuit was intentionally designed to uncover Rodchenkov's whereabouts in the United States and allow agents of the Russian government to find him.

== Personal life ==
Prokhorov has never been married, but has been engaged twice. Shortly after purchasing the Nets, he vowed to get married if the Nets had not won the NBA championship within five years. In July 2015, he rescinded the pledge, saying that NBA Commissioner Adam Silver had "taken his place" by marrying in May. While Prokhorov was romantically linked to Ksenia Sobchak in the media, he has not named any specific woman as a possible bride, only that he might marry, and has never done so.

In 2017, Prokhorov was featured on the Late Show with Stephen Colbert as part of the Russia Week report.

== Awards ==
In August 2006, he was awarded the Order of Friendship for his significant contribution to the growth of Russia's economic potential, when the President of the Russian Federation, Vladimir Putin, signed an order for the granting of state honors on 18 August 2006. In March 2011, he was bestowed with the French Legion of Honour. France's ambassador to Moscow, Jean de Gliniasty, presented it at the French embassy in Moscow.

== See also ==
- Israel–Russia relations
- List of billionaires
- List of Russian billionaires
- Ё-mobile

Sporting positions
Preceded by Bruce Ratner	New Jersey Nets principal owner Brooklyn Nets principal owner 2010–2019	Succeeded by Joseph Tsai
