= Civic Platform (Russia) =

Political party in Russia

Civic Platform Гражданская платформа
- Leader: Rifat Shaykhutdinov
- Founder: Mikhail Prokhorov
- Founded: 14 June 2012; 14 years ago
- Split from: Right Cause
- Headquarters: Blagoveshchensky Lane 3/1, Moscow
- Youth wing: Novoye Vremya (Новое время)
- Membership (2014): 26,030
- Ideology: Liberal conservatism; Putinism
- Political position: Centre-right to right-wing
- State Duma group: Liberal Democratic Party of Russia
- Colors: Blue-purple-red gradient
- State Duma: 0 / 450
- Regional Parliaments: 2 / 3,994

Party flag
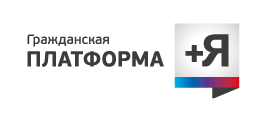

Website
- праваяпартия.рф

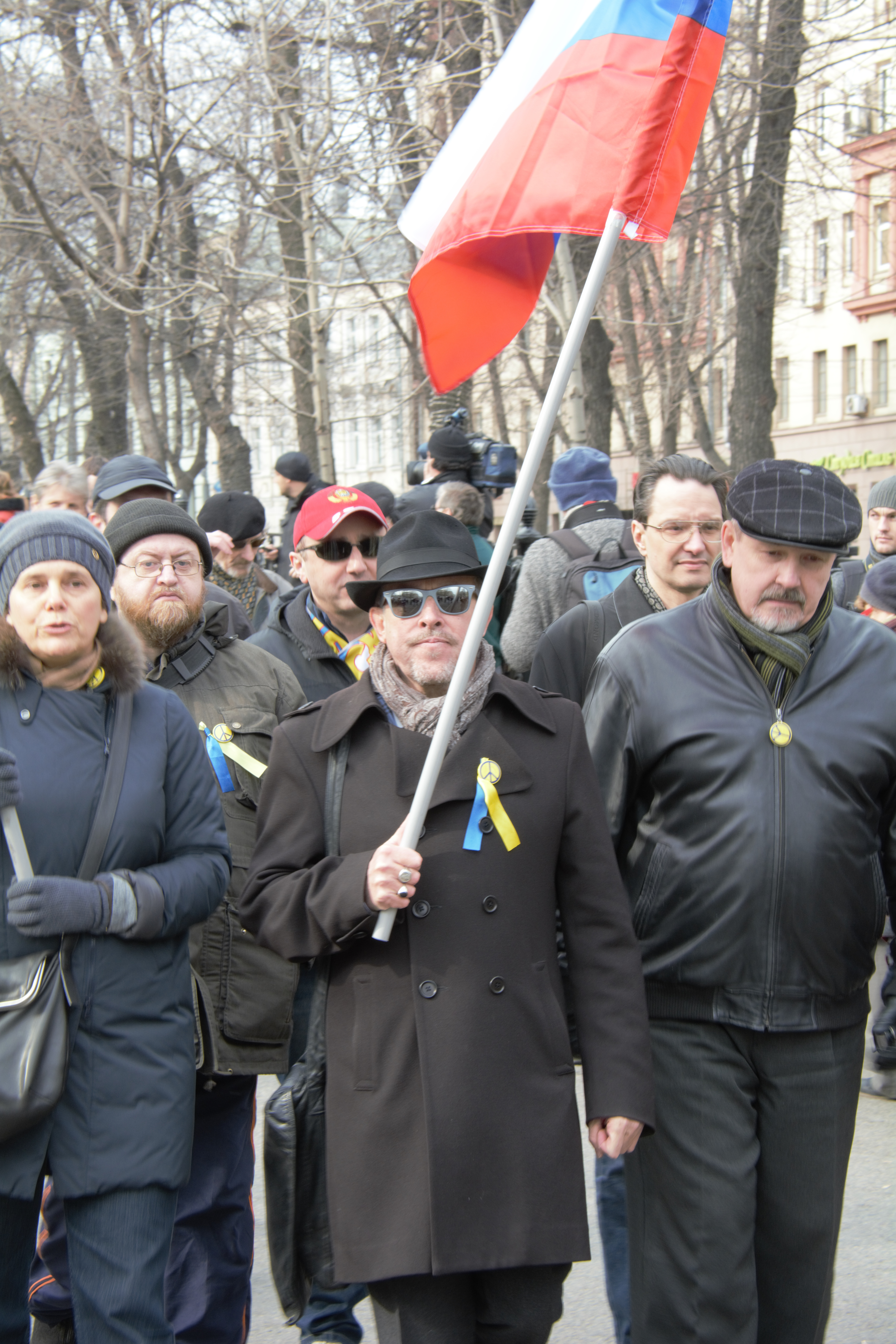
The leader of the party, Irina Prokhorova with Andrey Makarevich, 2014 Russian anti-war protests

Civic Platform (Russian: Гражданская Платформа, romanized: Grazhdanskaya Platforma, IPA: [ɡrɐʐˈdanskəjə plɐtˈformə]) was a conservative political party in Russia. The party was formed on 4 June 2012 by oligarch and 2012 presidential candidate Mikhail Prokhorov.

The party was formed with 500 members, the minimum number required by law for a party to be registered in Russia, with the party originally being founded as a rudimentary mechanism through which independent candidates could stand in elections.

Prokhorov announced his decision to leave the party in 2015 and was subsequently replaced by Rifat Shaykhutdinov as party leader. Since then, the party has supported President Vladimir Putin.

On 30 April 2026 the Supreme Court of Russia has suspended the party's operations due to a lawsuit by the russian Ministry of Justice.

== Purpose ==
According to founder Mikhail Prokhorov, the Civic Platform was founded primarily in order to "participate in municipal elections in cities with a population of 500,000 or more". Prokhorov explained: "In Russia, there are 14 megacities and 23 cities where the population exceeds half a million people. That is where the most enterprising people live, those who form the framework of Russia". The focus of the party on local elections was also explained by the fact that analysts and opposition activists believed that they would likely see the most political action in the near future, as unlike politics on the federal level, local elections are not always monopolised by the dominant ruling party United Russia.

Prokhorov stated that the party would support the "evolutionary development of the country". He also said that the party would cooperate with both the existing regime and the opposition. Although he founded the party, Prokhorov did not himself join Civic Platform. He primarily launched the party as a small, 'bare-bones' group that would exist on paper to enable independents to run for office (in Russian elections it is easier for candidates to run if they have party backing).

== History ==
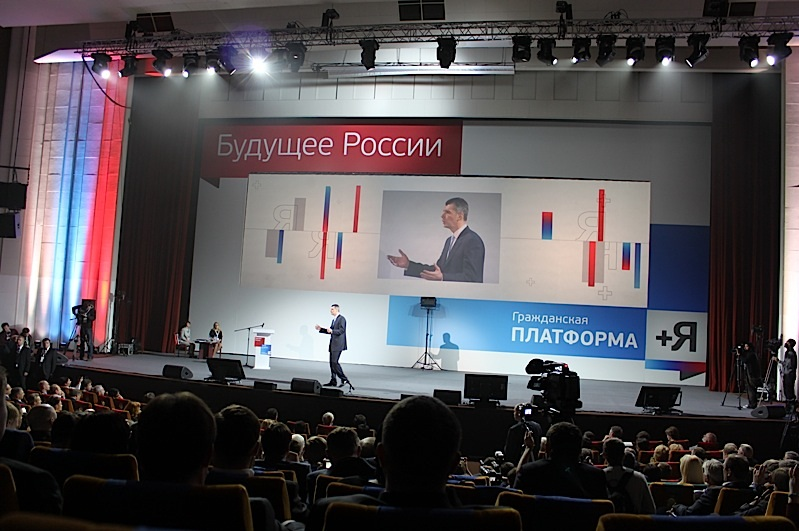
Congress of "Civic Platform" Party in October 2012. Mikhail Prokhorov Opening Speech.

=== Creation ===
Mikhail Prokhorov began participating in Russian politics in May 2011 when he announced that he would join the leadership of the Russian pro-business political party Right Cause. In June, Prokhorov was elected to the leadership of the party at the Right Cause Party Congress in 2011. However, in September, Prokhorov reversed course and resigned from Right Cause, condemning it as "a 'puppet Kremlin party' micromanaged by a 'puppet master' in the president's office ..., Vladislav Y. Surkov".

In December 2011, after the legislative elections, Prokhorov announced that he would contest the 2012 presidential election against Vladimir Putin as an independent candidate, In March 2012 presidential polling, Prokhorov gained 7.94% of the vote, and he promised to create a new party. On his official website he invited its supporters to take part in the selection of names for the party that he was planning to organize.

Among the proposal names were the "New Russia" Party, Democratic Party of Russia, and Free Russia Party. Finally, in June 2012, Prokhorov announced that the new party would carry the name "Civic Platform" Party.

At the time of the party's founding, a new party reform law had been introduced in response to mass protests across Russia during 2011 and 2012 against alleged mass electoral fraud in the 2011 legislative election, and this law allowed new parties other than the existing 7 officially registered ones to be formed. Most of the new parties that were created lacked recognizable national leaders, regional cadres or material resources, but the Civic Platform was an exception as it was headed by the billionaire presidential candidate Prokhorov.

=== 2012–2014 ===
The party started off with a handful of elected representatives. Sergey Andreyev was elected the 4th Mayor of Tolyatti as the only representative from the party in the regional high office. Another known political figure was Evgeny Urlashov, Mayor of Yaroslavl from 1 April 2012 until July 2013, when he was arrested by Investigative Committee of Russia and accused of corruption charges.

This was shortly before the regional legislature election, which was in September. He maintained that he was being targeted for his anti-establishment views and that the charges were politically motivated. Urshalov had won the mayoral election with 70% of the vote in April 2012 in a political upset, overwhelmingly defeating Kremlin-backed Yakov Yakushev. After his arrest, Urlashov stated in a TV interview: "I had been warned that they would get me out of the picture by any means possible", and said that his accuser was a prominent member of the pro-Kremlin United Russia party. Urlashov had previously left United Russia in 2011 after complaining about the party's high-handed tactics. Analysts asserted that Urlashov's arrest was part of a Kremlin tactic of using anti-corruption charges to eliminate opposition figures. Prokhorov said after the arrest that "the demonstration seizure of the elected leader of the city is a blow to the civil liberties of every Russian citizen". In the following Yaroslavl regional elections the Civic Platform was barred from the ballot because it had failed to open an official campaign bank account in time for registration. This was because Civic Platform's financial representative, Natalia Semyonova, had been detained and kept in a police station until the deadline for opening the bank account had passed. Local observers claimed that the real reasons for the exclusion were political.

During the 2013 Russian regional elections several opposition candidates won elections, after mass-protests broke out across Russia during 2011–2013 after the 2011 legislative elections. The Civic Platform scored one notable victory when Yevgeny Roizman was elected mayor of Yekaterinburg. The party also won city council seats in Yekaterinburg and Krasnoyarsk, and won 1–4 seats in four regions, making it the only new party formed after the 2012 party reform law to achieve such wide success.

However, Prokhorov noted that the Kremlin did not allow proper competition for gubernatorial seats. "The most important points of control are governors and regional legislatures...The money is all at the level of governor". In the concurrent September 2013 gubernatorial elections, all of Civic Platform's candidates had been disqualified from running on formal and technical grounds.

In early 2013, Prokhorov had said that he could run again in a future presidential election, saying: "If the Civic Platform continues to move ahead, further participation in presidential elections is a possibility". Between December 2013 and July 2014, the party was chaired by Prokhorov's sister, Irina. By May 2014, the party had gained 13 seats in regional parliaments, out of a total of 3,787.

=== 2015–present ===
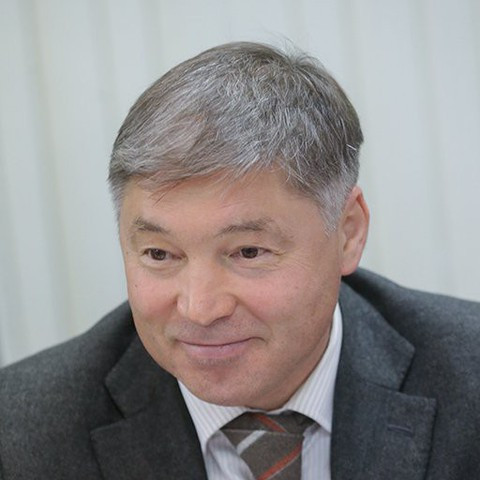
Party leader Rifat Shaykhutdinov

In February 2015, some members from Civic Platform took part in the (pro-Putin) "anti-Maidan" demonstrations in Moscow. Prokhorov criticized them and said the rally had "little to do with the initial ideology of the Civil Platform party." "We will find other outlets for our projects," he added, and recommended that the party should change its name. The rally was attended by the party's head Rifat Shaykhutdinov. Shaikhutdinov was subsequently removed as leader by a vote of the party's members after the event, but he retained his position as chairman of the party's federal committee. In March, Prokhorov announced his decision to quit the party.

In the 2016 legislative election, party leader Rifat Shaykhutdinov was elected to the State Duma. Shaykhutdinov did not vote in favour of the Medvedev II and the Mishustin Cabinet but usually supports the government's proposals.

On 11 December 2017, the leader of the Civic Platform Rifat Shaykhutdinov also said that his party would support current president Vladimir Putin in the 2018 Russian presidential election, meaning four out of six parties represented in the State Duma supported his candidacy. On the decision, Shaykhutdinov stated:

Our party historically supports the course taken by Vladimir Putin. Starting with Crimea, as you remember, we went through a rather difficult period of our foundation and political maturity, supporting the reunification with Crimea.

== Electoral results ==
=== Presidential ===
Election	Candidate	First round		Second round		Result
Election	Candidate	Votes	%	Votes	%	Result
2018	Endorsed Vladimir Putin	56,430,712	76.69	—N/a		Won
2024	Endorsed Vladimir Putin	76,277,708	87.28	—N/a		Won

=== State Duma ===
Election	Leader	Votes	%	Seats	+/–	Rank	Government
2016	Rifat Shaykhutdinov	115,433	0.22	1 / 450		▲13th	Support
2021	Rifat Shaykhutdinov	86,964	0.15	1 / 450	0	▼14th	Support

== See also ==
- List of political parties in Russia
