= Ufa constituency =

Ufa single-member constituency
- Constituency of the Russian State Duma

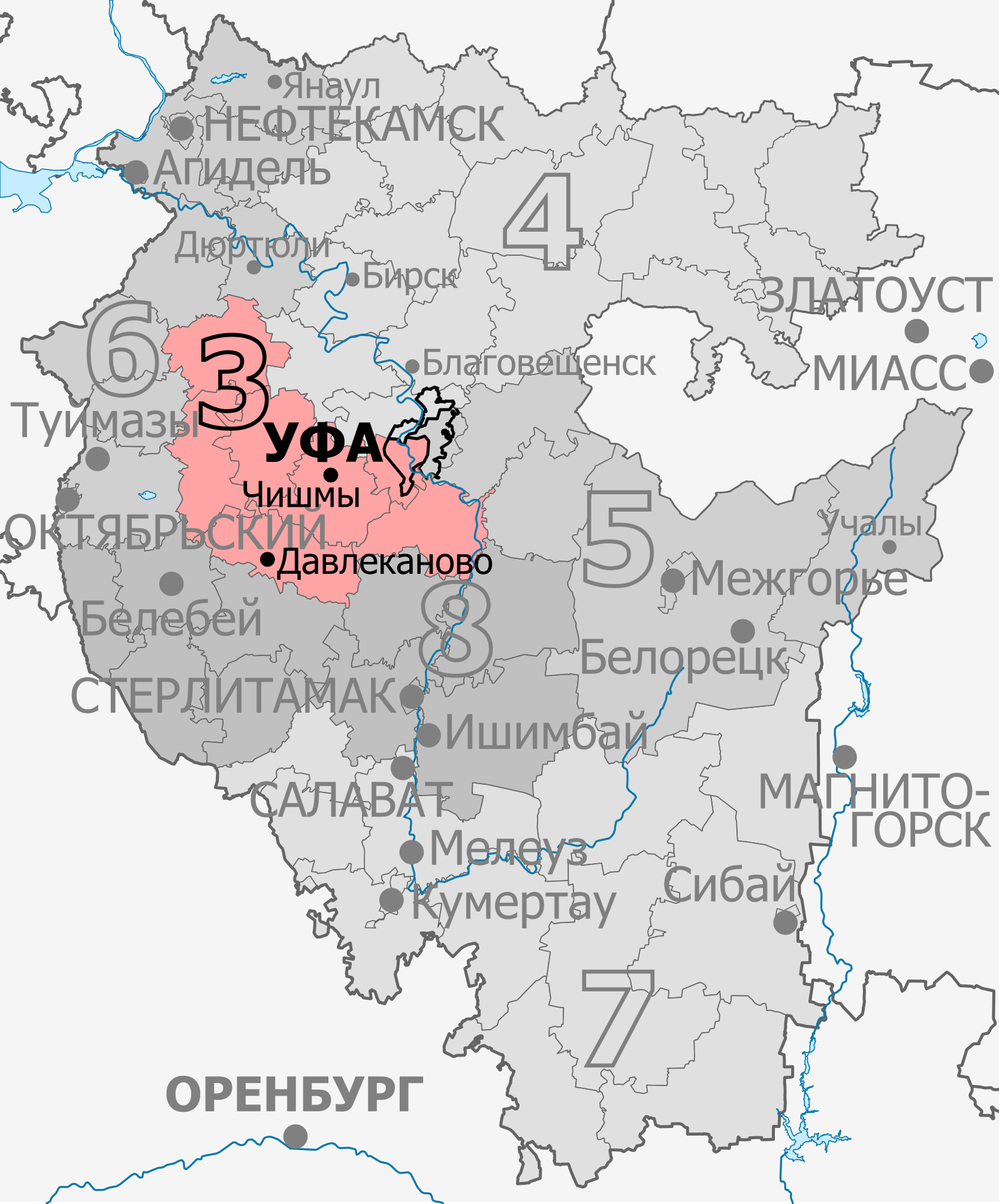
- Constituency boundaries since 2016
- Deputy: Denis Chernavin; United Russia
- Federal subject: Republic of Bashkortostan
- Districts: Blagovarsky, Buzdyaksky, Chekmagushevsky, Chishminsky, Davlekanovsky, Karmaskalinsky, Ufa (Dyomsky, Kirovsky, Sovetsky), Ufimsky (Avdonsky, Bulgakovsky, Chesnokovsky, Olkhovsky, Yumatovsky, Taptykovsky, Zhukovsky, Zubovsky)
- Voters: 500,985 (2026)

The Ufa constituency (No.3 (Note: Kirovsky constituency No.5 in 1993-1995, Kirovsky constituency No.4 in 1995-2003)) is a Russian legislative constituency in Bashkortostan. The constituency covers parts of Ufa, its suburbs and exurbs to the south and west. The present day Ufa constituency was created in 2015 after combining old Kirovsky and Sovetsky constituencies.

The constituency has been represented since 2026 by United Russia deputy Denis Chernavin, retired Russian Air Force colonel and Hero of Russia, who won the open seat, left vacant following the death of three-term United Russia deputy Pavel Kachkayev.

== Boundaries ==
1993–2003 Kirovsky constituency: Arkhangelsky District, Chishminsky District, Iglinsky District, Karmaskalinsky District, Ufa (Dyomsky, Kirovsky, Leninsky, Sovetsky), Ufimsky District
The constituency covered southern half of Ufa, including the city historic centre, almost all of its suburbs and some exurbs to its south and east.

2003–2007 Kirovsky constituency: Alsheyevsky District, Aurgazinsky District, Belebey, Belebeyevsky District, Chishminsky District, Davlekanovo, Davlekanovsky District, Karmaskalinsky District, Ufa (Kirovsky, Oktyabrsky), Ufimsky District (Avdon, Bulgakovo, Chesnokovka, Kirillovo, Milovka, Olkhovoye, Russky Yurmash, Selo sanatoriya Yumatovo imeni 15-letiya BASSR, Taptykovo, Zhukovo, Zubovo)
The constituency was significantly altered after the 2003 redistricting, losing central Ufa to new Sovetsky constituency and rural exurbs of the city to the Kalininsky constituency. The constituency instead stretched to the south-west, gaining rural areas up to the industrial city of Belebey from the former Tuymazy constituency.

2016–present: Blagovarsky District, Buzdyaksky District, Chekmagushevsky District, Chishminsky District, Davlekanovsky District, Karmaskalinsky District, Ufa (Dyomsky, Kirovsky, Sovetsky), Ufimsky District (Avdon, Bulgakovo, Chesnokovka, Olkhovoye, Selo sanatoriya Yumatovo imeni 15-letiya BASSR, Taptykovo, Zhukovo, Zubovo)
The constituency was re-created for the 2016 election and received a new name "Ufimsky constituency". This seat retained Kirovsky District of Ufa and rural areas to the south and south-west of the city, as well as gained Dyomsky and Sovtesky Districts of Ufa and rural areas west of the city from the dissolved Sovetsky constituency.

== Members elected ==
Election	Member	Party
1993	Rais Asayev	Agrarian Party
1995	Valentin Nikitin	Communist Party
1999	Robert Nigmatulin	Independent
2003	Mars Kalmetyev	United Russia
2007	Proportional representation - no election by constituency	
2011	Proportional representation - no election by constituency	
2016	Pavel Kachkayev (Note: died in May 2025)	United Russia
2021	Pavel Kachkayev	United Russia
2026	Denis Chernavin	United Russia

== Election results ==
=== 1993 ===
==== Declared candidates ====
- Rais Asayev (APR), kolkhoz chairman
- Nail Bakhtizin (Independent), former Member of Supreme Soviet of the Bashkir ASSR (1980–1985), deputy chief engineer of the Kuybyshev Railway Bashkortostan division
- Radik Dayanov (Independent), Head of the Ufa Kirovsky District Department of Agriculture and Food
- Pavel Dmitriyev (Independent), attorney
- Sergey Lavrentyev (BR–NI), Bashkir State University associate professor
- Fanis Rayanov (Independent), Bashkir State University faculty of law dean
- Viktor Vyazovoy (Independent), marketing businessman

==== Results ====
Summary of the 12 December 1993 Russian legislative election in the Kirovsky constituency
Candidate	Party	Votes	%
Rais Asayev	Agrarian Party	58,573	22.82%
Pavel Dmitriyev	Independent	–	14.94%
Nail Bakhtizin	Independent	–	–
Radik Dayanov	Independent	–	–
Sergey Lavrentyev	Future of Russia–New Names	–	–
Fanis Rayanov	Independent	–	–
Viktor Vyazovoy	Independent	–	–
Total		256,628	100%

=== 1995 ===
==== Declared candidates ====
- Anatoly Baydin (VOPDT), Deputy Head of the Regional Department of Air Transport
- Erast Fomichev (FDD), nonprofit president, alleged crime boss
- Altaf Galeyev (Independent), radio station president
- Faiz Galikeyev (DVR–OD), pensioner
- Valery Geta (Independent), Deputy Military Commissioner of Bashkortostan (1992–present)
- Ibragim Gulayev (V–N!), corporate executive
- Askhat Iskhakov (LDPR), party activist
- Sergey Lavrentyev (Social Democrats), Bashkir Academy of Public Administration and Management faculty of public administration dean, 1993 BR–NI candidate for this seat
- Ravil Nasibullin (NDR), Ufa State Aviation Technical University department head
- Minrauza Nazmetdinova (Women of Russia), former People's Deputy of Russia (1990–1993)
- Valentin Nikitin (CPRF), Member of State Duma (1994–present)
- Anatoly Polyntsev (BIR), veterans' rights activist
- Konstantin Prasolov (K–TR–zSS), power station dispatcher
- Mars Safarov (DOBRo), Bashkir State University department of organic chemistry head
- Leo Sharygin (Forward, Russia!), construction businessman
- Sergey Starovoytov (Independent), film executive

==== Declined ====
- Rais Asayev (APR), incumbent Member of State Duma (1994–present)

==== Results ====
Summary of the 17 December 1995 Russian legislative election in the Kirovsky constituency
Candidate	Party	Votes	%
Valentin Nikitin	Communist Party	74,367	23.20%
Minrauza Nazmetdinova	Women of Russia	49,650	15.49%
Ravil Nasibullin	Our Home – Russia	43,848	13.68%
Mars Safarov	Education — Future of Russia	21,006	6.55%
Sergey Lavrentyev	Social Democrats	12,887	4.02%
Ibragim Gulayev	Power to the People	10,269	3.20%
Erast Fomichev	Federal Democratic Movement	10,029	3.13%
Anatoly Polyntsev	Ivan Rybkin Bloc	9,113	2.84%
Konstantin Prasolov	Communists and Working Russia - for the Soviet Union	8,886	2.77%
Leo Sharygin	Forward, Russia!	6,783	2.12%
Anatoly Baydin	Political Movement of Transport Workers	6,608	2.06%
Faiz Galikeyev	Democratic Choice of Russia – United Democrats	6,529	2.04%
Askhat Iskhakov	Liberal Democratic Party	6,471	2.02%
Valery Geta	Independent	5,239	1.63%
Altaf Galeyev	Independent	5,106	1.59%
Sergey Starovoytov	Independent	1,855	0.58%
against all		29,494	9.20%
Total		320,563	100%

=== 1999 ===
==== Declared candidates ====
- Mikhail Anfyorov (Independent), Ufa State Aviation Technical University professor
- Mikhail Davydov (Independent), deputy chief of the Kuybyshev Railway Bashkortostan division
- Airat Dilmukhametov (Independent), Bashkir nationalist
- Rafail Dzhalilov (Independent), billionaire businessman
- Marat Mirgazyamov (Yabloko), former Premier of Bashkortostan (1986–1992), former People's Deputy of the Soviet Union (1989–1991), 1998 presidential candidate
- Robert Nigmatulin (Independent), Member of State Assembly of the Republic of Bashkortostan (1995–present), president of Academy of Sciences of Bashkortostan (1995–present)
- Valentin Nikitin (CPRF), incumbent Member of State Duma (1994–present), 1998 presidential candidate
- Ural Suleymanov (Independent), security consultant

==== Withdrawn candidates ====
- Shamil Gantsev (Independent), oncologist

==== Failed to qualify ====
- Rifgat Chanyshev (Independent), attorney
- Sergey Kuznetsov (Independent)

==== Did not file ====
- Artyom Mazharuk (Independent)
- Valiakhmet Mustafin (Independent)

==== Results ====
Summary of the 19 December 1999 Russian legislative election in the Kirovsky constituency
Candidate	Party	Votes	%
Robert Nigmatulin	Independent	106,901	33.99%
Valentin Nikitin (incumbent)	Communist Party	55,371	17.60%
Marat Mirgazyamov	Yabloko	49,320	15.68%
Mikhail Davydov	Independent	44,055	14.01%
Mikhail Anfyorov	Independent	10,754	3.42%
Airat Dilmukhametov	Independent	10,565	3.36%
Ural Suleymanov	Independent	6,413	2.04%
Rafail Dzhalilov	Independent	3,054	0.97%
against all		21,522	6.84%
Total		314,549	100%

=== 2003 ===
==== Declared candidates ====
- Rafika Amineva (Rodina), former Member of Ufa City Council, retired gymnasium principal
- Flyur Asadullin (Independent), Member of State Assembly of the Republic of Bashkortostan (2003–present), middle school teacher
- Artur Asafyev (Yabloko), journalist
- Mars Kalmetyev (United Russia), Member of State Assembly of the Republic of Bashkortostan (1995–present), Head of Ufa Kirovsky District (1995–present)
- Aleksey Morozov (Independent), Member of Ufa City Council, nonprofit director
- Robert Nigmatulin (Independent), incumbent Member of State Duma (2000–present)
- Valentin Nikitin (CPRF), Member of State Duma (1994–present), Chairman of the Duma Committee on Nationalities (2001–present), 1998 presidential candidate (previously ran as an independent candidate)
- Fail Safin (Independent), ethnologist
- Aleksandr Tokarchuk (ORP Rus'), postgraduate student

==== Failed to qualify ====
- Ragib Gimayev (Independent), Member of State Duma (2000–present)
- Viktor Rezyapov (SDPR), former Member of Supreme Council of Bashkortostan (1990–1995), retired energy tekhnikum director

==== Did not file ====
- Andrey Bunakov (Independent), Bashkir State Pedagogical University senior lab technician
- Askar Fazlyyev (Independent), shopping mall manager
- Rim Khabibov (APR), kolkhoz chairman
- Aleksey Lysyuk (DPR), chairman of the party regional office
- Maksim Prokhorov (Independent), businessman
- Yazar Utarbayev (VR–ES), prorector of Bashkir State Medical Academy

==== Results ====
Summary of the 7 December 2003 Russian legislative election in the Kirovsky constituency
Candidate	Party	Votes	%
Mars Kalmetyev	United Russia	104,815	27.09%
Valentin Nikitin	Communist Party	46,932	12.13%
Fail Safin	Independent	41,223	10.65%
Robert Nigmatulin (incumbent)	Independent	38,050	9.83%
Flyur Asadullin	Independent	32,381	8.37%
Aleksey Morozov	Independent	27,832	7.19%
Rafika Amineva	Rodina	17,555	4.54%
Artur Asafyev	Yabloko	16,305	4.21%
Aleksandr Tokarchuk	United Russian Party Rus'	5,711	1.48%
against all		37,612	9.72%
Total		387,835	100%

=== 2016 ===
==== Declared candidates ====
- Yelena Andreyeva (The Greens), real estate analyst
- Aigul Baiguskarova (A Just Russia), pharmaceutical executive
- Pavel Kachkayev (United Russia), Member of State Duma (2011–present)
- Renat Minniakhmetov (LDPR), IT specialist
- Boris Nurislamov (CPCR), first secretary of the party regional committee, perennial candidate
- Viktor Petrov (Party of Growth), businessman
- Fail Safin (Rodina), ethnologist, 2003 candidate for this seat
- Rais Saubanov (Patriots of Russia), former Member of State Assembly of the Republic of Bashkortostan (1999–2003, 2008–2013), construction businessman
- Aleksandr Yushchenko (CPRF), Member of State Duma (2011–present)

==== Withdrawn candidates ====
- Rustem Mulyukov (Yabloko), lawyer, community activist

==== Failed to qualify ====
- Renat Galiullin (Independent), entrepreneur
- Roza Khamatnurova (Independent), pensioner

==== Did not file ====
- Ildar Suyushev (Independent), law firm partner

==== Declined ====
- Rustem Akhmadinurov (United Russia), Member of State Assembly of the Republic of Bashkortostan (2013–present), director of the Russian State Social University, Ufa branch (2004–present) (lost the primary)
- Svetlana Gladysheva (United Russia), 1994 Silver Medalist alpine skier (lost the primary)
- Anvar Makhmutov (United Russia), Member of State Duma (2011–present) (lost the primary)

==== Results ====
Summary of the 18 September 2016 Russian legislative election in the Ufa constituency
Candidate	Party	Votes	%
Pavel Kachkayev	United Russia	186,059	53.63%
Aleksandr Yushchenko	Communist Party	63,021	18.17%
Renat Minniakhmetov	Liberal Democratic Party	23,663	6.82%
Aigul Baiguskarova	A Just Russia	19,691	5.68%
Yelena Andreyeva	The Greens	12,407	3.58%
Rais Saubanov	Patriots of Russia	11,241	3.24%
Boris Nurislamov	Communists of Russia	9,946	2.87%
Viktor Petrov	Party of Growth	8,554	2.47%
Fail Safin	Rodina	8,363	2.41%
Total		346,906	100%

=== 2021 ===
==== Declared candidates ====
- Veronika Ananyeva (LDPR), Member of Oktyabrsky City Council (2018–present), aide to State Duma member Ivan Sukharev
- Yevgeny Buyanov (New Party), community activist
- Pavel Kachkayev (United Russia), incumbent Member of State Duma (2011–present)
- Irina Kureli (Yabloko), pensioner
- Arseny Maslov (Rodina), industrial executive
- Pavel Matisov (CPCR), Marxist activist, perennial candidate
- Flyur Nurlygayanov (SR–ZP), former secretary general of the Russian Paralympic Committee (1997–2002)
- Gulnara Ruchkina (RPPSS), Financial University under the Government of the Russian Federation faculty of law dean
- Zhanna Wirvel (Party of Growth), attorney, businesswoman
- Aleksandr Yushchenko (CPRF), Member of State Duma (2011–present), 2016 candidate for this seat

==== Failed to qualify ====
- Yevgenia Kutsuyeva (Independent), marketing businesswoman, media strategist

==== Results ====
Summary of the 17-19 September 2021 Russian legislative election in the Ufa constituency
Candidate	Party	Votes	%
Pavel Kachkayev (incumbent)	United Russia	247,015	66.25%
Aleksandr Yushchenko	Communist Party	41,614	11.16%
Veronika Ananyeva	Liberal Democratic Party	33,888	9.09%
Flyur Nurlygayanov	A Just Russia — For Truth	11,430	3.07%
Pavel Matisov	Communists of Russia	9,707	2.60%
Yevgeny Buyanov	New People	9,517	2.55%
Gulnara Ruchkina	Party of Pensioners	5,930	1.59%
Irina Kureli	Yabloko	3,204	0.86%
Arseny Maslov	Rodina	3,144	0.84%
Zhanna Wirvel	Party of Growth	3,085	0.83%
Total		372,835	100%

=== 2026 ===
==== Declared candidates ====
- Veronika Ananyeva (LDPR), Member of Ufa Council (2021–present), aide to State Duma member Ivan Sukharev, 2021 candidate for this seat
- Denis Chernavin (United Russia), Russian Air Force colonel, Hero of Russia (2023)
- Ruslan Davletshin (New People), aide to State Duma Amir Hamitov
- Nelli Khashayeva (The Greens), construction executive
- Arseny Maslov (Rodina), businessman, 2021 candidate for this seat
- Flyur Nurlygayanov (A Just Russia), Member of State Assembly of the Republic of Bashkortostan (2023–present), 2021 candidate for this seat
- Robert Vagapov (RPPSS), former Minister of Industry and Innovations of Bashkortostan (2010–2011)
- Aleksandr Yushchenko (CPRF), Member of State Duma (2011–present), 2016 and 2021 candidate for this seat

==== Did not file ====
- Yevgenia Kutsuyeva (Independent), media strategist, ecological activist, 2021 candidate for this seat

==== Declined ====
- Elvira Matskevich (United Russia), Member of State Assembly of the Republic of Bashkortostan (2024–present) (lost the primary)
- Jeff Monson (United Russia), Member of State Assembly of the Republic of Bashkortostan (2023–present), mixed martial artist, boxer
- Timergali Urazgulov (United Russia), Member of State Assembly of the Republic of Bashkortostan (2023–present) (lost the primary)

==== Results ====
Summary of the 18-20 September 2026 Russian legislative election in the Ufa constituency
Candidate	Party	Votes	%
Denis Chernavin	United Russia	253,535	66.19%
Aleksandr Yushchenko	Communist Party	35,553	9.28%
Veronika Ananyeva	Liberal Democratic Party	28,988	7.57%
Ruslan Davletshin	New People	25,589	6.68%
Flyur Nurlygayanov	A Just Russia	20,106	5.25%
Robert Vagapov	Party of Pensioners	6,827	1.78%
Arseny Maslov	Rodina	4,973	1.30%
Nelli Khashayeva	The Greens	4,570	1.19%
Total		383,041	100%
