= 2023 Bashkortostan State Assembly election =

- 10 September 2023
- Turnout: 51.63% (▲2.64pp)
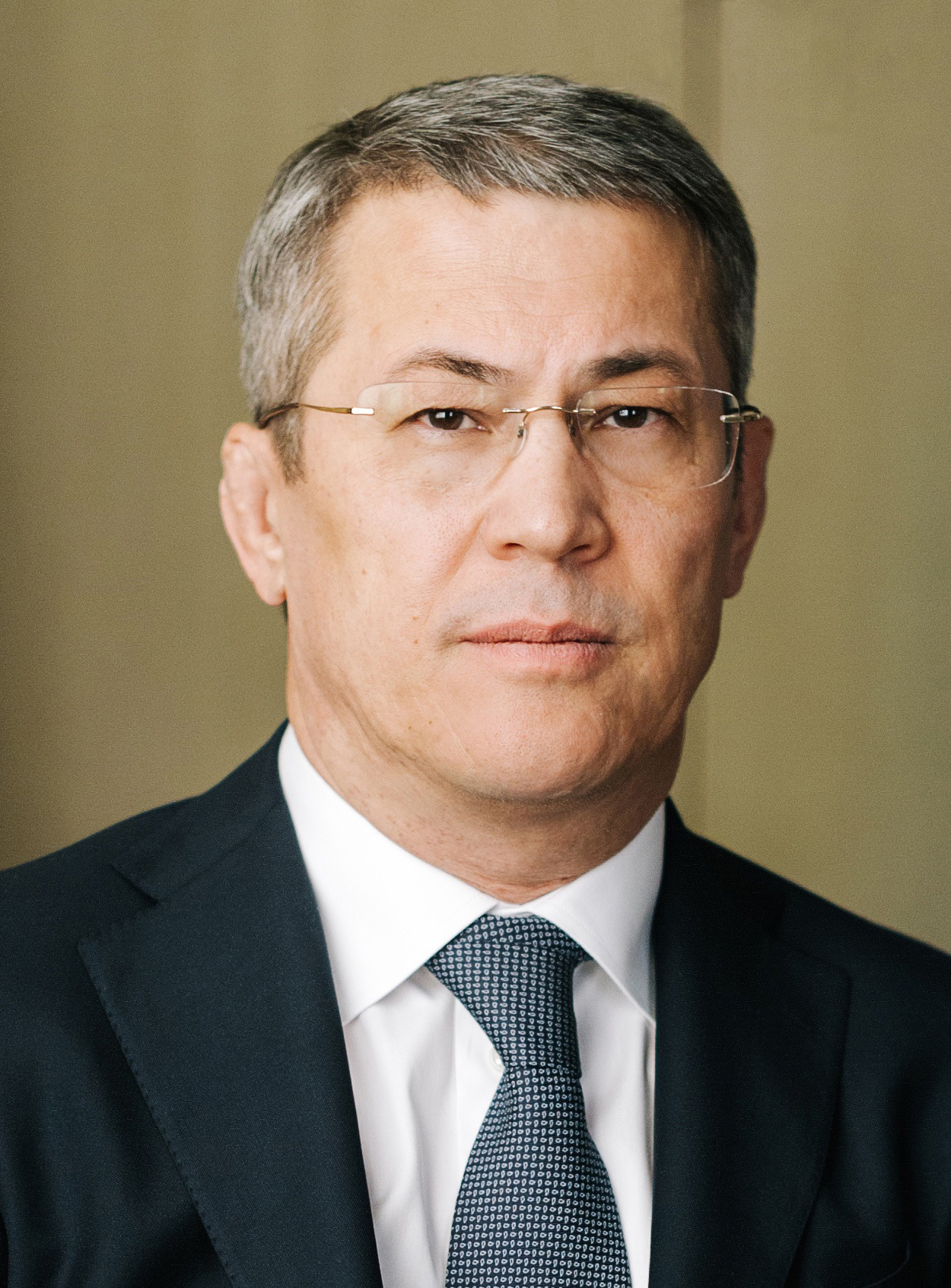

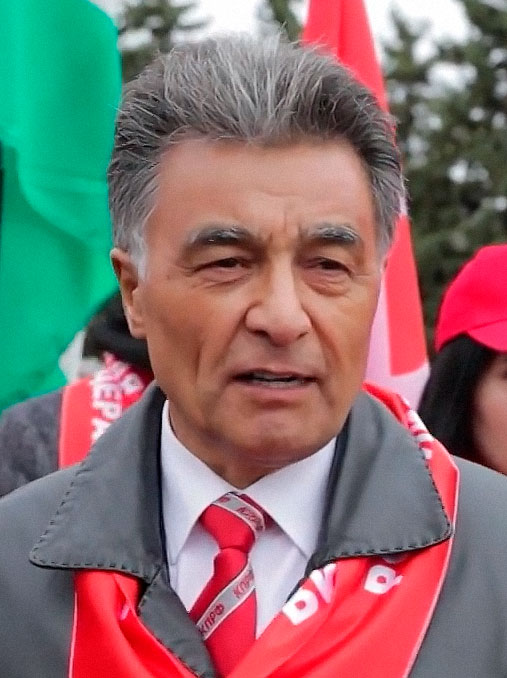

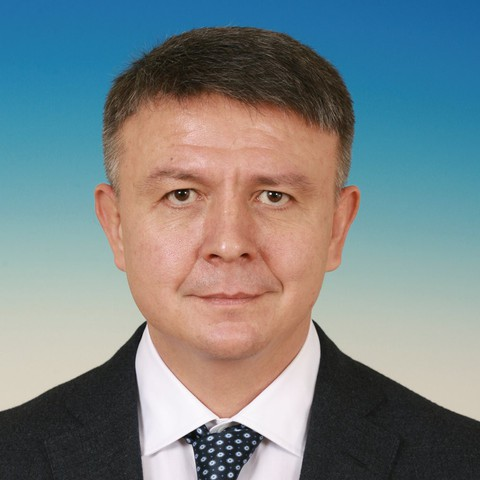

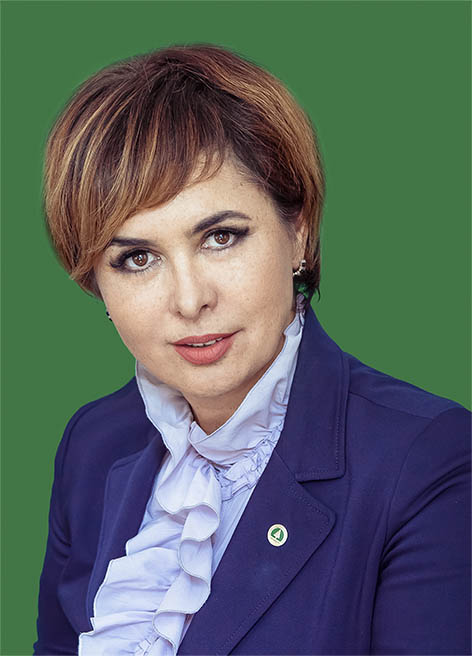
	Majority party	Minority party	Third party
			LDPR
Candidate	Radiy Khabirov	Yunir Kutluguzhin	Yuri Rudakov
Leader	Dmitry Medvedev	Gennady Zyuganov	Leonid Slutsky
Party	United Russia	CPRF	LDPR
Last election	59.21%, 79 seats	19.09%, 15 seats	10.11%, 7 seats
Seats won	87	8	4
Seat change	▲8	▼7	▼3
Popular vote	1,063,631	180,696	119,373
Percentage	69.50%	11.81%	7.80%
Swing	▲10.29pp	▼7.28pp	▼2.31pp
	Fourth party	Fifth party	Sixth party
	SR-ZP
Candidate	Vladimir Nagorny	Amir Khamitov	Rufina Shagapova
Leader	Sergey Mironov	Aleksey Nechayev	Andrey Nagibin
Party	SR-ZP	New People	The Greens
Last election	5.56%, 5 seats	–	2.01%, 1 seat
Seats won	5	1	1
Seat change	Steady	New	Steady
Popular vote	114,056	52,688	– (Note: Did not contest the party-list vote)
Percentage	7.45%	3.44%	–
Swing	▲1.89pp	New	–

The 2023 State Assembly of the Republic of Bashkortostan election took place on 10 September 2023, on common election day. All 110 seats in the State Assembly were up for reelection.

== Electoral system ==
Under current election laws, the State Assembly is elected for a term of five years, with parallel voting. 55 seats are elected by party-list proportional representation with a 5% electoral threshold, with the other half elected in 55 single-member constituencies by first-past-the-post voting. Seats in the proportional part are allocated using the Imperiali quota, modified to ensure that every party list, which passes the threshold, receives at least one mandate.

== Candidates ==
=== Party lists ===
To register regional lists of candidates, parties need to collect 0.5% of signatures of all registered voters in Bashkortostan.

The following parties were relieved from the necessity to collect signatures:

- United Russia
- Communist Party of the Russian Federation
- A Just Russia — Patriots — For Truth
- Liberal Democratic Party of Russia
- New People
- Russian Ecological Party "The Greens"

№	Party	Republic-wide list	Candidates	Territorial groups	Status
1	Communist Party	Yunir Kutluguzhin • Vadim Starov • Artur Shaynurov	93	43	Registered
2	A Just Russia – For Truth	Vladimir Nagorny	103	45	Registered
3	New People	Amir Khamitov • Ruslan Davletshin • Zulfia Gaysina	152	55	Registered
4	Liberal Democratic Party	Leonid Slutsky • Ivan Sukharev • Dmitry Ivanov	113	55	Registered
5	United Russia	Radiy Khabirov • Adelina Zagidullina • Artur Galeyev	164	55	Registered

New People will take part in Bashkir legislative election for the first time. Patriots of Russia has been dissolved prior, while Russian Ecological Party "The Greens" did not file.

=== Single-mandate constituencies ===
55 single-mandate constituencies were formed in Bashkortostan. To register candidates in single-mandate constituencies need to collect 3% of signatures of registered voters in the constituency.

Number of candidates in single-mandate constituencies
Party	Candidates	
Party	Nominated	Registered
United Russia	55	54
Communist Party	47	38
Liberal Democratic Party	55	55
A Just Russia — For Truth	35	34
New People	44	41
Yabloko	2	0
The Greens	1	1
Rodina	1	1
Party of Growth	1	0
Party of Pensioners	1	0
Independent	12	5
Total	254	229

== Polls ==
Fieldwork date	Polling firm	UR	LDPR	CPRF	NL	SR-ZP	Undecided
1–6 August 2023	Russian Field	38%	13%	11%	5%	3%	30%

== Results ==
Party	Party-list			Constituency			Total seats	+/–
Party	Votes	%	Seats	Votes	%	Seats	Total seats	+/–
United Russia	1,063,631	69.50	41			46	87	+8
Communist Party	180,696	11.81	6			2	8	–7
Liberal Democratic Party	119,373	7.80	4			0	4	–3
A Just Russia — For Truth	114,056	7.45	4			1	5	0
New People	52,688	3.44	0			1	1	New
The Greens						1	1	0
Rodina						0	0	New
Independents						4	4	+3
Total	1,530,444	100.00	55			55	110	0
Valid votes	1,530,444	99.16						
Invalid/blank votes	12,910	0.84						
Total votes	1,543,354	100.00						
Registered voters/turnout	2,989,078	51.63						
Source: CIKRB

Konstantin Tolkachyov (United Russia) was re-elected as Chairman of the State Assembly, while Head of Blagoveshchensky District Oleg Golov (United Russia) was appointed to the Federation Council, replacing retiring incumbent Senator Irek Yalalov (United Russia).

=== Results in single-member constituencies ===
==== District 1 ====
Summary of the 10 September 2023 State Assembly of the Republic of Bashkortostan election in Shaymuratovsky constituency No.1
Candidate	Party	Votes	%
Dmitry Gilimyanov	United Russia	15,449	79.14%
Anton Astakhov	Liberal Democratic Party	3,303	16.92%
Andrey Shabunevich	A Just Russia — For Truth	551	2.82%
Total		19,520	100%

==== District 2 ====
Summary of the 10 September 2023 State Assembly of the Republic of Bashkortostan election in Inorsovsky constituency No.2
Candidate	Party	Votes	%
Vasily Gorbunov	United Russia	12,298	78.01%
Flyur Nurlygayanov	A Just Russia — For Truth	1,336	8.47%
Dinar Dilmukhametov	Liberal Democratic Party	1,020	6.47%
Vadim Fayruzov	Communist Party	762	4.83%
Konstantin Kulikov	New People	304	1.93%
Total		15,765	100%

==== District 3 ====
Summary of the 10 September 2023 State Assembly of the Republic of Bashkortostan election in Pervomaysky constituency No.3
Candidate	Party	Votes	%
Yulai Kidrasov	Independent	11,325	59.04%
Natalya Kupriyanova	United Russia	4,902	25.56%
Rustam Saitgareyev	Communist Party	2,127	11.09%
Veronika Ananyeva	Liberal Democratic Party	525	2.74%
Vadim Yegoshin	New People	217	1.13%
Total		19,182	100%

==== District 4 ====
Summary of the 10 September 2023 State Assembly of the Republic of Bashkortostan election in Chernikovsky constituency No.4
Candidate	Party	Votes	%
Rustem Akhmetshin	United Russia	12,290	78.16%
Denis Kondratyev	Liberal Democratic Party	2,049	13.03%
Ildar Zaynetdin	Rodina	1,169	7.43%
Total		15,724	100%

==== District 5 ====
Summary of the 10 September 2023 State Assembly of the Republic of Bashkortostan election in Belorechensky constituency No.5
Candidate	Party	Votes	%
Aleksey Lokotchenko	United Russia	10,469	69.50%
Ildar Shafikov	Communist Party	2,162	14.35%
Eduard Sardarov	Liberal Democratic Party	1,463	9.71%
Radmir Bayramgulov	New People	868	5.76%
Total		15,064	100%

==== District 6 ====
Summary of the 10 September 2023 State Assembly of the Republic of Bashkortostan election in Pushkinsky constituency No.6
Candidate	Party	Votes	%
Vadim Zakharov	United Russia	14,899	76.40%
Aygul Zakharova	Communist Party	1,639	8.40%
Yevgeny Allabirdin	Liberal Democratic Party	1,089	5.58%
Yelena Fayzullina	A Just Russia — For Truth	874	4.48%
Aydar Basyrov	New People	781	4.00%
Total		19,502	100%

==== District 7 ====
Summary of the 10 September 2023 State Assembly of the Republic of Bashkortostan election in Leninsky constituency No.7
Candidate	Party	Votes	%
Oleg Filippov (incumbent)	A Just Russia — For Truth	9,119	52.78%
Rishat Sabitov	United Russia	6,452	37.34%
Kristina Dmitriyeva	Liberal Democratic Party	1,557	9.01%
Total		17,277	100%

==== District 8 ====
Summary of the 10 September 2023 State Assembly of the Republic of Bashkortostan election in Sipaylovsky constituency No.8
Candidate	Party	Votes	%
Yelena Rodina (incumbent)	United Russia	13,468	75.25%
Olesya Ivanova	Liberal Democratic Party	1,238	6.92%
Ildar Ramazanov	A Just Russia — For Truth	1,204	6.73%
Anna Zolotareva	New People	945	5.28%
Ilshat Adiyatullin	Communist Party	917	5.12%
Total		17,898	100%

==== District 9 ====
Summary of the 10 September 2023 State Assembly of the Republic of Bashkortostan election in Solnechny constituency No.9
Candidate	Party	Votes	%
Farit Gindullin	United Russia	13,638	75.87%
Leonid Biryukov	A Just Russia — For Truth	1,166	6.49%
Ruslan Davletshin	New People	1,151	6.40%
Valery Salikhov	Liberal Democratic Party	938	5.22%
Ildar Khusnitdinov	Communist Party	831	4.62%
Total		17,976	100%

==== District 10 ====
Summary of the 10 September 2023 State Assembly of the Republic of Bashkortostan election in Central constituency No.10
Candidate	Party	Votes	%
Salavat Khusainov (incumbent)	United Russia	14,511	81.32%
Igor Martov	Communist Party	1,590	8.91%
Aleksandr Zaytsev	Liberal Democratic Party	982	5.50%
Rustam Shorov	A Just Russia — For Truth	574	3.22%
Total		17,845	100%

==== District 11 ====
Summary of the 10 September 2023 State Assembly of the Republic of Bashkortostan election in Vazovsky constituency No.11
Candidate	Party	Votes	%
Rufina Shagapova (incumbent)	The Greens	10,261	53.12%
Yelizaveta Shayakhmetova	United Russia	3,230	16.72%
Azat Iskandarov	Liberal Democratic Party	2,104	10.89%
Vadim Sayfullin	Communist Party	1,986	10.28%
Aleksey Ryabov	New People	1,582	8.19%
Total		19,318	100%

==== District 12 ====
Summary of the 10 September 2023 State Assembly of the Republic of Bashkortostan election in Studenchesky constituency No.12
Candidate	Party	Votes	%
Salavat Kharasov (incumbent)	United Russia	12,081	63.70%
Makhmuza Gaynullina	Communist Party	2,830	14.92%
Ilya Biteyko	Liberal Democratic Party	2,178	11.48%
Shamil Zaripov	A Just Russia — For Truth	1,660	8.75%
Total		18,965	100%

==== District 13 ====
Summary of the 10 September 2023 State Assembly of the Republic of Bashkortostan election in Vokzalny constituency No.13
Candidate	Party	Votes	%
Timur Khakimov	United Russia	9,886	60.76%
Yevgeny Vishnyakov	Communist Party	2,350	14.44%
Andrey Skornyakov	A Just Russia — For Truth	1,443	8.87%
Fania Gaynetdinova	Liberal Democratic Party	1,135	6.98%
Rishat Allaguzin	New People	1,117	6.87%
Total		16,270	100%

==== District 14 ====
Summary of the 10 September 2023 State Assembly of the Republic of Bashkortostan election in Novikovsky constituency No.14
Candidate	Party	Votes	%
Kamil Buzykayev	Independent	7,246	51.02%
Yekaterina Samsonova	A Just Russia — For Truth	2,143	15.09%
Pavel Mochalkin	United Russia	2,065	14.54%
Ivan Golub	Liberal Democratic Party	1,455	10.24%
Radmir Gabdrashitov	New People	975	6.86%
Total		14,203	100%

==== District 15 ====
Summary of the 10 September 2023 State Assembly of the Republic of Bashkortostan election in Kumertausky constituency No.15
Candidate	Party	Votes	%
Olga Plokhova	United Russia	11,833	64.19%
Nikolay Gladilov	Communist Party	3,946	21.41%
Nikolay Kurzenkov	Liberal Democratic Party	1,912	10.37%
Renat Bikmurzin	New People	531	2.88%
Total		18,434	100%

==== District 16 ====
Summary of the 10 September 2023 State Assembly of the Republic of Bashkortostan election in Komsomolsky constituency No.16
Candidate	Party	Votes	%
Rustem Akhmadinurov (incumbent)	United Russia	15,175	71.73%
Rashid Ziyaltdinov	Communist Party	2,470	11.68%
Oleg Isayev	New People	1,177	5.56%
Artur Miftakhov	A Just Russia — For Truth	1,075	5.08%
Artyom Sherevkulov	Liberal Democratic Party	1,027	4.85%
Total		21,155	100%

==== District 17 ====
Summary of the 10 September 2023 State Assembly of the Republic of Bashkortostan election in Yubileyny constituency No.17
Candidate	Party	Votes	%
Gennady Sapozhnikov	United Russia	12,799	67.17%
Ilgam Galin (incumbent)	Communist Party	3,524	18.49%
Gilshat Kayumova	A Just Russia — For Truth	909	4.77%
Amal Osmanov	New People	863	4.53%
Artur Kinzikeyev	Liberal Democratic Party	639	3.35%
Total		19,054	100%

==== District 18 ====
Summary of the 10 September 2023 State Assembly of the Republic of Bashkortostan election in Devonsky constituency No.18
Candidate	Party	Votes	%
Aleksey Shmelyov	United Russia	18,308	70.29%
Konstantin Fedotov	Communist Party	3,486	13.38%
Aleksandr Kravtsov	A Just Russia — For Truth	2,062	7.92%
Maksim Kopeykin	Liberal Democratic Party	1,988	7.63%
Total		26,046	100%

==== District 19 ====
Summary of the 10 September 2023 State Assembly of the Republic of Bashkortostan election in Naryshevsky constituency No.19
Candidate	Party	Votes	%
Rail Fakhretdinov	Independent	19,590	61.46%
Damir Ibragimov	United Russia	3,301	10.36%
Dmitry Vaysbrot	New People	2,755	8.64%
Ilkhom Magdiyev	Communist Party	2,271	7.12%
Denis Dementyev	A Just Russia — For Truth	2,038	6.39%
Andrey Kozhevnikov	Liberal Democratic Party	1,715	5.38%
Total		31,876	100%

==== District 20 ====
Summary of the 10 September 2023 State Assembly of the Republic of Bashkortostan election in Promyshlenny constituency No.20
Candidate	Party	Votes	%
Yury Ignatyev	United Russia	11,567	55.08%
Igor Semyonov	Communist Party	3,364	16.02%
Viktoria Konstantinova	Liberal Democratic Party	2,211	10.53%
Rozalia Galiakhmetova	A Just Russia — For Truth	2,035	9.69%
Natalya Yermakova	New People	1,523	7.25%
Total		21,001	100%

==== District 21 ====
Summary of the 10 September 2023 State Assembly of the Republic of Bashkortostan election in Steklozavodskoy constituency No.21
Candidate	Party	Votes	%
Aleksandr Ivanov	United Russia	9,873	50.39%
Denis Pimenov	Liberal Democratic Party	4,566	23.30%
Aleksandr Ponyavin	New People	2,886	14.73%
Elvira Vagapova	A Just Russia — For Truth	1,933	9.87%
Total		19,594	100%

==== District 22 ====
Summary of the 10 September 2023 State Assembly of the Republic of Bashkortostan election in Sibaysky constituency No.22
Candidate	Party	Votes	%
Elza Mansurova	United Russia	23,793	80.79%
Viktor Tyurin	Liberal Democratic Party	3,839	13.04%
Gulsina Khusainova	A Just Russia — For Truth	1,625	5.52%
Total		29,449	100%

==== District 23 ====
Summary of the 10 September 2023 State Assembly of the Republic of Bashkortostan election in Nakhimovsky constituency No.23
Candidate	Party	Votes	%
Yulia Gerasimova	United Russia	16,140	67.13%
Kirill Abyzov	Liberal Democratic Party	2,332	9.70%
Artur Sagitov	Communist Party	2,307	9.59%
Ildar Gasanov	A Just Russia — For Truth	2,123	8.83%
Artyom Baymukhametov	New People	1,036	4.31%
Total		24,044	100%

==== District 24 ====
Summary of the 10 September 2023 State Assembly of the Republic of Bashkortostan election in Olkhovsky constituency No.24
Candidate	Party	Votes	%
Vladimir Anufriyev	Communist Party	13,543	55.81%
Yury Ivanov	United Russia	3,865	15.93%
Dmitry Kasyanov	New People	2,724	11.23%
Asker Aliyev	A Just Russia — For Truth	2,616	10.78%
Dmitry Arslangareyev	Liberal Democratic Party	1,418	5.84%
Total		24,265	100%

==== District 25 ====
Summary of the 10 September 2023 State Assembly of the Republic of Bashkortostan election in Otradovsky constituency No.25
Candidate	Party	Votes	%
Rinat Raymanov (incumbent)	United Russia	16,056	64.48%
Gyuzel Yusupova (incumbent)	Communist Party	2,597	10.43%
Dmitry Yakovlev	Liberal Democratic Party	2,580	10.36%
Olga Vakhitova	A Just Russia — For Truth	2,101	8.44%
Andrey Kasyanov	New People	1,476	5.93%
Total		24,899	100%

==== District 26 ====
Summary of the 10 September 2023 State Assembly of the Republic of Bashkortostan election in Shikhanovsky constituency No.26
Candidate	Party	Votes	%
Ruslan Akhmetov	United Russia	16,471	63.65%
Mansur Fazylov	Communist Party	2,894	11.18%
Regina Sagatdinova	A Just Russia — For Truth	2,428	9.38%
Bulat Khannanov	Liberal Democratic Party	2,141	8.27%%
Aleksandr Semibratchenko	New People	1,827	7.06%
Total		25,876	100%

==== District 27 ====
Summary of the 10 September 2023 State Assembly of the Republic of Bashkortostan election in Sterlitamaksky constituency No.27
Candidate	Party	Votes	%
Farit Gumerov	United Russia	26,687	76.23%
Tagir Gafarov	New People	4,508	12.88%
Rinat Amirov	Liberal Democratic Party	3,422	9.77%
Total		35,008	100%

==== District 28 ====
Summary of the 10 September 2023 State Assembly of the Republic of Bashkortostan election in Kizilsky constituency No.28
Candidate	Party	Votes	%
Gulnur Kulsarina (incumbent)	United Russia	17,884	63.72%
Salavat Zaynullin	Communist Party	5,169	18.42%
Rafis Yalalov	New People	3,399	12.11%
Vadim Rysenkov	Liberal Democratic Party	1,225	4.36%
Total		28,068	100%

==== District 29 ====
Summary of the 10 September 2023 State Assembly of the Republic of Bashkortostan election in Rayevsky constituency No.29
Candidate	Party	Votes	%
Rinat Zaynullin	United Russia	26,488	72.02%
Oleg Akhmetov	Liberal Democratic Party	4,483	12.19%
Regina Nasrtdinova	A Just Russia — For Truth	3,543	9.63%
Aleksandr Tishchenko	New People	1,848	5.02%
Total		36,778	100%

==== District 30 ====
Summary of the 10 September 2023 State Assembly of the Republic of Bashkortostan election in Belsky constituency No.30
Candidate	Party	Votes	%
Timergali Urazgulov	United Russia	25,715	68.39%
Khasan Ibrakov	Communist Party	5,158	13.72%
Vladlen Kurunov	Liberal Democratic Party	4,535	12.06%
Dmitry Bukhmastov	A Just Russia — For Truth	2,039	5.42%
Total		37,601	100%

==== District 31 ====
Summary of the 10 September 2023 State Assembly of the Republic of Bashkortostan election in Northern constituency No.31
Candidate	Party	Votes	%
Kashshaf Yamaletdinov	United Russia	32,901	86.07%
Marat Khayrullin	Liberal Democratic Party	3,119	8.16%
Radmir Musin	New People	1,941	5.08%
Total		38,227	100%

==== District 32 ====
Summary of the 10 September 2023 State Assembly of the Republic of Bashkortostan election in Tolbazinsky constituency No.32
Candidate	Party	Votes	%
Ramil Badretdinov	United Russia	30,428	87.67%
Nikita Shabanov	Liberal Democratic Party	3,934	11.33%
Total		34,709	100%

==== District 33 ====
Summary of the 10 September 2023 State Assembly of the Republic of Bashkortostan election in Sakmarsky constituency No.33
Candidate	Party	Votes	%
Ilnur Salikhov	United Russia	21,059	70.19%
Endzhe Vadutova	Communist Party	3,287	10.96%
Rasima Tusalina	A Just Russia — For Truth	3,150	10.50%
Dmitry Ivanov	Liberal Democratic Party	1,950	6.50%
Total		30,001	100%

==== District 34 ====
Summary of the 10 September 2023 State Assembly of the Republic of Bashkortostan election in Buzdyaksky constituency No.34
Candidate	Party	Votes	%
Aleksandr Andreyev	United Russia	31,478	75.09%
Irek Usmanov	Communist Party	5,444	12.99%
Salavat Khalikov	New People	2,690	6.42%
Leonid Yuldashev	Liberal Democratic Party	1,937	4.62%
Total		41,919	100%

==== District 35 ====
Summary of the 10 September 2023 State Assembly of the Republic of Bashkortostan election in Belebeyevsky constituency No.35
Candidate	Party	Votes	%
Ramil Badamshin	United Russia	26,424	73.09%
Ildar Valiyev	Independent	3,732	10.32%
Yevgeny Zakharov	Liberal Democratic Party	3,285	9.09%
Gaziz Sirayev	A Just Russia — For Truth	2,469	6.83%
Total		36,152	100%

==== District 36 ====
Summary of the 10 September 2023 State Assembly of the Republic of Bashkortostan election in Aslykulsky constituency No.36
Candidate	Party	Votes	%
Azat Mukhametzyanov	United Russia	26,661	74.35%
Yevgeny Fedorov	New People	3,219	8.98%
Denis Abdurashitov	Communist Party	3,121	8.70%
Ralia Surkova	Liberal Democratic Party	2,664	7.43%
Total		35,858	100%

==== District 37 ====
Summary of the 10 September 2023 State Assembly of the Republic of Bashkortostan election in Yuryuzansky constituency No.37
Candidate	Party	Votes	%
Anton Matrenin (incumbent)	United Russia	25,423	68.17%
Lilia Kutliakhmetova	Communist Party	5,252	14.08%
Yevgeny Kuznetsov	New People	3,816	10.23%
Aleksandr Rukomoynikov	Liberal Democratic Party	2,585	6.93%
Total		37,294	100%

==== District 38 ====
Summary of the 10 September 2023 State Assembly of the Republic of Bashkortostan election in Beloretsky constituency No.38
Candidate	Party	Votes	%
Aygiz Baymukhametov	United Russia	24,017	78.79%
Azat Mamatov	Liberal Democratic Party	2,416	7.93%
Denis Tsiplinov	A Just Russia — For Truth	1,830	6.00%
Georgy Shtyrlyayev	New People	1,715	5.63%
Total		30,481	100%

==== District 39 ====
Summary of the 10 September 2023 State Assembly of the Republic of Bashkortostan election in Metallurgichesky constituency No.39
Candidate	Party	Votes	%
Yuldash Yusupov	United Russia	24,830	77.03%
Yakov Kozlov	New People	3,904	12.11%
Rustam Nasyrov	Liberal Democratic Party	2,571	7.98%
Total		32,233	100%

==== District 40 ====
Summary of the 10 September 2023 State Assembly of the Republic of Bashkortostan election in Bazhenovsky constituency No.40
Candidate	Party	Votes	%
Yakov Kugubayev	United Russia	23,680	67.36%
Tanzilya Idrisova	Communist Party	4,862	13.83%
Vladimir Chernovsky	A Just Russia — For Truth	2,612	7.43%
Aleksandr Astakhov	New People	1,970	5.60%
Vladimir Malyshev	Liberal Democratic Party	1,683	4.79%
Total		35,157	100%

==== District 41 ====
Summary of the 10 September 2023 State Assembly of the Republic of Bashkortostan election in Rezyapovsky constituency No.41
Candidate	Party	Votes	%
Vadim Sokolov (incumbent)	United Russia	27,634	76.34%
Faat Latypov	Communist Party	4,176	11.54%
Anatoly Tikhonov	Liberal Democratic Party	2,362	6.53%
Yevgeny Rossikhin	New People	1,679	4.64%
Total		36,197	100%

==== District 42 ====
Summary of the 10 September 2023 State Assembly of the Republic of Bashkortostan election in Rodnikovy constituency No.42
Candidate	Party	Votes	%
Ilnur Urazmetov	Communist Party	30,568	72.97%
Ilya Gabitov	Liberal Democratic Party	4,851	11.58%
Alina Khabutdinova	A Just Russia — For Truth	3,741	8.93%
Sergey Matrosov	New People	2,305	5.50%
Total		41,893	100%

==== District 43 ====
Summary of the 10 September 2023 State Assembly of the Republic of Bashkortostan election in Pribelsky constituency No.43
Candidate	Party	Votes	%
Zulfia Gaysina	New People	14,440	45.34%
Yevgenia Berezina	United Russia	9,053	28.43%
Vyacheslav Ryabov	Liberal Democratic Party	4,005	12.58%
Pavel Chadov	Communist Party	3,906	12.27%
Total		31,846	100%

==== District 44 ====
Summary of the 10 September 2023 State Assembly of the Republic of Bashkortostan election in Buysky constituency No.44
Candidate	Party	Votes	%
Ilshat Vazigatov	United Russia	32,370	84.68%
Firuza Akmukhametova	Communist Party	3,020	7.90%
Insaf Ramazanov	New People	1,267	3.31%
Yevgeny Mukhamedzyanov	Liberal Democratic Party	1,242	3.25%
Total		38,228	100%

==== District 45 ====
Summary of the 10 September 2023 State Assembly of the Republic of Bashkortostan election in North-Eastern constituency No.45
Candidate	Party	Votes	%
Rinat Nagayev (incumbent)	United Russia	27,761	73.20%
Radul Shagimuratov	Communist Party	4,901	12.92%
Denis Yusupov	New People	2,727	7.19%
Denis Ivshin	Liberal Democratic Party	2,071	5.46%
Total		37,926	100%

==== District 46 ====
Summary of the 10 September 2023 State Assembly of the Republic of Bashkortostan election in Cheverevsky constituency No.46
Candidate	Party	Votes	%
Flaris Shaykhetdinov	United Russia	22,545	70.53%
Azat Khakov	Communist Party	4,178	13.07%
Vener Salimov	A Just Russia — For Truth	1,995	6.24%
Oleg Alyokhin	New People	1,795	5.62%
Danila Vyatkin	Liberal Democratic Party	1,088	3.40%
Total		31,963	100%

==== District 47 ====
Summary of the 10 September 2023 State Assembly of the Republic of Bashkortostan election in Yumaguzinsky constituency No.47
Candidate	Party	Votes	%
Rail Abdrakhimov	United Russia	27,016	83.20%
Ramil Trubkulov	Communist Party	3,551	10.94%
Yegor Gut	Liberal Democratic Party	1,621	4.99%
Total		32,471	100%

==== District 48 ====
Summary of the 10 September 2023 State Assembly of the Republic of Bashkortostan election in Iglinsky constituency No.48
Candidate	Party	Votes	%
Ildar Isangulov	Independent	13,694	50.83%
Pavel Zavadich	Liberal Democratic Party	4,502	16.71%
Yan Ternovsky	United Russia	4,055	15.05%
Svetlana Nikitina	A Just Russia — For Truth	3,034	11.26%
Veronika Vasina	New People	1,287	4.78%
Total		26,941	100%

==== District 49 ====
Summary of the 10 September 2023 State Assembly of the Republic of Bashkortostan election in Ishimbaysky constituency No.49
Candidate	Party	Votes	%
Aleksandr Rabotyayev (incumbent)	United Russia	24,998	72.99%
Anastasia Yarygina	Communist Party	5,116	14.94%
Ayrat Khabirov	Liberal Democratic Party	2,421	7.07%
Vladimir Kharitonov	New People	1,420	4.15%
Total		34,248	100%

==== District 50 ====
Summary of the 10 September 2023 State Assembly of the Republic of Bashkortostan election in Krasnokholmsky constituency No.50
Candidate	Party	Votes	%
Tamara Tansykkuzhina (incumbent)	United Russia	27,003	81.07%
Tatyana Kirsanova	A Just Russia — For Truth	2,160	6.48%
Maksim Nekrasov	New People	2,043	6.13%
Yury Rudakov	Liberal Democratic Party	1,811	5.44%
Total		33,309	100%

==== District 51 ====
Summary of the 10 September 2023 State Assembly of the Republic of Bashkortostan election in Yermolayevsky constituency No.51
Candidate	Party	Votes	%
Ruzalia Khismatullina (incumbent)	United Russia	27,177	80.77%
Ilshat Ilyasov	Communist Party	3,719	11.05%
Svetlana Khalitova	Liberal Democratic Party	1,406	4.18%
Aleksey Zhurenkov	New People	1,130	3.36%
Total		33,646	100%

==== District 52 ====
Summary of the 10 September 2023 State Assembly of the Republic of Bashkortostan election in Nugushsky constituency No.52
Candidate	Party	Votes	%
Ramazan Ramazanov (incumbent)	United Russia	20,804	76.92%
Timur Kamilov	A Just Russia — For Truth	2,801	10.36%
Albert Zaynagabdinov	Communist Party	1,828	6.76%
Kirill Kondratyev	Liberal Democratic Party	781	2.89%
Ilgiz Davletshin	New People	604	2.23%
Total		27,045	100%

==== District 53 ====
Summary of the 10 September 2023 State Assembly of the Republic of Bashkortostan election in Tuymazinsky constituency No.53
Candidate	Party	Votes	%
Ramil Mamleyev	United Russia	23,547	71.83%
Timur Gallyamov	New People	3,309	10.09%
Roza Nabiullina	Liberal Democratic Party	2,994	9.13%
Ruslan Sharapov	A Just Russia — For Truth	2,610	7.96%
Total		32,780	100%

==== District 54 ====
Summary of the 10 September 2023 State Assembly of the Republic of Bashkortostan election in Ufimsky constituency No.54
Candidate	Party	Votes	%
Vilory Ugarov	United Russia	22,544	69.67%
Ildus Ulmutayev	Communist Party	4,004	12.37%
Regina Belousova	Liberal Democratic Party	2,951	9.12%
Sergey Nazarov	A Just Russia — For Truth	2,653	8.20%
Total		32,360	100%

==== District 55 ====
Summary of the 10 September 2023 State Assembly of the Republic of Bashkortostan election in Iremelsky constituency No.55
Candidate	Party	Votes	%
Zakaria Gibadullin (incumbent)	United Russia	26,503	72.14%
Ruslan Zaynikeyev	Liberal Democratic Party	9,602	26.14%
Total		36,737	100%

== See also ==
- 2023 Russian regional elections
