= Sterlitamak constituency =

Sterlitamak single-member constituency
- Constituency of the Russian State Duma

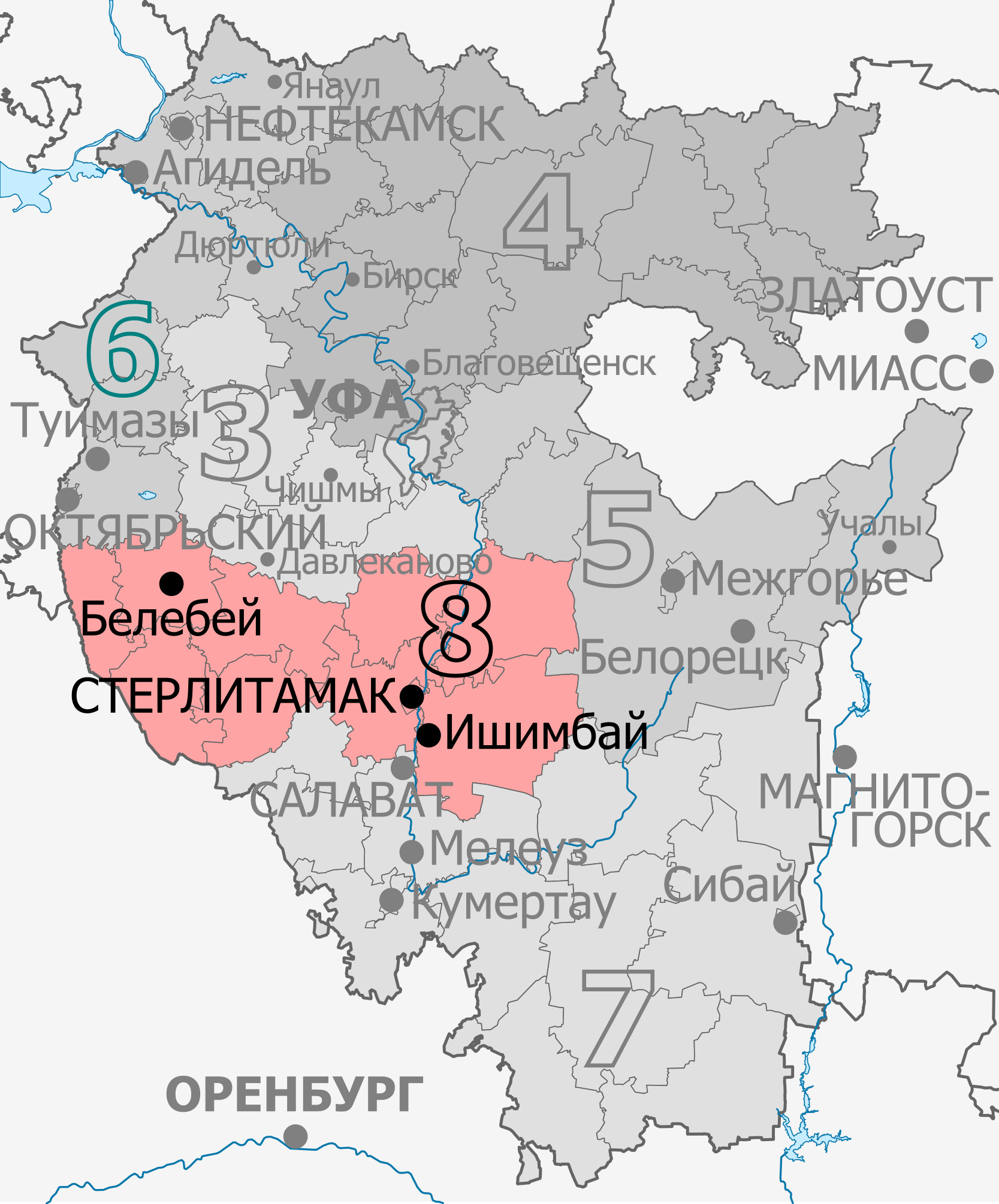
- Constituency boundaries since 2016
- Deputy: Gulnur Kulsarina; United Russia
- Federal subject: Republic of Bashkortostan
- Districts: Alsheyevsky, Aurgazinsky, Belebeyevsky, Bizhbulyaksky, Gafuriysky, Ishimbaysky, Miyakinsky, Sterlitamak, Sterlitamaksky, Yermekeyevsky
- Voters: 479,386 (2026)

The Sterlitamak constituency (No.8 (Note: No.6 in 1993-1995, No.7 in 1995-2003)) is a Russian legislative constituency in Bashkortostan. The constituency covers south-central Bashkiria and anchors in Sterlitamak.

The constituency has been represented since 2026 by United Russia deputy Gulnur Kulsarina, former Member of State Assembly of the Republic of Bashkortostan and Defenders of the Fatherland state fund regional director, who won the open seat, succeeding one-term United Russia incumbent Dinar Gilmutdinov.

== Boundaries ==
1993–2003: Aurgazinsky District, Fyodorovsky District, Gafuriysky District, Ishimbay, Ishimbaysky District, Salavat, Sterlibashevsky District, Sterlitamak, Sterlitamaksky District
The constituency was centred on a major industrial city of Sterlitamak in central Bashkiria and surrounding rural areas, including petrochemical and oil-refining towns of Ishimbay and Salavat.

2003–2007: Bizhbulyaksky District, Ishimbay, Ishimbaysky District, Miyakinsky District, Salavat, Sterlibashevsky District, Sterlitamak, Sterlitamaksky District
The constituency was slightly altered after the 2003 redistricting, losing Aurgazinsky, Fyodorovsky, Gafuriysky districts to Kirovsky, Kumertau, Kalininsky constituencies, respectively. Sterlitamak constituency was pushed to the west, gaining rural Bizhbulyaksky and Miyakinsky districts from the former Tuymazy constituency.

2016–present: Alsheyevsky District, Aurgazinsky District, Belebeyevsky District, Bizhbulyaksky District, Gafuriysky District, Ishimbaysky District, Miyakinsky District, Sterlitamak, Sterlitamaksky District, Yermekeyevsky District
The constituency was re-created for the 2016 election and remained centred on Sterlitamak. The constituency lost Salavat and Sterlibashevsky District to Salavat constituency and was instead pushed to the west to Belebey and Yermekeyevo from the former Kirovsky and Sovetsky constituencies.

== Members elected ==
Election	Member	Party
1993	Yury Utkin	Independent
1995	Yury Utkin	Independent
1999	Midkhat Khakimov	Independent
2003	Anatoly Starkov	United Russia
2007	Proportional representation - no election by constituency	
2011	Proportional representation - no election by constituency	
2016	Aleksey Izotov	United Russia
2021	Dinar Gilmutdinov	United Russia
2026	Gulnur Kulsarina	United Russia

== Election results ==
=== 1993 ===
==== Declared candidates ====
- Yury Beloglazov (Independent), former People's Deputy of Russia (1990–1993), transportation executive
- Mikhail Davydov (Independent), Kuybyshev Railway Bashkortostan division official
- Sergey Kalentyev (YaBL), businessman
- Rustem Kuzbekov (Independent), Member of Supreme Council of Bashkortostan (1990–present), neurologist
- Grigory Rutman (Independent), petrochemical plant director
- Timirkhan Sabirov (Independent), prosecutor
- Anatoly Starkov (Independent), union leader
- Yury Utkin (Independent), Mayor of Ishimbay (1986–present)
- Nazhip Valitov (PRES), chemistry professor

==== Withdrawn candidates ====
- Anatoly Barsukov (Independent), former People's Deputy of Russia (1990–1993), transportation executive

==== Results ====
Summary of the 12 December 1993 Russian legislative election in the Sterlitamak constituency
Candidate	Party	Votes	%
Yury Utkin	Independent	124,185	44.05%
Grigory Rutman	Independent	40,738	14.45%
Rustem Kuzbekov	Independent	16,135	5.72%
Anatoly Starkov	Independent	16,070	5.70%
Yury Beloglazov	Independent	15,304	5.43%
Timirkhan Sabirov	Independent	13,517	4.80%
Mikhail Davydov	Independent	6,246	2.22%
Nazhip Valitov	Party of Russian Unity and Accord	5,921	2.10%
Sergey Kalentyev	Yavlinsky–Boldyrev–Lukin	4,698	1.67%
against all		13,325	4.73%
Total		281,897	100%

=== 1995 ===
==== Declared candidates ====
- Aleksey Kirillov (Independent), State Committee of Russia for Defense Industry official
- Vilkim Maksyutov (Independent), former First Secretary of the CPSU Baymaksky District Committee (1964–1969), associate professor of economics
- Shamil Mingaleyev (Independent), entrepreneur
- Vyacheslav Petrov (LDPR), aide to State Duma member
- Svetlana Pronina (Women of Russia), education union leader
- Yury Utkin (Independent), incumbent Member of State Duma (1994–present)

==== Results ====
Summary of the 17 December 1995 Russian legislative election in the Sterlitamak constituency
Candidate	Party	Votes	%
Yury Utkin (incumbent)	Independent	172,759	51.27%
Svetlana Pronina	Women of Russia	67,929	20.16%
Shamil Mingaleyev	Independent	27,749	8.24%
Vilkim Maksyutov	Independent	23,770	7.05%
Aleksey Kirillov	Independent	10,345	3.07%
Vyacheslav Petrov	Liberal Democratic Party	9,869	2.93%
against all		20,321	6.03%
Total		336,933	100%

=== 1999 ===
==== Declared candidates ====
- Midkhat Khakimov (Independent), Deputy Mayor of Sterlitamak (1995–present)
- Rashit Khuzhin (Independent), union leader
- Radik Kuramshin (NDR), insurance businessman
- Aleksandr Ruban (KTR–zSS), chemical plant foreman
- Yury Utkin (Independent), incumbent Member of State Duma (1994–present)

==== Failed to qualify ====
- Aleftina Ivanova (Independent), physicist
- Aleksey Kirillov (KRO-Boldyrev), 1995 candidate for this seat
- Aleksandr Tsofnas (Yabloko), manager

==== Did not file ====
- Rasikh Akchurin (Nikolayev–Fyodorov Bloc), businessman
- Mars Batyrov (Independent), nonprofit chairman
- Gennady Dmitriyev (Independent)
- Vladimir Kosobokov (LDPR), aide to State Duma member
- Aleksey Kovalsky (Independent), businessman
- Viktor Lopukhov (ROS), Member of State Assembly of the Republic of Bashkortostan (1995–present)
- Aleksey Malyavko (Independent)
- Gennady Romanov (Independent)
- Stanislav Volkolupov (DN)

==== Results ====
Summary of the 19 December 1999 Russian legislative election in the Sterlitamak constituency
Candidate	Party	Votes	%
Midkhat Khakimov	Independent	144,028	41.72%
Rashit Khuzhin	Independent	94,365	27.34%
Yury Utkin (incumbent)	Independent	35,037	10.15%
Aleksandr Ruban	Communists and Workers of Russia - for the Soviet Union	30,013	8.69%
Radik Kuramshin	Our Home – Russia	6,388	1.85%
against all		30,868	8.94%
Total		345,215	100%

=== 2003 ===
==== Declared candidates ====
- Aleksey Aleksandrov (Independent), television executive, municipal deputy
- Robert Bikanasov (SPS), businessman
- Salavat Dautov (Independent), Member of State Assembly of the Republic of Bashkortostan (1995–present)
- Anton Gugenheimer (ORP Rus'), unemployed
- Farit Idrisov (VR–ES), corporate executive
- Yury Medvedev (Independent), Member of State Assembly of the Republic of Bashkortostan (2003–present), businessman
- Farit Minibayev (CPRF), attorney
- Anatoly Starkov (United Russia), Member of Naumovka Rural Council, chemical executive, 1993 candidate for this seat

==== Withdrawn candidates ====
- Aleksey Yurchenko (LDPR), construction executive

==== Failed to qualify ====
- Aleksandr Ruban (RKRP-RPK), lab deputy head, 1999 candidate for this seat

==== Did not file ====
- Safiulla Gainullin (APR), sovkhoz director
- Aleksandr Poluektov (KPE), corporate executive
- Yury Utkin (RPP-PSS), former Member of State Duma (1994–1999)

==== Declined ====
- Midkhat Khakimov (Independent), incumbent Member of State Duma (2000–present)

==== Results ====
Summary of the 7 December 2003 Russian legislative election in the Sterlitamak constituency
Candidate	Party	Votes	%
Anatoly Starkov	United Russia	176,694	51.82%
Salavat Dautov	Independent	34,341	10.07%
Yury Medvedev	Independent	30,264	8.88%
Farit Minibayev	Communist Party	27,783	8.15%
Aleksey Aleksandrov	Independent	15,419	4.52%
Robert Bikanasov	Union of Right Forces	8,157	2.39%
Farit Idrisov	Great Russia – Eurasian Union	4,638	1.36%
Anton Gugenheimer	United Russian Party Rus'	1,560	0.46%
against all		29,502	8.65%
Total		341,376	100%

=== 2016 ===
==== Declared candidates ====
- Veronika Ananyeva (LDPR), aide to State Duma member Ivan Sukharev
- Yury Biryuzov (CPCR), Member of Tuymazinsky District Council (2013–present), afterschool teacher
- Azamat Gubaidullin (Party of Growth), nonprofit president
- Aleksey Izotov (United Russia), Mayor of Sterlitamak (2010–present)
- Rufina Shagapova (The Greens), Member of State Assembly of the Republic of Bashkortostan (2013–present)
- Vadim Starov (CPRF), Deputy Chairman of the State Assembly of the Republic of Bashkortostan (2013–present), Member of the State Assembly (2008–present), lawyer
- Nurislam Usmanov (Rodina), retired militsiya colonel, 2014 Dignity presidential candidate

==== Withdrawn candidates ====
- Oleg Bukharin (A Just Russia), individual entrepreneur (died August 19, 2016)

==== Failed to qualify ====
- Bulat Baidavletov (Independent), industrial executive
- Fanzia Sharipova (Independent), pensioner

==== Declined ====
- Marina Bortova (United Russia), chemical executive (withdrew from the primary)
- Konstantin Kanunnikov (United Russia), Member of State Assembly of the Republic of Bashkortostan (2013–present) (lost the primary, ran on the party list)
- Rustem Ishmukhametov (United Russia), Member of State Duma (2014–present) (lost the primary, ran on the party list)
- Tamara Tansykkuzhina (United Russia), 2001–2004, 2007 and 2011 World Champion international draughts player (lost the primary)

==== Results ====
Summary of the 18 September 2016 Russian legislative election in the Sterlitamak constituency
Candidate	Party	Votes	%
Aleksey Izotov	United Russia	188,614	47.85%
Vadim Starov	Communist Party	95,266	24.17%
Rufina Shagapova	The Greens	48,076	12.20%
Veronika Ananyeva	Liberal Democratic Party	18,572	4.71%
Yury Biryuzov	Communists of Russia	16,273	4.13%
Azamat Gubaidullin	Party of Growth	14,565	3.70%
Nurislam Usmanov	Rodina	10,426	2.65%
Total		394,171	100%

=== 2021 ===
==== Declared candidates ====
- Vladimir Agafonov (Rodina), prison vocational school teacher
- Dinar Gilmutdinov (United Russia), former Chief State Automobile Inspector of Bashkortostan (2005–2021)
- Vadim Iskandarov (A Just Russia), construction businessman
- Ildar Iskhakov (RPPSS), unemployed
- Aigul Khabibrakhmanova (New People), business development executive
- Vyacheslav Ryabov (LDPR), Member of State Assembly of the Republic of Bashkortostan (2018–present)
- Emil Shaimardanov (Yabloko), pensioner
- Gyuzel Yusupova (CPRF), Member of State Assembly of the Republic of Bashkortostan (2018–present), private clinic chief doctor

==== Withdrawn candidates ====
- Yelena Motova (Party of Growth), individual entrepreneur

==== Declined ====
- Aleksey Izotov (United Russia), incumbent Member of State Duma (2016–present)

==== Results ====
Summary of the 17-19 September 2021 Russian legislative election in the Sterlitamak constituency
Candidate	Party	Votes	%
Dinar Gilmutdinov	United Russia	164,753	53.78%
Vadim Iskandarov	A Just Russia — For Truth	42,880	14.00%
Gyuzel Yusupova	Communist Party	41,010	13.39%
Vyacheslav Ryabov	Liberal Democratic Party	14,903	4.86%
Ildar Iskhakov	Party of Pensioners	12,312	4.02%
Aigul Khabibrakhmanova	New People	11,281	3.68%
Vladimir Agafonov	Rodina	10,330	3.37%
Emil Shaimardanov	Yabloko	3,529	1.15%
Total		306,336	100%

=== 2026 ===
==== Declared candidates ====
- Vladimir Agafonov (Rodina), college lecturer
- Ilshat Bikkinin (RPPSS), construction businessman
- Ruslan Galikeyev (New People), Member of Sterlitamak Council (2024–present), entrepreneur
- Mikhail Kazachkov (CPRF), Member of Sterlitamak Council (2024–present), businessman
- Gulnur Kulsarina (United Russia), former Member of State Assembly of the Republic of Bashkortostan (2018–2026), Defenders of the Fatherland state fund regional director
- Dmitry Smirnov (A Just Russia), Member of Mishkinsky District Council (2020–present)
- Pavel Zavadich (LDPR), Member of Ufa Council (2023–present), former Member of State Assembly of the Republic of Bashkortostan (2018–2023), paralegal

==== Declined ====
- Dinar Gilmutdinov (United Russia), incumbent Member of State Duma (2021–present)
- Azat Mukhametzyanov (United Russia), Member of State Assembly of the Republic of Bashkortostan (2023–present), chief doctor of the republican clinical infectious diseases hospital (lost the primary)
- Irek Zaripov (United Russia), former Member of State Assembly of the Republic of Bashkortostan (2013–2023), 2010 Paralympic champion biathlete and cross-country skier (lost the primary)

==== Results ====
Summary of the 18-20 September 2026 Russian legislative election in the Sterlitamak constituency
Candidate	Party	Votes	%
Gulnur Kulsarina	United Russia	257,867	65.98%
Mikhail Kazachkov	Communist Party	33,017	8.45%
Pavel Zavadich	Liberal Democratic Party	32,196	8.24%
Ruslan Galikeyev	New People	21,235	5.43%
Ilshat Bikkinin	Party of Pensioners	16,387	4.19%
Vladimir Agafonov	Rodina	14,690	3.76%
Dmitry Smirnov	A Just Russia	12,767	3.27%
Total		390,855	100%
