= List of chairmen of the State Assembly of Bashkortostan =

Chairmen of the State Assembly of Bashkortostan

== Chairmen of the Supreme Council ==
Name	Entered office	Left office
Murtaza Rakhimov	October 11, 1990	December 17, 1993
Yury Demin (acting)	January 1994	1995

== Chairmen of the State Assembly of Bashkortostan ==
Name	Entered office	Left office
Mikhail Zaitsev	March 21, 1995	March 29, 1999
Konstantin Tolkachyov	March 29, 1999	May 4, 2026

== See also ==
- List of Chairmen of the Chamber of Representatives of the State Assembly of Bashkortostan
- List of Chairmen of the Legislative Chamber of the State Assembly of Bashkortostan
