= Blagoveshchenka =

Blagoveshchenka (Russian: Благовещенка) is a toponym:

- Blagoveshchenka, Altai Krai, an urban locality Blagoveshchensky District, Altai Krai, Russia
- Blagoveshchenka, Kyrgyzstan, a village in Kyrgyzstan
- Blagoveshchenka (Novosibirsk Oblast), a village in Kupinsky District, Novosibirsk Oblast, Russia

== See also ==
- Blagoveshchensk (inhabited locality)
- Blagoveshchensky (disambiguation)
