= Midkhat Khakimov =

Russian politician (1940–2024)

- Мидхат Хакимов

Member of the State Duma for Sterlitamak
- In office 18 January 2000 – 7 December 2003
- Preceded by: Yury Utkin
- Succeeded by: Anatoly Starkov

Personal details
- Born: Midkhat Gainanovich Khakimov; 25 February 1940 Nizhniye Lekandy, Bashkir ASSR, Russian SFSR, USSR
- Died: 2 October 2024 (aged 84)
- Party: Independent

Midkhat Gainanovich Khakimov (Russian: Мидхат Гайнанович Хакимов; 25 February 1940; Nizhniye Lekandy, Aurgazinsky District – 2 October 2024) was a Russian politician. An independent, he served in the State Duma from 2000 to 2003.

From 2005 he is an honorary citizen of Aurgazinsky District.

Khakimov died on 2 October 2024, at the age of 84.
