= Lilia Gumerova =

Russian politician (born 1972)

- Лилия Гумерова
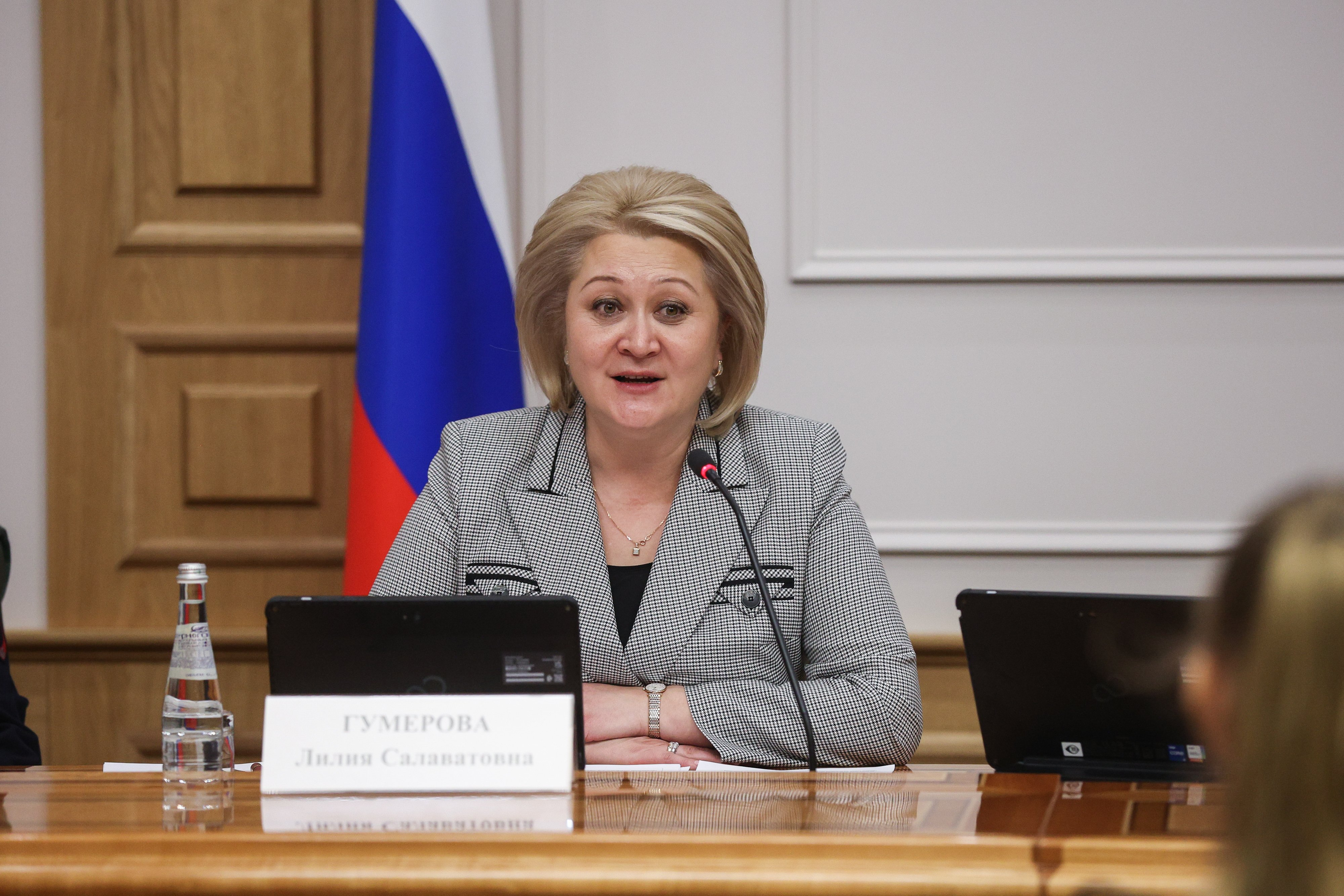

Russian Federation Senator from Bashkortostan
- Incumbent
- Assumed office 25 September 2014 Serving with Irek Yalalov
- Preceded by: Anatoly Bondaruk

Chair of the Federation Council Committee on Science, Education and Culture
- Incumbent
- Assumed office 25 September 2019

Deputy Prime Minister of Bashkorstan
- In office 24 October 2012 – 25 September 2014

Member of the State Assembly of Bashkorstan
- In office 13 March 2011 – 24 October 2012

Personal details
- Born: Lilia Gumerova; 16 December 1975 (age 50) Uchaly, Bashkir ASSR, Soviet Union (now Bashkortostan, Russia)
- Party: United Russia
- Education: Bashkir State Pedagogical University

Lilia Salavatovna Gumerova (Russian: Лилия Салаватовна Гумерова; born 16 December 1972) is a Russian politician serving as a senator from Bashkortostan since 2014.

She previously served as Deputy Prime Minister of Bashkortostan, state legislature, children's rights commissioner and local administrator. Prior to her career in government, Gumerova was a psychology teacher.

== Biography ==
Lilia Gumerova was born on 16 December 1972 in the Bashkir town of Uchaly in the Uchalinsky District. In 1994, she graduated from the Bashkir State Pedagogical University.

She later started working as a teacher of psychology at secondary school No. 10 in Uchaly. From 2001 to 2005, she worked as a head of the information and analytical department of the administration of the Uchalinsky District.

From 2010 to 2011, she was the Commissioner for Children's Rights in Bashkortostan.

On 13 March 2011 she was elected member of the State Assembly of the Republic of Bashkortostan.

On 24 October 2012, she was appointed Deputy Prime Minister of Bashkortostan.

On 25 September 2014, she was appointed to represent her region in the Federation Council by the Head of the Republic. On 25 September 2019, she was re-appointed for the same position and chosen as chair of the science, education and culture committee.

As a senator, Gumerova effectively voted to recognise the independence of the Donetsk and Lugansk people's republics from Ukraine. As a result, she was placed under sanctions by the European Union, United Kingdom, United States, Canada, Switzerland, Australia, Ukraine and New Zealand.
