= Pavel Kachkayev =

Russian politician (1951–2025)

- Павел Качкаев
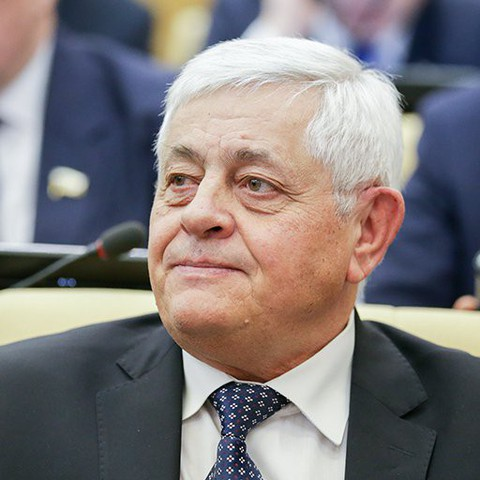
- Kachkayev in 2016

Member of the State Duma
- In office 21 December 2011 – 5 May 2025
- Preceded by: Multi-member district
- Succeeded by: Denis Chernavin
- Constituency: Ufa (No. 3) (2016-2025); Party List (2011-2016)

Mayor of Ufa
- In office May 2003 – 3 December 2011
- Preceded by: Rauf Nugumanov
- Succeeded by: Irek Yalalov

Personal details
- Born: 4 October 1951 Chernigovka, Chishminsky District, Bashkir ASSR, Russian SFSR, USSR
- Died: 5 May 2025 (aged 73) Bulgakovo, Bashkortostan, Russia
- Party: United Russia
- Education: Ufa State Aviation Technical University

Pavel Rurikovich Kachkayev (Russian: Павел Рюрикович Качкаев; 4 October 1951 – 5 May 2025) was a Russian politician who was a deputy of the 6th, 7th, and 8th State Dumas.

In 1994–1995, he was the head of the Leninsky district in Ufa. From 1995 to 2001, he was the first deputy to the head of administration of Ufa. In 2001, Kachkayev was appointed Minister of Housing and Communal Services of Bashkortostan. He left the post in 2003 as he was appointed the head of the administration of Ufa. In 2011, he was elected deputy of the 6th State Duma from the party lists for Bashkortostan. He was re-elected in 2016 and 2021 for the 7th and 8th State Dumas respectively.

Kachkayev died following a cardiac arrest in the village of Bulgakovo, Bashkortostan, on 5 May 2025. He was 73.

== Personal life ==
He was married and had two sons and seven grandchildren.

== Sanctions ==
On February 23, 2022, he was included in the European Union's sanctions list for actions and policies that undermine the territorial integrity, sovereignty, and independence of Ukraine and further destabilize the country.

On February 24, 2022, he was added to Canada’s sanctions list of "close associates of the regime" for voting in favor of recognizing the independence of the "so-called republics in Donetsk and Luhansk".

On March 24, 2022, in the context of Russia's invasion of Ukraine, he was sanctioned by the United States for "complicity in Putin’s war" and "supporting the Kremlin’s efforts to invade Ukraine". The U.S. Department of State stated that members of the State Duma use their powers to persecute dissenters and political opponents, violate freedom of information, and restrict the human rights and fundamental freedoms of Russian citizens.

On similar grounds, he was sanctioned by Switzerland on February 25, 2022; by Australia on February 26, 2022; by the United Kingdom on March 11, 2022; by New Zealand on March 18, 2022; and by Japan on April 12, 2022. By decree of Ukrainian president Volodymyr Zelenskyy, he has also been under Ukrainian sanctions since September 7, 2022.

== Awards ==
- Order of Friendship
- Russian Federation Presidential Certificate of Honour
