= Ulfat Mustafin =

Russian politician and scientist (1959–2020)

- Ульфат Мустафин

6th Mayor of Ufa
- In office 29 October 2018 – 29 October 2020
- Preceded by: Irek Yalalov
- Succeeded by: Sergey Grekov

Personal details
- Born: 4 May 1959; Staroikhsanovo, Chekmagushevsky District, Bashkir ASSR, RSFSR, Soviet Union
- Died: 29 October 2020 (aged 61); Moscow, Russia

Ulfat Mansurovich Mustafin (Russian: Ульфат Мансурович Мустафин; 4 May 1959 – 29 October 2020) was a Russian politician, manager and civil servant. He served as mayor of Ufa, capital of the Republic of Bashkortostan, from 2018 until his death in office from COVID-19 during the COVID-19 pandemic in 2020.

== Biography ==
Mustafin was born on 4 May 1959, in the village of Staroikhsanovo in the Chekmagushevsky District of the Bashkir Autonomous Soviet Socialist Republic. After graduating from Ike Bashir High School in 1976, he entered the Hong Ufa College of Fine Arts. In May 1977, he was drafted into the Soviet Army. From May 1979 to March 1981, he continued his studies at the Ufa Institute of Light Industry, where he graduated with honors in the field of fine arts and technology.

He started his business career in June 1981 at the Network Operations Department in the Kirov district of Ufa. In 1992 he graduated from the Ufa State Aviation Technical University.

He subsequently served on the executive committee of the Kirov District Council, as Head of the Department of Communal Services, Deputy Head of the Department of Networking Enterprises and in the Mayor's Office of Engineering Supply, as well as Chief Engineer of the Ufagaz branch of the AIS Gas Service. From 2003 to 2008 he headed the Department of Finance and Economics of the Government of the President of the Republic of Bashkortostan. On May 28, 2008, he was relieved of his post by the President of the Republic of Bashkortostan. From 2010 to 2013 he held various positions in the management of Rosatom. In 2013, he returned to Ufa working for Gazprom.

On 29 October 2018 Mustafin was elected mayor of Ufa, capital city of the Republic of Bashkortostan.

He died from COVID-19 on 29 October 2020, at age 61 during the COVID-19 pandemic in Russia, after being hospitalized in Moscow for 35 days.
