= Blagoveshchensky, Russia =

Blagoveshchensky (Russian: Благове́щенский; masculine), Blagoveshchenskaya (Благове́щенская; feminine), or Blagoveshchenskoye (Благове́щенское; neuter) is the name of several rural localities in Russia:

- Blagoveshchensky, Republic of Bashkortostan, a khutor in Zilairsky Selsoviet of Zilairsky District of the Republic of Bashkortostan
- Blagoveshchensky, Bryansk Oblast, a settlement in Berezhansky Selsoviet of Karachevsky District of Bryansk Oblast
- Blagoveshchensky, Kursk Oblast, a settlement in Volkovsky Selsoviet of Zheleznogorsky District of Kursk Oblast
- Blagoveshchensky, Buturlinovsky District, Voronezh Oblast, a settlement in Karaychevskoye Rural Settlement of Buturlinovsky District of Voronezh Oblast
- Blagoveshchensky, Kalacheyevsky District, Voronezh Oblast, a khutor in Maninskoye Rural Settlement of Kalacheyevsky District of Voronezh Oblast
- Blagoveshchenskoye, Kirov Oblast, a selo in Yumsky Rural Okrug of Svechinsky District of Kirov Oblast
- Blagoveshchenskoye, Kurgan Oblast, a selo in Blagoveshchensky Selsoviet of Shumikhinsky District of Kurgan Oblast
- Blagoveshchenskoye, Moscow Oblast, a village under the administrative jurisdiction of the town of Dmitrov in Dmitrovsky District of Moscow Oblast
- Blagoveshchenskoye, Nizhny Novgorod Oblast, a selo in Blagoveshchensky Selsoviet of Voskresensky District of Nizhny Novgorod Oblast
- Blagoveshchenskoye, Vladimir Oblast, a selo in Muromsky District of Vladimir Oblast
