= Blagoveshchensky District =

Location of Altai Krai in Russia

Location of Amur Oblast in Russia

Location of the Republic of Bashkortostan in Russia

Blagoveshchensky District is the name of several administrative and municipal districts in Russia. The name is generally derived from or related to the root "blagovesheniye" (good news).

- Blagoveshchensky District, Altai Krai, an administrative and municipal district of Altai Krai
- Blagoveshchensky District, Amur Oblast, an administrative and municipal district of Amur Oblast
- Blagoveshchensky District, Republic of Bashkortostan, an administrative and municipal district of the Republic of Bashkortostan

== See also ==
- Blagoveshchensky (disambiguation)
- Blagoveshchensk (inhabited locality)
- Blagoveshchenka
