= List of chairmen of the Legislative Chamber of the State Assembly of Bashkortostan =

Chairmen of the Legislative Chamber of the State Assembly of Bashkortostan

| Name | Entered office | Left office |
|---|---|---|
| Anas Khasanov | March 1995 | ? |
| Konstantin Tolkachev | March 1999 | Present |
