= Dinar Gilmutdinov =

Russian politician (born 1969)

- Динар Гильмутдинов
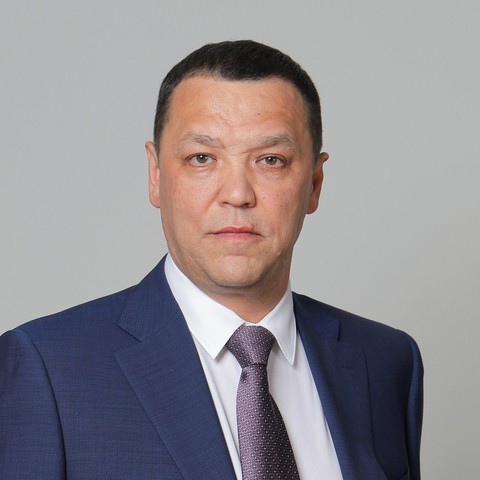

Member of the State Duma for Bashkortostan
- In office 12 October 2021 – 30 September 2026
- Preceded by: Aleksey Izotov
- Succeeded by: Gulnur Kulsarina
- Constituency: Sterlitamak (No. 8)

Personal details
- Born: 10 August 1969 (age 57) Chebykovo, Mishkinsky District, Bashkir ASSR, RSFSR, USSR
- Party: United Russia
- Education: Orenburg State Agrarian University

Dinar Zagitovich Gilmutdinov (Russian: Динар Загитович Гильмутдинов; born 10 August 1969, Chebykovo, Mishkinsky District, Republic of Bashkortostan) is a Russian politician who was a deputy of the 8th State Duma.

In 1991, he started working as an inspector of the road patrol service. In 1996, he was appointed as a deputy head of the Main Directorate for Traffic Safety in Ufa. From 2005 to 2021, he was the chief of the UGIBDD of the Ministry of Internal Affairs of Bashkortostan. He left the post in 2021 to become a deputy for the 8th State Duma from the Bashkortostan constituency.

== Sanctions ==
He was sanctioned by the UK government in 2022 in relation to the Russo-Ukrainian War.
