= Oleg Golov =

- Олег Голов
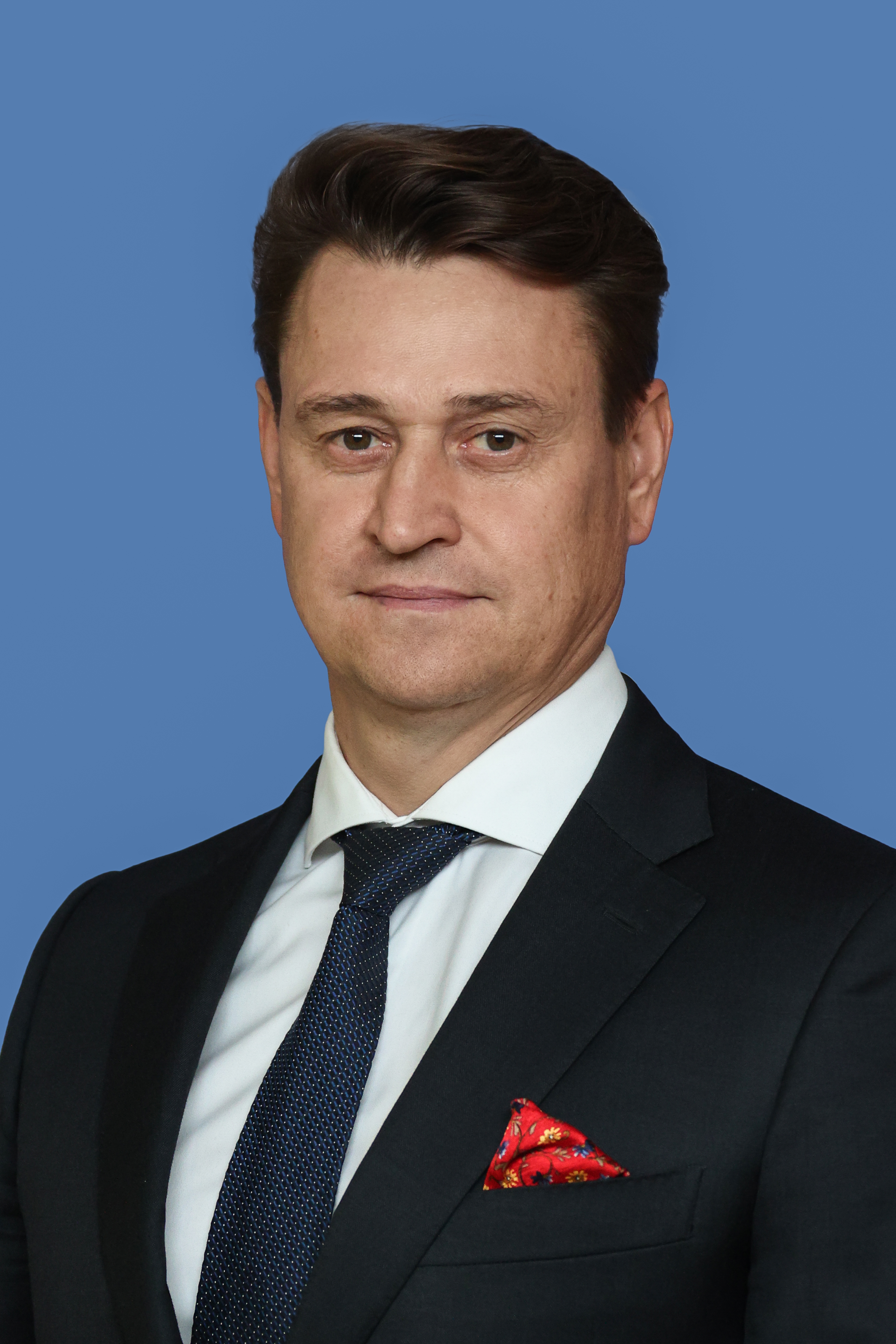

Senator from Bashkortostan
- Incumbent
- Assumed office 5 October 2023
- Preceded by: Irek Yalalov

Personal details
- Born: 11 August 1972 (age 53) Sterlitamak, RSFSR, Soviet Union
- Party: United Russia
- Education: Sterlitamak State Pedagogical Institute; Moscow Pedagogical University; Plekhanov Russian University of Economics

Oleg Yevgenyevich Golov (Russian: Олег Евгеньевич Голов; born August 11, 1972, Sterlitamak, RSFSR, USSR) is a Russian politician, since October 5, 2023, a senator of the Federation Council, a representative from the State Assembly of the Republic of Bashkortostan. He is a member of United Russia party.

== Biography ==
He was born in Sterlitamak, then part of the Bashkir SSR. In 1997, he graduated from the Sterlitamak State Pedagogical Institute with a degree in Labour, Applied Economics, and Entrepreneurship.

In 1997, he was an assistant in the Department of Production Fundamentals at Sterlitamak State Pedagogical University.

From 1997 to 2000, he was a full-time graduate student at Moscow Pedagogical University. In 2000, he defended his dissertation at Moscow Pedagogical University on "Enhancing the Technological Training of Students at a Pedagogical University". His supervisor was Doctor of Pedagogical Sciences, Professor Eduard Dmitrievich Novozhilov. He holds a PhD in Pedagogical Sciences.

From 2000 to 2002, he was a senior lecturer in the Department of Economics at Sterlitamak State Pedagogical University.

=== Head of the Blagoveshchensky District ===
On July 25, 2019, Golov was appointed acting head of the Blagoveshchensky District of the Republic of Bashkortostan. He replaced Farit Fazylov in this position ahead of schedule. The decision was made by the Council of Deputies of the Blagoveshchensky District, chaired by A.V. Pilyugin. A competition for the position was simultaneously held. From July to September 2019, Golov served as Deputy Head of the Blagoveshchensky District Administration for Construction and Housing and Utilities.

Since August 27, 2019, he has been Head of the Blagoveshchensky District Municipal Administration. He assumed the position under a contract with the Council of Deputies of the municipal district. He also headed the local branch of the United Russia party since October 18, 2019.

=== State Assembly of Bashkortostan ===
In the summer of 2023, during preparations for the elections to the 7th convocation of the State Assembly of Bashkortostan, he was included on the United Russia party's list of candidates. Pribelskaya was number one on the list in regional group No. 43. The general section of the United Russia list included R. F. Khabirov, A. R. Zagidullina, and A. A. Galeev. In the September 10, 2023, elections, United Russia received 68.92% of the votes on the list and won 41 of the 55 mandates. When the mandates were distributed, one was awarded to Oleg Golov.

On October 3, 2023, Oleg Golov resigned as head of the Blagoveshchensky District in connection with his transfer to an elected position in the State Assembly of the Republic of Bashkortostan.

On October 5, 2023, at the first meeting of the State Assembly - Kurultai, deputies, on the nomination of United Russia, elected Golov as the representative of the republic's State Council in the Federation Council. Ninety-three deputies voted for Golov, three voted against, six abstained, and two did not vote. In connection with his transfer to the Federation Council, Golov resigned his parliamentary powers and resigned his mandate.

=== Federation Council ===
Since October 5, 2023, he has been a senator of the Federation Council, representing the legislative body of state power of the Republic of Bashkortostan. In the Federation Council, he became a member of the Federation Council Committee on Federal Structure, Regional Policy, Local Self-Government, and Northern Affairs.
