= Blagoveshchensky =

== Toponymy ==
Blagoveshchensky (masculine), Blagoveshchenskaya (feminine), or Blagoveshchenskoye (neuter) may refer to:

- Blagoveshchensky District, name of several districts in Russia
- Blagoveshchenskoye, Kazakhstan, a locality in Aktobe Province, Kazakhstan
- Blagoveshchensky, Russia (Blagoveshchenskaya, Blagoveshchenskoye), name of several rural localities in Russia

== People ==
- Nikolai Blagoveshchensky (1837–1889), a Russian writer, journalist and ethnographer.
