= List of chairmen of the Chamber of Representatives of the State Assembly of Bashkortostan =

The following were chairmen of the Chamber of Representatives of the State Assembly of Bashkortostan.

Name	Entered office	Left office
Minnarais Ishmuratov	March 1995	March 1999
Konstantin Tolkachev	March 1999	Present
