= Irek Yalalov =

Russian politician (born 1961)

- Ирек Ялалов
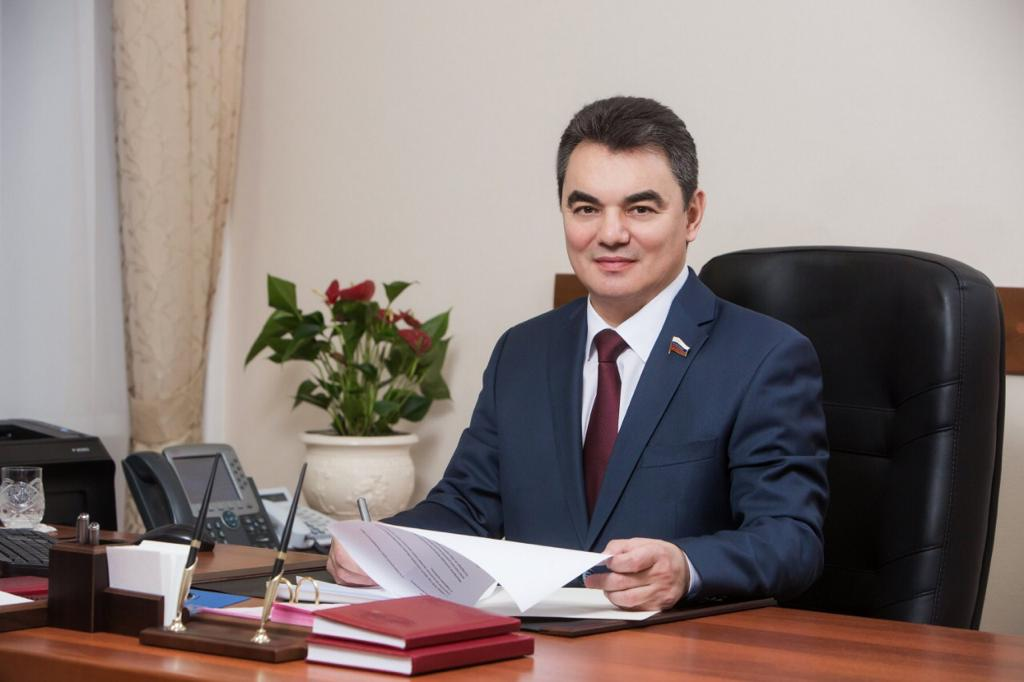

Russian Federation Senator from Bashkortostan
- In office 29 September 2018 – October 2023 Serving with Lilia Gumerova
- Preceded by: Rafail Zinurov
- Succeeded by: Oleg Golov

5th Mayor of Ufa
- In office 3 December 2011 (Note: Acting until 18 January 2012.) – 27 September 2018
- Preceded by: Pavel Kachkayev
- Succeeded by: Ulfat Mustafin

Bashkortostan Minister of Housing and Communal Services
- In office 2010–2011

Deputy Mayor of Ufa
- In office 2009–2010

Personal details
- Born: 27 January 1961 (age 65) Ufa, Bashkir ASSR, Russian SFSR, Soviet Union (now Bashkortostan, Russia)
- Party: United Russia

Irek Ishmukhametovich Yalalov (Bashkir: Ирек Ишмөхәмәт улы Ялалов, Russian: Ирек Ишмухаметович Ялалов; born 27 January 1961) is a Russian politician who serves as Russian Federation Senator from Bashkortostan since 2018. Yalalov served as Mayor of Ufa from 2012 to 2018 and Minister of Housing and Communal Services of Bashkortostan from 2010 to 2011. Prior to that, he was a local politician.

== Biography ==
Irek Yalalov was born in Ufa on 27 January 1961 to an ethnic Bashkir family. He is married and has two children.

Yalalov became acting Mayor of Ufa in 2011 and took over the position on a permanent basis in 2012. As Mayor, he was praised for an improvement in some infrastructure, improving the condition of the city's most notable park, helping increase investments in the city and introducing bike lanes on roads. However, he was criticised for failing to ensure snow was removed from roads (and simultaneously arguing against the use of studded tires arguing they asphalt concrete), poor responses to flooding, the closing of most trolleybus routes due to a lack of funding and not engaging with grassroots activists.

On 29 September 2018, Yalalov was appointed member of the Federation Council from his republic by the State Assembly.

Yalalov is a member of the ruling United Russia party. Following the 2022 Russian invasion of Ukraine, he was placed on the United Kingdom's sanction list.
