= Blagoveshchensk (inhabited locality) =

Blagoveshchensk is the name of several urban localities in Russia:

- Blagoveshchensk, a city and the administrative center of Amur Oblast
- Blagoveshchensk, Republic of Bashkortostan, a town in the Republic of Bashkortostan

== See also ==
- Blagoveshchensky (disambiguation)
- Blagoveshchenka
