= Yury Utkin =

Russian politician and political scientist

- Юрий Уткин

Member of the State Duma
- In office 11 January 1994 – 24 December 1999
- Constituency: Sterlitamak

Mayor of Ishimbay
- In office February 1992 – January 1994

Personal details
- Born: 6 April 1939 (age 86) Ishimbay, Bashkir ASSR, RSFSR, Soviet Union
- Awards: Order of the Badge of Honour

Yury Vasilyevich Utkin (Russian: Юрий Васильевич Уткин; born April 6, 1939) is a Russian political figure and political scientist. He was a member of the State Duma of the Russian Federation from 1993 to 1999. He is the author of many laws of the Russian Federation on problems of ecology. He is a doctor of philosophy, the Grand doctor of philosophy, professor, the founder of some machines for covering pipes. He is the author of many scientific papers and five books and monographs. He trained five Ph.Ds in Russia.
