= Blagoveshchenskoye, Kazakhstan =

Blagoveshchenskoye Ащысай Благовещенское بلاگوۆەششەنسكوە
- Location within Kazakhstan
- Coordinates: 49°39′06″N 56°22′13″E
- Country: Kazakhstan
- Region: Aktobe
- Elevation: 279 m (915 ft)
- Time zone: UTC+5 (West Kazakhstan Time)
  - Summer (DST): UTC+5 (West Kazakhstan Time)

Blagoveshchenskoye (Kazakh: Ащысай, Aşysai, بلاگوۆەششەنسكوە; Russian: Благовещенское, Blagoveshchenskoye) is a town in Aktobe Region, west Kazakhstan. It lies at an altitude of 279 m (915 ft).
