= Zhukovo, Republic of Bashkortostan =

Zhukovo Жуково
- Selo
- Location within Bashkortostan Location within Russia
- Coordinates: 54°39′N 55°45′E
- Country: Russia
- Region: Bashkortostan
- District: Ufimsky District
- Time zone: UTC+5:00

Zhukovo (Russian: Жуково) is a rural locality (a selo) and the administrative centre of Zhukovsky Selsoviet, Ufimsky District, Bashkortostan, Russia. The population was 1,685 as of 2010. There are 57 streets.

== Geography ==
Zhukovo is located 28 km southwest of Ufa (the district's administrative centre) by road. Mysovtsevo is the nearest rural locality.
