= Olkhovoye =

Olkhovoye Ольховое
- Selo
- Location within Bashkortostan Location within Russia
- Coordinates: 54°33′N 56°02′E
- Country: Russia
- Region: Bashkortostan
- District: Ufimsky District
- Time zone: UTC+5:00

Olkhovoye (Russian: Ольховое) is a rural locality (a selo) and the administrative centre of Olkhovsky Selsoviet, Ufimsky District, Bashkortostan, Russia. The population was 889 as of 2010. There are 15 streets.

== Geography ==
Olkhovoye is located 29 km south of Ufa (the district's administrative centre) by road. Starye Kiyeshki is the nearest rural locality.
