= Staroikhsanovo =

Staroikhsanovo Староихсаново
- Selo
- Location within Bashkortostan Location within Russia
- Coordinates: 55°04′N 55°03′E
- Country: Russia
- Region: Bashkortostan
- District: Chekmagushevsky District
- Time zone: UTC+5:00

Staroikhsanovo (Russian: Староихсаново; Bashkir: Иҫке Ихсан, İśke İxsan) is a rural locality (a selo) in Chekmagushevsky District, Bashkortostan, Russia. The population was 216 as of 2010. There are 4 streets.

== Geography ==
Staroikhsanovo is located 31 km southeast of Chekmagush (the district's administrative centre) by road. Starobashirovo is the nearest rural locality.
