= Alexander Yushchenko =

Russian politician

Alexander Yushchenko MP
- Александр Ющенко
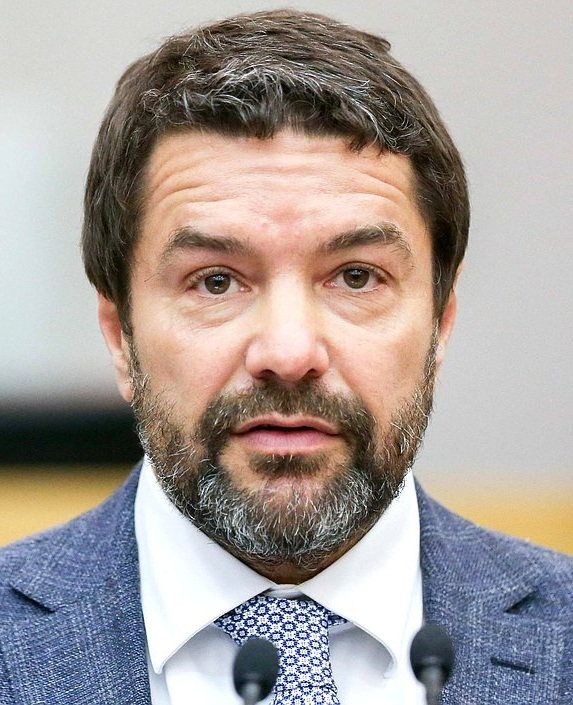

Member of the State Duma (Party List Seat)
- Incumbent
- Assumed office 21 December 2011

Personal details
- Born: 19 November 1969 (age 56) Mazyr, Gomel Region, Byelorussian SSR, USSR
- Party: Communist Party of the Russian Federation
- Education: A.F. Mozhaysky Military-Space Academy; Russian Academy of Public Administration; Moscow State Institute of International Relations

Alexander Andreyevich Yushchenko (Russian: Александр Андреевич Ющенко; born 19 November 1969, Mazyr, Gomel Region) is a Russian political figure and a deputy of the 6th, 7th, and 8th State Dumas.

In the 1990s, Yushchenko engaged in political activities and journalism. He worked with Alexander Nevzorov on the TV news program 600 Seconds. In 1995, he started working on information support of the Communist Party of the Russian Federation. He also served as an advisor to Gennady Zyuganov. In 2007, he headed the press services of the Communist Party. From 2007 to 2011, he was the deputy of the People's Khural of the Republic of Buryatia of the 4th convocation. From 2011 to 2016, he was the deputy of the 6th State Duma. In 2016 and 2021, he was re-elected deputy of the 7th and 8th State Dumas.

He was sanctioned by the UK government on 11 March 2022 in relation to the Russo-Ukrainian War.
