= Nizhniye Lekandy =

Nizhniye Lekandy Нижние Леканды
- Village
- Location within Bashkortostan Location within Russia
- Coordinates: 54°08′N 56°16′E
- Country: Russia
- Region: Bashkortostan
- District: Aurgazinsky District
- Time zone: UTC+5:00

Nizhniye Lekandy (Russian: Нижние Леканды; Bashkir: Түбәнге Ләкәнде, Tübänge Läkände; Tatar: Түбән Лекәнде, Tübän Lekände) is a rural locality (a village) in Nagadaksky Selsoviet, Aurgazinsky District, Bashkortostan, Russia. The population was 234 as of 2010. There are 4 streets.

== Geography ==
Nizhniye Lekandy is located 44 km northeast of Tolbazy (the district's administrative centre) by road. Malaya Ivanovka is the nearest rural locality.
