= Chesnokovka, Republic of Bashkortostan =

Chesnokovka Чесноковка
- Selo
- Location within Bashkortostan Location within Russia
- Coordinates: 54°36′N 55°56′E
- Country: Russia
- Region: Bashkortostan
- District: Ufimsky District
- Time zone: UTC+5:00

Chesnokovka (Russian: Чесноковка) is a rural locality (a selo) and the administrative centre of Chesnokovsky Selsoviet, Ufimsky District, Bashkortostan, Russia. The population was 3,333 as of 2010. There are 83 streets.

== Geography ==
Chesnokovka is located 15 km south of Ufa (the district's administrative centre) by road. Zubovo is the nearest rural locality.
