= Zubovo, Ufimsky District, Republic of Bashkortostan =

Zubovo Зубово
- Selo
- Location within Bashkortostan Location within Russia
- Coordinates: 54°37′N 55°54′E
- Country: Russia
- Region: Bashkortostan
- District: Ufimsky District
- Time zone: UTC+5:00

Zubovo (Russian: Зубово) is a rural locality (a selo) and the administrative center of Zubovsky Selsoviet, Ufimsky District, Bashkortostan, Russia. The population was 2,042 as of 2010. There are 70 streets.

== Geography ==
Zubovo is located 15 km south of Ufa (the district's administrative centre) by road. Chesnokovka is the nearest rural locality.
