= Blagoveshchenskoye, Vladimir Oblast =

Blagoveshchenskoye Благовещенское
- Selo
- Location within Vladimir Oblast Location within Russia
- Coordinates: 55°43′N 42°12′E
- Country: Russia
- Region: Vladimir Oblast
- District: Muromsky District
- Time zone: UTC+3:00

Blagoveshchenskoye (Russian: Благове́щенское) is a rural locality (a selo) in Borisoglebskoye Rural Settlement, Muromsky District, Vladimir Oblast, Russia. The population was 116 as of 2010. There are 3 streets.

== History ==
Blagoveshchenskoye was first mentioned in historical records in 1506.

== Geography ==
Blagoveshchenskoye is located on the left bank of the Oka River, 53 km north of Murom (the district's administrative centre) by road. Poltso is the nearest rural locality.
