= Taptykovo =

Taptykovo Таптыково
- Selo
- Location within Bashkortostan Location within Russia
- Coordinates: 54°36′N 55°47′E
- Country: Russia
- Region: Bashkortostan
- District: Ufimsky District
- Time zone: UTC+5:00

Taptykovo (Russian: Таптыково; Bashkir: Таптыҡ, Taptıq) is a rural locality (a selo) in Taptykovsky Selsoviet, Ufimsky District, Bashkortostan, Russia. The population was 734 as of 2010. There are 35 streets.

== Geography ==
Taptykovo is located 25 km southwest of Ufa (the district's administrative centre) by road. Glumilino is the nearest rural locality.
