= Naumovka =

Naumovka Наумовка
- Selo
- Location within Bashkortostan Location within Russia
- Coordinates: 53°31′N 55°55′E
- Country: Russia
- Region: Bashkortostan
- District: Sterlitamaksky District
- Time zone: UTC+5:00

Naumovka (Russian: Наумовка) is a rural locality (a selo) and the administrative centre of Naumovsky Selsoviet, Sterlitamaksky District, Bashkortostan, Russia. The population was 2,935 as of 2010. There are 27 streets.

== Geography ==
Naumovka is located 16 km south of Sterlitamak (the district's administrative centre) by road. Pokrovka is the nearest rural locality.
