= Selo sanatoriya Yumatovo imeni 15-letiya BASSR =

Selo sanatoriya Yumatovo imeni 15-letiya BASSR Село санатория Юматово имени 15-летия БАССР БАССР-ҙың 15 йыллығы исемендәге Йоматау шифаханаһы BASSR-źıñ 15 yıllığı isemendäge Yomataw şifaxanahı
- Selo
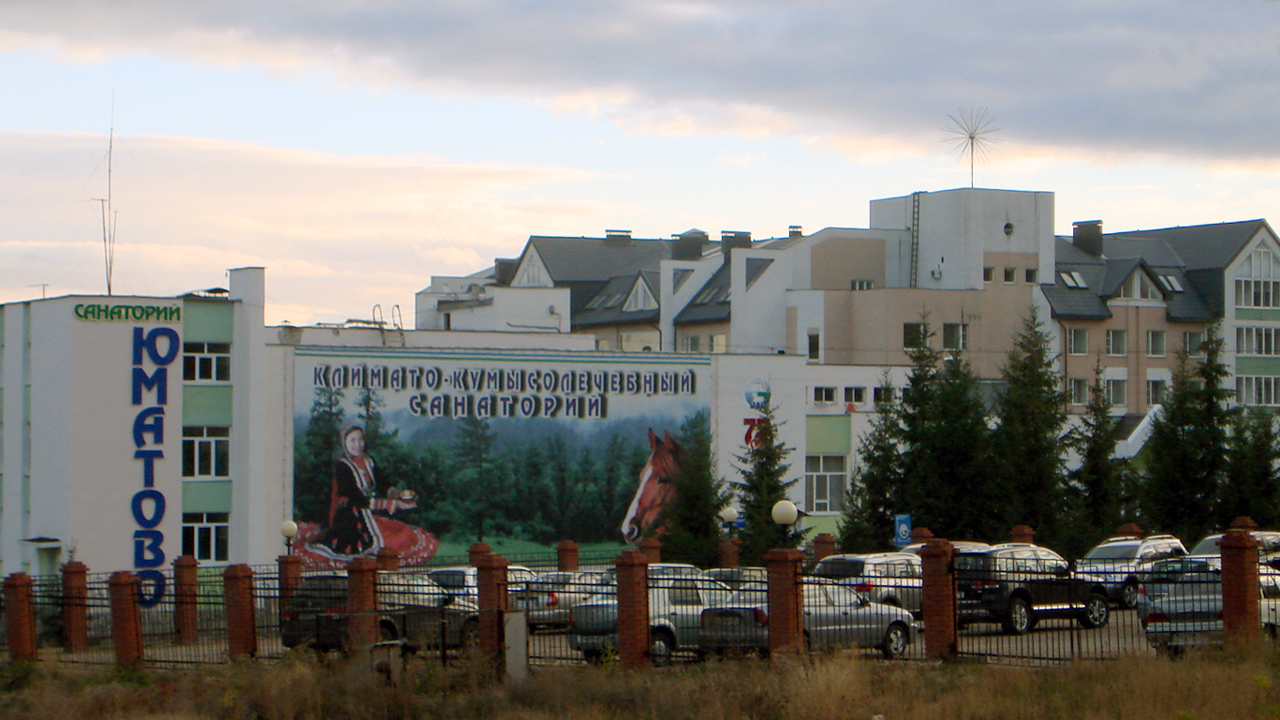
- Yumatovo recreation center in 2010

- Location within Bashkortostan Location within Russia
- Coordinates: 54°36′N 55°38′E
- Country: Russia
- Region: Bashkortostan
- District: Ufimsky District
- Time zone: UTC+5:00

Selo sanatoriya Yumatovo imeni 15-letiya BASSR (Russian: Село санатория Юматово имени 15-летия БАССР; Bashkir: БАССР-ҙың 15 йыллығы исемендәге Йоматау шифаханаһы, BASSR-źıñ 15 yıllığı isemendäge Yomataw şifaxanahı) is a rural locality (a selo) and the administrative centre of Yumatovsky Selsoviet, Ufimsky District, Bashkortostan, Russia. The population was 532 as of 2010. There is 1 street.

== Geography ==
Selo is located 38 km southwest of Ufa (the district's administrative centre) by road. Yumatovo is the nearest rural locality.
