= Avdon, Russia =

Avdon Авдон
- Village
- Location within Bashkortostan Location within Russia
- Coordinates: 54°40′N 55°43′E
- Country: Russia
- Region: Bashkortostan
- District: Ufimsky District
- Time zone: UTC+5:00

Avdon (Russian: Авдон; Bashkir: Авдон, Awdon) is a rural locality (a selo) and the administrative centre of Avdonsky Selsoviet, Ufimsky District, Bashkortostan, Russia. The population was 5,263 as of 2017. There are 20 streets.

== Geography ==
Avdon is located 30 km southwest of Ufa (the district's administrative centre) by road. Platonovka is the nearest rural locality.

== Ethnicity ==
The village is inhabited by Tatars, Russians.
