= Bulgakovo, Republic of Bashkortostan =

Coordinates: 54°30′0″N 55°54′0″E

Bulgakovo (Russian: Булга́ково) is a rural locality (a selo) in Ufimsky District of the Republic of Bashkortostan, Russia, located 42 kilometers (26 mi) north of Ufa, the capital of the republic. Population: 3,591 (2010 census).

It was founded in 1785 as a seltso.
