= Konstantin Tolkachyov =

Russian politician (1953–2026)

- Константин Толкачёв
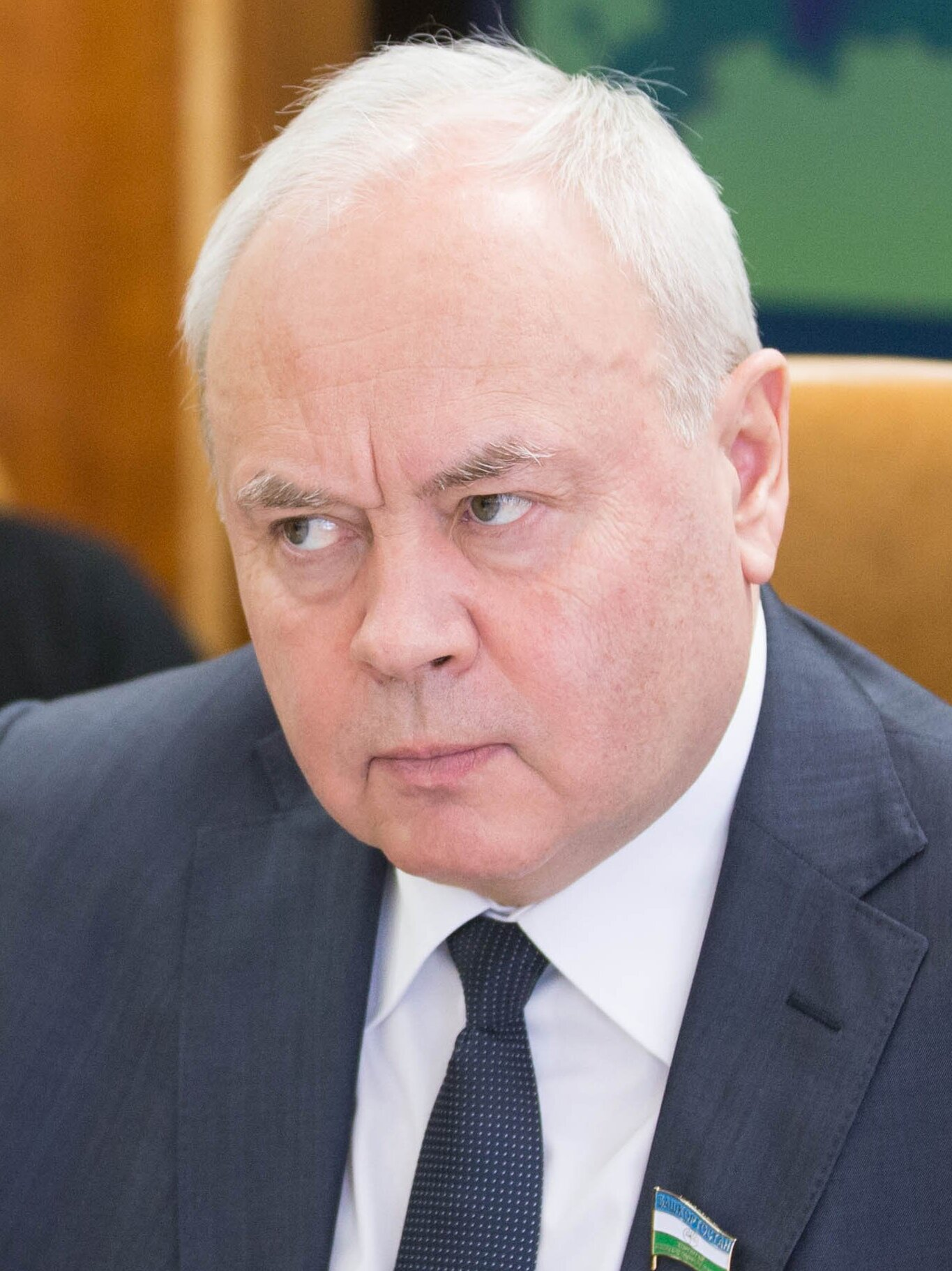
- Tolkachyov in 2019

Chairman of the State Assembly of the Republic of Bashkortostan
- In office 12 April 1999 – 4 May 2026

Personal details
- Born: 1 March 1953 Stalinsk, Kemerovo Oblast, Russian SFSR, Soviet Union
- Died: 4 May 2026 (aged 73) Moscow, Russia
- Party: United Russia
- Education: USSR Ministry of Internal Affairs Academy
- Occupation: Civil servant

Konstantin Borisovich Tolkachyov (Russian: Константин Борисович Толкачёв; 1 March 1953 – 4 May 2026) was a Russian politician. A member of United Russia, he served as chairman of the State Assembly of the Republic of Bashkortostan from 1999 to 2026.

Tolkachyov died from cancer in Moscow, on 4 May 2026, at the age of 73.
