= State Assembly of the Republic of Bashkortostan =

Regional parliament of Bashkortostan, Russia

State Assembly — Kurultai of the Republic of Bashkortostan Башҡортостан Республикаһының Дәүләт Йыйылышы — Ҡоролтай (Bashkir) Государственное собрание — Курултай Республики Башкортостан (Russian)
- 7th legislature

Type
- Type: Unicameral

Leadership
- Chairman: vacant since 4 May 2026

Structure
- Seats: 110
- Political groups: United Russia (87) CPRF (8); SRZP (5); LDPR (4); New People (1); Green (1) Independent (4)

Elections
- Last election: 9 September 2023
- Next election: 2028

Meeting place
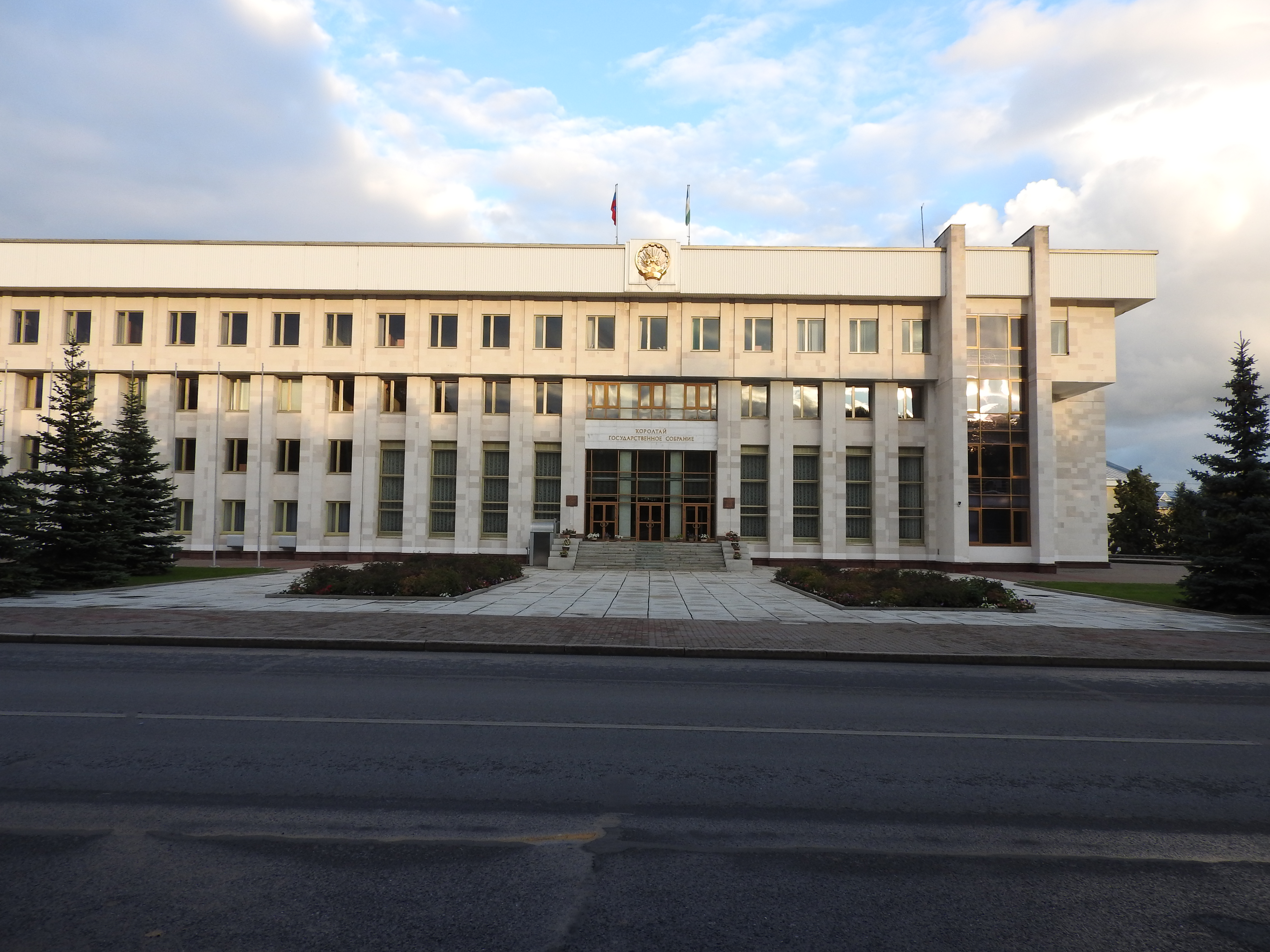
- 46 Zaki Validi Street, Ufa

Website
- http://www.gsrb.ru

The State Assembly — Kurultai of the Republic of Bashkortostan (Note: Bashkir: Башҡортостан Республикаһының Дәүләт Йыйылышы — Ҡоролтай, romanized: Başqortostan Respublikahınıñ Däwlät Yıyılışı — Qoroltay; Russian: Государственное Собрание — Курултай Республики Башкортостан) is the regional parliament of Bashkortostan, a federal subject of Russia. Its members are elected for five years.

Konstantin Tolkachyov was the chairman from March 1999 to May 2026.

== Overview ==
The jurisdiction of the State Assembly includes the adoption and amendment of the Bashkortostan Constitution, the definition of domestic and foreign policy Dealing with the change of borders, the definition of administrative and territorial structure, the approval of the state budget.

It succeeded the Supreme Soviet in 1995 and has two chambers: The House of Representatives and the Legislative House. The Chairman of the State Assembly presides over both chambers.

== Elections ==
=== 2018 ===
Party	%	Seats
United Russia	58.31	79
Communist Party of the Russian Federation	18.80	15
Liberal Democratic Party of Russia	9.96	7
A Just Russia	5.47	5
Patriots of Russia	3.95	2
The Greens	1.98	1
Self-nominated	—	1
Registered voters/turnout	49.08	

=== 2023 ===
Party	%	Seats
United Russia	69.50	87
Communist Party of the Russian Federation	11.81	8
Liberal Democratic Party of Russia	7.80	4
SR-ZP	7.45	5
New People	3.44	1
The Greens	2.01	1
Registered voters/turnout	51.63	
Independents	—	4

== See also ==
- List of Chairmen of the State Assembly of Bashkortostan
