= Novoye Baryatino =

Novoye Baryatino Новое Барятино
- Selo
- Location within Bashkortostan Location within Russia
- Coordinates: 53°42′N 55°54′E
- Country: Russia
- Region: Bashkortostan
- District: Sterlitamaksky District
- Time zone: UTC+5:00

Novoye Baryatino (Russian: Новое Барятино) is a rural locality (a selo) and the administrative centre of Kazadayevsky Selsoviet, Sterlitamaksky District, Bashkortostan, Russia. The population was 613 as of 2010. There are 25 streets.

== Geography ==
Novoye Baryatino is located 11 km north of Sterlitamak (the district's administrative centre) by road. Muravey is the nearest rural locality.
