= Novy Krasnoyar =

Novy Krasnoyar Новый Краснояр
- Selo
- Location within Bashkortostan Location within Russia
- Coordinates: 53°44′N 56°03′E
- Country: Russia
- Region: Bashkortostan
- District: Sterlitamaksky District
- Time zone: UTC+5:00

Novy Krasnoyar (Russian: Новый Краснояр) is a rural locality (a selo) and the administrative centre of Krasnoyarsky Selsoviet, Sterlitamaksky District, Bashkortostan, Russia. The population was 473 as of 2010. There are 14 streets.

== Geography ==
Novy Krasnoyar is located 19 km northeast of Sterlitamak (the district's administrative centre) by road. Taneyevka is the nearest rural locality.
