= Ishparsovo =

Ishparsovo Ишпарсово
- Selo
- Location within Bashkortostan Location within Russia
- Coordinates: 53°48′N 55°58′E
- Country: Russia
- Region: Bashkortostan
- District: Sterlitamaksky District
- Time zone: UTC+5:00

Ishparsovo (Russian: Ишпарсово; Bashkir: Ишбарс, İşbars) is a rural locality (a selo) in Podlesnensky Selsoviet, Sterlitamaksky District, Bashkortostan, Russia. The population was 767 as of 2010. There are 12 streets.

== Geography ==
Ishparsovo is located 24 km north of Sterlitamak (the district's administrative centre) by road. Talalayevka is the nearest rural locality.
