= Uslybash =

Uslybash Услыбаш
- Selo
- Location within Bashkortostan Location within Russia
- Coordinates: 53°45′N 55°33′E
- Country: Russia
- Region: Bashkortostan
- District: Sterlitamaksky District
- Time zone: UTC+5:00

Uslybash (Russian: Услыбаш; Bashkir: Уҫылыбаш, Uśılıbaş) is a rural locality (a selo) in Uslinsky Selsoviet, Sterlitamaksky District, Bashkortostan, Russia. The population was 348 as of 2010. There are 6 streets.

== Geography ==
Uslybash is located 33 km northwest of Sterlitamak (the district's administrative centre) by road. Churtan is the nearest rural locality.
