= Khripunovsky =

Khripunovsky Хрипуновский
- Khutor
- Location within Bashkortostan Location within Russia
- Coordinates: 53°49′N 56°09′E
- Country: Russia
- Region: Bashkortostan
- District: Sterlitamaksky District
- Time zone: UTC+5:00

Khripunovsky (Russian: Хрипуновский) is a rural locality (a village) in Kuganaksky Selsoviet, Sterlitamaksky District, Bashkortostan, Russia. The population was 10 as of 2010. There is 1 street.

== Geography ==
Khripunovsky is located 31 km northeast of Sterlitamak (the district's administrative centre) by road. Bolshoy Kuganak is the nearest rural locality.
