= Mikryukovka =

Mikryukovka Микрюковка
- Village
- Location within Bashkortostan Location within Russia
- Coordinates: 53°52′N 55°59′E
- Country: Russia
- Region: Bashkortostan
- District: Sterlitamaksky District
- Time zone: UTC+5:00

Mikryukovka (Russian: Микрюковка) is a rural locality (a village) in Podlesnensky Selsoviet, Sterlitamaksky District, Bashkortostan, Russia. The population was 4 as of 2010. There is 1 street.

== Geography ==
Mikryukovka is located 32 km north of Sterlitamak (the district's administrative centre) by road. Novoaleshkino is the nearest rural locality.
