= Zagorodny =

Zagorodny Загородный
- Selo
- Location within Bashkortostan Location within Russia
- Coordinates: 53°35′N 55°54′E
- Country: Russia
- Region: Bashkortostan
- District: Sterlitamaksky District
- Time zone: UTC+5:00

Zagorodny (Russian: Загородный) is a rural locality (a selo) in Otradovsky Selsoviet, Sterlitamaksky District, Bashkortostan, Russia. The population was 2,188 as of 2010. There are 30 streets.

== Geography ==
Zagorodny is located 7 km southwest of Sterlitamak (the district's administrative centre) by road. Novaya Otradovka is the nearest rural locality.
