= Chuvashsky Kuganak =

Chuvashsky Kuganak Чувашский Куганак
- Village
- Location within Bashkortostan Location within Russia
- Coordinates: 53°46′N 56°01′E
- Country: Russia
- Region: Bashkortostan
- District: Sterlitamaksky District
- Time zone: UTC+5:00

Chuvashsky Kuganak (Russian: Чувашский Куганак; Bashkir: Сыуаш-Ҡуғанаҡ, Sıwaş-Quğanaq) is a rural locality (a village) in Krasnoyarsky Selsoviet, Sterlitamaksky District, Bashkortostan, Russia. The population was 213 as of 2010. There are 4 streets.

== Geography ==
Chuvashsky Kuganak is located 23 km north of Sterlitamak (the district's administrative centre) by road. Cherkassy is the nearest rural locality.
