= Latypovka =

Latypovka Латыповка
- Village
- Location within Bashkortostan Location within Russia
- Coordinates: 53°38′N 55°20′E
- Country: Russia
- Region: Bashkortostan
- District: Sterlitamaksky District
- Time zone: UTC+5:00

Latypovka (Russian: Латыповка; Bashkir: Латип, Latip) is a rural locality (a village) in Maximovksky Selsoviet, Sterlitamaksky District, Bashkortostan, Russia. The population was 57 as of 2010. There is 1 street.

== Geography ==
Latypovka is located 59 km west of Sterlitamak (the district's administrative centre) by road. Alga is the nearest rural locality.
