= Sungur, Republic of Bashkortostan =

Sungur Сунгур
- Village
- Location within Bashkortostan Location within Russia
- Coordinates: 53°43′N 55°41′E
- Country: Russia
- Region: Bashkortostan
- District: Sterlitamaksky District
- Time zone: UTC+5:00

Sungur (Russian: Сунгур; Bashkir: Соңғор, Soñğor) is a rural locality (a village) in Uslinsky Selsoviet, Sterlitamaksky District, Bashkortostan, Russia. The population was 83 as of 2010. There is 1 street.

== Geography ==
Sungur is located 22 km northwest of Sterlitamak (the district's administrative centre) by road. Kucherbayevo is the nearest rural locality.
