= Vedenovka =

Vedenovka Веденовка
- Village
- Location within Bashkortostan Location within Russia
- Coordinates: 53°26′N 55°45′E
- Country: Russia
- Region: Bashkortostan
- District: Sterlitamaksky District
- Time zone: UTC+5:00

Vedenovka (Russian: Веденовка) is a rural locality (a village) in Ashkadarsky Selsoviet, Sterlitamaksky District, Bashkortostan, Russia. The population was 73 as of 2010. There is 1 street.

== Geography ==
Vedenovka is located 29 km southwest of Sterlitamak (the district's administrative centre) by road. Novofyodorovskoye is the nearest rural locality.
