= Konstantinogradovka, Republic of Bashkortostan =

Konstantinogradovka Константиноградовка
- Village
- Location within Bashkortostan Location within Russia
- Coordinates: 53°45′N 55°22′E
- Country: Russia
- Region: Bashkortostan
- District: Sterlitamaksky District
- Time zone: UTC+5:00

Konstantinogradovka (Russian: Константиноградовка) is a rural locality (a village) and the administrative centre of Konstantinogradovsky Selsoviet, Sterlitamaksky District, Bashkortostan, Russia. The population was 515 as of 2010. There are 4 streets.

== Geography ==
Konstantinogradovka is located 47 km northwest of Sterlitamak (the district's administrative centre) by road. Bogolyubovka is the nearest rural locality.
