= Ust-Zigan =

Ust-Zigan Усть-Зиган
- Village
- Location within Bashkortostan Location within Russia
- Coordinates: 53°51′N 56°09′E
- Country: Russia
- Region: Bashkortostan
- District: Sterlitamaksky District
- Time zone: UTC+5:00

Ust-Zigan (Russian: Усть-Зиган; Bashkir: Егәнтамаҡ, Yegäntamaq) is a rural locality (a village) in Kuganaksky Selsoviet, Sterlitamaksky District, Bashkortostan, Russia. The population was 19 as of 2010. There is 1 street.

== Geography ==
Ust-Zigan is located 34 km northeast of Sterlitamak (the district's administrative centre) by road. Pokrovka is the nearest rural locality.
