= Pervomayskoye, Sterlitamaksky District, Republic of Bashkortostan =

Pervomayskoye Первомайское
- Selo
- Location within Bashkortostan Location within Russia
- Coordinates: 53°51′N 55°25′E
- Country: Russia
- Region: Bashkortostan
- District: Sterlitamaksky District
- Time zone: UTC+5:00

Pervomayskoye (Russian: Первомайское) is a rural locality (a selo) and the administrative centre of Pervomaysky Selsoviet, Sterlitamaksky District, Bashkortostan, Russia. The population was 918 as of 2010. There are 10 streets.

== Geography ==
Pervomayskoye is located 48 km northwest of Sterlitamak (the district's administrative centre) by road. Abdrakhmanovo is the nearest rural locality.
