= Fedoro-Petrovka =

Fedoro-Petrovka Федоро-Петровка
- Village
- Location within Bashkortostan Location within Russia
- Coordinates: 53°49′N 55°26′E
- Country: Russia
- Region: Bashkortostan
- District: Sterlitamaksky District
- Time zone: UTC+5:00

Fedoro-Petrovka (Russian: Федоро-Петровка) is a rural locality (a village) in Pervomaysky Selsoviet, Sterlitamaksky District, Bashkortostan, Russia. The population was 2 as of 2010. There is 1 street.

== Geography ==
Fedoro-Petrovka is located 43 km northwest of Sterlitamak (the district's administrative centre) by road. Pervomayskoye is the nearest rural locality.
