= Beryozovka, Sterlitamaksky District, Republic of Bashkortostan =

Beryozovka Берёзовка
- Village
- Location within Bashkortostan Location within Russia
- Coordinates: 53°52′N 56°03′E
- Country: Russia
- Region: Bashkortostan
- District: Sterlitamaksky District
- Time zone: UTC+5:00

Beryozovka (Russian: Берёзовка) is a rural locality (a village) in Kuganaksky Selsoviet, Sterlitamaksky District, Bashkortostan, Russia. The population was 3 as of 2010. There are 2 streets.

== Geography ==
Beryozovka is located 40 km north of Sterlitamak (the district's administrative centre) by road. Mikryukovka is the nearest rural locality.
