= Burikazganovo =

Burikazganovo Буриказганово
- Selo
- Location within Bashkortostan Location within Russia
- Coordinates: 53°43′N 55°46′E
- Country: Russia
- Region: Bashkortostan
- District: Sterlitamaksky District
- Time zone: UTC+5:00

Burikazganovo (Russian: Буриказганово; Bashkir: Бүреҡаҙған, Büreqaźğan) is a rural locality (a selo) and the administrative centre of Burikazganovsky Selsoviet, Sterlitamaksky District, Bashkortostan, Russia. The population was 799 as of 2010. There are 6 streets.

== Geography ==
Burikazganovo is located 15 km northwest of Sterlitamak (the district's administrative centre) by road. Novomukatovka is the nearest rural locality.
