= Ozerkovka =

Ozerkovka Озерковка
- Village
- Location within Bashkortostan Location within Russia
- Coordinates: 53°26′N 55°49′E
- Country: Russia
- Region: Bashkortostan
- District: Sterlitamaksky District
- Time zone: UTC+5:00

Ozerkovka (Russian: Озерковка) is a rural locality (a village) in Naumovsky Selsoviet, Sterlitamaksky District, Bashkortostan, Russia. The population was 28 as of 2010. There is 1 street.

== Geography ==
Ozerkovka is located 28 km south of Sterlitamak (the district's administrative centre) by road. Ayuchevo is the nearest rural locality.
