= Novoabdrakhmanovo =

Novoabdrakhmanovo Новоабдрахманово
- Village
- Location within Bashkortostan Location within Russia
- Coordinates: 53°52′N 55°28′E
- Country: Russia
- Region: Bashkortostan
- District: Sterlitamaksky District
- Time zone: UTC+5:00

Novoabdrakhmanovo (Russian: Новоабдрахманово; Bashkir: Яңы Абдрахман, Yañı Abdraxman) is a rural locality (a village) in Pervomaysky Selsoviet, Sterlitamaksky District, Bashkortostan, Russia. The population was 38 as of 2010. There is 1 street.

== Geography ==
Novoabdrakhmanovo is located 52 km northwest of Sterlitamak (the district's administrative centre) by road. Abdrakhmanovo is the nearest rural locality.
