= Talachevo =

Talachevo Талачево
- Selo
- Location within Bashkortostan Location within Russia
- Coordinates: 53°45′N 55°48′E
- Country: Russia
- Region: Bashkortostan
- District: Sterlitamaksky District
- Time zone: UTC+5:00

Talachevo (Russian: Талачево; Bashkir: Талас, Talas) is a rural locality (a selo) in Burikazganovsky Selsoviet, Sterlitamaksky District, Bashkortostan, Russia. The population was 895 as of 2010. There are 9 streets.

== Geography ==
Talachevo is located 22 km northwest of Sterlitamak (the district's administrative centre) by road. Sadovka is the nearest rural locality.
