= Podlesnoye, Sterlitamaksky District, Republic of Bashkortostan =

Podlesnoye Подлесное
- Village
- Location within Bashkortostan Location within Russia
- Coordinates: 53°48′N 55°56′E
- Country: Russia
- Region: Bashkortostan
- District: Sterlitamaksky District
- Time zone: UTC+5:00

Podlesnoye (Russian: Подлесное) is a rural locality (a village) and the administrative centre of Podlesnensky Selsoviet, Sterlitamaksky District, Bashkortostan, Russia. The population was 376 as of 2010. There are 3 streets.

== Geography ==
Podlesnoye is located 29 km north of Sterlitamak (the district's administrative centre) by road. Ishparsovo is the nearest rural locality.
