= Ashkadar =

Ashkadar Ашкадар
- Village
- Location within Bashkortostan Location within Russia
- Coordinates: 53°33′N 55°49′E
- Country: Russia
- Region: Bashkortostan
- District: Sterlitamaksky District
- Time zone: UTC+5:00

Ashkadar (Russian: Ашкадар; Bashkir: Ашҡаҙар, Aşqaźar) is a rural locality (a village) in Otradovsky Selsoviet, Sterlitamaksky District, Bashkortostan, Russia. The population was 71 as of 2010. There are 4 streets.

== Geography ==
Ashkadar is located 13 km southwest of Sterlitamak (the district's administrative centre) by road. Vesyoly is the nearest rural locality.
