= Yuzhny, Sterlitamaksky District, Republic of Bashkortostan =

Yuzhny Южный
- Village
- Location within Bashkortostan Location within Russia
- Coordinates: 53°30′N 55°39′E
- Country: Russia
- Region: Bashkortostan
- District: Sterlitamaksky District
- Time zone: UTC+5:00

Yuzhny (Russian: Южный) is a rural locality (a village) in Oktyabrsky Selsoviet, Sterlitamaksky District, Bashkortostan, Russia. The population was 263 as of 2010. There are 3 streets.

== Geography ==
Yuzhny is located 30 km southwest of Sterlitamak (the district's administrative centre) by road. Pokrovka-Ozerki is the nearest rural locality.
