= Kateninovsky =

Kateninovsky Катениновский
- Village
- Location within Bashkortostan Location within Russia
- Coordinates: 53°46′N 56°06′E
- Country: Russia
- Region: Bashkortostan
- District: Sterlitamaksky District
- Time zone: UTC+5:00

Kateninovsky (Russian: Катениновский) is a rural locality (a village) in Krasnoyarsky Selsoviet, Sterlitamaksky District, Bashkortostan, Russia. The population was 9 as of 2010. There are 6 streets.

== Geography ==
Kateninovsky is located 25 km northeast of Sterlitamak (the district's administrative centre) by road. Krasny Oktyabr is the nearest rural locality.
