= Tyuryushlya =

Tyuryushlya Тюрюшля
- Selo
- Location within Bashkortostan Location within Russia
- Coordinates: 53°27′N 55°37′E
- Country: Russia
- Region: Bashkortostan
- District: Sterlitamaksky District
- Time zone: UTC+5:00

Tyuryushlya (Russian: Тюрюшля; Bashkir: Түрешле, Türeşle) is a rural locality (a selo) and the administrative centre of Tyuryushlinsky Selsoviet, Sterlitamaksky District, Bashkortostan, Russia. The population was 917 as of 2010. There are 6 streets.

== Geography ==
Tyuryushlya is located 38 km southwest of Sterlitamak (the district's administrative centre) by road. Yuzhny is the nearest rural locality.
