= Ryazanovka =

Ryazanovka Рязановка
- Village
- Location within Bashkortostan Location within Russia
- Coordinates: 53°39′N 55°45′E
- Country: Russia
- Region: Bashkortostan
- District: Sterlitamaksky District
- Time zone: UTC+5:00

Ryazanovka (Russian: Рязановка) is a rural locality (a village) and the administrative centre of Ryazanovsky Selsoviet, Sterlitamaksky District, Bashkortostan, Russia. The population was 616 as of 2010. There are 2 streets.

== Geography ==
Ryazanovka is located 12 km northwest of Sterlitamak (the district's administrative centre) by road. Marshanovka is the nearest rural locality.
