= Buguruslanovka =

Buguruslanovka Бугуруслановка
- Village
- Location within Bashkortostan Location within Russia
- Coordinates: 53°39′N 55°32′E
- Country: Russia
- Region: Bashkortostan
- District: Sterlitamaksky District
- Time zone: UTC+5:00

Buguruslanovka (Russian: Бугуруслановка; Bashkir: Боғорослан, Boğoroslan) is a rural locality (a village) in Maximovksky Selsoviet, Sterlitamaksky District, Bashkortostan, Russia. The population was 233 as of 2010. There are 3 streets.

== Geography ==
Buguruslanovka is located 42 km west of Sterlitamak (the district's administrative centre) by road. Petrovka is the nearest rural locality.
