= Churtan, Republic of Bashkortostan =

Churtan Чуртан
- Village
- Location within Bashkortostan Location within Russia
- Coordinates: 53°43′48″N 55°31′02″E
- Country: Russia
- Region: Bashkortostan
- District: Sterlitamaksky District
- Time zone: UTC+5:00

Churtan (Russian: Чуртан; Bashkir: Суртан, Surtan) is a rural locality (a village) in Uslinsky Selsoviet, Sterlitamaksky District, Bashkortostan, Russia. The population was 474 as of 2010. There are 6 streets.

== Geography ==
Churtan is located 34 km northwest of Sterlitamak (the district's administrative centre) by road. Uslybash is the nearest rural locality.
