= Bolshoy Kuganak =

Bolshoy Kuganak Большой Куганак
- Selo
- Location within Bashkortostan Location within Russia
- Coordinates: 53°48′N 56°06′E
- Country: Russia
- Region: Bashkortostan
- District: Sterlitamaksky District
- Time zone: UTC+5:00

Bolshoy Kuganak (Russian: Большой Куганак; Bashkir: Оло Ҡуғанаҡ, Olo Quğanaq) is a rural locality (a selo) and the administrative centre of Kuganaksky Selsoviet, Sterlitamaksky District, Bashkortostan, Russia. The population was 2,368 as of 2010. There are 24 streets.

== Geography ==
Bolshoy Kuganak is located 27 km northeast of Sterlitamak (the district's administrative centre) by road. Khripunovsky is the nearest rural locality.
