= Preobrazhenovka, Republic of Bashkortostan =

Preobrazhenovka Преображеновка
- Village
- Location within Bashkortostan Location within Russia
- Coordinates: 53°33′N 55°43′E
- Country: Russia
- Region: Bashkortostan
- District: Sterlitamaksky District
- Time zone: UTC+5:00

Preobrazhenovka (Russian: Преображеновка) is a rural locality (a village) in Nikolayevsky Selsoviet, Sterlitamaksky District, Bashkortostan, Russia. The population was 383 as of 2010. There are 3 streets.

== Geography ==
Preobrazhenovka is located 22 km southwest of Sterlitamak (the district's administrative centre) by road. Vesyoly is the nearest rural locality.
