= Vedernikovsky =

Vedernikovsky Ведерниковский
- Village
- Location within Bashkortostan Location within Russia
- Coordinates: 53°47′N 56°02′E
- Country: Russia
- Region: Bashkortostan
- District: Sterlitamaksky District
- Time zone: UTC+5:00

Vedernikovsky (Russian: Ведерниковский) is a rural locality (a village) in Podlesnensky Selsoviet, Sterlitamaksky District, Bashkortostan, Russia. The population was 3 as of 2010. There is 1 street.

== Geography ==
Vedernikovsky is located 28 km north of Sterlitamak (the district's administrative centre) by road. Chuvashsky Kuganak is the nearest rural locality.
