= Yeslevsky =

Yeslevsky Еслевский
- Village
- Location within Bashkortostan Location within Russia
- Coordinates: 53°41′N 55°43′E
- Country: Russia
- Region: Bashkortostan
- District: Sterlitamaksky District
- Time zone: UTC+5:00

Yeslevsky (Russian: Еслевский) is a rural locality (a village) in Ryazanovsky Selsoviet, Sterlitamaksky District, Bashkortostan, Russia. The population was 70 as of 2010. There are 2 streets.

== Geography ==
Yeslevsky is located 17 km northwest of Sterlitamak (the district's administrative centre) by road. Marshanovka is the nearest rural locality.
