= Sadovka =

Sadovka Садовка
- Selo
- Location within Bashkortostan Location within Russia
- Coordinates: 53°46′N 55°44′E
- Country: Russia
- Region: Bashkortostan
- District: Sterlitamaksky District
- Time zone: UTC+5:00

Sadovka (Russian: Садовка) is a rural locality (a selo) in Burikazganovsky Selsoviet, Sterlitamaksky District, Bashkortostan, Russia. The population was 424 as of 2010. There are 2 streets.

== Geography ==
Sadovka is located 23 km northwest of Sterlitamak (the district's administrative centre) by road. Talachevo is the nearest rural locality.
