= Kazadayevka =

Kazadayevka Казадаевка
- Village
- Location within Bashkortostan Location within Russia
- Coordinates: 53°39′N 55°49′E
- Country: Russia
- Region: Bashkortostan
- District: Sterlitamaksky District
- Time zone: UTC+5:00

Kazadayevka (Russian: Казадаевка) is a rural locality (a village) in Kazadayevsky Selsoviet, Sterlitamaksky District, Bashkortostan, Russia. The population was 51 as of 2010. There are four streets.

== Geography ==
Kazadayevka is located 8 km (5.0 mi) northwest of Sterlitamak (the district's administrative centre) by road. Mariinsky is the nearest rural locality.
