= Begenyash =

Begenyash Бегеняш
- Village
- Location within Bashkortostan Location within Russia
- Coordinates: 53°47′N 55°29′E
- Country: Russia
- Region: Bashkortostan
- District: Sterlitamaksky District
- Time zone: UTC+5:00

Begenyash (Russian: Бегеняш; Bashkir: Бәгәнәш, Bägänäş) is a rural locality (a village) in Pervomaysky Selsoviet, Sterlitamaksky District, Bashkortostan, Russia. The population was 290 in 2010. There are three streets.

== Geography ==
Begenyash is located 38 kilometres (24 mi) northwest of Sterlitamak (the district's administrative centre) by road. Vladimirovka is the nearest rural locality.
