= Petrovka, Sterlitamaksky District, Republic of Bashkortostan =

Petrovka Петровка
- Village
- Location within Bashkortostan Location within Russia
- Coordinates: 53°37′N 55°29′E
- Country: Russia
- Region: Bashkortostan
- District: Sterlitamaksky District
- Time zone: UTC+5:00

Petrovka (Russian: Петровка) is a rural locality (a village) in Maximovksky Selsoviet, Sterlitamaksky District, Bashkortostan, Russia. The population was 61 as of 2010. There is one street.

== Geography ==
Petrovka is located 46 km west of Sterlitamak (the district's administrative centre) by road. Maximovka is the nearest rural locality.
