= Bayrak, Sterlitamaksky District, Republic of Bashkortostan =

Bayrak Байрак
- Village
- Location within Bashkortostan Location within Russia
- Coordinates: 53°34′N 55°53′E
- Country: Russia
- Region: Bashkortostan
- District: Sterlitamaksky District
- Time zone: UTC+5:00

Bayrak (Russian: Байрак; Bashkir: Байраҡ, Bayraq) is a rural locality (a village) in Otradovsky Selsoviet, Sterlitamaksky District, Bashkortostan, Russia. The population was 188 as of 2010. There are 13 streets.

== Geography ==
Bayrak is located 10 km southwest of Sterlitamak (the district's administrative centre) by road. Zagorodny is the nearest rural locality.
