= Marshanovka =

Marshanovka Маршановка
- Village
- Location within Bashkortostan Location within Russia
- Coordinates: 53°40′N 55°43′E
- Country: Russia
- Region: Bashkortostan
- District: Sterlitamaksky District
- Time zone: UTC+5:00

Marshanovka (Russian: Маршановка) is a rural locality (a village) in Ryazanovsky Selsoviet, Sterlitamaksky District, Bashkortostan, Russia. The population was 83 as of 2010. There are 2 streets.

== Geography ==
Marshanovka is located 16 km west of Sterlitamak (the district's administrative centre) by road. Ryazanovka is the nearest rural locality.
