= Dergachevka =

Dergachevka Дергачевка
- Village
- Location within Bashkortostan Location within Russia
- Coordinates: 53°50′N 55°31′E
- Country: Russia
- Region: Bashkortostan
- District: Sterlitamaksky District
- Time zone: UTC+5:00

Dergachevka (Russian: Дергачевка) is a rural locality (a village) in Pervomaysky Selsoviet, Sterlitamaksky District, Bashkortostan, Russia. The population was 298 as of 2010. There are 4 streets.

== Geography ==
Dergachevka is located 44 km northwest of Sterlitamak (the district's administrative centre) by road. Sokolovka is the nearest rural locality.
