= Rybkinsky =

Rybkinsky Рыбкинский
- Khutor
- Location within Bashkortostan Location within Russia
- Coordinates: 53°38′N 55°41′E
- Country: Russia
- Region: Bashkortostan
- District: Sterlitamaksky District
- Time zone: UTC+5:00

Rybkinsky (Russian: Рыбкинский) is a rural locality (a khutor) in Ryazanovsky Selsoviet, Sterlitamaksky District, Bashkortostan, Russia. The population was 12 as of 2010. There is 1 street.

== Geography ==
Rybkinsky is located 20 km west of Sterlitamak (the district's administrative centre) by road. Severnaya is the nearest rural locality.
