= Yuraktau, Sterlitamaksky District, Republic of Bashkortostan =

Yuraktau Юрактау
- Village
- Location within Bashkortostan Location within Russia
- Coordinates: 53°44′N 56°07′E
- Country: Russia
- Region: Bashkortostan
- District: Sterlitamaksky District
- Time zone: UTC+5:00

Yuraktau (Russian: Юрактау; Bashkir: Йөрәктау, Yöräktaw) is a rural locality (a village) in Alataninsky Selsoviet, Sterlitamaksky District, Bashkortostan, Russia. The population was 221 as of 2010. There are 5 streets.

== Geography ==
Yuraktau is located 28 km northeast of Sterlitamak (the district's administrative centre) by road. Nikolayevka is the nearest rural locality.
