= Asavo-Zubovo =

Asavo-Zubovo Асаво-Зубово
- Selo
- Location within Bashkortostan Location within Russia
- Coordinates: 53°44′N 55°55′E
- Country: Russia
- Region: Bashkortostan
- District: Sterlitamaksky District
- Time zone: UTC+5:00

Asavo-Zubovo (Russian: Асаво-Зубово; Bashkir: Аҫау-Зубов, Aśaw-Zubov) is a rural locality (a selo) in Kazadayevsky Selsoviet, Sterlitamaksky District, Bashkortostan, Russia. The population was 137 as of 2010. There is 1 street.

== Geography ==
Asavo-Zubovo is located 14 km north of Sterlitamak (the district's administrative centre) by road. Roshchinsky is the nearest rural locality.
