= Novofyodorovsky =

Novofyodorovsky (masculine), Novofyodorovskaya (feminine), or Novofyodorovskoye (neuter) may refer to:

- Novofyodorovskoye Settlement, a municipal division in Troitsky Administrative Okrug of the federal city of Moscow, Russia
- Novofyodorovsky (rural locality), a khutor in Neklinovsky District of Rostov Oblast, Russia
- Novofyodorovskoye (rural locality), a village in Sterlitamaksky District of the Republic of Bashkortostan, Russia
