= Pokrovka-Ozerki =

Pokrovka-Ozerki Покровка-Озерки
- Village
- Location within Bashkortostan Location within Russia
- Coordinates: 53°29′N 55°40′E
- Country: Russia
- Region: Bashkortostan
- District: Sterlitamaksky District
- Time zone: UTC+5:00

Pokrovka-Ozerki (Russian: Покровка-Озерки) is a rural locality (a village) in Tyuryushlinsky Selsoviet, Sterlitamaksky District, Bashkortostan, Russia. The population was 22 as of 2010. There are 2 streets.

== Geography ==
Pokrovka-Ozerki is located 32 km southwest of Sterlitamak (the district's administrative centre) by road. Yuzhny is the nearest rural locality.
