= Verkhniye Usly =

Verkhniye Usly Верхние Услы
- Selo
- Location within Bashkortostan Location within Russia
- Coordinates: 53°43′N 55°35′E
- Country: Russia
- Region: Bashkortostan
- District: Sterlitamaksky District
- Time zone: UTC+5:00

Verkhniye Usly (Russian: Верхние Услы; Bashkir: Үрге Уҫылы, Ürge Uśılı) is a rural locality (a selo) and the administrative centre of Uslinsky Selsoviet, Sterlitamaksky District, Bashkortostan, Russia. The population was 732 as of 2010. There are 8 streets.

== Geography ==
Verkhniye Usly is located 26 km northwest of Sterlitamak (the district's administrative centre) by road. Nizhniye Usly is the nearest rural locality.
