= Novaya Otradovka =

Novaya Otradovka Новая Отрадовка
- Selo
- Location within Bashkortostan Location within Russia
- Coordinates: 53°35′N 55°53′E
- Country: Russia
- Region: Bashkortostan
- District: Sterlitamaksky District
- Time zone: UTC+5:00

Novaya Otradovka (Russian: Новая Отрадовка) is a rural locality (a selo) and the administrative centre of Otradovsky Selsoviet, Sterlitamaksky District, Bashkortostan, Russia. The population was 1,242 as of 2010. There are 25 streets.

== Geography ==
Novaya Otradovka is located 7 km southwest of Sterlitamak (the district's administrative centre) by road. Zagorodny is the nearest rural locality.
