= Novomukatovka =

Novomukatovka Новомукатовка
- Village
- Location within Bashkortostan Location within Russia
- Coordinates: 53°42′N 55°44′E
- Country: Russia
- Region: Bashkortostan
- District: Sterlitamaksky District
- Time zone: UTC+5:00

Novomukatovka (Russian: Новомукатовка; Bashkir: Яңы Моҡатай, Yañı Moqatay) is a rural locality (a village) in Ryazanovsky Selsoviet, Sterlitamaksky District, Bashkortostan, Russia. The population was 6 as of 2010. There is 1 street.

== Geography ==
Novomukatovka is located 21 km northwest of Sterlitamak (the district's administrative centre) by road. Burikazganovo is the nearest rural locality.
