= Lyubovka, Republic of Bashkortostan =

Lyubovka Любовка
- Village
- Location within Bashkortostan Location within Russia
- Coordinates: 53°45′N 55°28′E
- Country: Russia
- Region: Bashkortostan
- District: Sterlitamaksky District
- Time zone: UTC+5:00

Lyubovka (Russian: Любовка) is a rural locality (a village) in Uslinsky Selsoviet, Sterlitamaksky District, Bashkortostan, Russia. The population was 88 as of 2010. There is 1 street.

== Geography ==
Lyubovka is located 36 km northwest of Sterlitamak (the district's administrative centre) by road. Churtan is the nearest rural locality.
