= Nizhniye Usly =

Nizhniye Usly Нижние Услы
- Selo
- Location within Bashkortostan Location within Russia
- Coordinates: 53°42′N 55°36′E
- Country: Russia
- Region: Bashkortostan
- District: Sterlitamaksky District
- Time zone: UTC+5:00

Nizhniye Usly (Russian: Нижние Услы; Bashkir: Түбәнге Уҫылы, Tübänge Uśılı) is a rural locality (a selo) in Uslinsky Selsoviet, Sterlitamaksky District, Bashkortostan, Russia. The population was 444 as of 2010. There are 2 streets.

== Geography ==
Nizhniye Usly is located 27 km northwest of Sterlitamak (the district's administrative centre) by road. Verkhniye Usly is the nearest rural locality.
