= Aygulevo =

Aygulevo Айгулево
- Selo
- Location within Bashkortostan Location within Russia
- Coordinates: 53°29′N 55°48′E
- Country: Russia
- Region: Bashkortostan
- District: Sterlitamaksky District
- Time zone: UTC+5:00

Aygulevo (Russian: Айгулево; Bashkir: Айгөл, Aygöl) is a rural locality (a selo) and the administrative centre of Aygulevsky Selsoviet, Sterlitamaksky District, Bashkortostan, Russia. The population was 641 as of 2010. There are 5 streets.

== Geography ==
Aygulevo is located 23 kilometres (14 mi) southwest of Sterlitamak (the district's administrative centre) by road. Pomryaskino is the nearest rural locality.
