= Alatana =

Alatana Алатана
- Selo
- Location within Bashkortostan Location within Russia
- Coordinates: 53°42′N 56°08′E
- Country: Russia
- Region: Bashkortostan
- District: Sterlitamaksky District
- Time zone: UTC+5:00

Alatana (Bashkir and Russian: Алатана) is a rural locality (a selo) and the administrative centre of Alataninsky Selsoviet, Sterlitamaksky District, Bashkortostan, Russia. The population was 137 as of 2010. There are 5 streets.

== Geography ==
Alatana is located 26 km northeast of Sterlitamak (the district's administrative centre) by road. Zabelskoye is the nearest rural locality.
