= Alga, Sterlitamaksky District, Republic of Bashkortostan =

Alga Алга
- Village
- Location within Bashkortostan Location within Russia
- Coordinates: 53°38′N 55°23′E
- Country: Russia
- Region: Bashkortostan
- District: Sterlitamaksky District
- Time zone: UTC+5:00

Alga (Russian: Алга; Bashkir: Алға, Alğa) is a rural locality (a village) in Maximovksky Selsoviet, Sterlitamaksky District, Bashkortostan, Russia. The population was 206 as of 2010. There are 2 streets.

== Geography ==
Alga is located 56 km west of Sterlitamak (the district's administrative centre) by road. Latypovka is the nearest rural locality.
