= Shikhany, Republic of Bashkortostan =

Shikhany Шиханы
- Village
- Location within Bashkortostan Location within Russia
- Coordinates: 53°41′N 56°05′E
- Country: Russia
- Region: Bashkortostan
- District: Sterlitamaksky District
- Time zone: UTC+5:00

Shikhany (Russian: Шиханы; Bashkir: Шихан, Şixan) is a rural locality (a village) in Alataninsky Selsoviet, Sterlitamaksky District, Bashkortostan, Russia. The population was 321 as of 2010. There are 5 streets.

== Geography ==
Shikhany is located 19 km northeast of Sterlitamak (the district's administrative centre) by road. Urnyak is the nearest rural locality.
