= Kucherbayevo =

Kucherbayevo Кучербаево
- Village
- Location within Bashkortostan Location within Russia
- Coordinates: 53°40′N 55°41′E
- Country: Russia
- Region: Bashkortostan
- District: Sterlitamaksky District
- Time zone: UTC+5:00

Kucherbayevo (Russian: Кучербаево; Bashkir: Күсәрбай, Küsärbay) is a rural locality (a village) in Ryazanovsky Selsoviet, Sterlitamaksky District, Bashkortostan, Russia. The population was 332 as of 2010. There are 3 streets.

== Geography ==
Kucherbayevo is located 20 km northwest of Sterlitamak (the district's administrative centre) by road. Yeslevsky is the nearest rural locality.
