= Zolotonoshka =

Zolotonoshka Золотоношка
- Village
- Location within Bashkortostan Location within Russia
- Coordinates: 53°25′N 55°32′E
- Country: Russia
- Region: Bashkortostan
- District: Sterlitamaksky District
- Time zone: UTC+5:00

Zolotonoshka (Russian: Золотоношка) is a rural locality (a village) in Tyuryushlinsky Selsoviet, Sterlitamaksky District, Bashkortostan, Russia. The population was 563 as of 2010. There are 3 streets.

== Geography ==
Zolotonoshka is located 46 km southwest of Sterlitamak (the district's administrative centre) by road. Tyuryushlya is the nearest rural locality.
