= Grigoryevka, Sterlitamaksky District, Republic of Bashkortostan =

Grigoryevka Григорьевка
- Village
- Location within Bashkortostan Location within Russia
- Coordinates: 53°23′N 55°42′E
- Country: Russia
- Region: Bashkortostan
- District: Sterlitamaksky District
- Time zone: UTC+5:00

Grigoryevka (Russian: Григорьевка) is a rural locality (a village) in Ashkadarsky Selsoviet, Sterlitamaksky District, Bashkortostan, Russia. The population was 86 as of 2010. There is 1 street.

== Geography ==
Grigoryevka is located 37 km southwest of Sterlitamak (the district's administrative centre) by road. Maxyutovo is the nearest rural locality.
