= Ranny Rassvet =

Ranny Rassvet Ранний Рассвет
- Village
- Location within Bashkortostan Location within Russia
- Coordinates: 53°35′N 55°46′E
- Country: Russia
- Region: Bashkortostan
- District: Sterlitamaksky District
- Time zone: UTC+5:00

Ranny Rassvet (Russian: Ранний Рассвет) is a rural locality (a village) in Oktyabrsky Selsoviet, Sterlitamaksky District, Bashkortostan, Russia. The population was 115 as of 2010. There are 3 streets.

== Geography ==
Ranny Rassvet is located 17 km west of Sterlitamak (the district's administrative centre) by road. Vesyoly is the nearest rural locality.
