= Pomryaskino =

Pomryaskino Помряскино
- Selo
- Location within Bashkortostan Location within Russia
- Coordinates: 53°30′N 55°50′E
- Country: Russia
- Region: Bashkortostan
- District: Sterlitamaksky District
- Time zone: UTC+5:00

Pomryaskino (Russian: Помряскино) is a rural locality (a selo) in Aygulevsky Selsoviet, Sterlitamaksky District, Bashkortostan, Russia. The population was 295 as of 2010. There are 2 streets.

== Geography ==
Pomryaskino is located 19 km southwest of Sterlitamak (the district's administrative centre) by road. Aygulevo is the nearest rural locality.
