= Kononovsky =

Kononovsky Кононовский
- Village
- Location within Bashkortostan Location within Russia
- Coordinates: 53°33′N 55°39′E
- Country: Russia
- Region: Bashkortostan
- District: Sterlitamaksky District
- Time zone: UTC+5:00

Kononovsky (Russian: Кононовский) is a rural locality (a village) in Oktyabrsky Selsoviet, Sterlitamaksky District, Bashkortostan, Russia. The population was 291 as of 2010. There are 3 streets.

== Geography ==
Kononovsky is located 27 km southwest of Sterlitamak (the district's administrative centre) by road. Oktyabrskoye is the nearest rural locality.
