= Maxyutovo, Sterlitamaksky District, Republic of Bashkortostan =

Maksyutovo Максютово
- Village
- Location within Bashkortostan Location within Russia
- Coordinates: 53°24′N 55°44′E
- Country: Russia
- Region: Bashkortostan
- District: Sterlitamaksky District
- Time zone: UTC+5:00

Maksyutovo (Russian: Максютово; Bashkir: Мәҡсүт, Mäqsüt) is a rural locality (a village) in Ashkadarsky Selsoviet, Sterlitamaksky District, Bashkortostan, Russia. The population was 139 as of 2010. There are 2 streets.

== Geography ==
Maxyutovo is located 35 km southwest of Sterlitamak (the district's administrative centre) by road. Novofyodorovskoye is the nearest rural locality.
