= Kosyakovka =

Kosyakovka Косяковка
- Selo
- Location within Bashkortostan Location within Russia
- Coordinates: 53°42′N 56°01′E
- Country: Russia
- Region: Bashkortostan
- District: Sterlitamaksky District
- Time zone: UTC+5:00

Kosyakovka (Russian: Косяковка) is a rural locality (a selo) in Krasnoyarsky Selsoviet, Sterlitamaksky District, Bashkortostan, Russia. The population was 744 as of 2010. There are 6 streets.

== Geography ==
Kosyakovka is located 13 km northeast of Sterlitamak (the district's administrative centre) by road. Taneyevka and Sterlitamak are the nearest rural localities.
