= Talalayevka =

Talalayevka Талалаевка
- Selo
- Location within Bashkortostan Location within Russia
- Coordinates: 53°48′N 56°01′E
- Country: Russia
- Region: Bashkortostan
- District: Sterlitamaksky District
- Time zone: UTC+5:00

Talalayevka (Russian: Талалаевка) is a rural locality (a selo) in Podlesnensky Selsoviet, Sterlitamaksky District, Bashkortostan, Russia. The population was 590 as of 2010. There are 6 streets.

== Geography ==
Talalayevka is located 28 km north of Sterlitamak (the district's administrative centre) by road. Ishparsovo is the nearest rural locality.
