= Ayuchevo =

Ayuchevo Аючево
- Selo
- Location within Bashkortostan Location within Russia
- Coordinates: 53°26′N 55°47′E
- Country: Russia
- Region: Bashkortostan
- District: Sterlitamaksky District
- Time zone: UTC+5:00

Ayuchevo (Russian: Аючево; Bashkir: Айыусы, Ayıwsı) is a rural locality (a selo) and the administrative centre of Ayuchevsky Selsoviet, Sterlitamaksky District, Bashkortostan, Russia. The population was 297 as of 2010. There are 4 streets.

== Geography ==
Ayuchevo is located 31 km southwest of Sterlitamak (the district's administrative centre) by road. Ozerkovka is the nearest rural locality.
