= Novoaleshkino =

Novoaleshkino Новоалешкино
- Village
- Location within Bashkortostan Location within Russia
- Coordinates: 53°52′N 55°57′E
- Country: Russia
- Region: Bashkortostan
- District: Sterlitamaksky District
- Time zone: UTC+5:00

Novoaleshkino (Russian: Новоалешкино) is a rural locality (a village) in Podlesnensky Selsoviet, Sterlitamaksky District, Bashkortostan, Russia. The population was 24 as of 2010. There are 3 streets.

== Geography ==
Novoaleshkino is located 31 km north of Sterlitamak (the district's administrative centre) by road. Solovyovka is the nearest rural locality.
