= Karmaskaly =

Karmaskaly (Russian: Кармаскалы) is the name of two rural localities in the Republic of Bashkortostan, Russia:

- Karmaskaly, Karmaskalinsky District, Republic of Bashkortostan, a selo in Karmaskalinsky Selsoviet of Karmaskalinsky District; 54°22′N 56°11′E
- Karmaskaly, Sterlitamaksky District, Republic of Bashkortostan, a selo in Kazadayevsky Selsoviet of Sterlitamaksky District; 53°45′N 55°52′E
