= Zalivnoy =

Zalivnoy Заливной
- Selo
- Location within Bashkortostan Location within Russia
- Coordinates: 53°34′N 55°58′E
- Country: Russia
- Region: Bashkortostan
- District: Sterlitamaksky District
- Time zone: UTC+5:00

Zalivnoy (Russian: Заливной) is a rural locality (a selo) in Naumovsky Selsoviet, Sterlitamaksky District, Bashkortostan, Russia. The population was 401 as of 2010. There are 13 streets.

== Geography ==
Zalivnoy is located 10 km southeast of Sterlitamak (the district's administrative centre) by road. Pokrovka is the nearest rural locality.
