= Bogolyubovka, Sterlitamaksky District, Republic of Bashkortostan =

Bogolyubovka Боголюбовка
- Village
- Location within Bashkortostan Location within Russia
- Coordinates: 53°47′N 55°23′E
- Country: Russia
- Region: Bashkortostan
- District: Sterlitamaksky District
- Time zone: UTC+5:00

Bogolyubovka (Russian: Боголюбовка) is a rural locality (a village) in Konstantinogradovsky Selsoviet, Sterlitamaksky District, Bashkortostan, Russia. The population was 174 as of 2010. There are 3 streets.

== Geography ==
Bogolyubovka is located 44 km northwest of Sterlitamak (the district's administrative centre) by road. Konstantinogradovka is the nearest rural locality.
