= Zabelskoye =

Zabelskoye Забельское
- Selo
- Location within Bashkortostan Location within Russia
- Coordinates: 53°42′N 56°08′E
- Country: Russia
- Region: Bashkortostan
- District: Sterlitamaksky District
- Time zone: UTC+5:00

Zabelskoye (Russian: Забельское) is a rural locality (a selo) in Alataninsky Selsoviet, Sterlitamaksky District, Bashkortostan, Russia. The population was 200 as of 2010. There are 3 streets.

== Geography ==
Zabelskoye is located 26 km northeast of Sterlitamak (the district's administrative centre) by road. Alatana is the nearest rural locality.
