= Maryevka, Sterlitamaksky District, Republic of Bashkortostan =

Maryevka Марьевка
- Village
- Location within Bashkortostan Location within Russia
- Coordinates: 53°40′N 55°50′E
- Country: Russia
- Region: Bashkortostan
- District: Sterlitamaksky District
- Time zone: UTC+5:00

Maryevka (Russian: Марьевка) is a rural locality (a village) in Kazadayevsky Selsoviet, Sterlitamaksky District, Bashkortostan, Russia. The population was 56 as of 2010. There are 11 streets.

== Geography ==
Maryevka is located 10 km northwest of Sterlitamak (the district's administrative centre) by road. Kazadayevka is the nearest rural locality.
