= Nikolay Bober =

Russian politician (born 1947)

- Николай Бобер

Member of the State Assembly of the Republic of Bashkortostan
- In office 21 March 1995 – 29 March 1999

Personal details
- Born: Nikolay Vasilyevich Bober; 1 August 1947 (age 79) Yablunovka, Sterlitamaksky District, Bashkir ASSR, Russian SFSR, USSR
- Education: Ufa State Petroleum Technological University
- Profession: Politician

Nikolay Vasilyevich Bober (Russian: Николай Васильевич Бобер; born 1 August 1947) is a Russian politician who served as a member of the State Assembly of the Republic of Bashkortostan from 1995 to 1999.
