= Saratovka, Republic of Bashkortostan =

Saratovka Саратовка
- Village
- Location within Bashkortostan Location within Russia
- Coordinates: 53°36′N 55°29′E
- Country: Russia
- Region: Bashkortostan
- District: Sterlitamaksky District
- Time zone: UTC+5:00

Saratovka (Russian: Саратовка; Bashkir: Һарытау, Harıtaw) is a rural locality (a village) in Maximovksky Selsoviet, Sterlitamaksky District, Bashkortostan, Russia. The population was 148 as of 2010. There is 1 street.

== Geography ==
Saratovka is located 49 km west of Sterlitamak (the district's administrative centre) by road. Maximovka is the nearest rural locality.
