= Murdashevo =

Murdashevo Мурдашево
- Selo
- Location within Bashkortostan Location within Russia
- Coordinates: 53°23′N 55°48′E
- Country: Russia
- Region: Bashkortostan
- District: Sterlitamaksky District
- Time zone: UTC+5:00

Murdashevo (Russian: Мурдашево; Bashkir: Мырҙаш, Mırźaş) is a rural locality (a selo) in Ayuchevsky Selsoviet, Sterlitamaksky District, Bashkortostan, Russia. The population was 185 as of 2010. There are 2 streets.

== Geography ==
Murdashevo is located 35 km south of Sterlitamak (the district's administrative centre) by road. Romadanovka is the nearest rural locality.
