= Maximovka, Sterlitamaksky District, Republic of Bashkortostan =

Maximovka Максимовка
- Village
- Location within Bashkortostan Location within Russia
- Coordinates: 53°36′N 55°28′E
- Country: Russia
- Region: Bashkortostan
- District: Sterlitamaksky District
- Time zone: UTC+5:00

Maximovka (Russian: Максимовка) is a rural locality (a village) and the administrative centre of Maximovksky Selsoviet, Sterlitamaksky District, Bashkortostan, Russia. The population was 293 as of 2010. There are 3 streets.

== Geography ==
Maximovka is located 49 km west of Sterlitamak (the district's administrative centre) by road. Saratovka is the nearest rural locality.
