= Vostochny, Sterlitamaksky District, Republic of Bashkortostan =

Vostochny Восточный
- Village
- Location within Bashkortostan Location within Russia
- Coordinates: 53°43′N 55°55′E
- Country: Russia
- Region: Bashkortostan
- District: Sterlitamaksky District
- Time zone: UTC+5:00

Vostochny (Russian: Восточный) is a rural locality (a village) in Kazadayevsky Selsoviet, Sterlitamaksky District, Bashkortostan, Russia. The population was 17 as of 2010. There is 1 street.

== Geography ==
Vostochny is located 17 km north of Sterlitamak (the district's administrative centre) by road. Staroye Baryatino is the nearest rural locality.
