= Kunakbayevo, Sterlitamaksky District, Republic of Bashkortostan =

Kunakbayevo Кунакбаево
- Village
- Location within Bashkortostan Location within Russia
- Coordinates: 53°34′N 55°43′E
- Country: Russia
- Region: Bashkortostan
- District: Sterlitamaksky District
- Time zone: UTC+5:00

Kunakbayevo (Russian: Кунакбаево; Bashkir: Ҡунаҡбай, Qunaqbay) is a rural locality (a village) in Nikolayevsky Selsoviet, Sterlitamaksky District, Bashkortostan, Russia. The population was 105 as of 2010. There is one street.

== Geography ==
Kunakbayevo is located 23 km southwest of Sterlitamak (the district's administrative centre) by road. Preobrazhenovka is the nearest rural locality.
