= Staroye Baryatino =

Staroye Baryatino Старое Барятино
- Selo
- Location within Bashkortostan Location within Russia
- Coordinates: 53°43′N 55°56′E
- Country: Russia
- Region: Bashkortostan
- District: Sterlitamaksky District
- Time zone: UTC+5:00

Staroye Baryatino (Russian: Старое Барятино) is a rural locality (a selo) in Kazadayevsky Selsoviet, Sterlitamaksky District, Bashkortostan, Russia. The population was 33 as of 2010. There are 2 streets.

== Geography ==
Staroye Baryatino is located 12 km north of Sterlitamak (the district's administrative centre) by road. Vostochny is the nearest rural locality.
