= Karmaskaly, Sterlitamaksky District, Republic of Bashkortostan =

Karmaskaly Кармаскалы
- Selo
- Location within Bashkortostan Location within Russia
- Coordinates: 53°44′N 55°52′E
- Country: Russia
- Region: Bashkortostan
- District: Sterlitamaksky District
- Time zone: UTC+5:00

Karmaskaly (Russian: Кармаскалы; Bashkir: Ҡырмыҫҡалы, Qırmıśqalı) is a rural locality (a selo) in Kazadayevsky Selsoviet, Sterlitamaksky District, Bashkortostan, Russia. The population was 593 as of 2010. There are 23 streets.

== Geography ==
Karmaskaly is located 17 km northwest of Sterlitamak (the district's administrative centre) by road. Roshchinsky is the nearest rural locality.
