= Mikhaylovka, Sterlitamaksky District, Republic of Bashkortostan =

Mikhaylovka Михайловка
- Village
- Location within Bashkortostan Location within Russia
- Coordinates: 53°44′N 55°59′E
- Country: Russia
- Region: Bashkortostan
- District: Sterlitamaksky District
- Time zone: UTC+5:00

Mikhaylovka (Russian: Михайловка) is a rural locality (a village) in Krasnoyarsky Selsoviet, Sterlitamaksky District, Bashkortostan, Russia. The population was 6 as of 2010. There are 9 streets.

== Geography ==
Mikhaylovka is located 19 km north of Sterlitamak (the district's administrative centre) by road. Cherkassy is the nearest rural locality.
