= Yablunovka =

Yablunovka Яблуновка
- Village
- Location within Bashkortostan Location within Russia
- Coordinates: 53°36′N 55°17′E
- Country: Russia
- Region: Bashkortostan
- District: Sterlitamaksky District
- Time zone: UTC+5:00

Yablunovka (Russian: Яблуновка) is a rural locality (a village) in Maximovksky Selsoviet, Sterlitamaksky District, Bashkortostan, Russia. The population was 6 as of 2010. There are 2 streets.

== Geography ==
Yablunovka is located 65 km west of Sterlitamak (the district's administrative centre) by road. Kuganakbash is the nearest rural locality.
