= Novofyodorovskoye (rural locality) =

Novofyodorovskoye Новофедоровское
- Village
- Location within Bashkortostan Location within Russia
- Coordinates: 53°25′N 55°44′E
- Country: Russia
- Region: Bashkortostan
- District: Sterlitamaksky District
- Time zone: UTC+5:00

Novofyodorovskoye (Russian: Новофедоровское) is a rural locality (a village) and the administrative centre of Ashkadarsky Selsoviet, Sterlitamaksky District, Bashkortostan, Russia. The population was 328 as of 2010. There are 3 streets.

== Geography ==
Novofyodorovskoye is located 33 km southwest of Sterlitamak (the district's administrative centre) by road. Grigoryevka is the nearest rural locality.
