= FC Sodovik Sterlitamak =

Sodovik
- Full name: Football Club; Sodovik Sterlitamak
- Founded: 1961
- Dissolved: 2007
- Ground: Sodovik Stadium, Sterlitamak
- Capacity: 6,200
- Chairman: Alexander Zhivayev
- Manager: Gennady Gridin
- 2007: Russian First Division, 21st
Home colours	Away colours

FC Sodovik Sterlitamak (Russian: ФК «Содовик» Стерлитамак) was a Russian association football club based in Sterlitamak.

== History ==
FC Sodovik (literally: "soda worker") is a team owned by OAO Soda. The team played in the Republic of Bashkortostan championship, winning it three times in 1967, 1979, and 1991. In 1992, Sodovik replaced Kauchuk, another team from Sterlitamak, in the newly formed Russian Second League. Kauchuk had played in the Soviet Class B in 1966–1969, and in the Soviet Second League B in 1990–1991.

In 1994, Sodovik were moved to the Third League after restructuring of the leagues, and in 1996 they finished first in their zone to win promotion to the Second League. In 2001 and 2002 Sodovik were the runners-up in their Second Division zone.

In 2004, Sodovik were on course to become the winners of their zone, but one of their players, Zviad Jeladze, was proved to have false Russian citizenship. Foreign players are not allowed to play in the Second Division, and all games in which Dzheladze had taken part were declared forfeited by Sodovik. As a result, Sodovik lost 57 points and moved from first position in the league to the last one. However, the team managed to escape the relegation.

In 2005, Sodovik finished first in the Ural-Povolzhye zone and were promoted to the First Division. In 2006 the team finished sixth, recording the best result in history. They were then relegated to the Second Division from 21st place. Subsequently, they were left without funding, and the team was abolished.
