= Sodovik Stadium =

Sports venue in Sterlitamak, Russia

Sodovik Stadium (Sterlitamak)
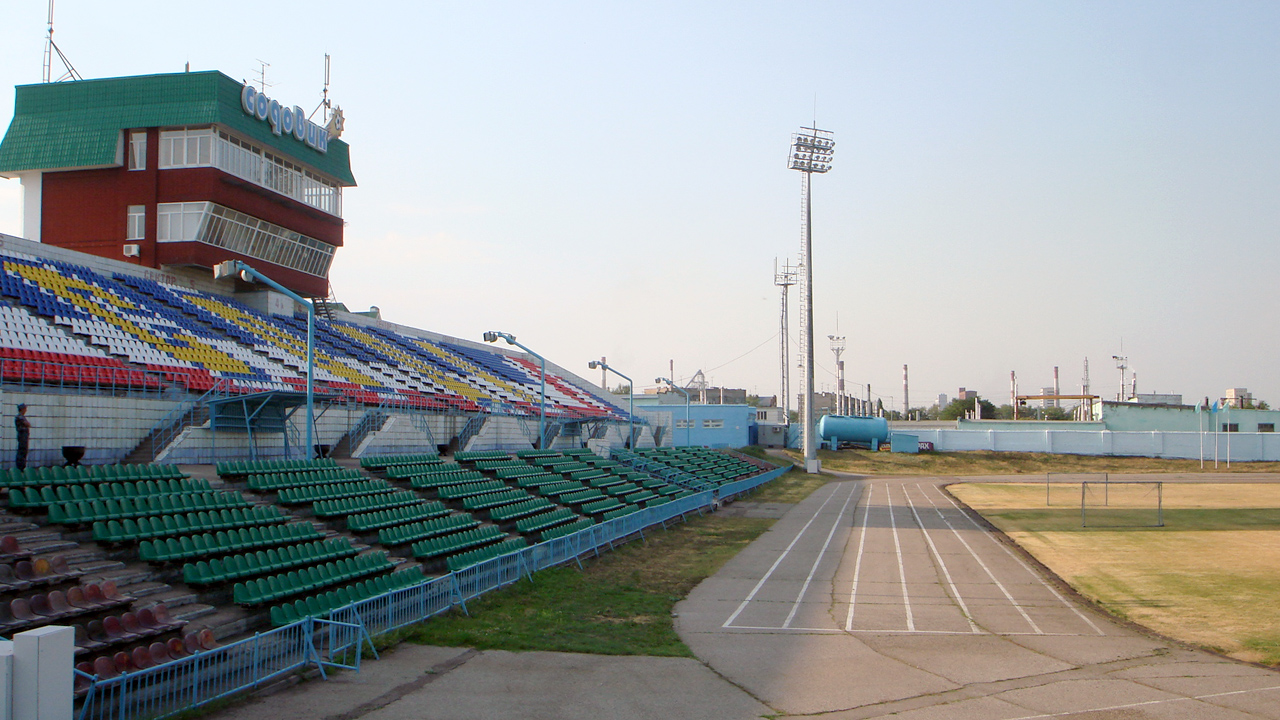
- Interactive map of Sodovik Stadium (Sterlitamak)
- Location: Sterlitamak, Bashkortostan, Russia
- Coordinates: 53°38′30.02″N 55°58′34.41″E
- Capacity: 5 180

Construction
- Opened: 2000

Tenant
- FC Sodovik Sterlitamak

Sodovik Stadium is a multi-use stadium in Sterlitamak, Russia. It is currently used mostly for football matches and was the home ground of the former football team FC Sodovik Sterlitamak. The stadium holds 5,180 people and was opened in 2000.
