= Spartak Akhmetov =

Russian politician (born 1949)

Spartak Akhmetov Спартак Ахметов
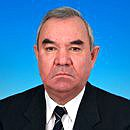

Head of the administration of Sterlitamak
- In office 1992–2007
- Succeeded by: Ilgiz Sharipov

Member of the State Duma
- In office 2007–2011

Personal details
- Born: June 8, 1949 (age 76) Sterlibashevo, RSFSR, USSR
- Party: United Russia
- Education: Salavat Industrial College; Ufa State Petroleum Technological University

Spartak Galeyevich Akhmetov (Russian: Спартак Галеевич Ахметов, Bashkir: Спартак Ғәли улы Әхмәтов, born 8 June 1949) is a retired Russian politician who was a member of the 5th State Duma. Akhmetov served as the head of the administration of Sterlitamak from 1992 to 2007.

== Career ==
In 1968 he graduated from the Salavat Industrial Technical School of the Ministry of Petrochemical Industry of the USSR.

From 1968 to 1970 he served in the Soviet Army.

Between 1970 and 1986 he worked in engineering and managerial positions at the trusts Sterlitamakstroy and Vostokneftezavodmontazh.

In 1979 he graduated from the Ufa Petroleum Institute.

From 1986 to 1987 he held the post of Second Secretary of the Sterlitamak City Committee of the CPSU.

Between 1987 and 1992 he served as Chairman of the Executive Committee of the Sterlitamak City Council.

In 1989 he graduated from the Sverdlovsk Higher Party School.

Since 1992 he has been Head of the Administration of Sterlitamak and a deputy of the Chamber of Representatives of the State Assembly of Bashkortostan.

On 2 December 2007 he was elected deputy of the fifth convocation of the State Duma as part of the federal list of candidates nominated by the All-Russian political party United Russia.

== Awards ==
- Order of Friendship
- Order of the Badge of Honour
- Honoured Builder of the Russian Federation
- Honoured Builder of the Republic of Bashkorostan
- Honoured citizen of Sterlitamak.
