= Levashovka =

Levashovka Левашовка
- Selo
- Location within Voronezh Oblast Location within Russia
- Coordinates: 51°25′N 40°18′E
- Country: Russia
- Region: Voronezh Oblast
- District: Anninsky District
- Time zone: UTC+3:00

Levashovka (Russian: Левашовка) is a rural locality (a selo) and the administrative center of Verkhnetoydenskoye Rural Settlement, Anninsky District, Voronezh Oblast, Russia. The population was 295 as of 2010. There are 2 streets.

== Geography ==
Levashovka is located 14 km east of Anna (the district's administrative centre) by road. Khleborodnoye is the nearest rural locality.
