= Sterlitamak =

City in the Republic of Bashkortostan, Russia

Sterlitamak Стерлитамак
- City

Other transcription(s)
  - Bashkir: Стәрлетамаҡ
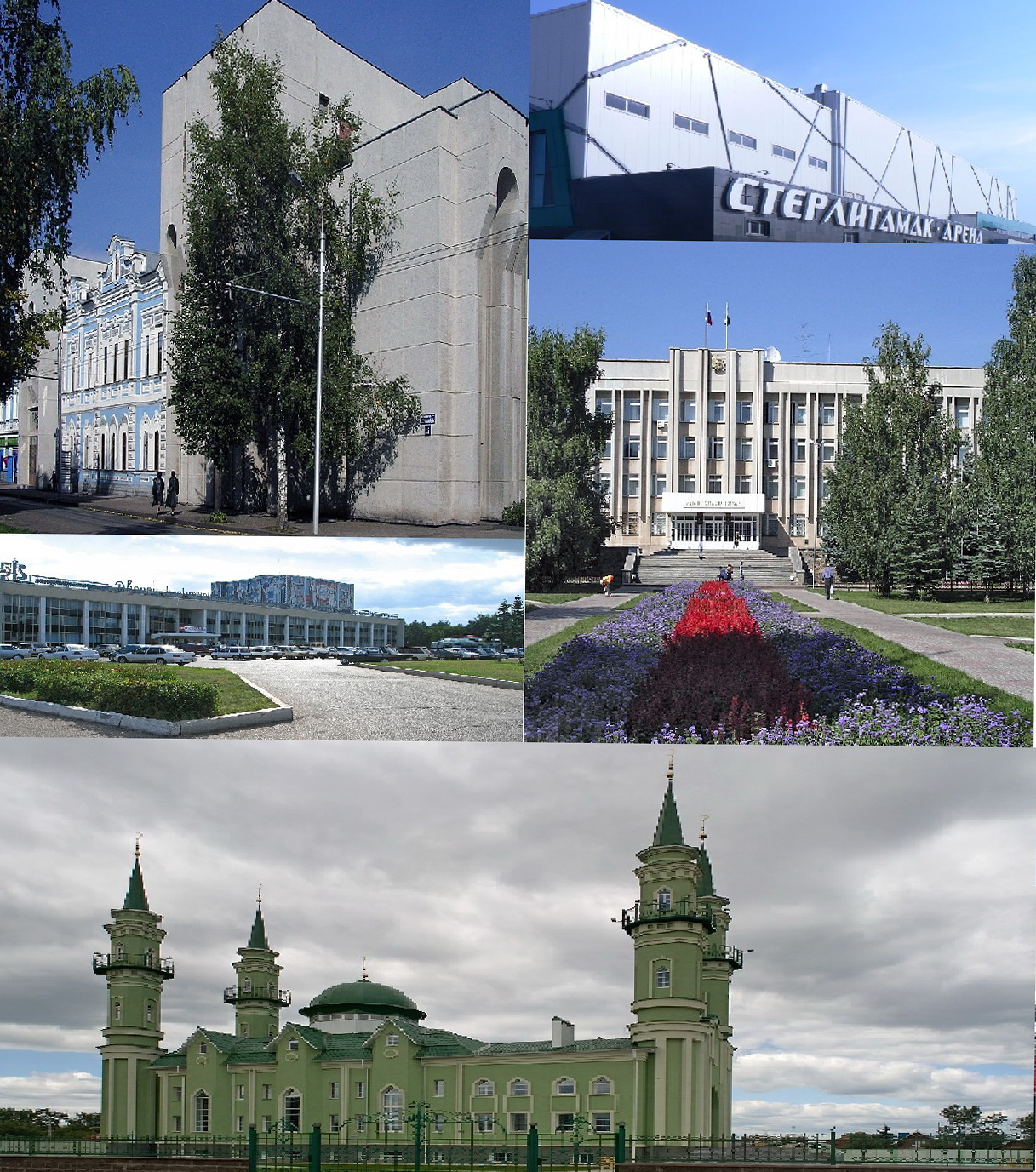
- View of Sterlitamak

- Flag Coat of arms
- Interactive map of Sterlitamak
- Location of Sterlitamak Sterlitamak (Bashkortostan)
- Coordinates: 53°37′10″N 55°57′41″E
- Country: Russia
- Federal subject: Bashkortostan
- Founded: 1735
- City status since: 1781

Government
  - Body: Council
  - Head: Emil Shaimardanov since September 19, 2024
- Elevation: 150 m (490 ft)

Population
  - Estimate (2021): 274,134 )

Administrative status
  - Subordinated to: city of republic significance of Sterlitamak
  - Capital of: city of republic significance of Sterlitamak, Sterlitamaksky District

Municipal status
  - Urban okrug: Sterlitamak Urban Okrug
  - Capital of: Sterlitamak Urban Okrug, Sterlitamaksky Municipal District
- Time zone: UTC+5 (MSK+2)
- Postal code: 453100
- Dialing code: +7 3473
- OKTMO ID: 80745000001
- Website: sterlitamakadm.ru

Sterlitamak (Russian: Стерлитама́к, IPA: [stʲɪrlʲɪtɐˈmak]; Bashkir: Стәрлетамаҡ, romanized: Stärletamaq; Bashkir pronunciation: [stær.ˌlɪ̞.tɑ.ˈmɑq]) is the second-largest city in the Republic of Bashkortostan, Russia, after the capital, Ufa. The city is located on the left bank of the Belaya River (a tributary of the Kama River), 121 kilometers (75 mi) from Ufa. The city's name comes from the Bashkir language and literally means "mouth of the Sterlya river". According to data released by Bashstat, Sterlitamak proper had a population of 277,410 at the time of the census. The permanent population of Sterlitamak as of January 1, 2023, was 279,174 people.

== Geography ==
Sterlitamak is located just south of the geographical center of the Republic of Bashkortostan, 121 kilometers (75 mi) from Ufa. Approximately 50 kilometers (31 mi) to the east of the city are the Ural Mountains; to the west the East European Plain begins. In the vicinity of Sterlitamak (inside the Belaya basin) are the Shikhan Mountains (Yurak Tau, Kush Tau, Shakh Tau, and Tra Tau), which are unique geological formations. In the area of Mount Kush Tau, there are children summer camps and the Shikhany Sanatorium; there is also a ski base on the slope of the mountain.

Originally, the town was built in the area between the Ashkadar and Sterlya Rivers. This area is now considered the historical center and is known as the "Old Town". Subsequently, Sterlitamak was built mainly to the west and north.

The Sterlya, which falls into the Ashkadar River to the east, flows through the central part of the city. One train bridge and four regular bridges cross the Sterlya, and another one is under construction. In the southeastern part, the Ashkadar separates the Zaashkadarye Microdistrict from the main part of the city. In the east, Sterlitamak borders the Belaya River, which forms the boundary between Sterlitamaksky and Ishimbaysky Districts. In the south, near the heavy machinery factory, the city is bordered by the Olkhovka River, which is also an influx of the Ashkadar.

== History ==
At the beginning of the 18th century, a post house ("Holes") was situated on the Ufa-Orenburg road where Sterlitamak now stands. A merchant, Savva Tetushev, by decree of the Empress Catherine the Great, founded a marina on the river Ashkadar, which after the merger with the post office became known as the "Sterlitamak salt pier".

During Pugachev's Rebellion of 1773–1775, Sterlitamak was under the control of insurgents, and was subsequently burned. After the restoration, it became the administrative center of Sterlitamaksky Uyezd, and was subsequently granted town status in 1781.

The city grew rapidly during industrialization in the late 19th century. At the time, local landowners established beer brewing, vodka distilling, and leatherworking industries.

Prior to the abolition of serfdom, the most influential landowners of Sterlitamaksky Uyezd were the Levashovs (from the village of Levashovka, now a part of the city), the Mikhaylovs (from the village of Mikhaylovka; now Mikhaylovka Microdistrict), and the Belousovs (from Belousovo; merged into the city in 2001). In the town, there were private companies and a variety of handicraft industries (leather and leather products, flour mill, the production of vodka and beer). Major employers of the city were Usmanov, Bayazitov, and Utyamyshev. After the abolition of serfdom, the city grew significantly in numbers and territory; there were large-scale production enterprises. In 1870, the building of Sterlitamak City Duma was constructed.

After the February Revolution, Sterlitamak Council nationalized the banks, the telegraph, and the main industrial enterprises in the city. By the decree of the Central Executive Committee on March 23, 1919, Bashkir Autonomous Soviet Socialist Republic (BASSR) was proclaimed, and Sterlitamak became the capital of the autonomy. Later, in 1922, the capital was moved to Ufa as the Soviet government began transforming the town into an industrial center.

Before World War II, Sterlitamak was growing rapidly, mainly due to consolidation of enterprises and the construction of new ones. In 1922, the first power plant began operation, supplying the mills and sawmills with energy. A leather sheepskin factory and sawmill were merged into one large sawmill.

In 1930, Sterlitamaksky District was created (at that time 24,000 people lived in Sterlitamak). In 1932, oil started to be extracted within the district. Two towns were established in the vicinity of Sterlitamak to tend to the oil fields: Ishimbay 21 kilometers (13 mi) southeast and Salavat 26 kilometers (16 mi) to the south. At the same time, the railway was laid at Sterlitamak (mainly for freight), and in 1934 the first freight train arrived. In connection with all these changes, the population of the town prior to 1939 increased by 58% and reached 37,900 people.

During the Great Patriotic War, many industries were evacuated to Sterlitamak: soda and cement factories, the "Red Proletarian" factory, Lenin Machine-Tool Plant, Moscow Shoe Factory, and Voronezh State Drama Theater.

In 1960, a telephone relay station was built in Sterlitamak. The first trolleybus line in BASSR was put into operation in Sterlitamak in 1961, primarily due to the bad environmental situation in the 1980s. By the end of 1980, Sterlitamak was listed as one of the most polluted cities in the country because of the amount of harmful emissions. Due to the sharp rise in employment capacity in the city, it was decided to extend the city further to the east, to the Belaya River, and to construct bypass roads for freight transport from the west between Sterlitamak and Salavat.

=== Meteorite ===
Near midnight on May 17, 1990, a meteorite fell into a field 20 km west of Sterlitamak and made a crater about 10 m in size and 5 m in depth with surrounding ejecta. Several fragments up to 6 kg were found in and near the crater. One year later, the thumbprinted main mass of 315 kg was found when digging out the crater. The meteorite is made of iron of the octahedrite (IIIAB) type. The main mass is now in the Museum of Archaeology and Ethnography, Ufa Scientific Center, the Russian Academy of Science.

== Population ==
=== Number of population ===
According to data released by Bashstat, Sterlitamak had a population of 277,410 at the time of the 2020 census. Compared to the 2010 census, when 273,486 people were registered, there is a slight increase.

=== National composition ===
The national composition of the population of Sterlitamak according to the results of the 2020 census (excluding 6933 people who did not indicate their nationality):

- Bashkirs - 49,846 people,
- Russians - 142,153 people,
- Tatars - 59,713 people,
- Chuvash people - 9,998 people,
- Mari people - 199 people,
- Ukrainians - 1,873 people,
- Mordvins - 1,719 people,
- Belarusians - 145 people,
- Udmurt people - 42 people,
- persons of other nationalities - 4,789 people

=== Languages ===
Language proficiency and use of languages by the population of Sterlitamak (according to the results of the All-Russian Population Census of 2020, the languages with the largest number of people who speak them) include:

- Russian language - 272,417 people (271,153 people use it in everyday life),
- Bashkir language - 31,598 people (28,792 people),
- Tatar language - 32,847 people (29,311 people),
- English language - 6,223 people (2,535 people),
- Chuvash language - 4,626 people (4,022 people),
- German language - 1,058 people (295 people),
- Ukrainian language - 824 people (614 people),
- Mordvinic language - 786 people (664 people),
- Uzbek language - 622 people (448 people),
- Mari language - 82 people (68 people),
- Udmurt language - 22 people (10 people),
- other languages not listed above - 2,765 people (2,077 people use them in everyday life)

== Ecology ==
During the 1970s, in connection with the bad environment in the city, there were projects to make the city greener. There was even a program in which each student had to plant a tree, and according to former Mayor Spartak Akhmetov, the child who planted a tree in his childhood, will feel responsibility to the problems of pollution of his native city. As a result, by 2007 the number of traditional Russian birch trees had increased by 350% and surpassed even Samara, which had a million trees at the time.

In 1987, the Council of Ministers of the USSR passed a decision to improve the ecological situation in the city. Currently, there are many gardening and landscaping programs in Sterlitamak; republican and municipal budgets have allocated the necessary funds to accomplish these objectives, attracting more and more people to city landscaping and improvement.

Both Bashkortostan and Sterlitamak have implemented a federal program for renovating housing and communal services. The program has operated in the city since 2008, but few buildings have actually been renovated with balconies, new tile roofs, with streamlined elevators, new sewers, and repaired doors.

One result of the landscaping and improvement programs is the title of "Golden City of Russia" received by Sterlitamak. In 2007, the city was awarded the title of "the most comfortable city in Russia" among cities with populations up to a million people. In just 15 years, Sterlitamak went from one of the most polluted cities to one of the cleanest and greenest cities in Russia. One reason for the sharp improvement in the environment and livability was a unique strategy by the city administration on key industries—each of the seventeen largest plants were given responsibility for an area of the city that they must serve. Other reasons included a campaign for street cleanliness, the mentality of the residents, and the high sense of responsibility of city utility services.

In addition to the honorary title of "Golden City of Russia", in 2009, the municipal service of park management of Sterlitamak took the first place "Crystal Wheel 2009" among the city parks of Russia and CIS countries under the nomination of "Best Amusement Park with the number of visitors from 100 thousand to 250 thousand people per year".

For more than five years, this competition is being held in Sochi, in order to identify and disseminate the best of positive experiences in different areas of park operations and high service quality standards in the field of recreation and family entertainment. Its geography is quite wide: compete park management from Moscow, Krasnodar, Almetyevsk, Sterlitamak, Mytishchi, Tyumen, as well as the cities of CIS countries. This year, the competition was supported by the Ministry of Culture of Russia and has grown to even more significant scale. In Sterlitamak, the merging of all city parks into one municipal enterprise has significantly improved their logistical base, diversified their attractions, and increased their popularity among townspeople.

== Climate ==
Sterlitamak has a humid continental climate (Köppen climate classification Dfb) with cold winters and warm summers.

Climate data for Sterlitamak (1991–2020, extremes 1924–present)
| Month | Jan | Feb | Mar | Apr | May | Jun | Jul | Aug | Sep | Oct | Nov | Dec | Year |
|---|---|---|---|---|---|---|---|---|---|---|---|---|---|
| Record high °C (°F) | 4.0 (39.2) | 7.8 (46.0) | 16.6 (61.9) | 31.2 (88.2) | 36.7 (98.1) | 38.0 (100.4) | 40.5 (104.9) | 39.1 (102.4) | 35.5 (95.9) | 25.1 (77.2) | 16.1 (61.0) | 6.8 (44.2) | 40.5 (104.9) |
| Mean daily maximum °C (°F) | −8.1 (17.4) | −6.5 (20.3) | 0.4 (32.7) | 12.1 (53.8) | 21.4 (70.5) | 25.3 (77.5) | 26.9 (80.4) | 25.0 (77.0) | 18.4 (65.1) | 9.7 (49.5) | −0.1 (31.8) | −6.6 (20.1) | 9.8 (49.6) |
| Daily mean °C (°F) | −12.0 (10.4) | −11.3 (11.7) | −4.6 (23.7) | 6.3 (43.3) | 14.5 (58.1) | 18.8 (65.8) | 20.7 (69.3) | 18.4 (65.1) | 12.1 (53.8) | 5.1 (41.2) | −3.3 (26.1) | −10.3 (13.5) | 4.5 (40.1) |
| Mean daily minimum °C (°F) | −16.0 (3.2) | −15.8 (3.6) | −9.3 (15.3) | 0.8 (33.4) | 7.7 (45.9) | 12.5 (54.5) | 14.6 (58.3) | 12.6 (54.7) | 7.0 (44.6) | 1.4 (34.5) | −6.1 (21.0) | −13.9 (7.0) | −0.4 (31.3) |
| Record low °C (°F) | −47.6 (−53.7) | −43.8 (−46.8) | −37.6 (−35.7) | −23.9 (−11.0) | −8.0 (17.6) | −2.6 (27.3) | 3.1 (37.6) | −0.1 (31.8) | −7.6 (18.3) | −26.2 (−15.2) | −36.0 (−32.8) | −42.1 (−43.8) | −47.6 (−53.7) |
| Average precipitation mm (inches) | 46 (1.8) | 37 (1.5) | 38 (1.5) | 31 (1.2) | 45 (1.8) | 57 (2.2) | 55 (2.2) | 56 (2.2) | 41 (1.6) | 51 (2.0) | 45 (1.8) | 49 (1.9) | 551 (21.7) |
| Average precipitation days | 18.0 | 13.3 | 12.5 | 9.0 | 10.7 | 11.7 | 11.9 | 11.4 | 11.1 | 14.0 | 14.6 | 17.1 | 155.4 |
| Mean monthly sunshine hours | 29 | 72 | 139 | 214 | 283 | 295 | 294 | 250 | 167 | 87 | 41 | 27 | 1,898 |
Source 1: Pogoda.ru.net
Source 2: Climatebase (precipitation days, sun 1939–2012)

== Administrative and municipal status ==
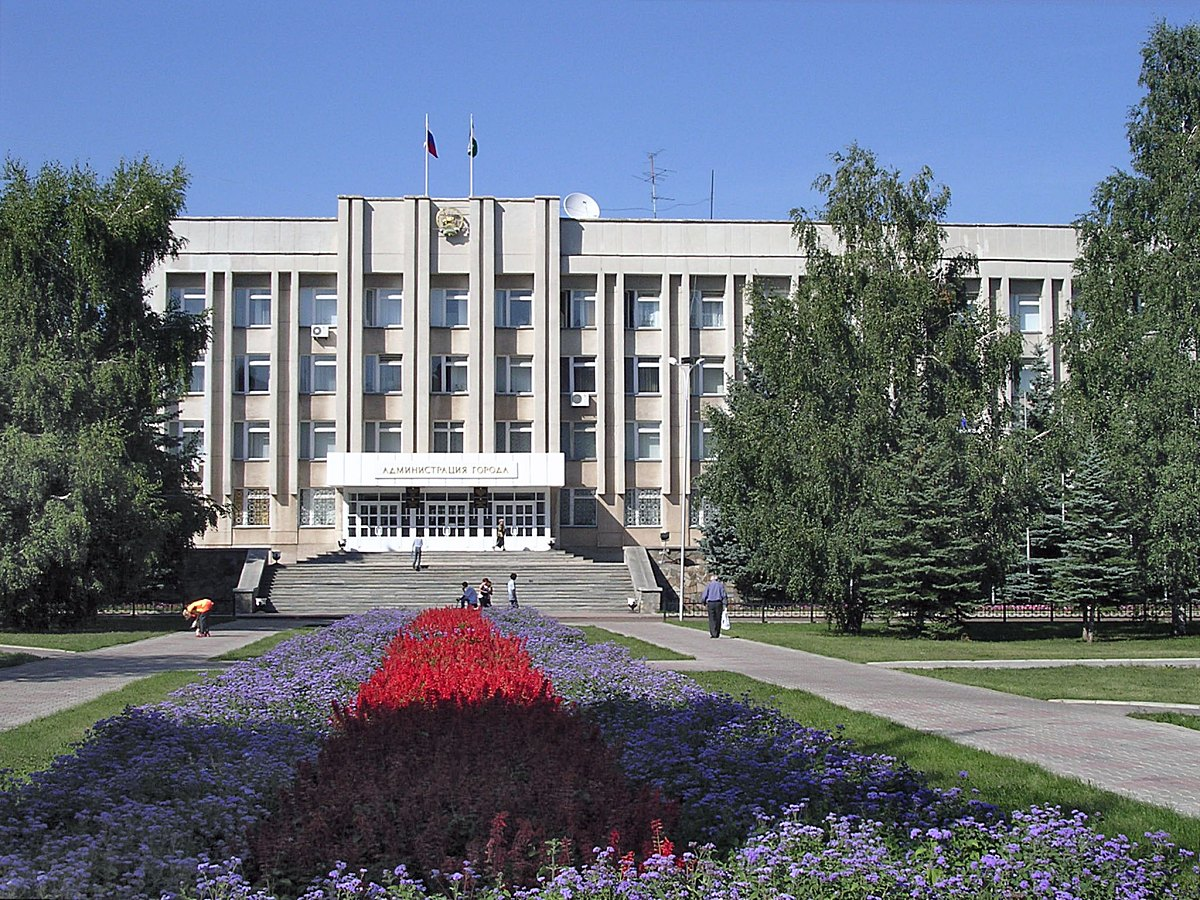
Sterlitamak City Administration building

Within the framework of the administrative divisions, Sterlitamak serves as the administrative center of Sterlitamaksky District, even though it is not a part of it. As an administrative division, it is incorporated separately as the city of republic significance of Sterlitamak—an administrative unit with the status equal to that of the districts. As a municipal division, the city of republic significance of Sterlitamak is incorporated as Sterlitamak Urban Okrug.

== Institutions ==
The city has 12 hospitals accounting for 2,700 hospital beds and 18 outpatient clinics.

After the merger of the institutions, according to 2020 data, the total number of hospitals and polyclinics in the city is 10 organizations with branches attached to organizations.

The city has one TV broadcast station and one radio channel.

=== Cultural ===
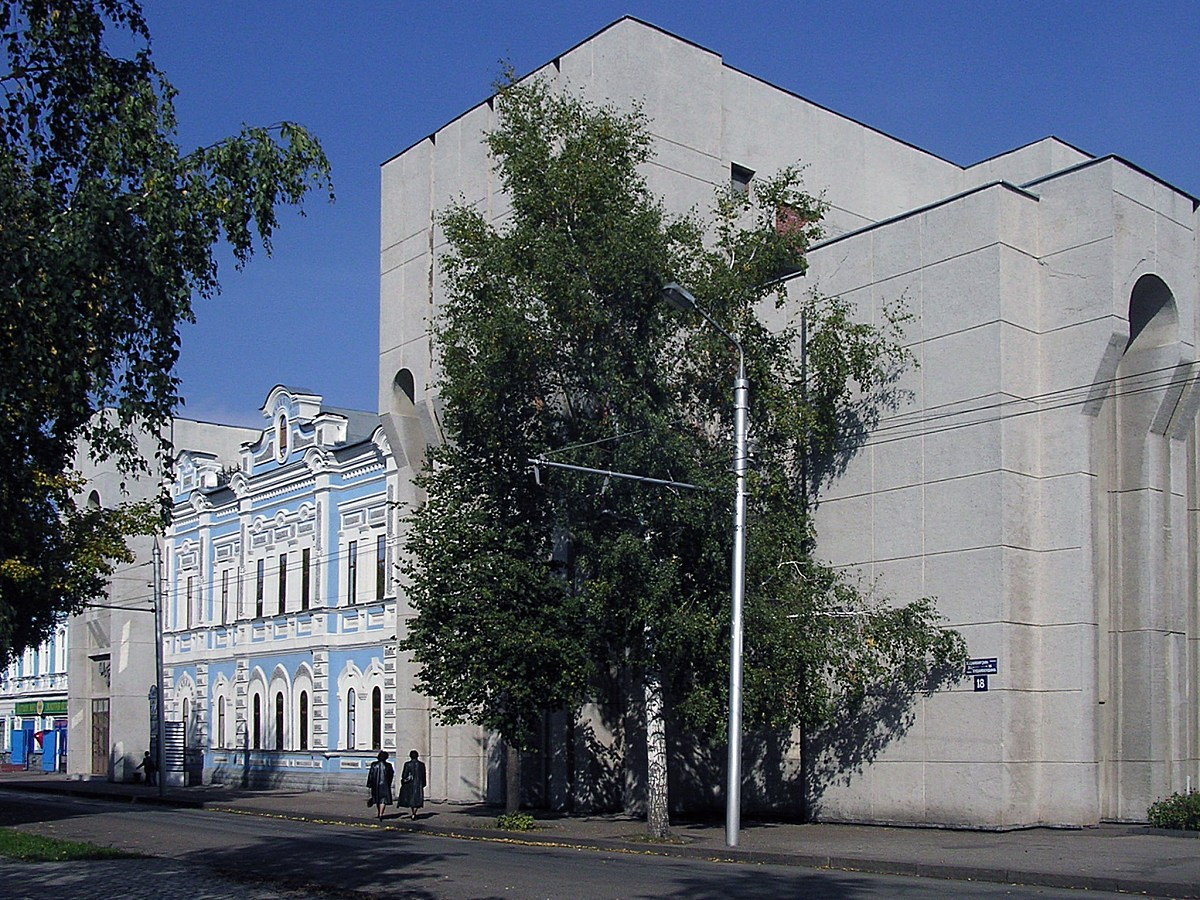
Russian Drama Theater

Major sports facilities in Sterlitamak currently operating include three stadiums (a sports stadium, stadium Sodovik, and stadium Sportakademiya) and two swimming pools (with a length of track, 25 meters).

Cultural sites in the city include the Sterlitamak Historical Museum, Art Gallery of Bashkir State, Art Museum MV Nesterova, "Theatrical Association, the Sterlitamak" (which includes the State Russian Drama Theater, Bashkir Drama Theater, and Dance Theater), Theater-studio "Benefis", and the City Philharmonic. There are 3 cinemas ("Iskra", cinema "Salavat" with 2 cinema halls, a children's "Pioneer"), 5 palaces and houses of culture, and the Palace of Pioneers and schoolchildren named after AP Gaidar.

By 2007, the city participating in the professional football club (PFC) "Sodovik" and took part in the First Division Championship of Russia on football. Unfortunately, funding was discontinued after a change of management in Soda Company, who sponsored PFC "Sodovik". The new management of the company has found the funding of the football club unprofitable. By early 2008, a children's football school was shut down as part of the elimination of the organization PFC "Sodovik". Around 300 boys from ages 8 to 18 were dropped out from the football club.

=== Education ===
There are 57 kindergartens, 35 schools, six high schools, one lyceum, eight vocational schools, seven colleges, SKSEiP trade school, branches Ufa State Oil Technical University, Bashkir State University, Ural State University of Physical Culture (Sterlitamakskij Physical Culture Institute), Ufa State Aviation Technical University, Modern Humanitarian Academy (WGA), Eastern Economic State University (VEGU).

== Attractions ==
=== Parks and squares ===
- Yuri Gagarin Park
- Victory Park
- Marshal G.K. Zhukov Square
- S.M. Kirov Park
- Park of Culture and Leisure of Sodovik.

=== Monuments and sculptural compositions ===
- Monument to the Soldiers-Internationalists
- Monument on the 5th verst of the Ufimsky tract (the place of execution of members of the Sterlitamak
- Military Revolutionary Committee in 1918)
- Monument to Vladimir Lenin - on Lenin Street
- Monument "Liberation"
- Monument to Home Front Workers
- Monument to the first teacher
- Monument to the Soviet pilot-cosmonaut Yuri Alekseevich Gagarin
- Monument to the father
- Sculptural composition "Hello" (monument to the family)
- Sculpture of the Mother

== Demographics ==
Historical population
| Year | Pop. | ±% |
|---|---|---|
| 1897 | 15,550 | — |
| 1926 | 24,609 | +58.3% |
| 1939 | 38,786 | +57.6% |
| 1959 | 111,572 | +187.7% |
| 1970 | 185,956 | +66.7% |
| 1979 | 220,462 | +18.6% |
| 1989 | 247,736 | +12.4% |
| 2002 | 264,362 | +6.7% |
| 2010 | 273,486 | +3.5% |
| 2021 | 277,410 | +1.4% |
Source: Censuses

== Economy ==
Sterlitamak is a developed industrial city with complete infrastructure and a good transport system. Its main industries include chemical production, mechanical engineering, and food and alcohol production.

=== Industry ===
Sterlitamak is a large center of chemical industry. The economic potential of the city is largely determined by a few major chemical and petrochemical enterprises. By 2008, they had produced goods worth a total of 37 billion 340 million rubles; major companies include Bashkir Soda Company (accounting for 13 billion 788 million rubles), Caustic Inc. (10 billion 344 million rubles), and Sterlitamak Petrochemical Plant (JSC SPP) (3 billion 868 million rubles). JSC SPP remains Russia's only supplier of phenolic antioxidants for rubber production; it has also continued development of the production stabilizers series Agidol. Tough times were upon JSC "Rubber", "Synthesis-Rubber" and "Vanguard".

Mechanical engineering and machine tool industries are also significant in Sterlitamak, including the Sterlitamak Machine Tool Works, Red Proletarian, Car-Repair Plant, Plant Stroymash, and Inmash. In addition, there are a few building enterprises in the city. For the first time in the past 14 years, Sodovik reached a cement production volume of over 1 million tons. The largest work construction company is JSC Trest Sterlitamakstroy.

There is also a developed food industry. The city has plants producing vodka (subsidiary Bashspirt) and beer (Heineken). Production Plant Stalk (alcohol-vodka production) and a brewery Shihan (until 2005) are known and popular not only in the republic, but in many neighboring regions of Russia. Sterlitamakskij Bakery, which celebrated its 100-year-anniversary in 2009, and also widely known in the country and the Volga region. There are also two large dairy factories and four sausage factories in the city.

In 2008, industrial enterprises were calculated to have shipped more than 51.6 billion rubles worth of produce to consumers.

== Transportation ==
=== Roads ===
The main streets of the city include:

- Lenin Street, which runs from Ufa road to Eternal Flame
- Khudayberdin Street, which runs from [Rajewski] tract (bus station) to the Ashkadar River
- Mira Street (Street of Peace), which connects VTS Microdistrict to the city center
- Kommunisticheskaya Street, Artyom Street, and Oktober Street, which link Yugo-Zapadny (South-West), Solnechny (Sunny), and Bolnichny (Medical) Microdistricts to the city center.

A bypass road from the west bends around the city, allowing transit vehicles traveling on the Ufa–Orenburg highway to bypass Sterlitamak and Salavat.

=== Public transport ===
==== Trolleybus ====
The main mode of public transport in Sterlitamak is the trolleybus system, which consists of 18 main routes and 3 supplementary routes, served by 135 trolleybuses each day. It carries more than 230,000 passengers per day, representing about 80% of public transport usage in Sterlitamak. It has become a tradition for Sterlitamak to extend trolleybus routes to serve new construction sites. This expansive network explains the great popularity of the trolleybus in the city.

Most trolleys have been purchased from the Bashkir Trolleybus Plant.

==== Bus ====
The city also has a bus service. Major bus routes pass through the main streets of the city; most repeat trolleybus routes but are less frequent than trolleys. Bus transportation is provided by Sterlitamak Passenger Motor Transportation Enterprise (GUP Bashavtotrans). These are comfortable buses, with a lowered stance, a Bashkir brand NEFAZ.

==== Other types of public transport ====
The city also has shuttle buses, which exceed the bus and trolley buses in speed and maneuverability (significant benefits, due to the increase of traffic jams in the city). On July 25, 2008, Gazelle minibuses were forbidden to be driven in the city, a step taken because their engines do not satisfy vehicle emission standards set by Euro 3; they were replaced by Mercedes Sprinter, Volkswagen Transporter, and Peugeot Boxer minibuses. All these foreign brands are equipped with engines satisfying Euro 3 and Euro 4 standards, and have a high level of security. In the spring of 2009, the city administration gave permission for passengers on the "Gazelle", provided that their number does not exceed 40 units.

=== Intercity ===
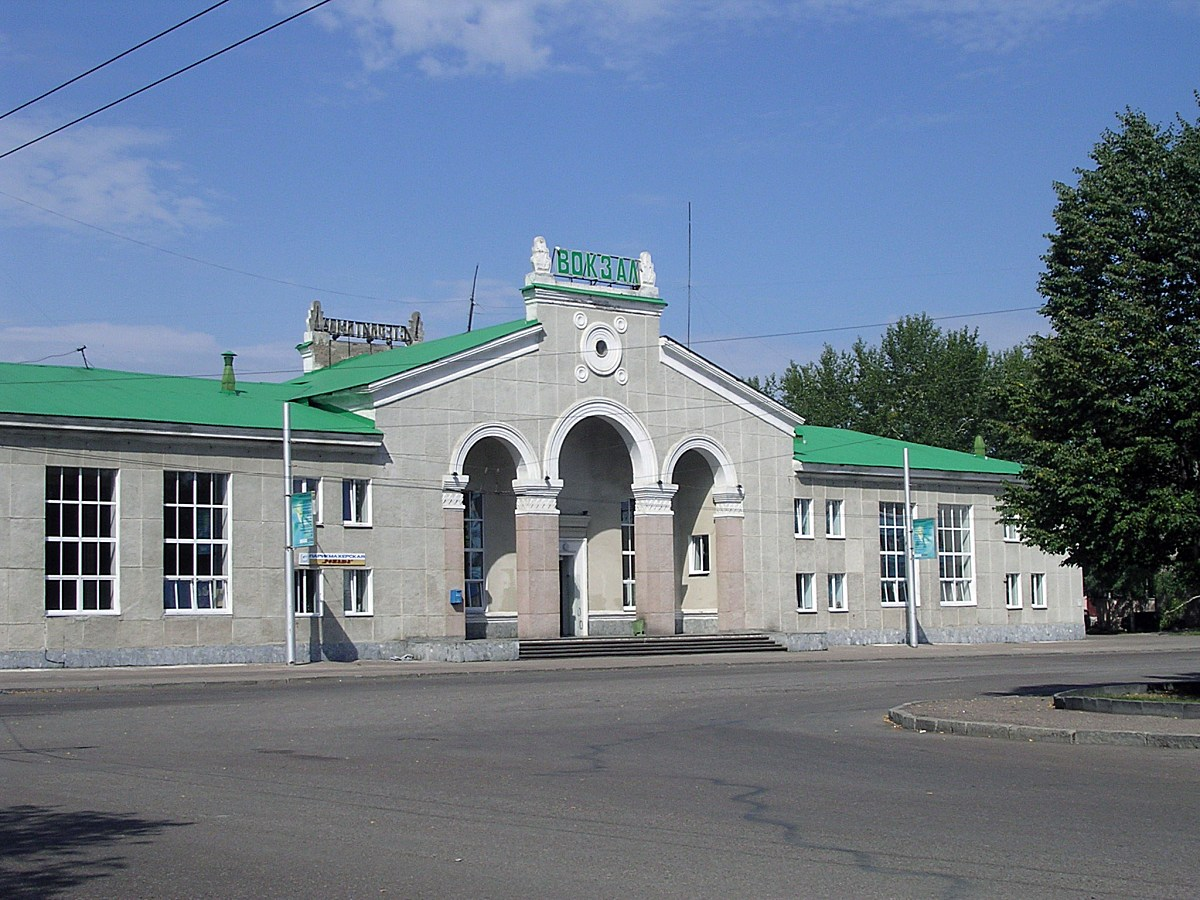
Train station

==== Railway ====
The city has a station on the segment of non-electrified Ufa–Orenburg route, but this is out of passenger demand and is instead used mainly for cargo transportation. The main disadvantage of rail transport in this direction is its very low speed; the train to Ufa will take approximately 5 hours, whereas buses take only 2.5–3 hours by road. This is because a segment of the main line is single-track.

On November 14, 2021, the first "Trip to Hogwarts by Train" took place in the Republic of Bashkortostan. The route began in Sterlitamak, went to White Lake in Bashkortostan, and returned to Sterlitamak. Along the way, passengers were accompanied by characters from the Harry Potter universe.

== Sport ==
The City Stadium (Gorodskoy Stadion) previously hosted the association football team FC Sodovik Sterlitamak but they moved to the Sodovik Stadium, which was built in 2000. The City Stadium suffered from investment and is used as a motorcycle speedway venue for the Metkor Sterlitamak speedway team, who raced in the Russian Team Speedway Championship during 2006.

== Notable people ==
- Anton Anchin (born 1990) – swimmer
- Tatyana Lebedeva (born 1976) – Russian track and field athlete who competes in both the long jump and triple jump events
- Olga Obrezkova – an athlete and International Master of Sports of Russia (1997) in weightlifting
- Viktor Shapovalov (born 1965) – racing driver
- Aleksandra Soldatova (born 1998), rhythmic gymnast
