= Sterlitamaksky District =

Sterlitamaksky District Стерлитамакский район (Russian)
- District

Other transcription(s)
  - Bashkir: Стәрлетамаҡ районы
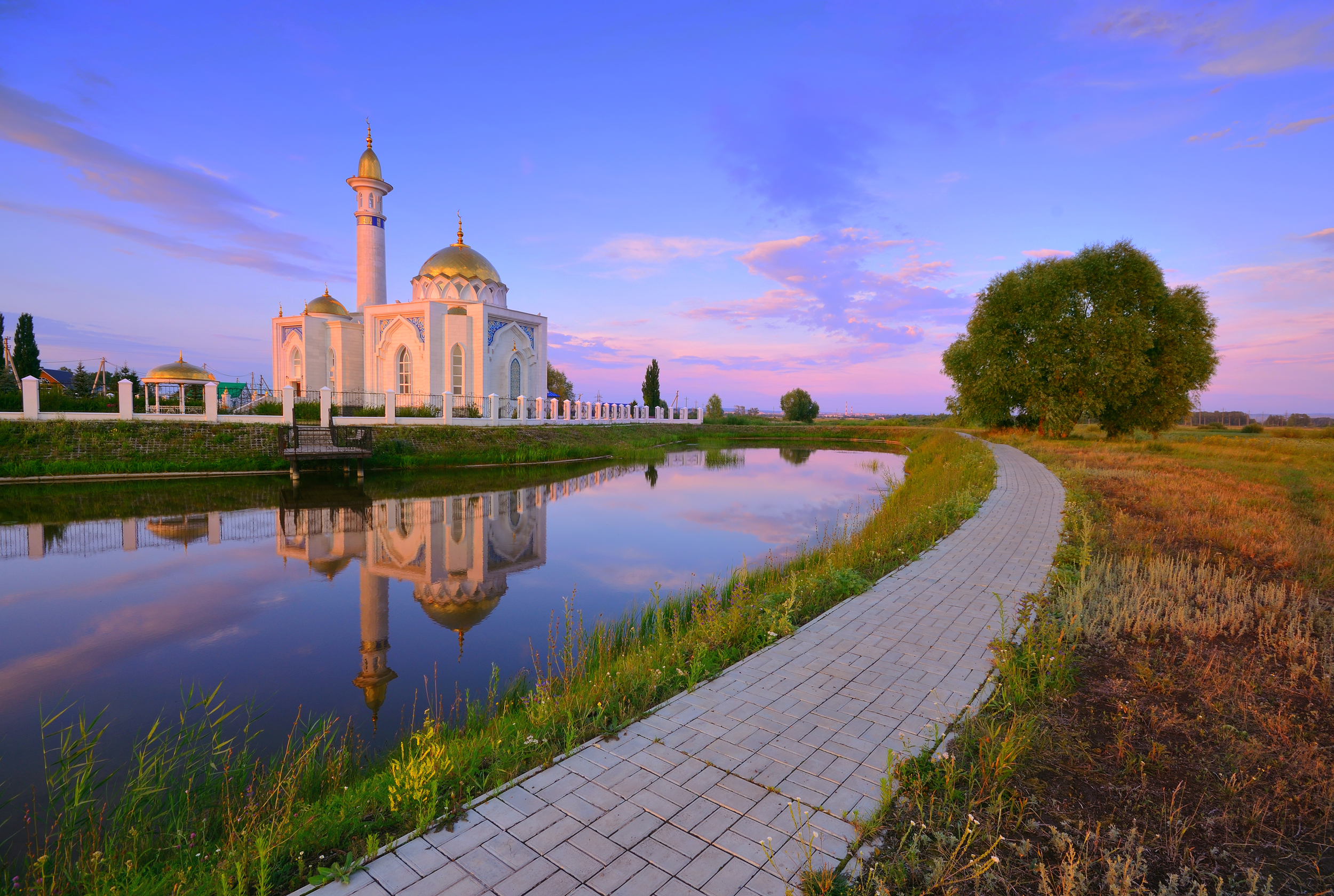
- Mosque "Sufi", Sterlitamaksky District

- Flag Coat of arms
- Location of Sterlitamaksky District in the Republic of Bashkortostan
- Coordinates: 53°38′N 55°57′E
- Country: Russia
- Federal subject: Republic of Bashkortostan
- Established: August 20, 1930
- Administrative center: Sterlitamak

Area
  - Total: 2,216 km^{2} (856 sq mi)

Population (2010 Census)
  - Total: 40,325
  - Estimate (2018): 42,979 (+6.6%)
  - Density: 18.20/km^{2} (47.13/sq mi)
  - Urban: 0%
  - Rural: 100%

Administrative structure
  - Administrative divisions: 20 Selsoviets
  - Inhabited localities: 111 rural localities

Municipal structure
  - Municipally incorporated as: Sterlitamaksky Municipal District
  - Municipal divisions: 0 urban settlements, 20 rural settlements
- Time zone: UTC+5 (MSK+2)
- OKTMO ID: 80649000
- Website: http://str-raion.ru

Population of Sterlitamaksky District
- 2010 Census: 40,325
- 2002 Census: 37,699
- 1989 Census: 33,461
- 1979 Census: 32,539

Sterlitamaksky District (Russian: Стерлитама́кский райо́н; Bashkir: Стәрлетамаҡ районы, Stärletamaq rayonı) is an administrative and municipal district (raion), one of the fifty-four in the Republic of Bashkortostan, Russia. It is located in the center of the republic and borders with Aurgazinsky District in the north, Gafuriysky District in the northeast, Ishimbaysky District in the east and southeast, Meleuzovsky District in the south, Sterlibashevsky District in the southwest, Miyakinsky District in the west, and with Alsheyevsky District in the west and northwest. The area of the district is 2,216 square kilometers (856 sq mi). Its administrative center is the city of Sterlitamak (which is not administratively a part of the district). As of the 2010 Census, the total population of the district was 40,325.

== History ==
The district was established on August 20, 1930.

== Administrative and municipal status ==
Within the framework of administrative divisions, Sterlitamaksky District is one of the fifty-four in the republic. It is divided into 20 selsoviets, comprising 111 rural localities. The city of Sterlitamak serves as its administrative center, despite being incorporated separately as a city of republic significance—an administrative unit with the status equal to that of the districts.

As a municipal division, the district is incorporated as Sterlitamaksky Municipal District. Its twenty selsoviets are incorporated as twenty rural settlements within the municipal district. The city of republic significance of Sterlitamak is incorporated separately from the district as Sterlitamak Urban Okrug, but serves as the administrative center of the municipal district as well.
