= Alexeyevka, Russia =

Alexeyevka (Russian: Алексе́евка) is the name of several inhabited localities in Russia.

== Altai Krai ==
As of 2010, six rural localities in Altai Krai bear this name:

- Alexeyevka, Blagoveshchensky District, Altai Krai, a selo in Alexeyevsky Selsoviet of Blagoveshchensky District
- Alexeyevka, Alexeyevsky Selsoviet, Charyshsky District, Altai Krai, a selo in Alexeyevsky Selsoviet of Charyshsky District
- Alexeyevka, Tulatinsky Selsoviet, Charyshsky District, Altai Krai, a selo in Tulatinsky Selsoviet of Charyshsky District
- Alexeyevka, Khabarsky District, Altai Krai, a settlement in Utyansky Selsoviet of Khabarsky District
- Alexeyevka, Petropavlovsky District, Altai Krai, a selo in Alexeyevsky Selsoviet of Petropavlovsky District
- Alexeyevka, Uglovsky District, Altai Krai, a selo in Pavlovsky Selsoviet of Uglovsky District

== Amur Oblast ==
As of 2010, three rural localities in Amur Oblast bear this name:

- Alexeyevka, Bureysky District, Amur Oblast, a selo in Alexeyevsky Rural Settlement of Bureysky District
- Alexeyevka, Mazanovsky District, Amur Oblast, a selo in Sapronovsky Rural Settlement of Mazanovsky District
- Alexeyevka, Zeysky District, Amur Oblast, a selo in Nikolayevsky Rural Settlement of Zeysky District

== Astrakhan Oblast ==
As of 2010, two rural localities in Astrakhan Oblast bear this name:

- Alexeyevka, Kamyzyaksky District, Astrakhan Oblast, a selo in Samosdelsky Selsoviet of Kamyzyaksky District
- Alexeyevka, Volodarsky District, Astrakhan Oblast, a selo in Tsvetnovsky Selsoviet of Volodarsky District

== Republic of Bashkortostan ==
As of 2010, eleven rural localities in the Republic of Bashkortostan bear this name:

- Alexeyevka, Kumertau, Republic of Bashkortostan, a village in Podgorny Selsoviet of the city of republic significance of Kumertau
- Alexeyevka, Semenkinsky Selsoviet, Aurgazinsky District, Republic of Bashkortostan, a village in Semenkinsky Selsoviet of Aurgazinsky District
- Alexeyevka, Tolbazinsky Selsoviet, Aurgazinsky District, Republic of Bashkortostan, a village in Tolbazinsky Selsoviet of Aurgazinsky District
- Alexeyevka, Belebeyevsky District, Republic of Bashkortostan, a village in Rassvetovsky Selsoviet of Belebeyevsky District
- Alexeyevka, Aitovsky Selsoviet, Bizhbulyaksky District, Republic of Bashkortostan, a selo in Aitovsky Selsoviet of Bizhbulyaksky District
- Alexeyevka, Bizhbulyaksky Selsoviet, Bizhbulyaksky District, Republic of Bashkortostan, a village in Bizhbulyaksky Selsoviet of Bizhbulyaksky District
- Alexeyevka, Blagovarsky District, Republic of Bashkortostan, a village in Alexeyevsky Selsoviet of Blagovarsky District
- Alexeyevka, Karmaskalinsky District, Republic of Bashkortostan, a village in Karmaskalinsky Selsoviet of Karmaskalinsky District
- Alexeyevka, Miyakinsky District, Republic of Bashkortostan, a village in Kozhay-Semenovsky Selsoviet of Miyakinsky District
- Alexeyevka, Tuymazinsky District, Republic of Bashkortostan, a selo in Chukadybashevsky Selsoviet of Tuymazinsky District
- Alexeyevka, Ufimsky District, Republic of Bashkortostan, a village in Alexeyevsky Selsoviet of Ufimsky District

== Belgorod Oblast ==
As of 2010, four inhabited localities in Belgorod Oblast bear this name:

Urban localities

- Alexeyevka, Belgorod Oblast, a town; administratively incorporated as a town of oblast significance of the same name

Rural localities

- Alexeyevka, Korochansky District, Belgorod Oblast, a selo in Korochansky District
- Alexeyevka, Volokonovsky District, Belgorod Oblast, a settlement in Shidlovsky Rural Okrug of Volokonovsky District
- Alexeyevka, Yakovlevsky District, Belgorod Oblast, a selo in Yakovlevsky District

== Bryansk Oblast ==
As of 2010, two rural localities in Bryansk Oblast bear this name:

- Alexeyevka, Kletnyansky District, Bryansk Oblast, a village in Alexeyevsky Selsoviet of Kletnyansky District
- Alexeyevka, Navlinsky District, Bryansk Oblast, a village in Alexeyevsky Selsoviet of Navlinsky District

== Chelyabinsk Oblast ==
As of 2010, two rural localities in Chelyabinsk Oblast bear this name:

- Alexeyevka, Satkinsky District, Chelyabinsk Oblast, a village in Aylinsky Selsoviet of Satkinsky District
- Alexeyevka, Varnensky District, Chelyabinsk Oblast, a selo in Alexeyevsky Selsoviet of Varnensky District

== Chuvash Republic ==
As of 2010, one rural locality in the Chuvash Republic bears this name:

- Alexeyevka, Chuvash Republic, a village in Chebakovskoye Rural Settlement of Yadrinsky District

== Irkutsk Oblast ==
As of 2010, two rural localities in Irkutsk Oblast bear this name:

- Alexeyevka, Kachugsky District, Irkutsk Oblast, a village in Kachugsky District
- Alexeyevka, Kirensky District, Irkutsk Oblast, a village in Kirensky District

== Ivanovo Oblast ==
As of 2010, one rural locality in Ivanovo Oblast bears this name:

- Alexeyevka, Ivanovo Oblast, a village in Pestyakovsky District

== Jewish Autonomous Oblast ==
As of 2010, one rural locality in the Jewish Autonomous Oblast bears this name:

- Alexeyevka, Jewish Autonomous Oblast, a selo in Birobidzhansky District

== Kaliningrad Oblast ==
As of 2010, two rural localities in Kaliningrad Oblast bear this name:

- Alexeyevka, Krasnoznamensky District, Kaliningrad Oblast, a settlement in Alexeyevsky Rural Okrug of Krasnoznamensky District
- Alexeyevka, Zelenogradsky District, Kaliningrad Oblast, a settlement in Pereslavsky Rural Okrug of Zelenogradsky District

== Kaluga Oblast ==
As of 2010, four rural localities in Kaluga Oblast bear this name:

- Alexeyevka, Ferzikovsky District, Kaluga Oblast, a village in Ferzikovsky District
- Alexeyevka, Iznoskovsky District, Kaluga Oblast, a village in Iznoskovsky District
- Alexeyevka, Khvastovichsky District, Kaluga Oblast, a village in Khvastovichsky District
- Alexeyevka, Peremyshlsky District, Kaluga Oblast, a village in Peremyshlsky District

== Kemerovo Oblast ==
As of 2010, three rural localities in Kemerovo Oblast bear this name:

- Alexeyevka, Novokuznetsky District, Kemerovo Oblast, a settlement in Kostenkovskaya Rural Territory of Novokuznetsky District
- Alexeyevka, Prokopyevsky District, Kemerovo Oblast, a village in Mikhaylovskaya Rural Territory of Prokopyevsky District
- Alexeyevka, Tyazhinsky District, Kemerovo Oblast, a village in Novopokrovskaya Rural Territory of Tyazhinsky District

== Khabarovsk Krai ==
As of 2010, one rural locality in Khabarovsk Krai bears this name:

- Alexeyevka, Khabarovsk Krai, a selo in Nikolayevsky District

== Komi Republic ==
As of 2010, one rural locality in the Komi Republic bears this name:

- Alexeyevka, Komi Republic, a village in Nivshera Selo Administrative Territory of Kortkerossky District

== Krasnoyarsk Krai ==
As of 2010, eight rural localities in Krasnoyarsk Krai bear this name:

- Alexeyevka, Abansky District, Krasnoyarsk Krai, a village in Nikolsky Selsoviet of Abansky District
- Alexeyevka, Karatuzsky District, Krasnoyarsk Krai, a village in Verkhnekuzhebarsky Selsoviet of Karatuzsky District
- Alexeyevka, Kuraginsky District, Krasnoyarsk Krai, a selo in Alexeyevsky Selsoviet of Kuraginsky District
- Alexeyevka, Nizhneingashsky District, Krasnoyarsk Krai, a village in Alexandrovsky Selsoviet of Nizhneingashsky District
- Alexeyevka, Sayansky District, Krasnoyarsk Krai, a village in Malinovsky Selsoviet of Sayansky District
- Alexeyevka, Tyukhtetsky District, Krasnoyarsk Krai, a village in Novomitropolsky Selsoviet of Tyukhtetsky District
- Alexeyevka, Uzhursky District, Krasnoyarsk Krai, a village in Krutoyarsky Selsoviet of Uzhursky District
- Alexeyevka, Yemelyanovsky District, Krasnoyarsk Krai, a village in Mikhaylovsky Selsoviet of Yemelyanovsky District

== Kursk Oblast ==
As of 2010, six rural localities in Kursk Oblast bear this name:

- Alexeyevka, Cheremisinovsky District, Kursk Oblast, a village in Stakanovsky Selsoviet of Cheremisinovsky District
- Alexeyevka, Glushkovsky District, Kursk Oblast, a selo in Alexeyevsky Selsoviet of Glushkovsky District
- Alexeyevka, Alexeyevsky Selsoviet, Kastorensky District, Kursk Oblast, a selo in Alexeyevsky Selsoviet of Kastorensky District
- Alexeyevka, Krasnodolinsky Selsoviet, Kastorensky District, Kursk Oblast, a village in Krasnodolinsky Selsoviet of Kastorensky District
- Alexeyevka, Solntsevsky District, Kursk Oblast, a village in Maksimovsky Selsoviet of Solntsevsky District

== Leningrad Oblast ==
As of 2010, four rural localities in Leningrad Oblast bear this name:

- Alexeyevka, Gatchinsky District, Leningrad Oblast, a village in Yelizavetinskoye Settlement Municipal Formation of Gatchinsky District
- Alexeyevka, Kingiseppsky District, Leningrad Oblast, a logging depot settlement in Opolyevskoye Settlement Municipal Formation of Kingiseppsky District
- Alexeyevka, Kirovsky District, Leningrad Oblast, a village in Putilovskoye Settlement Municipal Formation of Kirovsky District
- Alexeyevka, Luzhsky District, Leningrad Oblast, a village in Serebryanskoye Settlement Municipal Formation of Luzhsky District

== Lipetsk Oblast ==
As of 2010, eleven rural localities in Lipetsk Oblast bear this name:

- Alexeyevka, Dankovsky District, Lipetsk Oblast, a village in Voskresensky Selsoviet of Dankovsky District
- Alexeyevka, Kaverinsky Selsoviet, Dobrinsky District, Lipetsk Oblast, a village in Kaverinsky Selsoviet of Dobrinsky District
- Alexeyevka, Tikhvinsky Selsoviet, Dobrinsky District, Lipetsk Oblast, a village in Tikhvinsky Selsoviet of Dobrinsky District
- Alexeyevka, Lipetsky District, Lipetsk Oblast, a selo in Vasilyevsky Selsoviet of Lipetsky District
- Alexeyevka, Mikhaylovsky Selsoviet, Stanovlyansky District, Lipetsk Oblast, a village in Mikhaylovsky Selsoviet of Stanovlyansky District
- Alexeyevka, Palna-Mikhaylovsky Selsoviet, Stanovlyansky District, Lipetsk Oblast, a village in Palna-Mikhaylovsky Selsoviet of Stanovlyansky District
- Alexeyevka, Volovsky District, Lipetsk Oblast, a village in Zakharovsky Selsoviet of Volovsky District
- Alexeyevka, Yeletsky District, Lipetsk Oblast, a village in Kolosovsky Selsoviet of Yeletsky District
- Alexeyevka, Kamensky Selsoviet, Zadonsky District, Lipetsk Oblast, a village in Kamensky Selsoviet of Zadonsky District
- Alexeyevka, Kamyshevsky Selsoviet, Zadonsky District, Lipetsk Oblast, a village in Kamyshevsky Selsoviet of Zadonsky District
- Alexeyevka, Olshansky Selsoviet, Zadonsky District, Lipetsk Oblast, a village in Olshansky Selsoviet of Zadonsky District

== Mari El Republic ==
As of 2010, one rural locality in the Mari El Republic bears this name:

- Alexeyevka, Mari El Republic, a village in Alexeyevsky Rural Okrug of Sovetsky District

== Republic of Mordovia ==
As of 2010, three rural localities in the Republic of Mordovia bear this name:

- Alexeyevka, Chamzinsky District, Republic of Mordovia, a settlement in Alexeyevsky Selsoviet of Chamzinsky District
- Alexeyevka, Temnikovsky District, Republic of Mordovia, a village in Alexeyevsky Selsoviet of Temnikovsky District
- Alexeyevka, Yelnikovsky District, Republic of Mordovia, a village in Nadezhdinsky Selsoviet of Yelnikovsky District

== Moscow Oblast ==
As of 2010, five rural localities in Moscow Oblast bear this name:

- Alexeyevka, Chekhovsky District, Moscow Oblast, a village in Stremilovskoye Rural Settlement of Chekhovsky District
- Alexeyevka, Istrinsky District, Moscow Oblast, a village in Onufriyevskoye Rural Settlement of Istrinsky District
- Alexeyevka, Mozhaysky District, Moscow Oblast, a village in Yurlovskoye Rural Settlement of Mozhaysky District
- Alexeyevka, Naro-Fominsky District, Moscow Oblast, a village under the administrative jurisdiction of the town of Naro-Fominsk in Naro-Fominsky District
- Alexeyevka, Noginsky District, Moscow Oblast, a village in Akseno-Butyrskoye Rural Settlement of Noginsky District

== Nizhny Novgorod Oblast ==
As of 2010, four rural localities in Nizhny Novgorod Oblast bear this name:

- Alexeyevka, Bogorodsky District, Nizhny Novgorod Oblast, a village in Khvoshchevsky Selsoviet of Bogorodsky District
- Alexeyevka, Bolsheboldinsky District, Nizhny Novgorod Oblast, a selo in Molchanovsky Selsoviet of Bolsheboldinsky District
- Alexeyevka, Pilninsky District, Nizhny Novgorod Oblast, a settlement in Bolsheandosovsky Selsoviet of Pilninsky District
- Alexeyevka, Pochinkovsky District, Nizhny Novgorod Oblast, a village in Naruksovsky Selsoviet of Pochinkovsky District

== Novosibirsk Oblast ==
As of 2010, six rural localities in Novosibirsk Oblast bear this name:

- Alexeyevka, Chulymsky District, Novosibirsk Oblast, a settlement in Chulymsky District
- Alexeyevka, Kupinsky District, Novosibirsk Oblast, a village in Kupinsky District
- Alexeyevka, Kyshtovsky District, Novosibirsk Oblast, a village in Kyshtovsky District
- Alexeyevka, Novosibirsky District, Novosibirsk Oblast, a village in Novosibirsky District
- Alexeyevka, Severny District, Novosibirsk Oblast, a village in Severny District
- Alexeyevka, Zdvinsky District, Novosibirsk Oblast, a selo in Zdvinsky District

== Omsk Oblast ==
As of 2010, eleven rural localities in Omsk Oblast bear this name:

- Alexeyevka, Gorkovsky District, Omsk Oblast, a village in Alexeyevsky Rural Okrug of Gorkovsky District
- Alexeyevka, Kormilovsky District, Omsk Oblast, a selo in Alexeyevsky Rural Okrug of Kormilovsky District
- Alexeyevka, Lyubinsky District, Omsk Oblast, a selo in Alexeyevsky Rural Okrug of Lyubinsky District
- Alexeyevka, Maryanovsky District, Omsk Oblast, a village in Vasilyevsky Rural Okrug of Maryanovsky District
- Alexeyevka, Moskalensky District, Omsk Oblast, a selo in Alexeyevsky Rural Okrug of Moskalensky District
- Alexeyevka, Porechensky Rural Okrug, Muromtsevsky District, Omsk Oblast, a village in Porechensky Rural Okrug of Muromtsevsky District
- Alexeyevka, Ryazansky Rural Okrug, Muromtsevsky District, Omsk Oblast, a village in Ryazansky Rural Okrug of Muromtsevsky District
- Alexeyevka, Okoneshnikovsky District, Omsk Oblast, a village in Chistovsky Rural Okrug of Okoneshnikovsky District
- Alexeyevka, Omsky District, Omsk Oblast, a village in Pokrovsky Rural Okrug of Omsky District
- Alexeyevka, Sargatsky District, Omsk Oblast, a village in Novotroitsky Rural Okrug of Sargatsky District
- Alexeyevka, Sedelnikovsky District, Omsk Oblast, a village in Ragozinsky Rural Okrug of Sedelnikovsky District

== Orenburg Oblast ==
As of 2010, nine rural localities in Orenburg Oblast bear this name:

- Alexeyevka, Abdulinsky District, Orenburg Oblast, a settlement in Pokrovsky Selsoviet of Abdulinsky District
- Alexeyevka, Asekeyevsky District, Orenburg Oblast, a selo in Alexeyevsky Selsoviet of Asekeyevsky District
- Alexeyevka, Buguruslansky District, Orenburg Oblast, a selo in Aksakovsky Selsoviet of Buguruslansky District
- Alexeyevka, Buzuluksky District, Orenburg Oblast, a settlement in Yelkhovsky Selsoviet of Buzuluksky District
- Alexeyevka, Kvarkensky District, Orenburg Oblast, a selo in Urtazymsky Selsoviet of Kvarkensky District
- Alexeyevka, Perevolotsky District, Orenburg Oblast, a selo in Sadovy Selsoviet of Perevolotsky District
- Alexeyevka, Ponomaryovsky District, Orenburg Oblast, a selo in Alexeyevsky Selsoviet of Ponomaryovsky District
- Alexeyevka, Sorochinsky District, Orenburg Oblast, a selo in Matveyevsky Selsoviet of Sorochinsky District
- Alexeyevka, Tashlinsky District, Orenburg Oblast, a selo in Alexeyevsky Selsoviet of Tashlinsky District

== Oryol Oblast ==
As of 2010, ten rural localities in Oryol Oblast bear this name:

- Alexeyevka, Bolkhovsky District, Oryol Oblast, a village in Novosinetsky Selsoviet of Bolkhovsky District
- Alexeyevka, Dolzhansky District, Oryol Oblast, a selo in Uspensky Selsoviet of Dolzhansky District
- Alexeyevka, Khotynetsky District, Oryol Oblast, a village in Melovskoy Selsoviet of Khotynetsky District
- Alexeyevka, Kromskoy District, Oryol Oblast, a village in Gutorovsky Selsoviet of Kromskoy District
- Alexeyevka, Pokrovsky District, Oryol Oblast, a selo in Stolbetsky Selsoviet of Pokrovsky District
- Alexeyevka, Uritsky District, Oryol Oblast, a village in Gorodishchensky Selsoviet of Uritsky District
- Alexeyevka, Galichinsky Selsoviet, Verkhovsky District, Oryol Oblast, a village in Galichinsky Selsoviet of Verkhovsky District
- Alexeyevka, Konshinsky Selsoviet, Verkhovsky District, Oryol Oblast, a village in Konshinsky Selsoviet of Verkhovsky District
- Alexeyevka, Prilepsky Selsoviet, Zalegoshchensky District, Oryol Oblast, a village in Prilepsky Selsoviet of Zalegoshchensky District
- Alexeyevka, Verkhneskvorchensky Selsoviet, Zalegoshchensky District, Oryol Oblast, a village in Verkhneskvorchensky Selsoviet of Zalegoshchensky District

== Penza Oblast ==
As of 2010, ten rural localities in Penza Oblast bear this name:

- Alexeyevka, Bashmakovsky District, Penza Oblast, a selo in Alexeyevsky Selsoviet of Bashmakovsky District
- Alexeyevka, Lermontovsky Selsoviet, Belinsky District, Penza Oblast, a selo in Lermontovsky Selsoviet of Belinsky District
- Alexeyevka, Poimsky Selsoviet, Belinsky District, Penza Oblast, a selo in Poimsky Selsoviet of Belinsky District
- Alexeyevka, Gorodishchensky District, Penza Oblast, a village in Turdaksky Selsoviet of Gorodishchensky District
- Alexeyevka, Kameshkirsky District, Penza Oblast, a selo in Lapshovsky Selsoviet of Kameshkirsky District
- Alexeyevka, Kuznetsky District, Penza Oblast, a selo in Yasnopolyansky Selsoviet of Kuznetsky District
- Alexeyevka, Mokshansky District, Penza Oblast, a selo in Chernozersky Selsoviet of Mokshansky District
- Alexeyevka, Pachelmsky District, Penza Oblast, a selo in Sheynsky Selsoviet of Pachelmsky District
- Alexeyevka, Tamalinsky District, Penza Oblast, a village in Ulyanovsky Selsoviet of Tamalinsky District
- Alexeyevka, Vadinsky District, Penza Oblast, a village in Tataro-Lakinsky Selsoviet of Vadinsky District

== Perm Krai ==
As of 2010, one rural locality in Perm Krai bears this name:

- Alexeyevka, Perm Krai, a village in Kudymkarsky District

== Primorsky Krai ==
As of 2010, two rural localities in Primorsky Krai bear this name:

- Alexeyevka, Khankaysky District, Primorsky Krai, a selo in Khankaysky District
- Alexeyevka, Nadezhdinsky District, Primorsky Krai, a settlement in Nadezhdinsky District

== Pskov Oblast ==
As of 2010, three rural localities in Pskov Oblast bear this name:

- Alexeyevka, Ostrovsky District, Pskov Oblast, a village in Ostrovsky District
- Alexeyevka, Strugo-Krasnensky District, Pskov Oblast, a village in Strugo-Krasnensky District
- Alexeyevka, Usvyatsky District, Pskov Oblast, a village in Usvyatsky District

== Rostov Oblast ==
As of 2010, two rural localities in Rostov Oblast bear this name:

- Alexeyevka, Matveyevo-Kurgansky District, Rostov Oblast, a selo in Alexeyevskoye Rural Settlement of Matveyevo-Kurgansky District
- Alexeyevka, Oktyabrsky District, Rostov Oblast, a selo in Alexeyevskoye Rural Settlement of Oktyabrsky District

== Ryazan Oblast ==
As of 2010, three rural localities in Ryazan Oblast bear this name:

- Alexeyevka, Korablinsky District, Ryazan Oblast, a village in Nikitinsky Rural Okrug of Korablinsky District
- Alexeyevka, Ryazhsky District, Ryazan Oblast, a village in Ratmanovsky Rural Okrug of Ryazhsky District
- Alexeyevka, Sarayevsky District, Ryazan Oblast, a selo in Alexeyevsky Rural Okrug of Sarayevsky District

== Sakha Republic ==
As of 2010, one rural locality in the Sakha Republic bears this name:

- Alexeyevka, Sakha Republic, a selo in Sanyyakhtakhsky Rural Okrug of Olyokminsky District

== Samara Oblast ==
As of 2010, four inhabited localities in Samara Oblast bear this name:

- Alexeyevka, Kinel, Samara Oblast, an urban-type settlement under the administrative jurisdiction of the town of oblast significance of Kinel
- Alexeyevka, Alexeyevsky District, Samara Oblast, a selo in Alexeyevsky District
- Alexeyevka, Borsky District, Samara Oblast, a selo in Borsky District
- Alexeyevka, Koshkinsky District, Samara Oblast, a settlement in Koshkinsky District

== Saratov Oblast ==
As of 2010, seven rural localities in Saratov Oblast bear this name:

- Alexeyevka, Arkadaksky District, Saratov Oblast, a selo in Arkadaksky District
- Alexeyevka, Atkarsky District, Saratov Oblast, a village in Atkarsky District
- Alexeyevka, Bazarno-Karabulaksky District, Saratov Oblast, a selo in Bazarno-Karabulaksky District
- Alexeyevka, Kalininsky District, Saratov Oblast, a village in Kalininsky District
- Alexeyevka, Khvalynsky District, Saratov Oblast, a settlement in Khvalynsky District
- Alexeyevka, Novouzensky District, Saratov Oblast, a settlement in Novouzensky District
- Alexeyevka, Perelyubsky District, Saratov Oblast, a selo in Perelyubsky District

== Smolensk Oblast ==
As of 2010, three rural localities in Smolensk Oblast bear this name:

- Alexeyevka, Gagarinsky District, Smolensk Oblast, a village in Nikolskoye Rural Settlement of Gagarinsky District
- Alexeyevka, Smolensky District, Smolensk Oblast, a village in Katynskoye Rural Settlement of Smolensky District
- Alexeyevka, Ugransky District, Smolensk Oblast, a village in Zhelanyinskoye Rural Settlement of Ugransky District

== Tambov Oblast ==
As of 2010, seven rural localities in Tambov Oblast bear this name:

- Alexeyevka, Gavrilovsky District, Tambov Oblast, a settlement in Chupovsky Selsoviet of Gavrilovsky District
- Alexeyevka, Inzhavinsky District, Tambov Oblast, a village in Nikitinsky Selsoviet of Inzhavinsky District
- Alexeyevka, Morshansky District, Tambov Oblast, a village in Yekaterinovsky Selsoviet of Morshansky District
- Alexeyevka, Petrovsky District, Tambov Oblast, a village in Pervomaysky Selsoviet of Petrovsky District
- Alexeyevka, Rasskazovsky District, Tambov Oblast, a village in Lipovsky Selsoviet of Rasskazovsky District
- Alexeyevka, Zherdevsky District, Tambov Oblast, a selo in Alexeyevsky Selsoviet of Zherdevsky District
- Alexeyevka, Znamensky District, Tambov Oblast, a village in Pokrovo-Marfinsky Selsoviet of Znamensky District

== Republic of Tatarstan ==
As of 2010, three rural localities in the Republic of Tatarstan bear this name:

- Alexeyevka, Aksubayevsky District, Republic of Tatarstan, a village in Aksubayevsky District
- Alexeyevka, Bavlinsky District, Republic of Tatarstan, a selo in Bavlinsky District
- Alexeyevka, Zainsky District, Republic of Tatarstan, a selo in Zainsky District

== Tomsk Oblast ==
As of 2010, one rural locality in Tomsk Oblast bears this name:

- Alexeyevka, Tomsk Oblast, a village in Molchanovsky District

== Tula Oblast ==
As of 2010, twelve rural localities in Tula Oblast bear this name:

- Alexeyevka, Belyovsky District, Tula Oblast, a village in Kurakovsky Rural Okrug of Belyovsky District
- Alexeyevka, Bogoroditsky District, Tula Oblast, a village in Korsakovsky Rural Okrug of Bogoroditsky District
- Alexeyevka, Kamensky District, Tula Oblast, a village in Galitsky Rural Okrug of Kamensky District
- Alexeyevka, Buchalsky Rural Okrug, Kimovsky District, Tula Oblast, a village in Buchalsky Rural Okrug of Kimovsky District
- Alexeyevka, Zubovsky Rural Okrug, Kimovsky District, Tula Oblast, a village in Zubovsky Rural Okrug of Kimovsky District
- Alexeyevka, Krestovskaya Volost, Kurkinsky District, Tula Oblast, a village in Krestovskaya Volost of Kurkinsky District
- Alexeyevka, Samarskaya Volost, Kurkinsky District, Tula Oblast, a village in Samarskaya Volost of Kurkinsky District
- Alexeyevka, Leninsky District, Tula Oblast, a village in Fedorovsky Rural Okrug of Leninsky District
- Alexeyevka, Lidinsky Rural Okrug, Tyoplo-Ogaryovsky District, Tula Oblast, a village in Lidinsky Rural Okrug of Tyoplo-Ogaryovsky District
- Alexeyevka, Naryshkinsky Rural Okrug, Tyoplo-Ogaryovsky District, Tula Oblast, a village in Naryshkinsky Rural Okrug of Tyoplo-Ogaryovsky District
- Alexeyevka, Volovsky District, Tula Oblast, a village in Nikitsky Rural Okrug of Volovsky District
- Alexeyevka, Yefremovsky District, Tula Oblast, a village in Mechnyansky Rural Okrug of Yefremovsky District

== Tyumen Oblast ==
As of 2010, one rural locality in Tyumen Oblast bears this name:

- Alexeyevka, Tyumen Oblast, a village in Borovlyansky Rural Okrug of Golyshmanovsky District

== Ulyanovsk Oblast ==
As of 2010, one rural locality in Ulyanovsk Oblast bears this name:

- Alexeyevka, Ulyanovsk Oblast, a selo in Yedelevsky Rural Okrug of Kuzovatovsky District

== Vladimir Oblast ==
As of 2010, one rural locality in Vladimir Oblast bears this name:

- Alexeyevka, Vladimir Oblast, a village in Kovrovsky District

== Voronezh Oblast ==
As of 2010, three rural localities in Voronezh Oblast bear this name:

- Alexeyevka, Gribanovsky District, Voronezh Oblast, a selo in Alexeyevskoye Rural Settlement of Gribanovsky District
- Alexeyevka, Krasnonovskoye Rural Settlement, Paninsky District, Voronezh Oblast, a settlement in Krasnonovskoye Rural Settlement of Paninsky District
- Alexeyevka, Pereleshinskoye Urban Settlement, Paninsky District, Voronezh Oblast, a settlement under the administrative jurisdiction of Pereleshinskoye Urban Settlement of Paninsky District

== Yaroslavl Oblast ==
As of 2010, one rural locality in Yaroslavl Oblast bears this name:

- Alexeyevka, Yaroslavl Oblast, a village in Kirillovsky Rural Okrug of Lyubimsky District

== See also ==
- Alexeyevsky (inhabited locality)
