= Alexeyevsky (inhabited locality) =

Alexeyevsky (Russian: Алексе́евский; masculine), Alexeyevskaya (Алексе́евская; feminine), or Alexeyevskoye (Алексе́евское; neuter) is the name of several inhabited localities in Russia.

== Altai Krai ==
As of 2010, one rural locality in Altai Krai bears this name:

- Alexeyevsky, Altai Krai, a settlement in Velizhansky Selsoviet of Pankrushikhinsky District

== Arkhangelsk Oblast ==
As of 2010, twelve rural localities in Arkhangelsk Oblast bear this name:

- Alexeyevskaya, Konoshsky District, Arkhangelsk Oblast, a village in Yertsevsky Selsoviet of Konoshsky District
- Alexeyevskaya, Alekseyevsky Selsoviet, Krasnoborsky District, Arkhangelsk Oblast, a village in Alekseyevsky Selsoviet of Krasnoborsky District
- Alexeyevskaya, Belosludsky Selsoviet, Krasnoborsky District, Arkhangelsk Oblast, a village in Belosludsky Selsoviet of Krasnoborsky District
- Alexeyevskaya, Lyakhovsky Selsoviet, Krasnoborsky District, Arkhangelsk Oblast, a village in Lyakhovsky Selsoviet of Krasnoborsky District
- Alexeyevskaya, Nyandomsky District, Arkhangelsk Oblast, a village in Moshinsky Selsoviet of Nyandomsky District
- Alexeyevskaya, Plesetsky District, Arkhangelsk Oblast, a village in Tarasovsky Selsoviet of Plesetsky District
- Alexeyevskaya, Ustyansky District, Arkhangelsk Oblast, a village in Rostovsky Selsoviet of Ustyansky District
- Alexeyevskaya, Velsky District, Arkhangelsk Oblast, a village in Verkhneustkuloysky Selsoviet of Velsky District
- Alexeyevskaya, Afanasyevsky Selsoviet, Verkhnetoyemsky District, Arkhangelsk Oblast, a village in Afanasyevsky Selsoviet of Verkhnetoyemsky District
- Alexeyevskaya, Fedkovsky Selsoviet, Verkhnetoyemsky District, Arkhangelsk Oblast, a village in Fedkovsky Selsoviet of Verkhnetoyemsky District
- Alexeyevskaya, Verkhnetoyemsky Selsoviet, Verkhnetoyemsky District, Arkhangelsk Oblast, a village in Verkhnetoyemsky Selsoviet of Verkhnetoyemsky District
- Alexeyevskaya, Vinogradovsky District, Arkhangelsk Oblast, a village in Boretsky Selsoviet of Vinogradovsky District

== Republic of Bashkortostan ==
As of 2010, one rural locality in the Republic of Bashkortostan bears this name:

- Alexeyevskoye, Republic of Bashkortostan, a village in Inzersky Selsoviet of Arkhangelsky District

== Bryansk Oblast ==
As of 2010, three rural localities in Bryansk Oblast bear this name:

- Alexeyevsky, Mglinsky District, Bryansk Oblast, a khutor in Oskolkovsky Selsoviet of Mglinsky District
- Alexeyevsky, Surazhsky District, Bryansk Oblast, a settlement in Kulazhsky Selsoviet of Surazhsky District
- Alexeyevsky, Vygonichsky District, Bryansk Oblast, a settlement in Khmelevsky Selsoviet of Vygonichsky District

== Chelyabinsk Oblast ==
As of 2010, one rural locality in Chelyabinsk Oblast bears this name:

- Alexeyevsky, Chelyabinsk Oblast, a settlement in Magnitny Selsoviet of Agapovsky District

== Ivanovo Oblast ==
As of 2010, one rural locality in Ivanovo Oblast bears this name:

- Alexeyevskoye, Ivanovo Oblast, a selo in Ilyinsky District

== Kaluga Oblast ==
As of 2010, four rural localities in Kaluga Oblast bear this name:

- Alexeyevsky, Ferzikovsky District, Kaluga Oblast, a settlement in Ferzikovsky District
- Alexeyevsky, Lyudinovsky District, Kaluga Oblast, a village in Lyudinovsky District
- Alexeyevskoye, Peremyshlsky District, Kaluga Oblast, a village in Peremyshlsky District
- Alexeyevskoye, Yukhnovsky District, Kaluga Oblast, a village in Yukhnovsky District

== Kirov Oblast ==
As of 2010, one rural locality in Kirov Oblast bears this name:

- Alexeyevskoye, Kirov Oblast, a selo in Bezbozhnikovsky Rural Okrug of Murashinsky District

== Kostroma Oblast ==
As of 2010, two rural localities in Kostroma Oblast bear this name:

- Alexeyevskoye, Antropovsky District, Kostroma Oblast, a village in Kotelnikovskoye Settlement of Antropovsky District
- Alexeyevskoye, Neysky District, Kostroma Oblast, a village in Kotkishevskoye Settlement of Neysky District

== Krasnodar Krai ==
As of 2010, four rural localities in Krasnodar Krai bear this name:

- Alexeyevsky, Krasnodar Krai, a khutor in Sokolovsky Rural Okrug of Gulkevichsky District
- Alexeyevskoye, Sochi, Krasnodar Krai, a selo in Kirovsky Rural Okrug of the city of Sochi
- Alexeyevskoye, Kushchyovsky District, Krasnodar Krai, a selo in Razdolnensky Rural Okrug of Kushchyovsky District
- Alexeyevskaya, Krasnodar Krai, a stanitsa in Alekseyevsky Rural Okrug of Tikhoretsky District

== Kursk Oblast ==
As of 2010, two rural localities in Kursk Oblast bear this name:

- Alexeyevsky, Korenevsky District, Kursk Oblast, a khutor in Plodosovkhozsky Selsoviet of Korenevsky District
- Alexeyevsky, Zheleznogorsky District, Kursk Oblast, a settlement in Ryshkovsky Selsoviet of Zheleznogorsky District

== Leningrad Oblast ==
As of 2010, one rural locality in Leningrad Oblast bears this name:

- Alexeyevskaya, Leningrad Oblast, a village in Vinnitskoye Settlement Municipal Formation of Podporozhsky District

== Lipetsk Oblast ==
As of 2010, one rural locality in Lipetsk Oblast bears this name:

- Alexeyevsky, Lipetsk Oblast, a settlement in Voskresensky Selsoviet of Dankovsky District

== Mari El Republic ==
As of 2010, three rural localities in the Mari El Republic bear this name:

- Alexeyevsky, Mari El Republic, a settlement in Alekseyevsky Rural Okrug of Sovetsky District
- Alexeyevskoye, Mari-Tureksky District, Mari El Republic, a selo under the administrative jurisdiction of the urban-type settlement of Mari-Turek, Mari-Tureksky District
- Alexeyevskoye, Volzhsky District, Mari El Republic, a selo in Emekovsky Rural Okrug of Volzhsky District

== Moscow Oblast ==
As of 2010, two rural localities in Moscow Oblast bear this name:

- Alexeyevskoye, Moscow Oblast, a village in Sokolovskoye Rural Settlement of Solnechnogorsky District
- Alexeyevskaya, Moscow Oblast, a village in Sobolevskoye Rural Settlement of Orekhovo-Zuyevsky District

== Nizhny Novgorod Oblast ==
As of 2010, one rural locality in Nizhny Novgorod Oblast bears this name:

- Alexeyevsky, Nizhny Novgorod Oblast, a settlement in Chugunovsky Selsoviet of Vorotynsky District

== Novosibirsk Oblast ==
As of 2010, one rural locality in Novosibirsk Oblast bears this name:

- Alexeyevsky, Novosibirsk Oblast, a settlement in Iskitimsky District

== Omsk Oblast ==
As of 2010, two rural localities in Omsk Oblast bear this name:

- Alexeyevsky, Gorkovsky District, Omsk Oblast, a settlement in Alekseyevsky Rural Okrug of Gorkovsky District
- Alexeyevsky, Lyubinsky District, Omsk Oblast, a settlement in Alekseyevsky Rural Okrug of Lyubinsky District

== Oryol Oblast ==
As of 2010, five rural localities in Oryol Oblast bear this name:

- Alexeyevsky, Gnezdilovsky Selsoviet, Bolkhovsky District, Oryol Oblast, a settlement in Gnezdilovsky Selsoviet of Bolkhovsky District
- Alexeyevsky, Novosinetsky Selsoviet, Bolkhovsky District, Oryol Oblast, a settlement in Novosinetsky Selsoviet of Bolkhovsky District
- Alexeyevsky, Berezovsky Selsoviet, Dmitrovsky District, Oryol Oblast, a settlement in Berezovsky Selsoviet of Dmitrovsky District
- Alexeyevsky, Malobobrovsky Selsoviet, Dmitrovsky District, Oryol Oblast, a settlement in Malobobrovsky Selsoviet of Dmitrovsky District
- Alexeyevsky, Shablykinsky District, Oryol Oblast, a settlement in Navlinsky Selsoviet of Shablykinsky District

== Pskov Oblast ==
As of 2010, one rural locality in Pskov Oblast bears this name:

- Alexeyevskoye, Pskov Oblast, a village in Loknyansky District

== Rostov Oblast ==
As of 2010, two rural localities in Rostov Oblast bear this name:

- Alexeyevsky, Oblivsky District, Rostov Oblast, a khutor in Alekseyevskoye Rural Settlement of Oblivsky District
- Alexeyevsky, Verkhnedonskoy District, Rostov Oblast, a khutor in Meshkovskoye Rural Settlement of Verkhnedonskoy District

== Samara Oblast ==
As of 2010, two rural localities in Samara Oblast bear this name:

- Alexeyevsky, Bolshechernigovsky District, Samara Oblast, a settlement in Bolshechernigovsky District
- Alexeyevsky, Krasnoarmeysky District, Samara Oblast, a settlement in Krasnoarmeysky District

== Saratov Oblast ==
As of 2010, three rural localities in Saratov Oblast bear this name:

- Alexeyevsky, Kalininsky District, Saratov Oblast, a settlement in Kalininsky District
- Alexeyevsky, Romanovsky District, Saratov Oblast, a settlement in Romanovsky District
- Alexeyevsky, Samoylovsky District, Saratov Oblast, a settlement in Samoylovsky District

== Stavropol Krai ==
As of 2010, two rural localities in Stavropol Krai bear this name:

- Alexeyevskoye, Andropovsky District, Stavropol Krai, a selo in Krasnoyarsky Selsoviet of Andropovsky District
- Alexeyevskoye, Blagodarnensky District, Stavropol Krai, a selo in Blagodarnensky District

== Republic of Tatarstan ==
As of 2010, two inhabited localities in the Republic of Tatarstan bear this name.

Urban localities

- Alexeyevskoye, Republic of Tatarstan, an urban-type settlement in Alexeyevsky District

Rural localities

- Alexeyevsky, Republic of Tatarstan, a settlement in Laishevsky District

== Tula Oblast ==
As of 2010, one rural locality in Tula Oblast bears this name:

- Alexeyevsky, Tula Oblast, a settlement in Nikitsky Rural Okrug of Volovsky District

== Tver Oblast ==
As of 2010, nine rural localities in Tver Oblast bear this name:

- Alexeyevskoye, Andreapolsky District, Tver Oblast, a village in Andreapolsky District
- Alexeyevskoye, Bezhetsky District, Tver Oblast, a village in Bezhetsky District
- Alexeyevskoye, Kalininsky District, Tver Oblast, a village in Kalininsky District
- Alexeyevskoye, Kalininsky District, Tver Oblast, a village in Kalininsky District
- Alexeyevskoye, Kashinsky District, Tver Oblast, a village in Kashinsky District
- Alexeyevskoye, Ostashkovsky District, Tver Oblast, a village in Ostashkovsky District
- Alexeyevskoye, Rameshkovsky District, Tver Oblast, a village in Rameshkovsky District
- Alexeyevskoye, Selizharovsky District, Tver Oblast, a village in Selizharovsky District
- Alexeyevskoye, Vyshnevolotsky District, Tver Oblast, a selo in Vyshnevolotsky District

== Udmurt Republic ==
As of 2010, one rural locality in the Udmurt Republic bears this name:

- Alexeyevsky, Udmurt Republic, a vyselok in Gulekovsky Selsoviet of Glazovsky District

== Vladimir Oblast ==
As of 2010, one rural locality in Vladimir Oblast bears this name:

- Alexeyevskoye, Vladimir Oblast, a selo in Kovrovsky District

== Volgograd Oblast ==
As of 2010, one rural locality in Volgograd Oblast bears this name:

- Alexeyevskaya, Volgograd Oblast, a stanitsa in Alekseyevsky Selsoviet of Alexeyevsky District

== Vologda Oblast ==
As of 2010, seven rural localities in Vologda Oblast bear this name:

- Alexeyevskoye, Chagodoshchensky District, Vologda Oblast, a village in Belokrestsky Selsoviet of Chagodoshchensky District
- Alexeyevskoye, Vologodsky District, Vologda Oblast, a village in Novlensky Selsoviet of Vologodsky District
- Alexeyevskoye, Vytegorsky District, Vologda Oblast, a settlement in Devyatinsky Selsoviet of Vytegorsky District
- Alexeyevskaya, Babayevsky District, Vologda Oblast, a village in Pyazhozersky Selsoviet of Babayevsky District
- Alexeyevskaya, Kirillovsky District, Vologda Oblast, a village in Lipovsky Selsoviet of Kirillovsky District
- Alexeyevskaya, Syamzhensky District, Vologda Oblast, a village in Zhityevsky Selsoviet of Syamzhensky District
- Alexeyevskaya, Velikoustyugsky District, Vologda Oblast, a village in Viktorovsky Selsoviet of Velikoustyugsky District

== Voronezh Oblast ==
As of 2010, two rural localities in Voronezh Oblast bear this name:

- Alexeyevsky, Buturlinovsky District, Voronezh Oblast, a settlement in Karaychevskoye Rural Settlement of Buturlinovsky District
- Alexeyevsky, Novokhopyorsky District, Voronezh Oblast, a settlement in Kolenovskoye Rural Settlement of Novokhopyorsky District

== Yaroslavl Oblast ==
As of 2010, six rural localities in Yaroslavl Oblast bear this name:

- Alexeyevskoye, Danilovsky District, Yaroslavl Oblast, a village in Semivragovsky Rural Okrug of Danilovsky District
- Alexeyevskoye, Nekrasovsky District, Yaroslavl Oblast, a village in Grebovsky Rural Okrug of Nekrasovsky District
- Alexeyevskoye, Nazarovsky Rural Okrug, Rybinsky District, Yaroslavl Oblast, a village in Nazarovsky Rural Okrug of Rybinsky District
- Alexeyevskoye, Shashkovsky Rural Okrug, Rybinsky District, Yaroslavl Oblast, a village in Shashkovsky Rural Okrug of Rybinsky District
- Alexeyevskoye, Lyutovsky Rural Okrug, Yaroslavsky District, Yaroslavl Oblast, a village in Lyutovsky Rural Okrug of Yaroslavsky District
- Alexeyevskoye, Teleginsky Rural Okrug, Yaroslavsky District, Yaroslavl Oblast, a village in Teleginsky Rural Okrug of Yaroslavsky District

== See also ==
- Alexey
- Alexeyevka, Russia
