= Khlebodarovka =

Khlebodarovka Хлебодаровка
- Village
- Location within Bashkortostan Location within Russia
- Coordinates: 54°44′N 55°00′E
- Country: Russia
- Region: Bashkortostan
- District: Blagovarsky District
- Time zone: UTC+5:00

Khlebodarovka (Russian: Хлебодаровка) is a rural locality (a village) in Yazykovsky Selsoviet, Blagovarsky District, Bashkortostan, Russia. The population was 51 as of 2010. There is 1 street.

== Geography ==
Khlebodarovka is located 8 km north of Yazykovo (the district's administrative centre) by road. Starogornovo is the nearest rural locality.
