= Moiseyevo =

Moiseyevo Моисеево
- Selo
- Location within Bashkortostan Location within Russia
- Coordinates: 54°49′N 55°11′E
- Country: Russia
- Region: Bashkortostan
- District: Blagovarsky District
- Time zone: UTC+5:00

Moiseyevo (Russian: Моисеево) is a rural locality (a selo) in Alexeyevsky Selsoviet, Blagovarsky District, Bashkortostan, Russia. The population was 7 as of 2010. There is 1 street.

== Geography ==
Moiseyevo is located 29 km southeast of Yazykovo (the district's administrative centre) by road. Novonikolskoye is the nearest rural locality.
