= Tabuldak =

Tabuldak Табулдак
- Village
- Location within Bashkortostan Location within Russia
- Coordinates: 54°44′N 55°06′E
- Country: Russia
- Region: Bashkortostan
- District: Blagovarsky District
- Time zone: UTC+5:00

Tabuldak (Russian: Табулдак; Bashkir: Тубылғаҡ, Tubılğaq) is a rural locality (a village) in Kashkalashinsky Selsoviet, Blagovarsky District, Bashkortostan, Russia. The population was 12 as of 2010. There are 2 streets.

== Geography ==
Tabuldak is located 14 km northeast of Yazykovo (the district's administrative centre) by road. Kashkalashi is the nearest rural locality.
