= Neyfeld =

Neyfeld Нейфельд
- Village
- Location within Bashkortostan Location within Russia
- Coordinates: 54°52′N 55°07′E
- Country: Russia
- Region: Bashkortostan
- District: Blagovarsky District
- Time zone: UTC+5:00

Neyfeld (Russian: Нейфельд) is a rural locality (a village) in Yanyshevsky Selsoviet, Blagovarsky District, Bashkortostan, Russia. The population was 33 as of 2010. There is 1 street.

== Geography ==
Neyfeld is located 34 km northeast of Yazykovo (the district's administrative centre) by road. Kyzyl-Yulduz is the nearest rural locality.
