= Kargalytamak =

Kargalytamak Каргалытамак
- Village
- Location within Bashkortostan Location within Russia
- Coordinates: 54°34′08″N 54°43′12″E
- Country: Russia
- Region: Bashkortostan
- District: Blagovarsky District
- Time zone: UTC+5:00

Kargalytamak (Russian: Каргалытамак; Bashkir: Ҡарғалытамаҡ, Qarğalıtamaq) is a rural locality (a village) in Kargalinsky Selsoviet, Blagovarsky District, Bashkortostan, Russia. The population was 80 as of 2010. There is 1 street.

== Geography ==
Kargalytamak is located 29 km southwest of Yazykovo (the district's administrative centre) by road. Nizhniye Kargaly is the nearest rural locality.
