= Yanbakty =

Yanbakty Янбакты
- Village
- Location within Bashkortostan Location within Russia
- Coordinates: 54°34′N 55°04′E
- Country: Russia
- Region: Bashkortostan
- District: Blagovarsky District
- Time zone: UTC+5:00

Yanbakty (Russian: Янбакты; Bashkir: Янбаҡты, Yanbaqtı) is a rural locality (a village) in Balyshlinsky Selsoviet, Blagovarsky District, Bashkortostan, Russia. The population was 59 as of 2010. There is 1 street.

== Geography ==
Yanbakty is located 10 km northwest of Yazykovo (the district's administrative centre) by road.
