= Slakbash, Blagovarsky District, Republic of Bashkortostan =

Slakbash Слакбаш
- Village
- Location within Bashkortostan Location within Russia
- Coordinates: 54°36′N 55°03′E
- Country: Russia
- Region: Bashkortostan
- District: Blagovarsky District
- Time zone: UTC+5:00

Slakbash (Russian: Слакбаш; Bashkir: Ыҫлаҡбаш, Iślaqbaş) is a rural locality (a village) in Yamakayevsky Selsoviet, Blagovarsky District, Bashkortostan, Russia. The population was 42 as of 2010. There is 1 street.

== Geography ==
Slakbash is located 16 km south of Yazykovo (the district's administrative centre) by road. Yamakay is the nearest rural locality.
