= Buzoulyk =

Buzoulyk Бузоулык
- Village
- Location within Bashkortostan Location within Russia
- Coordinates: 54°32′N 54°53′E
- Country: Russia
- Region: Bashkortostan
- District: Blagovarsky District
- Time zone: UTC+5:00

Buzoulyk (Russian: Бузоулык; Bashkir: Быҙаулыҡ, Bıźawlıq) is a rural locality (a village) in Udryakbashevsky Selsoviet, Blagovarsky District, Bashkortostan, Russia. The population was 84 as of 2010. There is 1 street.

== Geography ==
Buzoulyk is located 26 km southwest of Yazykovo (the district's administrative centre) by road. Tallykul is the nearest rural locality.
