= Uzybash =

Uzybash Узыбаш
- Village
- Location within Bashkortostan Location within Russia
- Coordinates: 54°41′N 55°06′E
- Country: Russia
- Region: Bashkortostan
- District: Blagovarsky District
- Time zone: UTC+5:00

Uzybash (Russian: Узыбаш; Bashkir: Уҙыбаш, Uźıbaş) is a rural locality (a village) in Yazykovsky Selsoviet, Blagovarsky District, Bashkortostan, Russia. The population was 238 as of 2010. There is 1 street.

== Geography ==
Uzybash is located 8 km east of Yazykovo (the district's administrative centre) by road. Yazykovo is the nearest rural locality.
