= Toporinka =

Toporinka Топоринка
- Village
- Location within Bashkortostan Location within Russia
- Coordinates: 54°43′N 54°54′E
- Country: Russia
- Region: Bashkortostan
- District: Blagovarsky District
- Time zone: UTC+5:00

Toporinka (Russian: Топоринка) is a rural locality (a village) in Yazykovsky Selsoviet, Blagovarsky District, Bashkortostan, Russia. The population was 322 as of 2010. There are 3 streets.

== Geography ==
Toporinka is located 13 km northwest of Yazykovo (the district's administrative centre) by road. Mirny is the nearest rural locality.
