= Yalankul =

Yalankul Яланкуль
- Village
- Location within Bashkortostan Location within Russia
- Coordinates: 54°29′N 54°51′E
- Country: Russia
- Region: Bashkortostan
- District: Blagovarsky District
- Time zone: UTC+5:00

Yalankul (Russian: Яланкуль; Bashkir: Яланкүл, Yalankül) is a rural locality (a village) in Udryakbashevsky Selsoviet, Blagovarsky District, Bashkortostan, Russia. The population was 43 as of 2010. There is 1 street.

== Geography ==
Yalankul is located 30 km southwest of Yazykovo (the district's administrative centre) by road. Kullekul is the nearest rural locality.
