= Novogolskoye =

Novogolskoye Новогольское
- Selo
- Location within Voronezh Oblast Location within Russia
- Coordinates: 51°29′N 41°27′E
- Country: Russia
- Region: Voronezh Oblast
- District: Gribanovsky District
- Time zone: UTC+3:00

Novogolskoye (Russian: Нового́льское) is a rural locality (a selo) and the administrative center of Novogolskoye Rural Settlement, Gribanovsky District, Voronezh Oblast, Russia. The population was 709 as of 2010. There are 10 streets.

== Geography ==
Novogolskoye is located 51 km west of Gribanovsky (the district's administrative centre) by road. Zarechye is the nearest rural locality.
