= Kullekul =

Kullekul Куллекул
- Village
- Location within Bashkortostan Location within Russia
- Coordinates: 54°28′N 54°54′E
- Country: Russia
- Region: Bashkortostan
- District: Blagovarsky District
- Time zone: UTC+5:00

Kullekul (Russian: Куллекул; Bashkir: Күллеҡул, Küllequl) is a rural locality (a village) in Udryakbashevsky Selsoviet, Blagovarsky District, Bashkortostan, Russia. The population was 153 as of 2010. There are 2 streets.

== Geography ==
Kullekul is located 28 km southwest of Yazykovo (the district's administrative centre) by road. Khaydarovo is the nearest rural locality.
