= Zur-Bulyak =

Zur-Bulyak Зур-Буляк
- Village
- Location within Bashkortostan Location within Russia
- Coordinates: 54°49′N 54°59′E
- Country: Russia
- Region: Bashkortostan
- District: Blagovarsky District
- Time zone: UTC+5:00

Zur-Bulyak (Russian: Зур-Буляк; Bashkir: Ҙур Бүләк, Źur Büläk) is a rural locality (a village) in Tanovsky Selsoviet, Blagovarsky District, Bashkortostan, Russia. The population was 82 as of 2010. There is 1 street.

== Geography ==
Zur-Bulyak is located 20 km south of Yazykovo (the district's administrative centre) by road. Tan is the nearest rural locality.
