= 1st Alkino =

1st Alkino 1-е Алкино 1-се Алкин 1-se Alkin
- Village
- Location within Bashkortostan Location within Russia
- Coordinates: 54.738056°N 54.714167°E
- Country: Russia
- Region: Bashkortostan
- District: Blagovarsky District
- Time zone: UTC+05:00

1st Alkino (Russian: 1-е Алкино; Bashkir: 1-се Алкин, 1-se Alkin) is a rural locality (a village) in Dmitriyevsky Selsoviet of Blagovarsky District, Russia. The population was 2 as of 2010.

== Geography ==
1st Alkino is located 58 km west of Yazykovo (the district's administrative centre) by road. Obshchina is the nearest rural locality.

== Ethnicity ==
The village is inhabited by Ukrainians and Russians.

== Streets ==
- Polevaya
