= Kyzyl-Chishma =

Kyzyl-Chishma Кызыл-Чишма
- Village
- Location within Bashkortostan Location within Russia
- Coordinates: 54°51′N 54°59′E
- Country: Russia
- Region: Bashkortostan
- District: Blagovarsky District
- Time zone: UTC+5:00

Kyzyl-Chishma (Russian: Кызыл-Чишма; Bashkir: Ҡыҙыл Шишмә, Qıźıl Şişmä) is a rural locality (a village) in Tanovsky Selsoviet, Blagovarsky District, Bashkortostan, Russia. The population was 47 as of 2010. There is 1 street.

== Geography ==
It is located 26 km north of Yazykovo (the district's administrative centre) by road. Agardy is the nearest rural locality.
