= Tyuryushtamak =

Tyuryushtamak Тюрюштамак
- Village
- Location within Bashkortostan Location within Russia
- Coordinates: 54°50′N 54°52′E
- Country: Russia
- Region: Bashkortostan
- District: Blagovarsky District
- Time zone: UTC+5:00

Tyuryushtamak (Russian: Тюрюштамак; Bashkir: Төрөштамаҡ, Töröştamaq) is a rural locality (a village) in Kucherbayevsky Selsoviet, Blagovarsky District, Bashkortostan, Russia. The population was 93 as of 2010. There is 1 street.

== Geography ==
Tyuryushtamak is located 40 km northwest of Yazykovo (the district's administrative centre) by road. Takchura is the nearest rural locality.
