= Blagovar =

Blagovar Благовар
- Selo
- Location within Bashkortostan Location within Russia
- Coordinates: 54°34′N 54°55′E
- Country: Russia
- Region: Bashkortostan
- District: Blagovarsky District
- Time zone: UTC+5:00

Blagovar (Russian: Благовар) is a rural locality (a selo) and the administrative centre of Blagovarsky Selsoviet, Blagovarsky District, Bashkortostan, Russia. The population was 2,061 as of 2010. There are 22 streets.

== Geography ==
Blagovar is located 14 km southwest of Yazykovo (the district's administrative centre) by road. Kamyshly is the nearest rural locality.
