= Starousmanovo =

Starousmanovo Староусманово
- Village
- Location within Bashkortostan Location within Russia
- Coordinates: 54°30′15″N 55°04′04″E
- Country: Russia
- Region: Bashkortostan
- District: Blagovarsky District
- Time zone: UTC+5:00

Starousmanovo (Russian: Староусманово; Bashkir: Иҫке Уҫман, İśke Uśman) is a rural locality (a village) in Balyshlinsky Selsoviet, Blagovarsky District, Bashkortostan, Russia. The population was 72 as of 2010. There are 2 streets.

== Geography ==
Starousmanovo is located 28 km south of Yazykovo (the district's administrative centre) by road. Novy Bulyak is the nearest rural locality.
