= Pokrovka 2-ya =

Pokrovka 2-ya Покровка 2-я
- Village
- Location within Bashkortostan Location within Russia
- Coordinates: 54°43′N 54°43′E
- Country: Russia
- Region: Bashkortostan
- District: Blagovarsky District
- Time zone: UTC+5:00

Pokrovka 2-ya (Russian: Покровка 2-я) is a rural locality (a village) in Pervomaysky Selsoviet, Blagovarsky District, Bashkortostan, Russia. The population was 6 as of 2010. There is 1 street.

== Geography ==
Pokrovka 2-ya is located 31 km west of Yazykovo (the district's administrative centre) by road. 1-ye Alkino is the nearest rural locality.
