= Bobrov, Russia =

Bobrov (Russian: Бобров) is the name of several inhabited localities in Russia.

Urban localities

- Bobrov, Bobrovsky District, Voronezh Oblast, a town in Bobrovsky District of Voronezh Oblast

Rural localities

- Bobrov, Bryansk Oblast, a village in Pavlinsky Selsoviet of Kletnyansky District of Bryansk Oblast
- Bobrov, Rostov Oblast, a khutor in Kiselevskoye Rural Settlement of Krasnosulinsky District of Rostov Oblast
- Bobrov, Nizhnedevitsky District, Voronezh Oblast, a khutor in Mikhnevskoye Rural Settlement of Nizhnedevitsky District of Voronezh Oblast
