= Dombrovka =

Dombrovka Домбровка
- Village
- Location within Bashkortostan Location within Russia
- Coordinates: 54°45′N 54°58′E
- Country: Russia
- Region: Bashkortostan
- District: Blagovarsky District
- Time zone: UTC+5:00

Dombrovka (Russian: Домбровка) is a rural locality (a village) in Yazykovsky Selsoviet, Blagovarsky District, Bashkortostan, Russia. The population was 388 as of 2010. There are two streets.

== Geography ==
Dombrovka is located 13 km north of Yazykovo (the district's administrative centre) by road. Khlebodarovka is the nearest rural locality.
