= Kob-Pokrovka =

Kob-Pokrovka Коб-Покровка
- Selo
- Location within Bashkortostan Location within Russia
- Coordinates: 54°42′N 55°00′E
- Country: Russia
- Region: Bashkortostan
- District: Blagovarsky District
- Time zone: UTC+5:00

Kob-Pokrovka (Russian: Коб-Покровка) is a rural locality (a selo) in Yazykovsky Selsoviet, Blagovarsky District, Bashkortostan, Russia. The population was 557 as of 2010. There are 2 streets.

== Geography ==
Kob-Pokrovka is located 4 km north of Yazykovo (the district's administrative centre) by road. Yazykovo is the nearest rural locality.
