= Vostochny, Blagovarsky District, Republic of Bashkortostan =

Vostochny Восточный
- Village
- Location within Bashkortostan Location within Russia
- Coordinates: 54°46′N 55°11′E
- Country: Russia
- Region: Bashkortostan
- District: Blagovarsky District
- Time zone: UTC+5:00

Vostochny (Russian: Восточный) is a rural locality (a village) in Kashkalashinsky Selsoviet, Blagovarsky District, Bashkortostan, Russia. The population was 297 as of 2010. There are 4 streets.

== Geography ==
Vostochny is located 26 km northeast of Yazykovo (the district's administrative centre) by road. Zapadny is the nearest rural locality.
