= Posyolok sovkhoza Pavlovka =

Posyolok sovkhoza Pavlovka Посёлок совхоза «Павловка»
- Settlement
- Location within Voronezh Oblast Location within Russia
- Coordinates: 51°41′N 42°09′E
- Country: Russia
- Region: Voronezh Oblast
- District: Gribanovsky District
- Time zone: UTC+3:00

Posyolok sovkhoza Pavlovka (Russian: Посёлок совхо́за «Па́вловка») is a rural locality (a settlement) in Posevkinskoye Rural Settlement, Gribanovsky District, Voronezh Oblast, Russia. The population was 341 as of 2010. There are 6 streets.

== Geography ==
The settlement is located 41 km northeast of Gribanovsky (the district's administrative centre) by road. Posevkino is the nearest rural locality.
