= Tallykul =

Tallykul Таллыкуль
- Village
- Location within Bashkortostan Location within Russia
- Coordinates: 54°32′N 54°52′E
- Country: Russia
- Region: Bashkortostan
- District: Blagovarsky District
- Time zone: UTC+5:00

Tallykul (Russian: Таллыкуль; Bashkir: Таллыкүл, Tallıkül) is a rural locality (a village) in Udryakbashevsky Selsoviet, Blagovarsky District, Bashkortostan, Russia. The population was 88 as of 2010. There is 1 street.

== Geography ==
Tallykul is located 27 km southwest of Yazykovo (the district's administrative centre) by road. Buzoulyk is the nearest rural locality.
