= Agardy =

Agardy Агарды
- Selo
- Location within Bashkortostan Location within Russia
- Coordinates: 54°51′N 55°02′E
- Country: Russia
- Region: Bashkortostan
- District: Blagovarsky District
- Time zone: UTC+5:00

Agardy (Russian: Агарды; Bashkir: Ағарҙы, Ağarźı) is a rural locality (a selo) in Tanovsky Selsoviet, Blagovarsky District, Bashkortostan, Russia. The population was 221 as of 2010. There are 3 streets.

== Geography ==
Agardy is located 23 km north of Yazykovo (the district's administrative centre) by road. Novy Syntash is the nearest rural locality.
