= Nizhniye Kargaly =

Nizhniye Kargaly Нижние Каргалы
- Village
- Location within Bashkortostan Location within Russia
- Coordinates: 54°33′N 54°45′E
- Country: Russia
- Region: Bashkortostan
- District: Blagovarsky District
- Time zone: UTC+5:00

Nizhniye Kargaly (Russian: Нижние Каргалы; Bashkir: Түбәнге Ҡарғалы, Tübänge Qarğalı) is a rural locality (a village) in Kargalinsky Selsoviet, Blagovarsky District, Bashkortostan, Russia. The population was 179 as of 2010. There is 1 street.

== Geography ==
Nizhniye Kargaly is located 27 km southwest of Yazykovo (the district's administrative centre) by road. Verkhniye Kargaly is the nearest rural locality.
