= Novoabzanovo =

Novoabzanovo Новоабзаново
- Village
- Location within Bashkortostan Location within Russia
- Coordinates: 54°54′N 54°44′E
- Country: Russia
- Region: Bashkortostan
- District: Blagovarsky District
- Time zone: UTC+5:00

Novoabzanovo (Russian: Новоабзаново; Bashkir: Яңы Абзан, Yañı Abzan) is a rural locality (a village) in Kucherbayevsky Selsoviet, Blagovarsky District, Bashkortostan, Russia. The population was 132 as of 2010. There is 1 street.

== Geography ==
Novoabzanovo is located 40 km northwest of Yazykovo (the district's administrative centre) by road. Chulpan 2-y is the nearest rural locality.
