= 6th Alkino =

6th Alkino 6-е Алкино 6-сы Алкин 6-sı Alkin
- Village
- Location within Bashkortostan Location within Russia
- Coordinates: 54.746389°N 54.661111°E
- Country: Russia
- Region: Bashkortostan
- District: Blagovarsky District
- Time zone: UTC+05:00

6th Alkino (Russian: 6-е Алкино; Bashkir: 6-сы Алкин, 6-sı Alkin) is a rural locality (a settlement) in Dmitriyevsky Selsovet of Blagovarsky District, Russia. The population was 148 as of 2010.

== Geography ==
6th Alkino is located 54 km west of Yazykovo (the district's administrative centre) by road. Obshchina is the nearest rural locality.

== Ethnicity ==
The village is inhabited by Tatars, Russians and others.

== Streets ==
- Rechnaya
