= Kargalybash =

Kargalybash Каргалыбаш
- Village
- Location within Bashkortostan Location within Russia
- Coordinates: 54°31′N 54°46′E
- Country: Russia
- Region: Bashkortostan
- District: Blagovarsky District
- Time zone: UTC+5:00

Kargalybash (Russian: Каргалыбаш; Bashkir: Ҡарғалыбаш, Qarğalıbaş) is a rural locality (a village) in Kargalinsky Selsoviet, Blagovarsky District, Bashkortostan, Russia.

== Population ==
The population was 199 as of 2010. There is 1 street.

== Geography ==
Kargalybash is located 33 km southwest of Yazykovo (the district's administrative centre) by road. Verkhniye Kargaly is the nearest rural locality.
