= Stary Syntash =

Stary Syntash Старый Сынташ
- Village
- Location within Bashkortostan Location within Russia
- Coordinates: 54°53′N 55°02′E
- Country: Russia
- Region: Bashkortostan
- District: Blagovarsky District
- Time zone: UTC+5:00

Stary Syntash (Russian: Старый Сынташ; Bashkir: Иҫке Һынташ, İśke Hıntaş) is a rural locality (a village) in Kucherbayevsky Selsoviet, Blagovarsky District, Bashkortostan, Russia. The population was 37 as of 2010. There is 1 street.

== Geography ==
Stary Syntash is located 35 km north of Yazykovo (the district's administrative centre) by road. Novy Syntash is the nearest rural locality.
