= Bashbulyak =

Башбуляк Ахметово
- Village
- Location within Bashkortostan Location within Russia
- Coordinates: 54°35′N 55°01′E
- Country: Russia
- Region: Bashkortostan
- District: Blagovarsky District
- Time zone: UTC+5:00

Bashbulyak (Russian: Башбуляк; Bashkir: Башбүләк, Başbüläk) is a rural locality (a village) in Balyshlinsky Selsoviet, Blagovarsky District, Bashkortostan, Russia. The population was 10 as of 2010. There is 1 street.

== Geography ==
Bashbulyak is located 26 km south of Yazykovo (the district's administrative centre) by road. Slakbash is the nearest rural locality.
