= Verkhniye Kargaly =

Verkhniye Kargaly Верхние Каргалы
- Selo
- Location within Bashkortostan Location within Russia
- Coordinates: 54°33′N 54°46′E
- Country: Russia
- Region: Bashkortostan
- District: Blagovarsky District
- Time zone: UTC+5:00

Verkhniye Kargaly (Russian: Верхние Каргалы; Bashkir: Үрге Ҡарғалы, Ürge Qarğalı) is a rural locality (a selo) and the administrative centre of Kargalinsky Selsoviet, Blagovarsky District, Bashkortostan, Russia. The population was 259 as of 2010. There is 1 street.

== Geography ==
Verkhniye Kargaly is located 29 km southwest of Yazykovo (the district's administrative centre) by road. Kargalybash is the nearest rural locality.
