= Tyurkeyevo =

Tyurkeyevo Тюркеево
- Village
- Location within Bashkortostan Location within Russia
- Coordinates: 54°53′N 54°56′E
- Country: Russia
- Region: Bashkortostan
- District: Blagovarsky District
- Time zone: UTC+5:00

Tyurkeyevo (Russian: Тюркеево; Bashkir: Төркәй, Törkäy) is a rural locality (a village) in Kucherbayevsky Selsoviet, Blagovarsky District, Bashkortostan, Russia. The population was 118 as of 2010. There is 1 street.

== Geography ==
Tyurkeyevo is located 28 km north of Yazykovo (the district's administrative centre) by road. Akhmetovo is the nearest rural locality.
