= Kashkalashi =

Kashkalashi Кашкалаши
- Selo
- Location within Bashkortostan Location within Russia
- Coordinates: 54°44′N 55°10′E
- Country: Russia
- Region: Bashkortostan
- District: Blagovarsky District
- Time zone: UTC+5:00

Kashkalashi (Russian: Кашкалаши; Bashkir: Ҡашҡалаша, Qaşqalaşa) is a rural locality (a village) and the administrative centre of Kashkalashinsky Selsoviet, Blagovarsky District, Bashkortostan, Russia. The population was 611 as of 2010. There are 6 streets.

== Geography ==
Kashkalashi is located 19 km west of Yazykovo (the district's administrative centre) by road. Leonidovka is the nearest rural locality.
