= Obshchina, Blagovarsky District, Republic of Bashkortostan =

Obshchina Община
- Village
- Location within Bashkortostan Location within Russia
- Coordinates: 54°44′N 54°41′E
- Country: Russia
- Region: Bashkortostan
- District: Blagovarsky District
- Time zone: UTC+5:00

Obshchina (Russian: Община) is a rural locality (a village) in Dmitriyevsky Selsoviet, Blagovarsky District, Bashkortostan, Russia. The population was 69 as of 2010. There is 1 street.

== Geography ==
Obshchina is located 55 km northwest of Yazykovo (the district's administrative centre) by road. 6-ye Alkino is the nearest rural locality.
