= Gribanovsky =

Gribanovsky (masculine), Gribanovskaya (feminine), or Gribanovskoye (neuter) may refer to:

- Gribanovsky District, a district of Voronezh Oblast, Russia
- Gribanovsky (inhabited locality) (Gribanovskaya, Gribanovskoye), several inhabited localities in Russia
