= Sarayly =

Sarayly Сарайлы
- Village
- Location within Bashkortostan Location within Russia
- Coordinates: 54°32′N 55°03′E
- Country: Russia
- Region: Bashkortostan
- District: Blagovarsky District
- Time zone: UTC+5:00

Sarayly (Russian: Сарайлы; Bashkir: Һарайлы, Haraylı) is a rural locality (a village) in Balyshlinsky Selsoviet, Blagovarsky District, Bashkortostan, Russia. The population was 264 as of 2010. There are 3 streets.

== Geography ==
Sarayly is located 24 km south of Yazykovo (the district's administrative centre) by road. Balyshly is the nearest rural locality.
