= Bashterma =

Bashterma Баштерма
- Village
- Location within Bashkortostan Location within Russia
- Coordinates: 54°36′N 55°08′E
- Country: Russia
- Region: Bashkortostan
- District: Blagovarsky District
- Time zone: UTC+5:00

Bashterma (Russian: Баштерма; Bashkir: Баштирмә, Baştirmä) is a rural locality (a village) in Yamakayevsky Selsoviet, Blagovarsky District, Bashkortostan, Russia. The population was 17 as of 2010. There is 1 street.

== Geography ==
Bashterma is located 20 km southeast of Yazykovo (the district's administrative centre) by road. Slak is the nearest rural locality.
