= Kugul, Republic of Bashkortostan =

Kugul Кугуль
- Village
- Location within Bashkortostan Location within Russia
- Coordinates: 54°51′N 54°45′E
- Country: Russia
- Region: Bashkortostan
- District: Blagovarsky District
- Time zone: UTC+5:00

Kugul (Russian: Кугуль; Bashkir: Күгел, Kügel) is a rural locality (a village) in Tanovsky Selsoviet, Blagovarsky District, Bashkortostan, Russia. The population was 71 as of 2010. There is 1 street.

== Geography ==
Kugul is located 19 km north of Yazykovo (the district's administrative centre) by road. Viktorovka is the nearest rural locality.
