= Listopadovka =

Listopadovka Листопадовка
- Selo
- Location within Voronezh Oblast Location within Russia
- Coordinates: 51°24′N 41°26′E
- Country: Russia
- Region: Voronezh Oblast
- District: Gribanovsky District
- Time zone: UTC+3:00

Listopadovka (Russian: Листопа́довка) is a rural locality (a selo) and the administrative center of Listopadovskoye Rural Settlement, Gribanovsky District, Voronezh Oblast, Russia. The population was 2,286 as of 2010. There are 12 streets.

== Geography ==
Listopadovka is located 44 km west of Gribanovsky (the district's administrative centre) by road. Krasovka is the nearest rural locality.
