= Bolshiye Alabukhi =

Bolshiye Alabukhi Большие Алабухи
- Selo
- Location within Voronezh Oblast Location within Russia
- Coordinates: 51°34′N 42°14′E
- Country: Russia
- Region: Voronezh Oblast
- District: Gribanovsky District
- Time zone: UTC+3:00

Bolshiye Alabukhi (Russian: Больши́е Ала́бухи) is a rural locality (a selo) and the administrative center of Bolshealabukhskoye Rural Settlement, Gribanovsky District, Voronezh Oblast, Russia. The population was 626 as of 2010. There are 17 streets.

== Geography ==
Bolshiye Alabukhi is located 28 km northeast of Gribanovsky (the district's administrative centre) by road. Vlasovka is the nearest rural locality.
