= Verkhny Karachan =

Verkhny Karachan Верхний Карачан
- Selo
- Location within Voronezh Oblast Location within Russia
- Coordinates: 51°24′N 41°46′E
- Country: Russia
- Region: Voronezh Oblast
- District: Gribanovsky District
- Time zone: UTC+3:00

Verkhny Karachan (Russian: Ве́рхний Карача́н) is a rural locality (a selo) and the administrative center of Verkhnekarachanskoye Rural Settlement, Gribanovsky District, Voronezh Oblast, Russia. In the 19th century the village was part of Verkhnekarachanskaya volost, Novokhopyorsky Uyezd, Voronezh Governorate. The population was 1,977 as of 2010. There are 29 streets.

== Geography ==
Verkhny Karachan is located 17 km west of Gribanovsky (the district's administrative centre) by road. Sredny Karachan is the nearest rural locality.
