= Novoalexandrovka, Blagovarsky District, Republic of Bashkortostan =

Novoalexandrovka Новоалександровка
- Selo
- Location within Bashkortostan Location within Russia
- Coordinates: 54°39′N 54°52′E
- Country: Russia
- Region: Bashkortostan
- District: Blagovarsky District
- Time zone: UTC+5:00

Novoalexandrovka (Russian: Новоалександровка) is a rural locality (a selo) in Blagovarsky Selsoviet, Blagovarsky District, Bashkortostan, Russia. The population was 217 as of 2010. There are 2 streets.

== Geography ==
Novoalexandrovka is located 24 km southwest of Yazykovo (the district's administrative centre) by road. Kirillo-Karmasan is the nearest rural locality.
