= Udryakbash =

Udryakbash Удрякбаш
- Selo
- Location within Bashkortostan Location within Russia
- Coordinates: 54°31′N 54°57′E
- Country: Russia
- Region: Bashkortostan
- District: Blagovarsky District
- Time zone: UTC+5:00

Udryakbash (Russian: Удрякбаш; Bashkir: Өйҙөрәкбаш, Öyźöräkbaş) is a rural locality (a selo) and the administrative centre of Udryakbashevsky Selsoviet, Blagovarsky District, Bashkortostan, Russia. The population was 540 as of 2010. There are 5 streets.

== Geography ==
Udryakbash is located 21 km south of Yazykovo (the district's administrative centre) by road. Yaparkul is the nearest rural locality.
