= Kamyshly, Blagovarsky District, Republic of Bashkortostan =

Kamyshly Камышлы
- Village
- Location within Bashkortostan Location within Russia
- Coordinates: 54°34′N 54°57′E
- Country: Russia
- Region: Bashkortostan
- District: Blagovarsky District
- Time zone: UTC+5:00

Kamyshly (Russian: Камышлы; Bashkir: Ҡамышлы, Qamışlı) is a rural locality (a village) in Udryakbashevsky Selsoviet, Blagovarsky District, Bashkortostan, Russia. The population was 3 as of 2010. There is 1 street.

== Geography ==
Kamyshly is located 17 km southwest of Yazykovo (the district's administrative centre) by road. Blagovar is the nearest rural locality.
