= Novogolyelan =

Novogolyelan Новогольелань
- Selo
- Location within Voronezh Oblast Location within Russia
- Coordinates: 51°30′N 41°15′E
- Country: Russia
- Region: Voronezh Oblast
- District: Gribanovsky District
- Time zone: UTC+3:00

Novogolyelan (Russian: Новогольела́нь) is a rural locality (a selo) and the administrative center of Novogolyelanskoye Rural Settlement, Gribanovsky District, Voronezh Oblast, Russia. The population was 639 as of 2010. There are 8 streets.

== Geography ==
Novogolyelan is located 62 km west of Gribanovsky (the district's administrative centre) by road. Khomutovka is the nearest rural locality.
