= Dusmetovo =

Dusmetovo Дусметово
- Village
- Location within Bashkortostan Location within Russia
- Coordinates: 54°55′N 55°01′E
- Country: Russia
- Region: Bashkortostan
- District: Blagovarsky District
- Time zone: UTC+5:00

Dusmetovo (Russian: Дусметово; Bashkir: Дүсмәт, Düsmät) is a rural locality (a village) in Kucherbayevsky Selsoviet, Blagovarsky District, Bashkortostan, Russia. The population was 388 as of 2010. There is 1 street.

== Geography ==
Dusmetovo is located 34 km north of Yazykovo (the district's administrative centre) by road. Uly-Aryama is the nearest rural locality.
