= Takchura =

Takchura Такчура
- Selo
- Location within Bashkortostan Location within Russia
- Coordinates: 54°50′N 54°53′E
- Country: Russia
- Region: Bashkortostan
- District: Blagovarsky District
- Time zone: UTC+5:00

Takchura (Russian: Такчура; Bashkir: Таҡсура, Taqsura) is a rural locality (a selo) in Tanovsky Selsoviet, Blagovarsky District, Bashkortostan, Russia. The population was 173 as of 2010. There is 1 street.

== Geography ==
Takchura is located 29 km northwest of Yazykovo (the district's administrative centre) by road. Tyuryushtamak is the nearest rural locality.
