= Klimentovka =

Klimentovka Климентовка
- Village
- Location within Bashkortostan Location within Russia
- Coordinates: 54°51′N 54°45′E
- Country: Russia
- Region: Bashkortostan
- District: Blagovarsky District
- Time zone: UTC+5:00

Klimentovka (Russian: Климентовка) is a rural locality (a village) in Kucherbayevsky Selsoviet, Blagovarsky District, Bashkortostan, Russia. The population was 12 as of 2010. There is 1 street.

== Geography ==
Klimentovka is located 45 km northwest of Yazykovo (the district's administrative centre) by road. Lomovo is the nearest rural locality.
