= Tan, Blagovarsky District, Republic of Bashkortostan =

Tan Тан
- Selo
- Location within Bashkortostan Location within Russia
- Coordinates: 54°49′N 55°00′E
- Country: Russia
- Region: Bashkortostan
- District: Blagovarsky District
- Time zone: UTC+5:00

Tan (Russian: Тан; Bashkir: Таң, Tañ) is a rural locality (a selo) and the administrative centre of Tanovsky Selsoviet, Blagovarsky District, Bashkortostan, Russia. The population was 648 as of 2010. There are 10 streets.

== Geography ==
Tan is located 18 km north of Yazykovo (the district's administrative centre) by road. Zur-Bulyak is the nearest rural locality.
