= Kutki, Voronezh Oblast =

Kutki Кутки
- Selo
- Location within Voronezh Oblast Location within Russia
- Coordinates: 51°20′N 41°32′E
- Country: Russia
- Region: Voronezh Oblast
- District: Gribanovsky District
- Time zone: UTC+3:00

Kutki (Russian: Ку́тки) is a rural locality (a selo) and the administrative center of Kutkovskoye Rural Settlement, Gribanovsky District, Voronezh Oblast, Russia. The population was 470 as of 2010. There are 7 streets.

== Geography ==
Kutki is located 42 km southwest of Gribanovsky (the district's administrative centre) by road. Troitskoye is the nearest rural locality.
