= Starokucherbayevo =

Starokucherbayevo Старокучербаево
- Selo
- Location within Bashkortostan Location within Russia
- Coordinates: 54°54′N 54°51′E
- Country: Russia
- Region: Bashkortostan
- District: Blagovarsky District
- Time zone: UTC+5:00

Starokucherbayevo (Russian: Старокучербаево; Bashkir: Иҫке Күсәрбай, İśke Küsärbay) is a rural locality (a village) and the administrative centre of Kucherbayevsky Selsoviet, Blagovarsky District, Bashkortostan, Russia. The population was 1,309 as of 2010. There are 16 streets.

== Geography ==
Starokucherbayevo is located 33 km north of Yazykovo (the district's administrative centre) by road. Staroabzanovo is the nearest rural locality.
