= Usmanovo, Blagovarsky District, Republic of Bashkortostan =

Usmanovo Усманово
- Village
- Location within Bashkortostan Location within Russia
- Coordinates: 54°50′N 54°54′E
- Country: Russia
- Region: Bashkortostan
- District: Blagovarsky District
- Time zone: UTC+5:00

Usmanovo (Russian: Усманово; Bashkir: Уҫман, Uśman) is a rural locality (a village) in Tanovsky Selsoviet, Blagovarsky District, Bashkortostan, Russia. The population was 54 as of 2010. There is 1 street.

== Geography ==
Usmanovo is located 27 km north of Yazykovo (the district's administrative centre) by road. Takchura is the nearest rural locality.
