= Novy Troitsky =

Novy Troitsky Новый Троицкий
- Village
- Location within Bashkortostan Location within Russia
- Coordinates: 54°34′N 55°04′E
- Country: Russia
- Region: Bashkortostan
- District: Blagovarsky District
- Time zone: UTC+5:00

Novy Troitsky (Russian: Новый Троицкий) is a rural locality (a village) in Balyshlinsky Selsoviet, Blagovarsky District, Bashkortostan, Russia. The population was 37 as of 2010. There is 1 street.

== Geography ==
Novy Troitsky is located 28 km south of Yazykovo (the district's administrative centre) by road. Bik-Usak is the nearest rural locality.
