= Vlasovka =

Vlasovka Власовка
- Selo
- Location within Voronezh Oblast Location within Russia
- Coordinates: 51°33′N 42°18′E
- Country: Russia
- Region: Voronezh Oblast
- District: Gribanovsky District
- Time zone: UTC+3:00

Vlasovka (Russian: Вла́совка) is a rural locality (a selo) in Bolshealabukhskoye Rural Settlement, Gribanovsky District, Voronezh Oblast, Russia. The population was 147 as of 2010. There are 3 streets.

== Geography ==
Vlasovka is located 36 km northeast of Gribanovsky (the district's administrative centre) by road. Bolshiye Alabukhi is the nearest rural locality.
