= Malye Alabukhi 2-ye =

Malye Alabukhi 2-ye Малые Алабухи 2-е
- Selo
- Location within Voronezh Oblast Location within Russia
- Coordinates: 51°33′N 42°11′E
- Country: Russia
- Region: Voronezh Oblast
- District: Gribanovsky District
- Time zone: UTC+3:00

Malye Alabukhi 2-ye (Russian: Ма́лые Ала́бухи 2-е) is a rural locality (a selo) in Maloabukhskoye Rural Settlement, Gribanovsky District, Voronezh Oblast, Russia. The population was 257 as of 2010. There are 7 streets.

== Geography ==
Malye Alabukhi 2-ye is located 24 km northeast of Gribanovsky (the district's administrative centre) by road. Malye Alabukhi 1-ye is the nearest rural locality.
