= Novy Syntash =

Novy Syntash Новый Сынташ
- Village
- Location within Bashkortostan Location within Russia
- Coordinates: 54°52′N 55°01′E
- Country: Russia
- Region: Bashkortostan
- District: Blagovarsky District
- Time zone: UTC+5:00

Novy Syntash (Russian: Новый Сынташ; Bashkir: Яңы Һынташ, Yañı Hıntaş) is a rural locality (a village) in Kucherbayevsky Selsoviet, Blagovarsky District, Bashkortostan, Russia. The population was 43 as of 2010. There are 2 streets.

== Geography ==
Novy Syntash is located 35 km north of Yazykovo (the district's administrative centre) by road. Stary Syntash is the nearest rural locality.
