= Staroabzanovo =

Settlement in Bashkortostan, Russia

Staroabzanovo Староабзаново
- Selo
- Location within Bashkortostan Location within Russia
- Coordinates: 54°54′N 54°47′E
- Country: Russia
- Region: Bashkortostan
- District: Blagovarsky District
- Time zone: UTC+5:00

Staroabzanovo (Russian: Староабзаново; Bashkir: Иҫке Абзан, İśke Abzan) is a rural locality (a selo) in Kucherbayevsky Selsoviet, Blagovarsky District, Bashkortostan, Russia. The population was 319 as of 2010. There are 4 streets.

== Geography ==
Staroabzanovo is located 37 km northwest of Yazykovo (the district's administrative centre) by road. Starokucherbayevo is the nearest rural locality.
