= Staryye Sanny =

Staryye Sanny Старые Санны
- Selo
- Location within Bashkortostan Location within Russia
- Coordinates: 54°40′N 54°43′E
- Country: Russia
- Region: Bashkortostan
- District: Blagovarsky District
- Time zone: UTC+5:00

Staryye Sanny (Russian: Старые Санны; Bashkir: Иҫке Һынны, İśke Hınnı) is a rural locality (a selo) in Pervomaysky Selsoviet, Blagovarsky District, Bashkortostan, Russia. The population was 417 as of 2010. There are 9 streets.

== Geography ==
Staryye Sanny is located 26 km west of Yazykovo (the district's administrative centre) by road. Pervomaysky is the nearest rural locality.
