= Kyzyl-Yulduz, Blagovarsky District, Republic of Bashkortostan =

Kyzyl-Yulduz Кызыл-Юлдуз
- Village
- Location within Bashkortostan Location within Russia
- Coordinates: 54°52′N 55°06′E
- Country: Russia
- Region: Bashkortostan
- District: Blagovarsky District
- Time zone: UTC+5:00

Kyzyl-Yulduz (Russian: Кызыл-Юлдуз; Bashkir: Ҡыҙыл Йондоҙ, Qıźıl Yondoź) is a rural locality (a village) in Yanyshevsky Selsoviet, Blagovarsky District, Bashkortostan, Russia. The population was 51 as of 2010. There is 1 street.

== Geography ==
Kyzyl-Yulduz is located 35 km north of Yazykovo (the district's administrative centre) by road. Neyfeld is the nearest rural locality.
