= Pervomaysky, Blagovarsky District, Republic of Bashkortostan =

Pervomaysky Первомайский
- Selo
- Location within Bashkortostan Location within Russia
- Coordinates: 54°40′N 54°48′E
- Country: Russia
- Region: Bashkortostan
- District: Blagovarsky District

Population
  - Total: 970
- Time zone: UTC+5:00

Pervomaysky (Russian: Первомайский) is a rural locality (a selo) and the administrative centre of Pervomaysky Selsoviet, Blagovarsky District, Bashkortostan, Russia. The population was 970 as of 2010. There are 18 streets.

== Geography ==
Pervomaysky is located 21 km west of Yazykovo (the district's administrative centre) by road. Starye Sanny is the nearest rural locality.
