= Uly-Aryama =

Uly-Aryama Улы-Аряма
- Village
- Location within Bashkortostan Location within Russia
- Coordinates: 54°55′N 55°00′E
- Country: Russia
- Region: Bashkortostan
- District: Blagovarsky District
- Time zone: UTC+5:00

Uly-Aryama (Russian: Улы-Аряма; Bashkir: Оло Әрәмә, Olo Ärämä) is a rural locality (a village) in Kucherbayevsky Selsoviet, Blagovarsky District, Bashkortostan, Russia. The population was 117 as of 2010. There is 1 street.

== Geography ==
Uly-Aryama is located 32 km north of Yazykovo (the district's administrative centre) by road. Syntashtamak is the nearest rural locality.
