= Kirillo-Karmasan =

Kirillo-Karmasan Кирилло-Кармасан
- Village
- Location within Bashkortostan Location within Russia
- Coordinates: 54°38′N 54°55′E
- Country: Russia
- Region: Bashkortostan
- District: Blagovarsky District
- Time zone: UTC+5:00

Kirillo-Karmasan (Russian: Кирилло-Кармасан; Bashkir: Кирилл-Ҡармасан, Kirill-Qarmasan) is a rural locality (a village) in Blagovarsky Selsoviet, Blagovarsky District, Bashkortostan, Russia. The population was 2 as of 2010. There is 1 street.

== Geography ==
Kirillo-Karmasan is located 12 km southwest of Yazykovo (the district's administrative centre) by road. Samarino is the nearest rural locality.
