= Kirsanovka =

Kirsanovka Кирсановка
- Selo
- Location within Voronezh Oblast Location within Russia
- Coordinates: 51°27′N 41°47′E
- Country: Russia
- Region: Voronezh Oblast
- District: Gribanovsky District
- Time zone: UTC+3:00

Kirsanovka (Russian: Кирса́новка) is a rural locality (a selo) and the administrative center of Kirsanovskoye Rural Settlement, Gribanovsky District, Voronezh Oblast, Russia. The population was 912 as of 2010. There are 17 streets.

== Geography ==
Kirsanovka is located 22 km west of Gribanovsky (the district's administrative centre) by road. Yemelyanovka is the nearest rural locality.
