= Bik-Usak =

Bik-Usak Бик-Усак
- Village
- Location within Bashkortostan Location within Russia
- Coordinates: 54°35′N 55°05′E
- Country: Russia
- Region: Bashkortostan
- District: Blagovarsky District
- Time zone: UTC+5:00

Bik-Usak (Russian: Бик-Усак; Bashkir: Бейек Уҫаҡ, Beyek Uśaq) is a rural locality (a village) in Yamakayevsky Selsoviet, Blagovarsky District, Bashkortostan, Russia. The population was 34 as of 2010. There is 1 street.

== Geography ==
Bik-Usak is located 20 km southeast of Yazykovo (the district's administrative centre) by road. Slakbash is the nearest rural locality.
