= Yanyshevo =

Yanyshevo Янышево
- Selo
- Location within Bashkortostan Location within Russia
- Coordinates: 54°55′N 55°05′E
- Country: Russia
- Region: Bashkortostan
- District: Blagovarsky District
- Time zone: UTC+5:00

Yanyshevo (Russian: Янышево; Bashkir: Яныш, Yanış) is a rural locality (a selo) in Yanyshevsky Selsoviet, Blagovarsky District, Bashkortostan, Russia. The population was 403 as of 2010. There are 7 streets.

== Geography ==
Yanyshevo is located 34 km north of Yazykovo (the district's administrative centre) by road. Sharlyk is the nearest rural locality.
