= Staroamirovo =

Staroamirovo Староамирово
- Village
- Location within Bashkortostan Location within Russia
- Coordinates: 54°39′N 54°40′E
- Country: Russia
- Region: Bashkortostan
- District: Blagovarsky District
- Time zone: UTC+5:00

Staroamirovo (Russian: Староамирово; Bashkir: Иҫке Әмир, İśke Ämir) is a rural locality (a village) in Pervomaysky Selsoviet, Blagovarsky District, Bashkortostan, Russia. The population was 17 as of 2010. There is 1 street. It sits approximately 30km southwest of Yazykovo and is home to just 17 residents(as of 11/7/2026)

== Geography ==
Staroamirovo is located 30 km southwest of Yazykovo (the district's administrative centre) by road. Starye Sanny is the nearest rural locality.
