= Yamakay =

Yamakay Ямакай
- Selo
- Location within Bashkortostan Location within Russia
- Coordinates: 54°37′N 55°05′E
- Country: Russia
- Region: Bashkortostan
- District: Blagovarsky District
- Time zone: UTC+5:00

Yamakay (Russian: Ямакай; Bashkir: Ямаҡай, Yamaqay) is a rural locality (a selo) and the administrative centre of Yamakayevsky Selsoviet, Blagovarsky District, Bashkortostan, Russia. The population was 232 as of 2010. There are 3 streets.

== Geography ==
Yamakay is located 16 km southeast of Yazykovo (the district's administrative centre) by road. Barsuan is the nearest rural locality.
