= Novy Bulyak =

Novy Bulyak Новый Буляк
- Village
- Location within Bashkortostan Location within Russia
- Coordinates: 54°32′N 55°03′E
- Country: Russia
- Region: Bashkortostan
- District: Blagovarsky District
- Time zone: UTC+5:00

Novy Bulyak (Russian: Новый Буляк; Bashkir: Яңы Бүләк, Yañı Büläk) is a rural locality (a village) in Balyshlinsky Selsoviet, Blagovarsky District, Bashkortostan, Russia. The population was 100 as of 2010. There is 1 street.

== Geography ==
Novy Bulyak is located 24 km south of Yazykovo (the district's administrative centre) by road. Balyshly is the nearest rural locality.
