= Viktorovka =

Viktorovka Викторовка
- Village
- Location within Bashkortostan Location within Russia
- Coordinates: 54°48′N 55°05′E
- Country: Russia
- Region: Bashkortostan
- District: Blagovarsky District
- Time zone: UTC+5:00

Viktorovka (Russian: Викторовка) is a rural locality (a village) in Alexeyevsky Selsoviet, Blagovarsky District, Bashkortostan, Russia. The population was 190 as of 2010. There is 1 street.

== Geography ==
Viktorovka is located 35 km north of Yazykovo (the district's administrative centre) by road. Kugul is the nearest rural locality.
