= Krasnorechenka =

Krasnorechenka Краснореченка
- Selo
- Location within Voronezh Oblast Location within Russia
- Coordinates: 51°22′N 41°16′E
- Country: Russia
- Region: Voronezh Oblast
- District: Gribanovsky District
- Time zone: UTC+3:00

Krasnorechenka (Russian: Красноре́ченка) is a rural locality (a selo) and the administrative center of Krasnorechenskoye Rural Settlement, Gribanovsky District, Voronezh Oblast, Russia. The population was 373 as of 2010. There are 5 streets.

== Geography ==
Krasnorechenka is located 58 km west of Gribanovsky (the district's administrative centre) by road. Podgornoye is the nearest rural locality.
