= Syntashtamak =

Syntashtamak Сынташтамак
- Village
- Location within Bashkortostan Location within Russia
- Coordinates: 54°54′N 55°00′E
- Country: Russia
- Region: Bashkortostan
- District: Blagovarsky District
- Time zone: UTC+5:00

Syntashtamak (Russian: Сынташтамак; Bashkir: Һынташтамаҡ, Hıntaştamaq) is a rural locality (a village) in Kucherbayevsky Selsoviet, Blagovarsky District, Bashkortostan, Russia. The population was 208 as of 2010. There are 3 streets.

== Geography ==
Syntashtamak is located 31 km north of Yazykovo (the district's administrative centre) by road. Uly-Aryama is the nearest rural locality.
