= Gribanovsky (inhabited locality) =

Gribanovsky (Russian: Грибановский; masculine), Gribanovskaya (Грибановская; feminine), or Gribanovskoye (Грибановское; neuter) is the name of several inhabited localities in Russia.

Urban localities

- Gribanovsky (urban-type settlement), an urban-type settlement in Gribanovsky District of Voronezh Oblast

Rural localities

- Gribanovskaya, Krasnoborsky District, Arkhangelsk Oblast, a village in Belosludsky Selsoviet of Krasnoborsky District of Arkhangelsk Oblast
- Gribanovskaya, Onezhsky District, Arkhangelsk Oblast, a village in Kokorinsky Selsoviet of Onezhsky District of Arkhangelsk Oblast
- Gribanovskaya, Kirov Oblast, a village in Ichetovkinsky Rural Okrug of Afanasyevsky District of Kirov Oblast
- Gribanovskaya, Leningrad Oblast, a village in Vinnitskoye Settlement Municipal Formation of Podporozhsky District of Leningrad Oblast
