= Starogornovo =

Starogornovo Старогорново
- Village
- Location within Bashkortostan Location within Russia
- Coordinates: 54°44′N 55°01′E
- Country: Russia
- Region: Bashkortostan
- District: Blagovarsky District
- Time zone: UTC+5:00

Starogornovo (Russian: Старогорново) is a rural locality (a village) in Blagovarsky District, Bashkortostan, Russia. The population was 10 as of 2010. There is 1 street.

== Geography ==
Starogornovo is located 9 km north of Yazykovo (the district's administrative centre) by road. Khlebodarovka is the nearest rural locality.
