= Alexeyevka, Gribanovsky District, Voronezh Oblast =

Alexeyevka Алексеевка
- Selo
- Location within Voronezh Oblast Location within Russia
- Coordinates: 51°36′N 42°00′E
- Country: Russia
- Region: Voronezh Oblast
- District: Gribanovsky District
- Time zone: UTC+3:00

Alexeyevka (Russian: Алексе́евка) is a rural locality (a selo) and the administrative center of Alexeyevskoye Rural Settlement, Gribanovsky District, Voronezh Oblast, Russia. The population was 492 as of 2010. There are 7 streets.

== Geography ==
Alexeyevka is located 19 km north of Gribanovsky (the district's administrative centre) by road. Mezhevikhin is the nearest rural locality.
