= Bobrov, Bryansk Oblast =

Bobrov Бобров
- Village
- Location within Bryansk Oblast Location within Russia
- Coordinates: 53°29′N 33°14′E
- Country: Russia
- Region: Bryansk Oblast
- District: Kletnyansky District
- Time zone: UTC+3:00

Bobrov (Russian: Бобров) is a rural locality (a village) in Kletnyansky District, Bryansk Oblast, Russia. The population was 2 as of 2010. There is 1 street.

== Geography ==
Bobrov is located 16 km north of Kletnya (the district's administrative centre) by road. Pavlinki is the nearest rural locality.
