= Alexeyevka, Kletnyansky District, Bryansk Oblast =

Alexeyevka Алексеевка
- Village
- Location within Bryansk Oblast Location within Russia
- Coordinates: 53°30′N 32°56′E
- Country: Russia
- Region: Bryansk Oblast
- District: Kletnyansky District
- Time zone: UTC+3:00

Alexeyevka (Russian: Алексеевка) is a rural locality (a village) in Kletnyansky District, Bryansk Oblast, Russia. The population was 245 as of 2013. There are 4 streets.
