= Alexeyevka, Blagovarsky District, Republic of Bashkortostan =

Alexeyevka Алексеевка
- Village
- Location within Bashkortostan Location within Russia
- Coordinates: 54°51′N 55°13′E
- Country: Russia
- Region: Bashkortostan
- District: Blagovarsky District
- Time zone: UTC+5:00

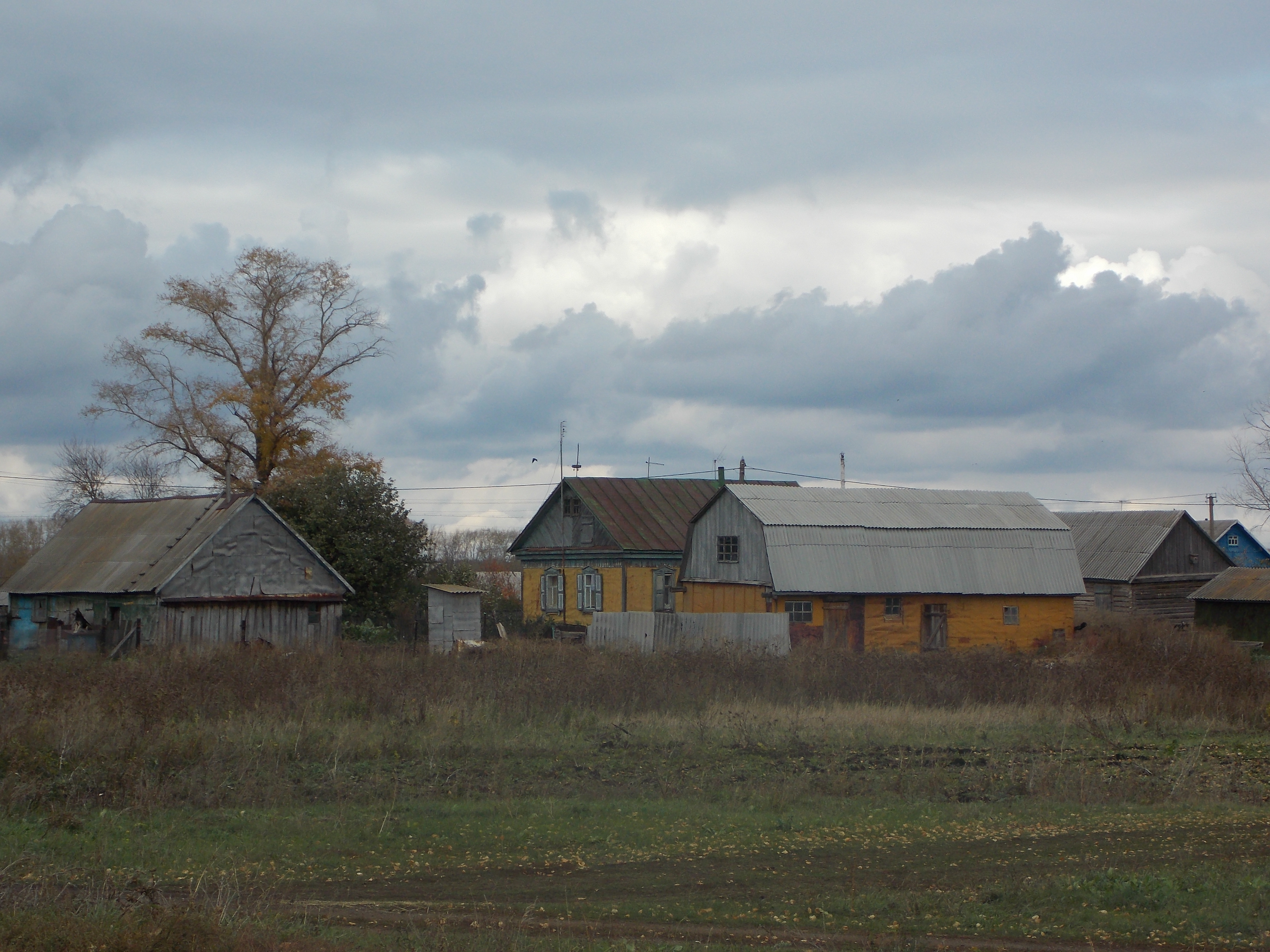
Alekseevka village, Blagovarsky district, Bashkiria

Alexeyevka (Russian: Алексеевка) is a rural locality (a village) in Alexeyevsky Selsoviet, Blagovarsky District, Bashkortostan, Russia. The population was 367 as of 2010. There are 3 streets.

== Geography ==
Alexeyevka is located 37 km northeast of Yazykovo (the district's administrative centre) by road. Novoakbashevo is the nearest rural locality.
