= Alexeyevskoye, Vladimir Oblast =

Alexeyevskoye Алексеевское
- Selo
- Location within Vladimir Oblast Location within Russia
- Coordinates: 56°06′N 41°33′E
- Country: Russia
- Region: Vladimir Oblast
- District: Kovrovsky District
- Time zone: UTC+3:00

Alexeyevskoye (Russian: Алексеевское) is a rural locality (a selo) in Ivanovskoye Rural Settlement, Kovrovsky District, Vladimir Oblast, Russia. The population was 47 as of 2010.

== Geography ==
Alexeyevskoye is located 42 km southeast of Kovrov (the district's administrative centre) by road. Otrub is the nearest rural locality.
