= Alexeyevka, Uglovsky District, Altai Krai =

Alexeyevka Алексеевка
- Selo
- Location within Altai Krai Location within Russia
- Coordinates: 51°22′N 79°42′E
- Country: Russia
- Region: Altai Krai
- District: Uglovsky District
- Time zone: UTC+7:00

Alexeyevka (Russian: Алексеевка) is a rural locality (a selo) in Pavlovsky Selsoviet, Uglovsky District, Altai Krai, Russia. The population was 176 as of 2013. It was founded in 1908. There are 5 streets.

== Geography ==
Alexeyevka is located 39 km west of Uglovskoye (the district's administrative centre) by road. Pavlovka is the nearest rural locality.
