= Alexeyevka, Yakovlevsky District, Belgorod Oblast =

Alexeyevka Алексеевка
- Selo
- Location within Belgorod Oblast Location within Russia
- Coordinates: 50°51′N 36°12′E
- Country: Russia
- Region: Belgorod Oblast
- District: Yakovlevsky District
- Time zone: UTC+3:00

Alexeyevka (Russian: Алексеевка) is a rural locality (a selo) and the administrative center of Alexeyevskoye Rural Settlement, Yakovlevsky District, Belgorod Oblast, Russia. The population was 1,057 as of 2010. There are 16 streets.

== Geography ==
Alexeyevka is located 27 km northwest of Stroitel (the district's administrative centre) by road. Krasnoye is the nearest rural locality.
