= Alexeyevka, Kumertau, Republic of Bashkortostan =

Alekseyevka Алексеевка
- Village
- Location within Bashkortostan Location within Russia
- Coordinates: 52°49′N 55°53′E
- Country: Russia
- Region: Bashkortostan
- District: Kumertau

Population (2010)
  - Total: 336
- Time zone: UTC+5:00

Alekseyevka (Russian: Алексеевка) is a rural locality (a village) in Kumertau, Bashkortostan, Russia. The population was 336 as of 2010. There are 6 streets.
