= Alexeyevka, Karmaskalinsky District, Republic of Bashkortostan =

Alexeyevka Алексеевка
- Village
- Location within Bashkortostan Location within Russia
- Coordinates: 54°23′N 56°14′E
- Country: Russia
- Region: Bashkortostan
- District: Karmaskalinsky District
- Time zone: UTC+5:00

Alexeyevka (Russian: Алексеевка) is a rural locality (a village) in Karmaskalinsky Selsoviet, Karmaskalinsky District, Bashkortostan, Russia. The population was 68 as of 2010. There is 1 street.

== Geography ==
Alexeyevka is located 8 km northeast of Karmaskaly (the district's administrative centre) by road. Ural is the nearest rural locality.
