= Alexeyevka, Mazanovsky District, Amur Oblast =

Alexeyevka Алексеевка
- Selo
- Location within Amur Oblast Location within Russia
- Coordinates: 51°26′N 128°46′E
- Country: Russia
- Region: Amur Oblast
- District: Mazanovsky District
- Time zone: UTC+9:00

Alexeyevka (Russian: Алексеевка) is a rural locality (a selo) in Sapronovsky Selsoviet of Mazanovsky District, Amur Oblast, Russia. The population was 36 as of 2018. There are 2 streets.

== Geography ==
Alexeyevka is located on the right bank of the Birma River, 33 km south of Novokiyevsky Uval (the district's administrative centre) by road. Sapronovo is the nearest rural locality.
