= Alexeyevskaya, Vinogradovsky District, Arkhangelsk Oblast =

Alexeyevskaya Алексеевская
- Village
- Location within Arkhangelsk Oblast Location within Russia
- Coordinates: 62°29′N 43°56′E
- Country: Russia
- Region: Arkhangelsk Oblast
- District: Vinogradovsky District
- Time zone: UTC+3:00

Alexeyevskaya (Russian: Алексеевская) is a rural locality (a village) in Boretskoye Rural Settlement of Vinogradovsky District, Arkhangelsk Oblast, Russia. The population was 11 as of 2010.

== Geography ==
Alexeyevskaya is located on the Tyoda River, 80 km southeast of Bereznik (the district's administrative centre) by road. Leushinskaya is the nearest rural locality.
