= Alexeyevka, Blagoveshchensky District, Altai Krai =

Alexeyevka Алексеевка
- Selo
- Location within Altai Krai Location within Russia
- Coordinates: 52°53′N 80°32′E
- Country: Russia
- Region: Altai Krai
- District: Blagoveshchensky District
- Time zone: UTC+7:00

Alexeyevka (Russian: Алексеевка) is a rural locality (a selo) and the administrative center of Alexeyevsky Selsoviet, Blagoveshchensky District, Altai Krai, Russia. The population was 347 as of 2013. There are 4 streets.

== Geography ==
Alexeyevka is located 56 km east of Blagoveshchenka (the district's administrative centre) by road. Alexandrovka is the nearest rural locality.
