= Alexeyevka, Aitovsky Selsoviet, Bizhbulyaksky District, Republic of Bashkortostan =

Alexeyevka Алексеевка
- Selo
- Location within Bashkortostan Location within Russia
- Coordinates: 53°32′N 54°05′E
- Country: Russia
- Region: Bashkortostan
- District: Bizhbulyaksky District
- Time zone: UTC+5:00

Alexeyevka (Russian: Алексеевка) is a rural locality (a selo) in Aitovsky Selsoviet, Bizhbulyaksky District, Bashkortostan, Russia. The population was 187 as of 2010.

== Geography ==
It is located 21 km from Bizhbulyak and 182 km from Ufa.
