= Alexeyevka, Volodarsky District, Astrakhan Oblast =

Alexeyevka Алексеевка
- Selo
- Location within Astrakhan Oblast Location within Russia
- Coordinates: 46°10′N 48°41′E
- Country: Russia
- Region: Astrakhan Oblast
- District: Volodarsky District
- Time zone: UTC+4:00

Alexeyevka (Russian: Алексеевка) is a rural locality (a selo) in Tsvetnovsky Selsoviet of Volodarsky District, Astrakhan Oblast, Russia. The population was 233 as of 2010. There are 6 streets.

== Geography ==
Alexeyevka is located 34 km (21 mi) south of Volodarsky (the district's administrative centre) by road. Zelyony Ostrov is the nearest rural locality.
