= Alexeyevka, Belebeyevsky District, Republic of Bashkortostan =

Alexeyevka Алексеевка
- Village
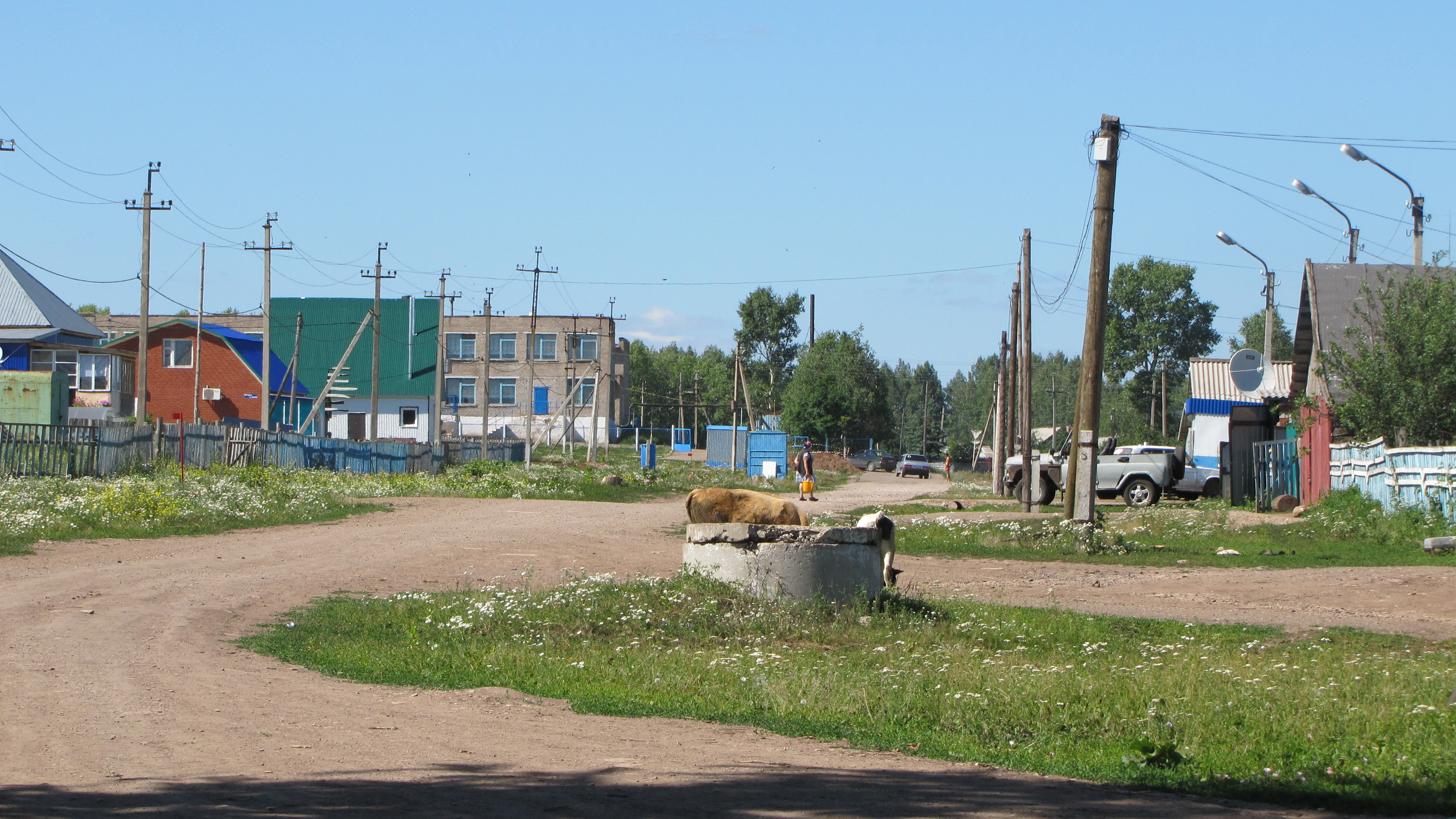

- Location within Bashkortostan Location within Russia
- Coordinates: 54°06′N 54°01′E
- Country: Russia
- Region: Bashkortostan
- District: Belebeyevsky District
- Time zone: UTC+5:00

Alexeyevka (Russian: Алексеевка) is a rural locality (a village) and the administrative centre of Rassvetovsky Selsoviet, Belebeyevsky District, Bashkortostan, Russia. The population was 575 as of 2010. There are 11 streets.

== Geography ==
Alexeyevka is located 6 km west of Belebey (the district's administrative centre) by road. Belebey is the nearest rural locality.
