= Alexeyevskaya, Plesetsky District, Arkhangelsk Oblast =

Alexeyevskaya Алексеевская
- Village
- Location within Arkhangelsk Oblast Location within Russia
- Coordinates: 62°48′N 41°10′E
- Country: Russia
- Region: Arkhangelsk Oblast
- District: Plesetsky District
- Time zone: UTC+3:00

Alexeyevskaya (Russian: Алексеевская) is a rural locality (a village) in Plesetsky District, Arkhangelsk Oblast, Russia. The population was 25 as of 2010.

== Geography ==
Alexeyevskaya is located 113 km east of Plesetsk (the district's administrative centre) by road. Podvolochye is the nearest rural locality.
