= Alexeyevka, Miyakinsky District, Republic of Bashkortostan =

Alexeyevka Алексеевка
- Village
- Location within Bashkortostan Location within Russia
- Coordinates: 53°43′N 54°45′E
- Country: Russia
- Region: Bashkortostan
- District: Miyakinsky District
- Time zone: UTC+5:00

Alexeyevka (Russian: Алексеевка) is a rural locality (a village) in Kozhay-Semyonovsky Selsoviet, Miyakinsky District, Bashkortostan, Russia. The population was 44 as of 2010. There is 1 street.

== Geography ==
Alexeyevka is located 13 km north of Kirgiz-Miyaki (the district's administrative centre) by road. Chayka is the nearest rural locality.
