= Alexeyevka, Bureysky District, Amur Oblast =

Alexeyevka Алексеевка
- Selo
- Location within Amur Oblast Location within Russia
- Coordinates: 49°33′N 129°27′E
- Country: Russia
- Region: Amur Oblast
- District: Bureysky District
- Time zone: UTC+9:00

Alexeyevka (Russian: Алексеевка) is a rural locality (a selo) and the administrative center of Alexeyevsky Selsoviet of Bureysky District, Amur Oblast, Russia. The population was 215 as of 2018. There are 7 streets.

== Geography ==
Alexeyevka is located 65 km southwest of Novobureysky (the district's administrative centre) by road. Astashikha is the nearest rural locality.
