= Alexeyevskaya, Syamzhensky District, Vologda Oblast =

Alexeyevskaya Алексеевская
- Village
- Location within Vologda Oblast Location within Russia
- Coordinates: 59°53′N 41°03′E
- Country: Russia
- Region: Vologda Oblast
- District: Syamzhensky District
- Time zone: UTC+3:00

Alexeyevskaya (Russian: Алексеевская) is a rural locality (a village) in Zhityovskoye Rural Settlement, Syamzhensky District, Vologda Oblast, Russia. The population was 8 as of 2002.

== Geography ==
Alexeyevskaya is located 24 km south of Syamzha (the district's administrative centre) by road. Zalesye is the nearest rural locality.
