= Alexeyevka, Perm Krai =

Alexeyevka Алексеевка
- Village
- Location within Perm Krai Location within Russia
- Coordinates: 59°04′N 54°51′E
- Country: Russia
- Region: Perm Krai
- District: Kudymkarsky District
- Time zone: UTC+5:00

Alexeyevka (Russian: Алексеевка) is a rural locality (a village) in Yorgvinskoye Rural Settlement, Kudymkarsky District, Perm Krai, Russia. The population was 25 as of 2010.

== Geography ==
Alexeyevka is located 20 km northeast of Kudymkar (the district's administrative centre) by road. Derskanova is the nearest rural locality.
