= Alexeyevka, Kamyzyaksky District, Astrakhan Oblast =

Alexeyevka Алексеевка
- Selo
- Location within Astrakhan Oblast Location within Russia
- Coordinates: 45°56′N 47°52′E
- Country: Russia
- Region: Astrakhan Oblast
- District: Kamyzyaksky District
- Time zone: UTC+4:00

Alexeyevka (Russian: Алексеевка) is a rural locality (a selo) in Samosdelsky Selsoviet, Kamyzyaksky District, Astrakhan Oblast, Russia. The population was 201 as of 2010. There are three streets.

== Geography ==
Alexeyevka is located 38 km southwest of Kamyzyak (the district's administrative centre) by road. Arshin is the nearest rural locality.
