= Alexeyevka, Korochansky District, Belgorod Oblast =

Alexeyevka Алексеевка
- Selo
- Location within Belgorod Oblast Location within Russia
- Coordinates: 50°45′N 37°02′E
- Country: Russia
- Region: Belgorod Oblast
- District: Korochansky District
- Time zone: UTC+3:00

Alexeyevka (Russian: Алексеевка) is a rural locality (a selo) and the administrative center of Alexeyevskoye Rural Settlement, Korochansky District, Belgorod Oblast, Russia. The population was 2,259 as of 2010. There are 13 streets.

== Geography ==
Alexeyevka is located 13 km southwest of Korocha (the district's administrative centre) by road. Mazikino is the nearest rural locality.
