= Alexeyevskoye, Republic of Bashkortostan =

Alexeyevskoye Алексеевское
- Village
- Location within Bashkortostan Location within Russia
- Coordinates: 54°32′N 56°50′E
- Country: Russia
- Region: Bashkortostan
- District: Arkhangelsky District
- Time zone: UTC+5:00

Alexeyevskoye (Russian: Алексеевское) is a rural locality (a village) in Inzersky Selsoviet, Arkhangelsky District, Bashkortostan, Russia. The population was 20 as of 2010. There is 1 street.

== Geography ==
Alexeyevskoye is located 18 km north of Arkhangelskoye (the district's administrative centre) by road. Valentinovka is the nearest rural locality.
