= Alexeyevskoye, Chagodoshchensky District, Vologda Oblast =

Alexeyevskoye Алексеевское
- Village
- Location within Vologda Oblast Location within Russia
- Coordinates: 59°05′N 35°20′E
- Country: Russia
- Region: Vologda Oblast
- District: Chagodoshchensky District
- Time zone: UTC+3:00

Alexeyevskoye (Russian: Алексеевское) is a rural locality (a village) in Belokrestskoye Rural Settlement, Chagodoshchensky District, Vologda Oblast, Russia. The population was 5 as of 2002.

== Geography ==
Alexeyevskoye is located 18 km (11 mi) south of Chagoda, the district's administrative centre, by road. Paport is the nearest rural locality.
