= Alexeyevka, Zeysky District, Amur Oblast =

Alexeyevka Алексеевка
- Selo
- Location within Amur Oblast Location within Russia
- Coordinates: 53°32′N 127°00′E
- Country: Russia
- Region: Amur Oblast
- District: Zeysky District
- Time zone: UTC+9:00

Alexeyevka (Russian: Алексеевка) is a rural locality (a selo) in Nikolayevsky Selsoviet of Zeysky District, Amur Oblast, Russia. The population was 1 as of 2018. There is 1 street.

== Geography ==
Alexeyevka is located 39 km southwest of Zeya (the district's administrative centre) by road. Nikolayevka is the nearest rural locality.
