= Alexeyevka, Tuymazinsky District, Republic of Bashkortostan =

Alexeyevka Алексеевка
- Selo
- Location within Bashkortostan Location within Russia
- Coordinates: 54°23′N 54°14′E
- Country: Russia
- Region: Bashkortostan
- District: Tuymazinsky District
- Time zone: UTC+5:00

Alexeyevka (Russian: Алексеевка) is a rural locality (a selo) and the administrative centre of Chukadybashevsky Selsoviet, Tuymazinsky District, Bashkortostan, Russia. The population was 257 as of 2010. There are 6 streets.

== Geography ==
Alexeyevka is located 56 km southeast of Tuymazy (the district's administrative centre) by road. Imyan-Kuper is the nearest rural locality.
