= Alexeyevka, Semenkinsky Selsoviet, Aurgazinsky District, Republic of Bashkortostan =

Alexeyevka Алексеевка
- Village
- Location within Bashkortostan Location within Russia
- Coordinates: 53°53′N 55°35′E
- Country: Russia
- Region: Bashkortostan
- District: Aurgazinsky District
- Time zone: UTC+5:00

Alexeyevka (Russian: Алексеевка) is a rural locality (a village) in Semyonkinsky Selsoviet, Aurgazinsky District, Bashkortostan, Russia. The population was 16 as of 2010. There is 1 street.

== Geography ==
It is located 27 km from Tolbazy.
