= Alekseyevka, Volokonovsky District, Belgorod Oblast =

Alekseyevka Алексеевка
- Settlement
- Location within Belgorod Oblast Location within Russia
- Coordinates: 50°31′N 37°36′E
- Country: Russia
- Region: Belgorod Oblast
- District: Volokonovsky District
- Time zone: UTC+3:00

Alekseyevka (Russian: Алексеевка) is a rural locality (a settlement) in Volokonovsky District, Belgorod Oblast, Russia. The population was 79 as of 2010. There are 2 streets.

== Geography ==
Alexeyevka is located 26 km northwest of Volokonovka (the district's administrative centre) by road. Novy is the nearest rural locality.
