= Kletnyansky District =

Kletnyansky District Клетнянский район (Russian)
- District
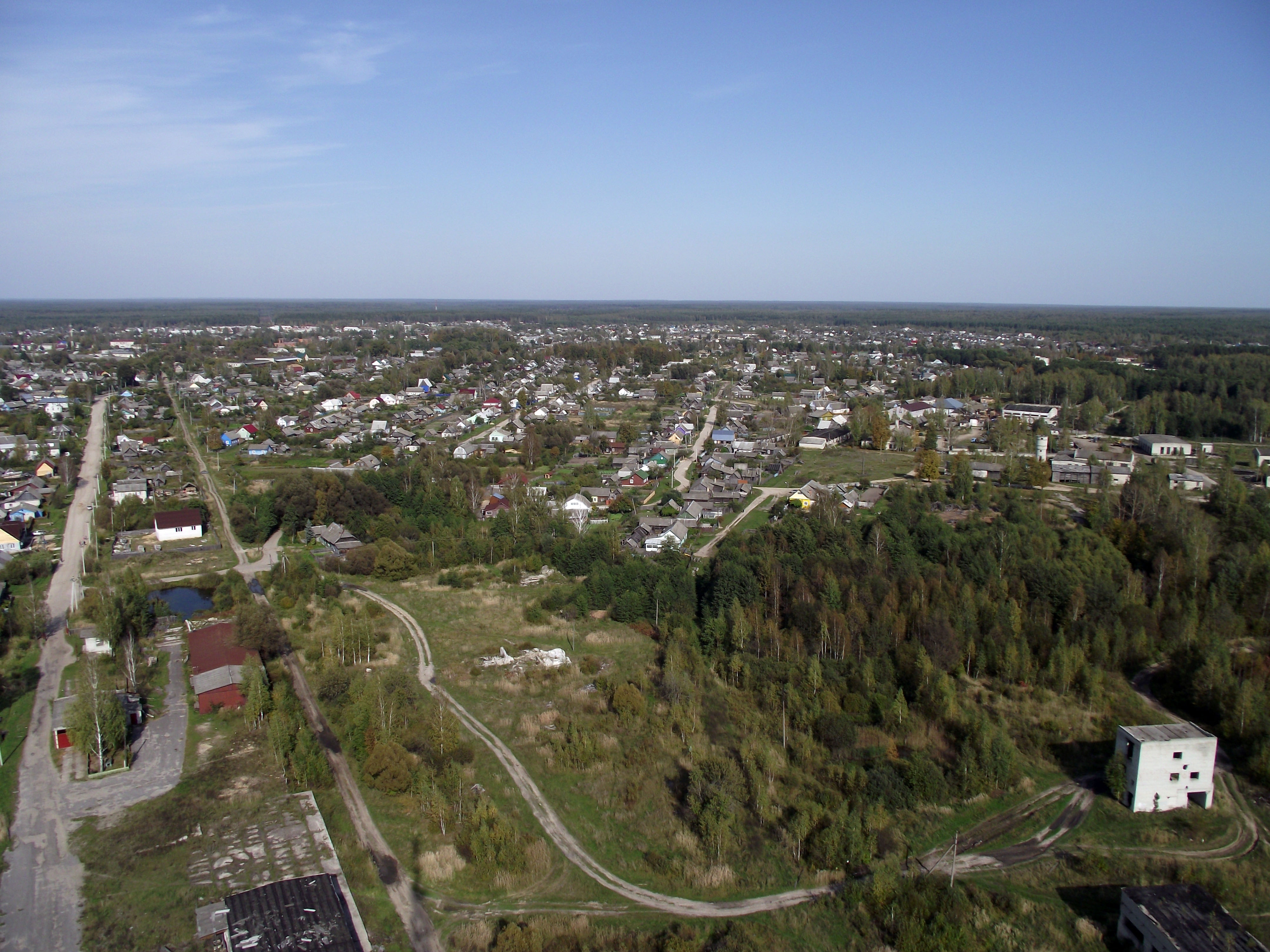
- View of Kletnya

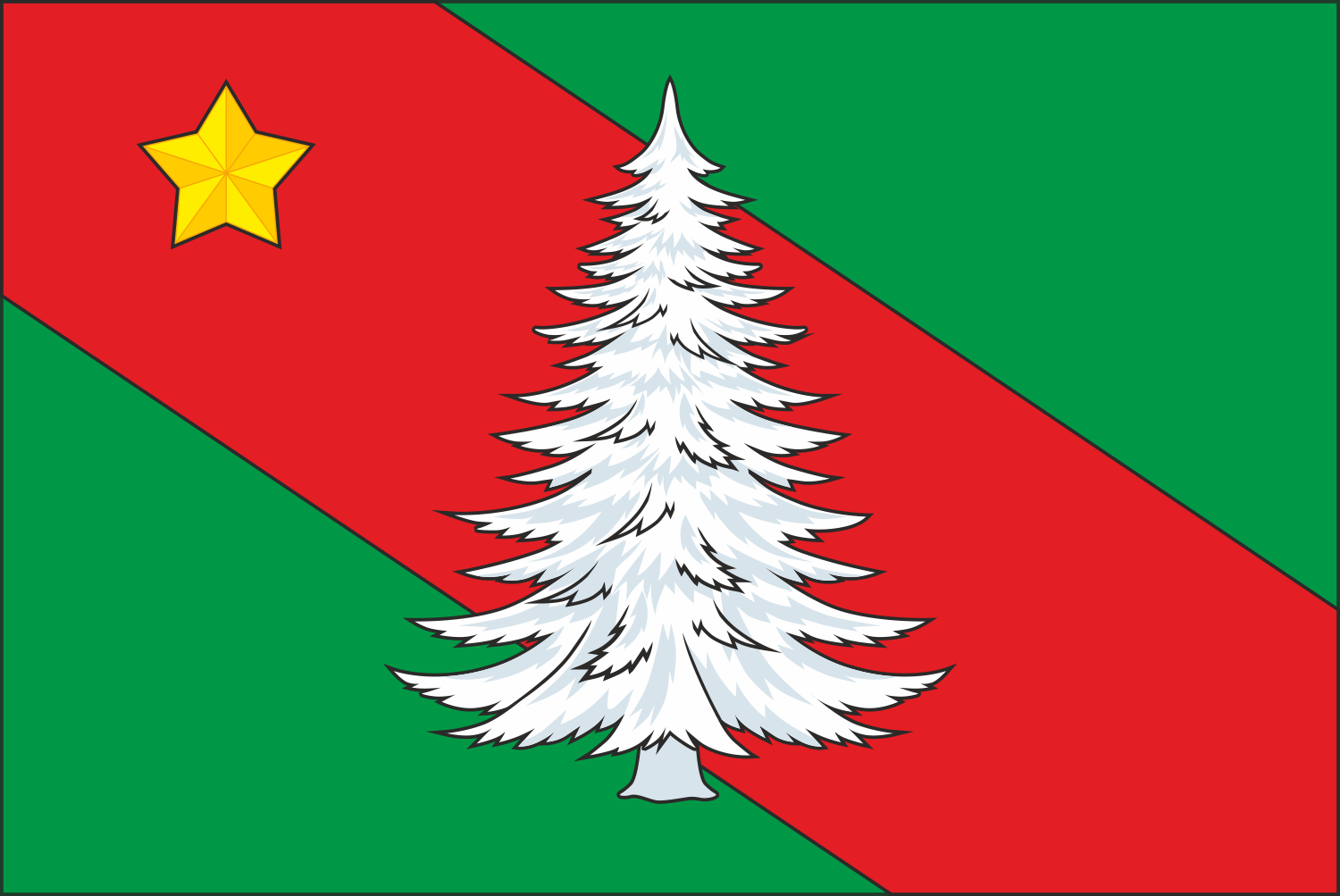
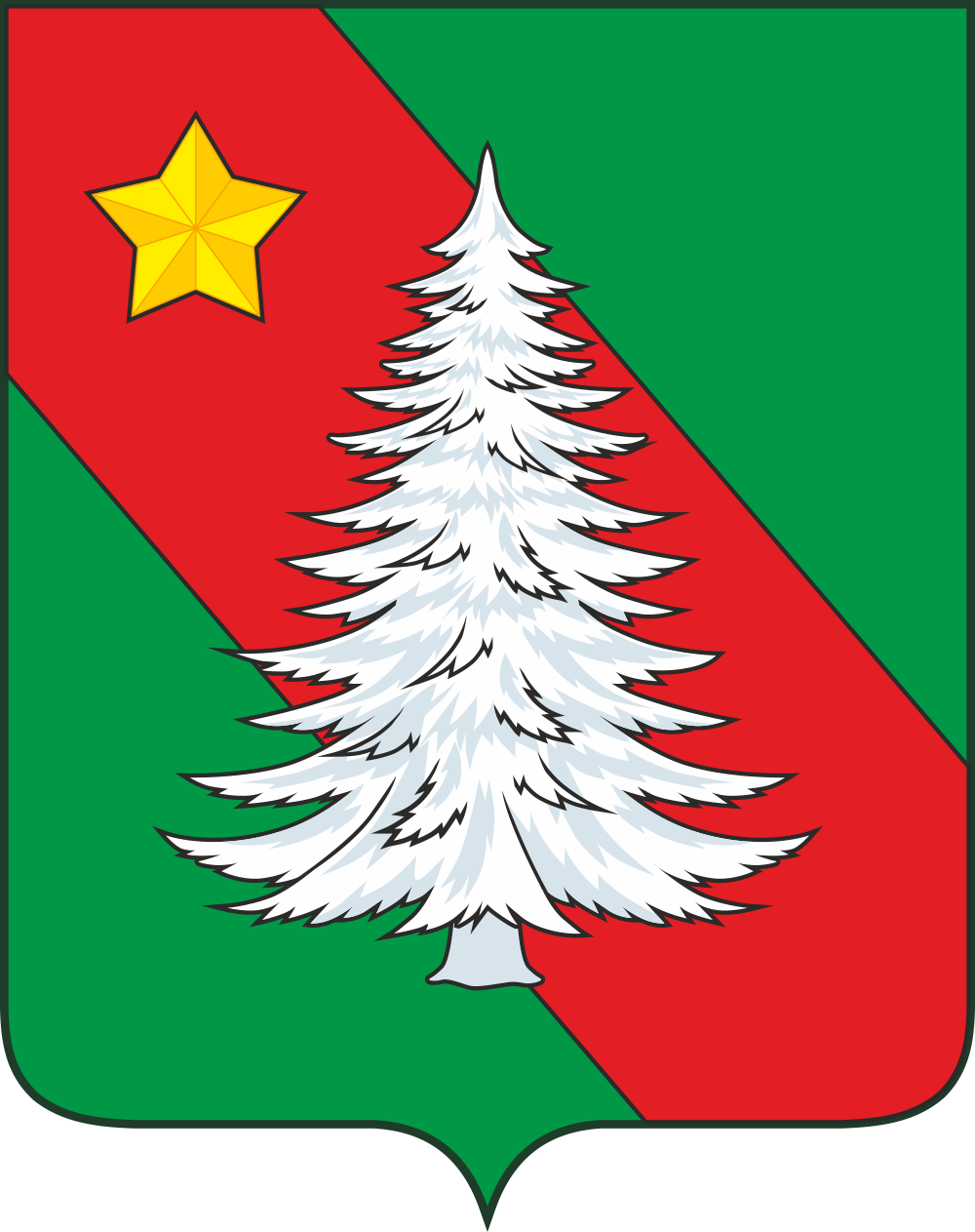
- Flag Coat of arms
- Location of Kletnyansky District in Bryansk Oblast
- Coordinates: 53°23′23″N 33°13′11″E
- Country: Russia
- Federal subject: Bryansk Oblast
- Established: 1929
- Administrative center: Kletnya

Area
  - Total: 1,583 km^{2} (611 sq mi)

Population (2010 Census)
  - Total: 20,166
  - Density: 12.74/km^{2} (32.99/sq mi)
  - Urban: 66.0%
  - Rural: 34.0%

Administrative structure
  - Administrative divisions: 1 Settlement administrative okrugs, 5 Rural administrative okrugs
  - Inhabited localities: 1 urban-type settlements, 92 rural localities

Municipal structure
  - Municipally incorporated as: Kletnyansky Municipal District
  - Municipal divisions: 1 urban settlements, 5 rural settlements
- Time zone: UTC+3 (MSK)
- OKTMO ID: 15626000
- Website: http://adm-kletnya.ru/

Kletnyansky District (Russian: Клетня́нский райо́н) is an administrative and municipal district (raion), one of the twenty-seven in Bryansk Oblast, Russia. It is located in the northwest of the oblast. The area of the district is 1,583 square kilometers (611 sq mi). Its administrative center is the urban locality (a work settlement) of Kletnya. Population: 17,032 (2021 census); 20,166 (2010 census); 22,501 (2002 Census); 23,885 (1989 Soviet census). The population of Kletnya accounts for 70.1% of the district's total population.
