= Gribanovsky (urban-type settlement) =

Gribanovsky Грибановский
- "urban-type settlement"
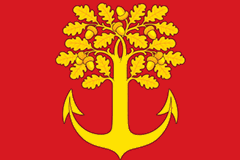
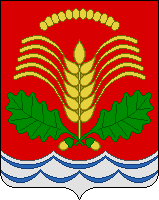
- Flag Coat of arms
- Interactive map of Gribanovsky
- Location of Gribanovsky Gribanovsky (Voronezh Oblast)
- Coordinates: 51°27′N 41°58′E
- Country: Russia
- Federal subject: Voronezh Oblast
- Administrative district: Gribanovsky District
- Founded: 1703

Population (2010 Census)
  - Total: 15,686
  - Estimate (2025): 14,485 (−7.7%)

Administrative status
  - Capital of: Gribanovsky District
- Time zone: UTC+3 (MSK)
- Postal code: 397240–397243
- OKTMO ID: 20613151051

Gribanovsky (Russian: Гриба́новский) is an urban locality (an urban-type settlement) and the administrative center of Gribanovsky District of Voronezh Oblast, Russia. Population: 14,830 (2021 census); 15,686 (2010 census); 17,461 (2002 census); 17,122 (1989 Soviet census).

== History ==
It was founded in 1703 as the village of Bolshaya Gribanovka in the Tambov district, and later the village was a part of Borisoglebsky Uyezd of Tambov Governorate. In 1728 it was owned by Prince Menshikov. At the end of the 18th century, the wooden Epiphany Church was built, and in 1899 it was rebuilt into a stone church. In 1860, a sugar factory was built near the village. In 1869 a railway station was built. Since 1957 Gribanovkahas held the status of urban-type settlement.
