= Gribanovsky District =

Gribanovsky District Грибановский район (Russian)
- District
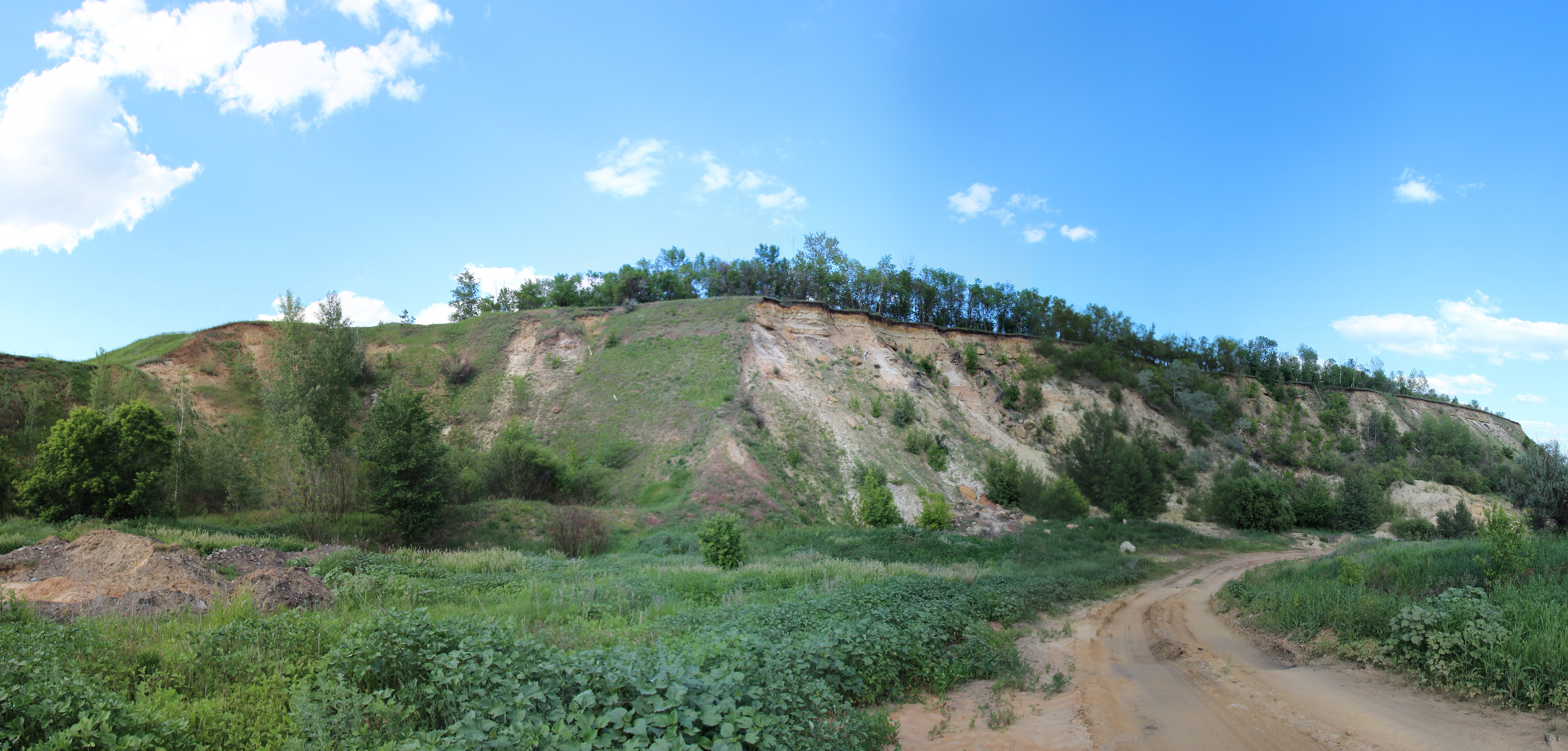
- Upper Karachan Outcrop, Gribanovsky District

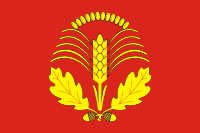
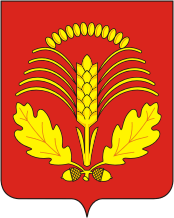
- Flag Coat of arms
- Location of Gribanovsky District in Voronezh Oblast
- Coordinates: 51°27′N 41°58′E
- Country: Russia
- Federal subject: Voronezh Oblast
- Established: 1935
- Administrative center: Gribanovsky

Area
  - Total: 2,016 km^{2} (778 sq mi)

Population (2010 Census)
  - Total: 33,073
  - Density: 16.41/km^{2} (42.49/sq mi)
  - Urban: 47.4%
  - Rural: 52.6%

Administrative structure
  - Administrative divisions: 1 Urban settlements, 16 Rural settlements
  - Inhabited localities: 1 urban-type settlements, 43 rural localities

Municipal structure
  - Municipally incorporated as: Gribanovsky Municipal District
  - Municipal divisions: 1 urban settlements, 16 rural settlements
- Time zone: UTC+3 (MSK)
- OKTMO ID: 20613000
- Website: http://admingribanovka.itcvo.ru/

Gribanovsky District (Russian: Гриба́новский райо́н) is an administrative and municipal district (raion), one of the thirty-two in Voronezh Oblast, Russia. It is located in the northeast of the oblast. The area of the district is 2,016 square kilometers (778 sq mi). Its administrative center is the urban locality (an urban-type settlement) of Gribanovsky. Population: 28,871 (2021 census); 33,073 (2010 census); 39,648 (2002 census); 42,735 (1989 Soviet census). The population of the administrative center accounts for 51.4% of the district's total population.
