= Blagovarsky District =

Blagovarsky District Благоварский район (Russian)
- District

Other transcription(s)
  - Bashkir: Благовар районы
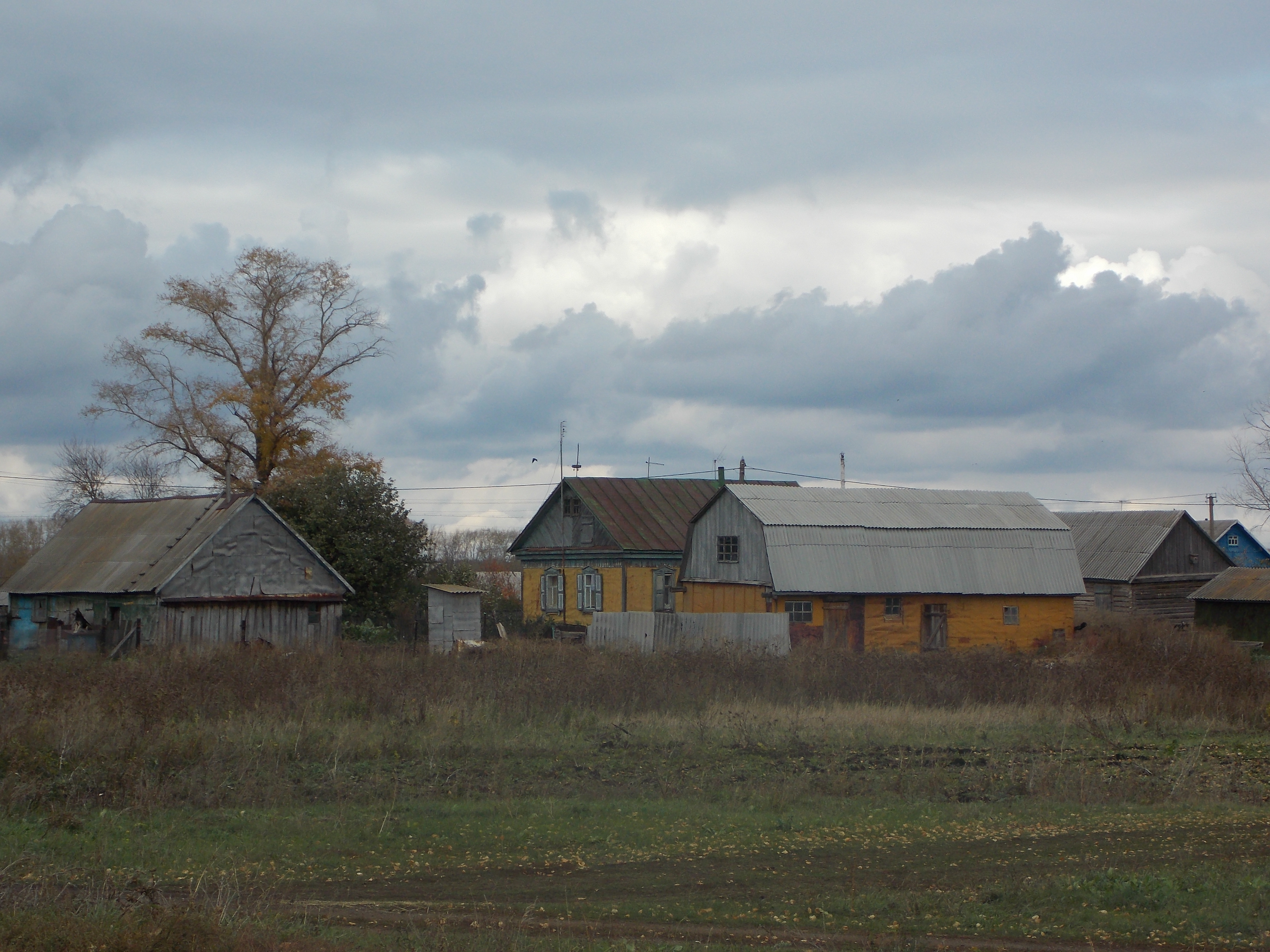
- The village of Alexeyevka in Blagovarsky District

- Flag Coat of arms
- Location of Blagovarsky District in the Republic of Bashkortostan
- Coordinates: 54°42′N 55°01′E
- Country: Russia
- Federal subject: Republic of Bashkortostan
- Established: 1935
- Administrative center: Yazykovo

Area
  - Total: 1,688.15 km^{2} (651.80 sq mi)

Population (2010 Census)
  - Total: 26,004
  - Density: 15.404/km^{2} (39.896/sq mi)
  - Urban: 0%
  - Rural: 100%

Administrative structure
  - Administrative divisions: 15 Selsoviets
  - Inhabited localities: 87 rural localities

Municipal structure
  - Municipally incorporated as: Blagovarsky Municipal District
  - Municipal divisions: 0 urban settlements, 15 rural settlements
- Time zone: UTC+5 (MSK+2)
- OKTMO ID: 80614000
- Website: https://blagovar.bashkortostan.ru/

Population of Blagovarsky District
- 2010 Census: 26,004
- 2002 Census: 25,770
- 1989 Census: 24,341
- 1979 Census: 26,244

Blagovarsky District (Russian: Благова́рский райо́н; Bashkir: Благовар районы, Blagovar rayonı; Tatar: Болгавар районы, Bolğawar rayonı) is an administrative and municipal district (raion), one of the fifty-four in the Republic of Bashkortostan, Russia. It is located in the central western part of the republic and borders with Chekmagushevsky District in the north, Kushnarenkovsky District in the northeast, Chishminsky District in the east, Davlekanovsky District in the south, and with Buzdyaksky District in the west. The area of the district is 1,688.15 square kilometers (651.80 sq mi). Its administrative center is the rural locality (a selo) of Yazykovo. As of the 2010 Census, the total population of the district was 26,004, with the population of Yazykovo accounting for 24.5% of that number.

== History ==
The district was established in 1935.

== Administrative and municipal status ==
Within the framework of administrative divisions, Blagovarsky District is one of the fifty-four in the Republic of Bashkortostan. The district is divided into fifteen selsoviets, comprising eighty-seven rural localities. As a municipal division, the district is incorporated as Blagovarsky Municipal District. Its fifteen selsoviets are incorporated as fifteen rural settlements within the municipal district. The selo of Yazykovo serves as the administrative center of both the administrative and municipal district.
