= Yazykovo, Blagovarsky District, Republic of Bashkortostan =

Rural locality in Bashkortostan, Russia

Yazykovo Языково
- Selo

Other transcription(s)
  - Bashkir: Языков
- Interactive map of Yazykovo
- Location of Yazykovo Yazykovo (Bashkortostan)
- Coordinates: 54°41′24″N 55°00′55″E
- Country: Russia
- Federal subject: Bashkortostan
- Administrative district: Blagovarsky District
- SelsovietSelsoviet: Yazykovsky Selsoviet

Population (2010 Census)
  - Total: 6,368
  - Estimate (2010): 6,368 (0%)

Administrative status
  - Capital of: Blagovarsky District, Yazykovsky Selsoviet

Municipal status
  - Municipal district: Blagovarsky Municipal District
  - Rural settlement: Yazykovsky Selsoviet Rural Settlement
  - Capital of: Blagovarsky Municipal District, Yazykovsky Selsoviet Rural Settlement
- Time zone: UTC+5 (MSK+2)
- Postal code: 452740
- OKTMO ID: 80614437101

Yazykovo (Russian: Язы́ково, Bashkir: Языков) is a rural locality (a selo) and the administrative center of Blagovarsky District of the Republic of Bashkortostan, Russia. Population: 6,368 (2010 census); 5,918 (2002 census); 4,665 (1989 Soviet census).
