= Bikkulovo =

Bikkulovo may refer to the following rural localities in Russia:

- Bikkulovo, Abzelilovsky District, Republic of Bashkortostan
- Bikkulovo, Bizhbulyaksky District, Republic of Bashkortostan
- Bikkulovo, Chishminsky District, Republic of Bashkortostan
- Bikkulovo, Miyakinsky District, Republic of Bashkortostan
- Bikkulovo, Sharansky District, Republic of Bashkortostan
