= Shomyrtly =

Shomyrtly Шомыртлы
- Village
- Location within Bashkortostan Location within Russia
- Coordinates: 53°44′N 53°48′E
- Country: Russia
- Region: Bashkortostan
- District: Bizhbulyaksky District
- Time zone: UTC+5:00

Shomyrtly (Russian: Шомыртлы; Bashkir: Шомортло, Şomortlo) is a rural locality (a village) in Sukhorechensky Selsoviet, Bizhbulyaksky District, Bashkortostan, Russia. The population was 3 as of 2010. There is 1 street.

== Geography ==
Shomyrtly is located 43 km west of Bizhbulyak (the district's administrative centre) by road. Isyakayevo is the nearest rural locality.
