= Khomutovka =

Khomutovka (Russian: Хомутовка) is the name of several inhabited localities in Russia.

Urban localities

- Khomutovka, Kursk Oblast, a work settlement in Khomutovsky District of Kursk Oblast

Rural localities

- Khomutovka, Republic of Bashkortostan, a village in Demsky Selsoviet of Bizhbulyaksky District of the Republic of Bashkortostan
- Khomutovka, Bryansk Oblast, a village in Mishkovsky Selsoviet of Starodubsky District of Bryansk Oblast
- Khomutovka, Sverdlovsk Oblast, a village under the administrative jurisdiction of the City of Pervouralsk, Sverdlovsk Oblast
- Khomutovka, Kimovsky District, Tula Oblast, a village in Pokrovsky Rural Okrug of Kimovsky District of Tula Oblast
- Khomutovka, Leninsky District, Tula Oblast, a village in Varfolomeyevsky Rural Okrug of Leninsky District of Tula Oblast
- Khomutovka, Tyoplo-Ogaryovsky District, Tula Oblast, a village in Gorkovsky Rural Okrug of Tyoplo-Ogaryovsky District of Tula Oblast
- Khomutovka, Voronezh Oblast, a selo in Novogolyelanskoye Rural Settlement of Gribanovsky District of Voronezh Oblast
