= Churayevo, Miyakinsky District, Republic of Bashkortostan =

Churayevo Чураево
- Village
- Location within Bashkortostan Location within Russia
- Coordinates: 53°41′N 54°34′E
- Country: Russia
- Region: Bashkortostan
- District: Miyakinsky District
- Time zone: UTC+5:00

Churayevo (Russian: Чураево; Bashkir: Сурай, Suray) is a rural locality (a village) in Meneuztamaksky Selsoviet, Miyakinsky District, Bashkortostan, Russia. The population was 130 as of 2010. There are 3 streets.

== Geography ==
Churayevo is located 26 km northwest of Kirgiz-Miyaki (the district's administrative centre) by road. Meneuztamak is the nearest rural locality.
