= Uspekh, Republic of Bashkortostan =

Uspekh Успех
- Village
- Location within Bashkortostan Location within Russia
- Coordinates: 53°22′N 54°39′E
- Country: Russia
- Region: Bashkortostan
- District: Miyakinsky District
- Time zone: UTC+5:00

Uspekh (Russian: Успех) is a rural locality (a village) in Zildyarovsky Selsoviet, Miyakinsky District, Bashkortostan, Russia. The population was 55 as of 2010. There are 2 streets.

== Geography ==
Uspekh is located 42 km southwest of Kirgiz-Miyaki (the district's administrative centre) by road. Chiyale is the nearest rural locality.
