= Rodnikovka, Republic of Bashkortostan =

Rodnikovka Родниковка
- Selo
- Location within Bashkortostan Location within Russia
- Coordinates: 53°35′N 54°48′E
- Country: Russia
- Region: Bashkortostan
- District: Miyakinsky District
- Time zone: UTC+5:00

Rodnikovka (Russian: Родниковка) is a rural locality (a selo) in Miyakinsky Selsoviet, Miyakinsky District, Bashkortostan, Russia. The population was 841 as of 2010. There are 10 streets.

== Geography ==
Rodnikovka is located 5 km south of Kirgiz-Miyaki (the district's administrative centre) by road. Kirgiz-Miyaki is the nearest rural locality.
