= Usak-Kichu =

Usak-Kichu Усак-Кичу
- Selo
- Location within Bashkortostan Location within Russia
- Coordinates: 53°48′N 54°25′E
- Country: Russia
- Region: Bashkortostan
- District: Bizhbulyaksky District
- Time zone: UTC+5:00

Usak-Kichu (Russian: Усак-Кичу; Bashkir: Уҫаҡкисеү, Uśaqkisew) is a rural locality (a selo) and the administrative centre of Kalininsky Selsoviet, Bizhbulyaksky District, Bashkortostan, Russia. The population was 767 as of 2010. There are 9 streets.

== Geography ==
Usak-Kichu is located 25 km northeast of Bizhbulyak (the district's administrative centre) by road. Ittikhat is the nearest rural locality.
