= Nizhnyaya Kurmaza =

Nizhnyaya Kurmaza Нижняя Курмаза
- Village
- Location within Bashkortostan Location within Russia
- Coordinates: 53°35′N 54°17′E
- Country: Russia
- Region: Bashkortostan
- District: Bizhbulyaksky District
- Time zone: UTC+5:00

Nizhnyaya Kurmaza (Russian: Нижняя Курмаза; Bashkir: Түбәнге Көрмәҙе, Tübänge Körmäźe) is a rural locality (a village) in Yelbulaktamaksky Selsoviet, Bizhbulyaksky District, Bashkortostan, Russia. The population was 17 as of 2010. There is 1 street.

== Geography ==
Nizhnyaya Kurmaza is located 19 km south of Bizhbulyak (the district's administrative centre) by road. Antonovka is the nearest rural locality.
