= Bayazitovo, Miyakinsky District, Republic of Bashkortostan =

Bayazitovo Баязитово
- Selo
- Location within Bashkortostan Location within Russia
- Coordinates: 53°27′N 54°45′E
- Country: Russia
- Region: Bashkortostan
- District: Miyakinsky District
- Time zone: UTC+5:00

Bayazitovo (Russian: Баязитово; Bashkir: Баязит, Bayazit) is a rural locality (a selo) in Satyyevsky Selsoviet, Miyakinsky District, Bashkortostan, Russia. The population was 640 as of 2010. There are 12 streets.

== Geography ==
Bayazitovo is located 24 km south of Kirgiz-Miyaki (the district's administrative centre) by road. Satyevo is the nearest rural locality.
