= Abishevo =

Abishevo Абишево Әбеш Äbeş
- Village
- Location within Bashkortostan Location within Russia
- Coordinates: 53°48′N 54°33′E
- Country: Russia
- Region: Bashkortostan
- District: Miyakinsky District
- Time zone: [[UTC+5:00]]

Abishevo (Russian: Абишево; Bashkir: Әбеш, Äbeş) is a rural locality (a village) in Bikkulovsky Selsoviet of Miyakinsky District, Bashkortostan, Russia. The population was 78 as of 2010. There are 3 streets.

== Geography ==
Abishevo is located 34 km north of Kirgiz-Miyaki (the district's administrative centre) by road. Kul-Kunkas is the nearest rural locality.

== Ethnicity ==
The village is inhabited by Bashkirs and others.
