= Milisonovka =

Milisonovka Милисоновка
- Village
- Location within Bashkortostan Location within Russia
- Coordinates: 53°46′N 54°01′E
- Country: Russia
- Region: Bashkortostan
- District: Bizhbulyaksky District
- Time zone: UTC+5:00

Milisonovka (Russian: Милисоновка) is a rural locality (a village) in Sukhorechensky Selsoviet, Bizhbulyaksky District, Bashkortostan, Russia. The population was 2 as of 2010. There is 1 street.

== Geography ==
Milisonovka is located 25 km northwest of Bizhbulyak (the district's administrative centre) by road. Sukhorechka is the nearest rural locality.
