= Maly Meneuz =

Maly Meneuz Малый Менеуз
- Selo
- Location within Bashkortostan Location within Russia
- Coordinates: 53°58′N 54°11′E
- Country: Russia
- Region: Bashkortostan
- District: Bizhbulyaksky District
- Time zone: UTC+5:00

Maly Meneuz (Russian: Малый Менеуз; Bashkir: Кесе Мәнәүез, Kese Mänäwez) is a rural locality (a selo) in Mikhaylovsky Selsoviet, Bizhbulyaksky District, Bashkortostan, Russia. The population was 180 as of 2010. There are 3 streets.

== Geography ==
Maly Meneuz is located 44 km north of Bizhbulyak (the district's administrative centre) by road. Svetlovka is the nearest rural locality.
