= Bolshiye Karkaly =

Bolshiye Karkaly Большие Каркалы
- Selo
- Location within Bashkortostan Location within Russia
- Coordinates: 53°29′N 55°00′E
- Country: Russia
- Region: Bashkortostan
- District: Miyakinsky District
- Time zone: UTC+5:00

Bolshiye Karkaly (Russian: Большие Каркалы; Bashkir: Оло Кәркәле, Olo Kärkäle) is a rural locality (a selo) and the administrative centre of Bolshekarkalinksy Selsoviet, Miyakinsky District, Bashkortostan, Russia. The population was 488 as of 2010. There are 6 streets.

== Geography ==
Bolshiye Karkaly is located 29 km southeast of Kirgiz-Miyaki (the district's administrative centre) by road. Kamyshly is the nearest rural locality.
