= Novyye Karmaly =

Novyye Karmaly Новые Карамалы
- Selo
- Location within Bashkortostan Location within Russia
- Coordinates: 53°39′N 54°42′E
- Country: Russia
- Region: Bashkortostan
- District: Miyakinsky District
- Time zone: UTC+5:00

Novyye Karmaly (Russian: Новые Карамалы; Bashkir: Яңы Ҡарамалы, Yañı Qaramalı) is a rural locality (a selo) and the administrative centre of Novokarmalinsky Selsoviet, Miyakinsky District, Bashkortostan, Russia. The population was 576 as of 2010. There are 3 streets.

== Geography ==
Novyye Karmaly is located 10 km northwest of Kirgiz-Miyaki (the district's administrative centre) by road. Sukkul-Mikhaylovka is the nearest rural locality.
