= Umanka =

Umanka Уманка
- Village
- Location within Bashkortostan Location within Russia
- Coordinates: 53°29′N 54°53′E
- Country: Russia
- Region: Bashkortostan
- District: Miyakinsky District
- Time zone: UTC+5:00

Umanka (Russian: Уманка) is a rural locality (a village) in Kacheganovsky Selsoviet, Miyakinsky District, Bashkortostan, Russia. The population was 22 as of 2010. There is 1 street.

== Geography ==
Umanka is located 23 km south of Kirgiz-Miyaki (the district's administrative centre) by road. Kacheganovo is the nearest rural locality.
