= Karan-Kunkas =

Karan-Kunkas Каран-Кункас
- Selo
- Location within Bashkortostan Location within Russia
- Coordinates: 53°46′N 54°55′E
- Country: Russia
- Region: Bashkortostan
- District: Miyakinsky District
- Time zone: UTC+5:00

Karan-Kunkas (Russian: Каран-Кункас; Bashkir: Ҡаран-Ҡуңҡаҫ, Qaran-Quñqaś) is a rural locality (a selo) and the administrative centre of Karanovsky Selsoviet, Miyakinsky District, Bashkortostan, Russia. The population was 407 as of 2010. There are 7 streets.

== Geography ==
Karan-Kunkas is located 32 km northeast of Kirgiz-Miyaki (the district's administrative centre) by road. Kul-Kunkas is the nearest rural locality.
