= Malyye Gayny =

Malyye Gayny Малые Гайны
- Village
- Location within Bashkortostan Location within Russia
- Coordinates: 53°45′N 54°36′E
- Country: Russia
- Region: Bashkortostan
- District: Miyakinsky District
- Time zone: UTC+5:00

Malyye Gayny (Russian: Малые Гайны; Bashkir: Кесе Гәйнә, Kese Gäynä) is a rural locality (a village) in Kozhay-Semyonovsky Selsoviet, Miyakinsky District, Bashkortostan, Russia. The population was 62 as of 2010. There is 1 street.

== Geography ==
Malyye Gayny is located 28 km northwest of Kirgiz-Miyaki (the district's administrative centre) by road. Aytugan is the nearest rural locality.
