= Karimovo =

Karimovo Каримово
- Village
- Location within Bashkortostan Location within Russia
- Coordinates: 53°33′N 54°09′E
- Country: Russia
- Region: Bashkortostan
- District: Bizhbulyaksky District
- Time zone: UTC+5:00

Karimovo (Russian: Каримово; Bashkir: Кәрим, Kärim) is a rural locality (a village) in Aitovsky Selsoviet, Bizhbulyaksky District, Bashkortostan, Russia. The population was 116 as of 2010. There are 4 streets.

== Geography ==
Karimovo is located 23 km southwest of Bizhbulyak (the district's administrative centre) by road. Aitovo is the nearest rural locality.
