= Kenger-Meneuz =

Kenger-Meneuz Кенгер-Менеуз
- Village
- Location within Bashkortostan Location within Russia
- Coordinates: 53°40′N 54°24′E
- Country: Russia
- Region: Bashkortostan
- District: Bizhbulyaksky District
- Time zone: UTC+5:00

Kenger-Meneuz (Russian: Кенгер-Менеуз; Bashkir: Ҡыңғыр-Мәнәүез, Qıñğır-Mänäwez) is a rural locality (a village) and the administrative centre of Kenger-Meneuzovsky Selsoviet, Bizhbulyaksky District, Bashkortostan, Russia. The population was 1,323 as of 2010. There are 9 streets.

== Geography ==
Kenger-Meneuz is located 10 km east of Bizhbulyak (the district's administrative centre) by road. Chulpan is the nearest rural locality.
