= Zildyarovo =

Zildyarovo Зильдярово
- Selo
- Location within Bashkortostan Location within Russia
- Coordinates: 53°25′N 54°37′E
- Country: Russia
- Region: Bashkortostan
- District: Miyakinsky District
- Time zone: UTC+5:00

Zildyarovo (Russian: Зильдярово; Bashkir: Елдәр, Yeldär) is a rural locality (a selo) and the administrative centre of Zildyarovsky Selsoviet, Miyakinsky District, Bashkortostan, Russia. The population was 890 as of 2010. There are 11 streets.

== Geography ==
Zildyarovo is located 34 km southwest of Kirgiz-Miyaki (the district's administrative centre) by road. Shatmantamak is the nearest rural locality.
