= Tuyash =

Tuyash Туяш
- Village
- Location within Bashkortostan Location within Russia
- Coordinates: 53°42′N 54°45′E
- Country: Russia
- Region: Bashkortostan
- District: Miyakinsky District
- Time zone: UTC+5:00

Tuyash (Russian: Туяш; Bashkir: Туйыш, Tuyış) is a rural locality (a village) in Kozhay-Semyonovsky Selsoviet, Miyakinsky District, Bashkortostan, Russia. The population was 24 as of 2010. There is 1 street.

== Geography ==
Tuyash is located 13 km north of Kirgiz-Miyaki (the district's administrative centre) by road. Chayka is the nearest rural locality.
