= Kistenli-Bogdanovo =

Kistenli-Bogdanovo Кистенли-Богданово
- Selo
- Location within Bashkortostan Location within Russia
- Coordinates: 53°48′N 54°16′E
- Country: Russia
- Region: Bashkortostan
- District: Bizhbulyaksky District
- Time zone: UTC+5:00

Kistenli-Bogdanovo (Russian: Кистенли-Богданово; Bashkir: Киҫтәнле-Боғҙан, Kiśtänle-Boğźan) is a rural locality (a selo) in Bazlyksky Selsoviet, Bizhbulyaksky District, Bashkortostan, Russia. The population was 483 as of 2010. There are 10 streets.

== Geography ==
Kistenli-Bogdanovo is located 17 km north of Bizhbulyak (the district's administrative centre) by road. Petrovka is the nearest rural locality.
