= Ziriklykul =

Ziriklykul Зириклыкуль
- Village
- Location within Bashkortostan Location within Russia
- Coordinates: 53°34′N 54°31′E
- Country: Russia
- Region: Bashkortostan
- District: Miyakinsky District
- Time zone: UTC+5:00

Ziriklykul (Russian: Зириклыкуль; Bashkir: Ереклекүл, Yereklekül) is a rural locality (a village) in Bogdanovsky Selsoviet, Miyakinsky District, Bashkortostan, Russia. The population was 71 as of 2010. There are 4 streets.

== Geography ==
Ziriklykul is located 29 km southwest of Kirgiz-Miyaki (the district's administrative centre) by road. Tamyan-Taymas is the nearest rural locality.
