= Uyazybashevo =

Uyazybashevo Уязыбашево
- Selo
- Location within Bashkortostan Location within Russia
- Coordinates: 53°33′N 55°03′E
- Country: Russia
- Region: Bashkortostan
- District: Miyakinsky District
- Time zone: UTC+5:00

Uyazybashevo (Russian: Уязыбашево; Bashkir: Өйәҙебаш, Öyäźebaş) is a rural locality (a selo) in Bolshekarkalinksy Selsoviet, Miyakinsky District, Bashkortostan, Russia. The population was 423 as of 2010. There are 4 streets.

== Geography ==
Uyazybashevo is located 21 km southeast of Kirgiz-Miyaki (the district's administrative centre) by road. Dubrovka is the nearest rural locality.
