= Ittikhat =

Ittikhat Иттихат
- Village
- Location within Bashkortostan Location within Russia
- Coordinates: 53°47′N 54°25′E
- Country: Russia
- Region: Bashkortostan
- District: Bizhbulyaksky District
- Time zone: UTC+5:00

Ittikhat (Russian: Иттихат; Bashkir: Иттихат, İttixat) is a rural locality (a village) in Kalininsky Selsoviet, Bizhbulyaksky District, Bashkortostan, Russia. The population was 284 as of 2010. There are 3 streets.

== Geography ==
Ittikhat is located 28 km northeast of Bizhbulyak (the district's administrative centre) by road. Usak-Kichu is the nearest rural locality.
