= Miyakitamak =

Miyakitamak Миякитамак
- Selo
- Location within Bashkortostan Location within Russia
- Coordinates: 53°47′N 54°44′E
- Country: Russia
- Region: Bashkortostan
- District: Miyakinsky District
- Time zone: UTC+5:00

Miyakitamak (Russian: Миякитамак; Bashkir: Миәкәтамаҡ, Miäkätamaq) is a rural locality (a selo) in Kozhay-Semyonovsky Selsoviet, Miyakinsky District, Bashkortostan, Russia. The population was 675 as of 2010. There are 5 streets.

== Geography ==
Miyakitamak is located 20 km north of Kirgiz-Miyaki (the district's administrative centre) by road. Starye Balgazy is the nearest rural locality.
