= Kanbekovo =

Kanbekovo Канбеково
- Selo
- Location within Bashkortostan Location within Russia
- Coordinates: 53°39′N 54°34′E
- Country: Russia
- Region: Bashkortostan
- District: Miyakinsky District
- Time zone: UTC+5:00

Kanbekovo (Russian: Канбеково; Bashkir: Ҡанбәк, Qanbäk) is a rural locality (a selo) in Bogdanovsky Selsoviet, Miyakinsky District, Bashkortostan, Russia. The population was 483 as of 2010. There are 5 streets.

== Geography ==
Kanbekovo is located 18 km northwest of Kirgiz-Miyaki (the district's administrative centre) by road. Chiryashtamak is the nearest rural locality.
