= Staryye Balgazi =

Staryye Balgazi Старые Балгазы
- Village
- Location within Bashkortostan Location within Russia
- Coordinates: 53°45′N 54°45′E
- Country: Russia
- Region: Bashkortostan
- District: Miyakinsky District
- Time zone: UTC+5:00

Staryye Balgazi (Russian: Старые Балгазы; Bashkir: Иҫке Балғажы, İśke Balğajı) is a rural locality (a village) in Kozhay-Semyonovsky Selsoviet, Miyakinsky District, Bashkortostan, Russia. The population was 71 as of 2010. There is 1 street.

== Geography ==
Staryye Balgazi is located 17 km north of Kirgiz-Miyaki (the district's administrative centre) by road. Kozhay-Semyonovka and Miyakitamak are the nearest rural localities.
