= Churayevo =

Churayevo may refer to the following rural localities in Russia:

- Churayevo, Alsheyevsky District, Republic of Bashkortostan
- Churayevo, Mishkinsky District, Republic of Bashkortostan
- Churayevo, Miyakinsky District, Republic of Bashkortostan
- Churayevo, Belgorod Oblast
