= Ziriklytamak =

Ziriklytamak Зириклытамак
- Village
- Location within Bashkortostan Location within Russia
- Coordinates: 53°53′N 54°15′E
- Country: Russia
- Region: Bashkortostan
- District: Bizhbulyaksky District
- Time zone: UTC+5:00

Ziriklytamak (Russian: Зириклытамак; Bashkir: Ереклетамаҡ, Yerekletamaq) is a rural locality (a village) in Kosh-Yelginsky Selsoviet, Bizhbulyaksky District, Bashkortostan, Russia. The population was 64 as of 2010. There is 1 street.

== Geography ==
Ziriklytamak is located 44 km north of Bizhbulyak (the district's administrative centre) by road. Kosh-Yelga is the nearest rural locality.
