= Rudniki, Republic of Bashkortostan =

Rudniki Рудники
- Village
- Location within Bashkortostan Location within Russia
- Coordinates: 53°51′N 54°23′E
- Country: Russia
- Region: Bashkortostan
- District: Bizhbulyaksky District
- Time zone: UTC+5:00

Rudniki (Russian: Рудники) is a rural locality (a village) in Kalininsky Selsoviet, Bizhbulyaksky District, Bashkortostan, Russia. The population was 3 as of 2010. There is 1 street.

== Geography ==
Rudniki is located 28 km northeast of Bizhbulyak (the district's administrative centre) by road. Tumash is the nearest rural locality.
