= Yermolkino, Bizhbulyaksky District, Republic of Bashkortostan =

Yermolkino Ермолкино
- Selo
- Location within Bashkortostan Location within Russia
- Coordinates: 53°49′N 54°21′E
- Country: Russia
- Region: Bashkortostan
- District: Bizhbulyaksky District
- Time zone: UTC+5:00

Yermolkino (Russian: Ермолкино) is a rural locality (a selo) in Kalininsky Selsoviet, Bizhbulyaksky District, Bashkortostan, Russia. The population was 354 as of 2010. There are 3 streets.

== Geography ==
Yermolkino is located 20 km northeast of Bizhbulyak (the district's administrative centre) by road. Petrovka is the nearest rural locality.
