= Yenebey-Ursayevo =

Yenebey-Ursayevo Енебей-Урсаево
- Selo
- Location within Bashkortostan Location within Russia
- Coordinates: 53°37′N 54°30′E
- Country: Russia
- Region: Bashkortostan
- District: Miyakinsky District
- Time zone: UTC+5:00

Yenebey-Ursayevo (Russian: Енебей-Урсаево; Bashkir: Йәнәби-Урсай, Yänäbi-Ursay) is a rural locality (a selo) and the administrative centre of Yenebey-Ursayevsky Selsoviet, Miyakinsky District, Bashkortostan, Russia. The population was 285 as of 2010. There are 9 streets.

== Geography ==
Yenebey-Ursayevo is located 28 km west of Kirgiz-Miyaki (the district's administrative centre) by road. Bogdanovo is the nearest rural locality.
