= Tukay, Republic of Bashkortostan =

Tukay Тукай
- Village
- Location within Bashkortostan Location within Russia
- Coordinates: 53°34′N 54°11′E
- Country: Russia
- Region: Bashkortostan
- District: Bizhbulyaksky District
- Time zone: UTC+5:00

Tukay (Russian: Тукай; Bashkir: Туҡай, Tuqay) is a rural locality (a village) in Yelbulaktamaksky Selsoviet, Bizhbulyaksky District, Bashkortostan, Russia. The population was 123 as of 2010. There is 1 street.

== Geography ==
Tukay is located 17 km southwest of Bizhbulyak (the district's administrative centre) by road. Karimovo is the nearest rural locality.
