= Taukay-Gayna =

Taukay-Gayna Таукай-Гайна
- Selo
- Location within Bashkortostan Location within Russia
- Coordinates: 53°27′N 54°57′E
- Country: Russia
- Region: Bashkortostan
- District: Miyakinsky District
- Time zone: UTC+5:00

Taukay-Gayna (Russian: Таукай-Гайна; Bashkir: Тауҡай-Ғәйнә, Tawqay-Ğäynä) is a rural locality (a selo) in Kacheganovsky Selsoviet, Miyakinsky District, Bashkortostan, Russia. The population was 156 as of 2010. There are 4 streets.

== Geography ==
Taukay-Gayna is located 27 km southeast of Kirgiz-Miyaki (the district's administrative centre) by road. Kacheganovo is the nearest rural locality.
