= Islamgulovo, Miyakinsky District, Republic of Bashkortostan =

Islamgulovo Исламгулово
- Village
- Location within Bashkortostan Location within Russia
- Coordinates: 53°26′N 54°28′E
- Country: Russia
- Region: Bashkortostan
- District: Miyakinsky District
- Time zone: UTC+5:00

Islamgulovo (Russian: Исламгулово; Bashkir: Исламғол, İslamğol) is a rural locality (a village) in Zildyarovsky Selsoviet, Miyakinsky District, Bashkortostan, Russia. The population was 205 as of 2010. There are 6 streets.

== Geography ==
Islamgulovo is located 44 km southwest of Kirgiz-Miyaki (the district's administrative centre) by road. Karyshevo is the nearest rural locality.
