= Bazlyk =

Bazlyk Базлык
- Selo
- Location within Bashkortostan Location within Russia
- Coordinates: 53°45′N 54°16′E
- Country: Russia
- Region: Bashkortostan
- District: Bizhbulyaksky District
- Time zone: UTC+5:00

Bazlyk (Russian: Базлык; Bashkir: Баҙлыҡ, Baźlıq) is a rural locality (a selo) in and the administrative centre of Bazlyksky Selsoviet, Bizhbulyaksky District, Bashkortostan, Russia. The population was 916 as of 2010. There are 11 streets.

== Geography ==
Bazlyk is located 8 km north of Bizhbulyak (the district's administrative centre) by road. Yegorovka is the nearest rural locality.
