= Novaya Samarka =

Novaya Samarka Новая Самарка
- Village
- Location within Bashkortostan Location within Russia
- Coordinates: 53°36′N 54°07′E
- Country: Russia
- Region: Bashkortostan
- District: Bizhbulyaksky District
- Time zone: UTC+5:00

Novaya Samarka (Russian: Новая Самарка; Bashkir: Яңы Һамар, Yañı Hamar) is a rural locality (a village) in Ziriklinsky Selsoviet, Bizhbulyaksky District, Bashkortostan, Russia. The population was six as of 2010. There is one street.

== Geography ==
Novaya Samarka is located 17 km southwest of Bizhbulyak (the district's administrative centre) by road. Zirikly is the nearest rural locality.
