= Dyomsky =

Dyomsky Дёмский
- Selo
- Location within Bashkortostan Location within Russia
- Coordinates: 53°32′N 54°27′E
- Country: Russia
- Region: Bashkortostan
- District: Bizhbulyaksky District
- Time zone: UTC+5:00

Dyomsky (Russian: Дёмский; Bashkir: Дим, Dim) is a rural locality (a selo) and the administrative centre of Dyomsky Selsoviet, Bizhbulyaksky District, Bashkortostan, Russia. The population was 1,028 as of 2010. There are 11 streets.

== Geography ==
Dyomsky is located 24 km southeast of Bizhbulyak (the district's administrative centre) by road. Tuksanbayevo is the nearest rural locality.
