= Novyye Ishly =

Novyye Ishly Новые Ишлы
- Selo
- Location within Bashkortostan Location within Russia
- Coordinates: 53°29′N 54°50′E
- Country: Russia
- Region: Bashkortostan
- District: Miyakinsky District
- Time zone: UTC+5:00

Novyye Ishly (Russian: Новые Ишлы; Bashkir: Яңы Ишле, Yañı İşle) is a rural locality (a selo) in Kacheganovsky Selsoviet, Miyakinsky District, Bashkortostan, Russia. The population was 467 as of 2010. There are 8 streets.

== Geography ==
Novyye Ishly is located 18 km south of Kirgiz-Miyaki (the district's administrative centre) by road. Kacheganovo is the nearest rural locality.
