= Urnyak, Miyakinsky District, Republic of Bashkortostan =

Urnyak Урняк
- Village
- Location within Bashkortostan Location within Russia
- Coordinates: 53°37′N 54°54′E
- Country: Russia
- Region: Bashkortostan
- District: Miyakinsky District
- Time zone: UTC+5:00

Urnyak (Russian: Урняк; Bashkir: Үрнәк, Ürnäk) is a rural locality (a village) in Miyakibashevsky Selsoviet, Miyakinsky District, Bashkortostan, Russia. The population was 89 as of 2010. There are 3 streets.

== Geography ==
Urnyak is located 11 km east of Kirgiz-Miyaki (the district's administrative centre) by road. Nikolskoye is the nearest rural locality.
