= Lassirma =

Lassirma Лассирма
- Village
- Location within Bashkortostan Location within Russia
- Coordinates: 53°39′N 54°14′E
- Country: Russia
- Region: Bashkortostan
- District: Bizhbulyaksky District
- Time zone: UTC+5:00

Lassirma (Russian: Лассирма) is a rural locality (a village) in Bizhbulyaksky Selsoviet, Bizhbulyaksky District, Bashkortostan, Russia. The population was 17 as of 2010. There is 1 street.

== Geography ==
Lassirma is located 12 km southwest of Bizhbulyak (the district's administrative centre) by road. Pchelnik is the nearest rural locality.
