= Purlyga =

Purlyga Пурлыга
- Village
- Location within Bashkortostan Location within Russia
- Coordinates: 53°47′N 54°22′E
- Country: Russia
- Region: Bashkortostan
- District: Bizhbulyaksky District
- Time zone: UTC+5:00

Purlyga (Russian: Пурлыга; Bashkir: Пурлыға, Purlığa) is a rural locality (a village) in Bazlyksky Selsoviet, Bizhbulyaksky District, Bashkortostan, Russia. The population was 67 as of 2010. There is 1 street.

== Geography ==
Purlyga is located 16 km northeast of Bizhbulyak (the district's administrative centre) by road. Ittikhat is the nearest rural locality.
