= Maly Sedyak =

Maly Sedyak Малый Седяк
- Selo
- Location within Bashkortostan Location within Russia
- Coordinates: 53°39′N 54°05′E
- Country: Russia
- Region: Bashkortostan
- District: Bizhbulyaksky District
- Time zone: UTC+5:00

Maly Sedyak (Russian: Малый Седяк; Bashkir: Бәләкәй Сиҙәк, Bäläkäy Siźäk) is a rural locality (a selo) in Ziriklinsky Selsoviet, Bizhbulyaksky District, Bashkortostan, Russia. The population was 505 as of 2010. There are 3 streets.

== Geography ==
Maly Sedyak is located 18 km west of Bizhbulyak (the district's administrative centre) by road. Zirikly is the nearest rural locality.
