= Yerlykovo =

Yerlykovo Ерлыково
- Selo
- Location within Bashkortostan Location within Russia
- Coordinates: 53°36′N 54°50′E
- Country: Russia
- Region: Bashkortostan
- District: Miyakinsky District
- Time zone: UTC+5:00

Yerlykovo (Russian: Ерлыково; Bashkir: Йәрлекәү, Yärlekäw) is a rural locality (a selo) in Miyakinsky Selsoviet, Miyakinsky District, Bashkortostan, Russia. The population was 499 as of 2010. There are 6 streets.

== Geography ==
Yerlykovo is located 3 km southeast of Kirgiz-Miyaki (the district's administrative centre) by road. Kirgiz-Miyaki is the nearest rural locality.
