= Kacheganovo =

Kacheganovo Качеганово
- Selo
- Location within Bashkortostan Location within Russia
- Coordinates: 53°27′N 54°52′E
- Country: Russia
- Region: Bashkortostan
- District: Miyakinsky District
- Time zone: UTC+5:00

Kacheganovo (Russian: Качеганово; Bashkir: Көсөгән, Kösögän) is a rural locality (a selo) and the administrative centre of Kacheganovsky Selsoviet, Miyakinsky District, Bashkortostan, Russia. The population was 558 as of 2010. There are 12 streets.

== Geography ==
Kacheganovo is located 21 km south of Kirgiz-Miyaki (the district's administrative centre) by road. Umanka is the nearest rural locality.
