= Kyzyl-Chishma, Miyakinsky District, Republic of Bashkortostan =

Kyzyl-Chishma Кызыл-Чишма
- Village
- Location within Bashkortostan Location within Russia
- Coordinates: 53°39′N 54°45′E
- Country: Russia
- Region: Bashkortostan
- District: Miyakinsky District
- Time zone: UTC+5:00

Kyzyl-Chishma (Russian: Кызыл-Чишма; Bashkir: Ҡыҙыл Шишмә, Qıźıl Şişmä) is a rural locality (a village) in Miyakinsky Selsoviet, Miyakinsky District, Bashkortostan, Russia. The population was 178 as of 2010. There are two streets.

== Geography ==
Kyzyl-Chishma is located 5 km northwest of Kirgiz-Miyaki (the district's administrative centre) by road. Kirgiz-Miyaki is the nearest rural locality.
