= Shatmantamak =

Shatmantamak Шатмантамак
- Selo
- Location within Bashkortostan Location within Russia
- Coordinates: 53°26′N 54°34′E
- Country: Russia
- Region: Bashkortostan
- District: Miyakinsky District
- Time zone: UTC+5:00

Shatmantamak (Russian: Шатмантамак; Bashkir: Шатмантамаҡ, Şatmantamaq) is a rural locality (a selo) in Zildyarovsky Selsoviet, Miyakinsky District, Bashkortostan, Russia. The population was 528 as of 2010. There are 7 streets.

== Geography ==
Shatmantamak is located 38 km southwest of Kirgiz-Miyaki (the district's administrative centre) by road. Yashelkul is the nearest rural locality.
