= Svetlovka, Bizhbulyaksky District, Republic of Bashkortostan =

Svetlovka Светловка
- Village
- Location within Bashkortostan Location within Russia
- Coordinates: 53°58′N 54°08′E
- Country: Russia
- Region: Bashkortostan
- District: Bizhbulyaksky District
- Time zone: UTC+5:00

Svetlovka (Russian: Светловка) is a rural locality (a village) in Mikhaylovsky Selsoviet, Bizhbulyaksky District, Bashkortostan, Russia. The population was 9 as of 2010. There is 1 street.

== Geography ==
Svetlovka is located 46 km north of Bizhbulyak (the district's administrative centre) by road. Brik-Alga is the nearest rural locality.
