= Tamyan-Taymas =

Tamyan-Taymas Тамьян-Таймас
- Selo
- Location within Bashkortostan Location within Russia
- Coordinates: 53°35′N 54°33′E
- Country: Russia
- Region: Bashkortostan
- District: Miyakinsky District
- Time zone: UTC+5:00

Tamyan-Taymas (Russian: Тамьян-Таймас; Bashkir: Тамъян-Таймаҫ, Tamyan-Taymaś) is a rural locality (a selo) in Bogdanovsky Selsoviet, Miyakinsky District, Bashkortostan, Russia. The population was 516 as of 2010. There are 7 streets.

== Geography ==
Tamyan-Taymas is located 27 km west of Kirgiz-Miyaki (the district's administrative centre) by road. Ziriklykul is the nearest rural locality.
