= Novy Mir, Miyakinsky District, Republic of Bashkortostan =

Novy Mir Новый Мир
- Village
- Location within Bashkortostan Location within Russia
- Coordinates: 53°41′N 55°03′E
- Country: Russia
- Region: Bashkortostan
- District: Miyakinsky District
- Time zone: UTC+5:00

Novy Mir (Russian: Новый Мир) is a rural locality (a village) in Miyakibashevsky Selsoviet, Miyakinsky District, Bashkortostan, Russia. The population was 304 as of 2010. There are 6 streets.

== Geography ==
Novy Mir is located 24 km northeast of Kirgiz-Miyaki (the district's administrative centre) by road. Nikolayevka is the nearest rural locality.
