= Muradymovo =

Muradymovo Мурадымово
- Village
- Location within Bashkortostan Location within Russia
- Coordinates: 53°43′N 53°53′E
- Country: Russia
- Region: Bashkortostan
- District: Bizhbulyaksky District
- Time zone: UTC+5:00

Muradymovo (Russian: Мурадымово; Bashkir: Мораҙым, Moraźım) is a rural locality (a village) in Sukhorechensky Selsoviet, Bizhbulyaksky District, Bashkortostan, Russia. The population was 198 as of 2010. There are 4 streets.

== Geography ==
Muradymovo is located 35 km west of Bizhbulyak (the district's administrative centre) by road. Novy Biktyash is the nearest rural locality.
