= Sukhorechka =

Sukhorechka Сухоречка
- Selo
- Location within Bashkortostan Location within Russia
- Coordinates: 53°44′N 53°59′E
- Country: Russia
- Region: Bashkortostan
- District: Bizhbulyaksky District
- Time zone: UTC+5:00

Sukhorechka (Russian: Сухоречка) is a rural locality (a selo) and the administrative centre of Sukhorechensky Selsoviet, Bizhbulyaksky District, Bashkortostan, Russia. The population was 775 as of 2010. There are 7 streets.

== Geography ==
Sukhorechka is located 30 km northwest of Bizhbulyak (the district's administrative centre) by road. Novy Biktyash is the nearest rural locality.
