= Timyashevo =

Timyashevo Тимяшево
- Village
- Location within Bashkortostan Location within Russia
- Coordinates: 53°21′N 54°35′E
- Country: Russia
- Region: Bashkortostan
- District: Miyakinsky District

Area
  - Total: 0.14 km^{2} (0.054 sq mi)

Population (2010)
  - Total: 64
  - Density: 460/km^{2} (1,200/sq mi)
- Time zone: UTC+5:00

Timyashevo (Russian: Тимяшево; Bashkir: Тимәш, Timäş) is a rural locality (a village) in Zildyarovsky Selsoviet, Miyakinsky District, Bashkortostan, Russia. The population was 64 as of 2010. There is 1 street.

== Geography ==
Timyashevo is located 41 km southwest of Kirgiz-Miyaki (the district's administrative centre) by road. Chiyale is the nearest rural locality.
