= 2nd Miyakibashevo =

2nd Miyakibashevo 2-е Миякибашево 2-се Миәкәбаш 2-se Miäkäbaş
- Village
- Location within Bashkortostan Location within Russia
- Coordinates: 53.693333°N 54.955°E
- Country: Russia
- Region: Bashkortostan
- District: Miyakinsky District
- Time zone: UTC+05:00

2nd Miyakibashevo (Russian: 2-е Миякибашево; Bashkir: 2-се Миәкәбаш, 2-se Miäkäbaş) is a rural locality (a village) in Miyakibashevsky Selsoviet of Miyakinsky District, Russia. The population was 56 as of 2010.

== Geography ==
2nd Miyakibashevo is located 20 km northeast of Kirgiz-Miyaki (the district's administrative centre) by road. Mayak is the nearest rural locality.

== Ethnicity ==
The village is inhabited by Bashkirs and other.

== Streets ==
- Tsentralnaya
