= Mullanur-Bakhitovo =

Mullanur-Bakhitovo Мулланур-Вахитово
- Village
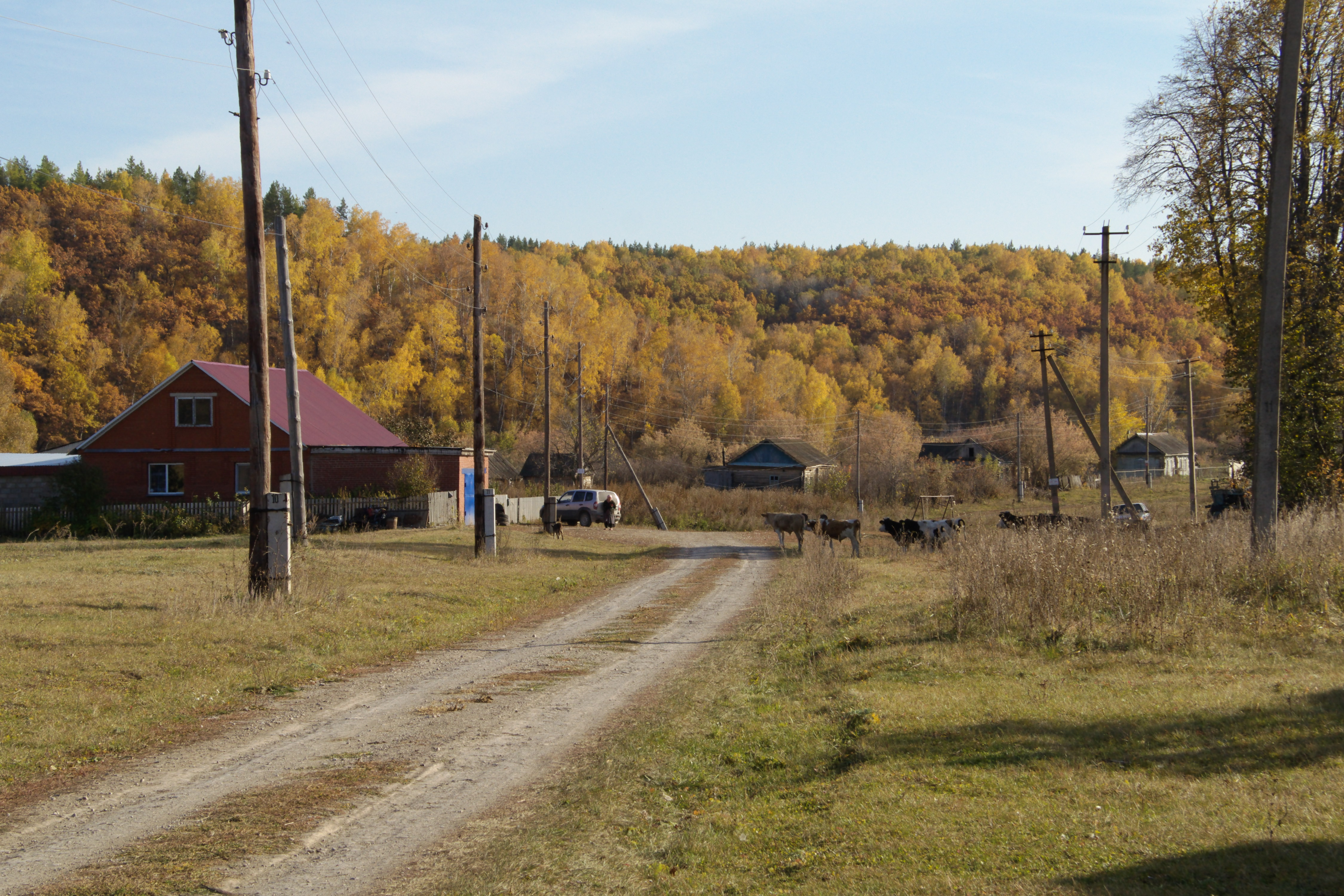

- Location within Bashkortostan Location within Russia
- Coordinates: 53°31′N 54°07′E
- Country: Russia
- Region: Bashkortostan
- District: Bizhbulyaksky District

Mullanur-Bakhitovo (Russian: Мулланур-Вахитово; Bashkir: Мулланур Вәхитов, Mullanur Wäxitow) is a rural locality (a village) in Aitovsky Selsoviet, Bizhbulyaksky District, Bashkortostan, Russia. The population was 25 in 2010. It is 29 kilometres (18 mi) southwest of Bizhbulyak (the district's administrative centre) by road. Alexeyevka is the nearest rural locality.
