= Kosh-Yelga =

Kosh-Yelga Кош-Елга
- Selo
- Location within Bashkortostan Location within Russia
- Coordinates: 53°54′N 54°13′E
- Country: Russia
- Region: Bashkortostan
- District: Bizhbulyaksky District
- Time zone: UTC+5:00

Kosh-Yelga (Russian: Кош-Елга; Bashkir: Ҡушйылға, Quşyılğa) is a rural locality (a selo) and the administrative centre of Kosh-Yelginsky Selsoviet, Bizhbulyaksky District, Bashkortostan, Russia. The population was 759 as of 2010. There are 22 streets.

== Geography ==
Kosh-Yelga is located 41 km north of Bizhbulyak (the district's administrative centre) by road. Petrovka is the nearest rural locality.
