= Kurmanaybash =

Kurmanaybash Курманайбаш
- Selo
- Location within Bashkortostan Location within Russia
- Coordinates: 53°33′N 54°50′E
- Country: Russia
- Region: Bashkortostan
- District: Miyakinsky District
- Time zone: UTC+5:00

Kurmanaybash (Russian: Курманайбаш; Bashkir: Ҡорманайбаш, Qormanaybaş) is a rural locality (a selo) in Miyakinsky Selsoviet, Miyakinsky District, Bashkortostan, Russia. The population was 194 as of 2010. There are 2 streets.

== Geography ==
Kurmanaybash is located 10 km south of Kirgiz-Miyaki (the district's administrative centre) by road. Kryknarat is the nearest rural locality.
