= Yelbulak-Matveyevka =

Yelbulak-Matveyevka Елбулак-Матвеевка
- Selo
- Location within Bashkortostan Location within Russia
- Coordinates: 53°38′N 54°12′E
- Country: Russia
- Region: Bashkortostan
- District: Bizhbulyaksky District
- Time zone: UTC+5:00

Yelbulak-Matveyevka (Russian: Елбулак-Матвеевка; Bashkir: Йылболаҡ-Матвеевка, Yılbolaq-Matveyevka) is a rural locality (a selo) in Bizhbulyaksky Selsoviet, Bizhbulyaksky District, Bashkortostan, Russia. The population was 371 as of 2010. There are 3 streets.

== Geography ==
Yelbulak-Matveyevka is located 8 km southwest of Bizhbulyak (the district's administrative centre) by road. Pchelnik is the nearest rural locality.
