= Yashlyar =

Yashlyar Яшляр
- Village
- Location within Bashkortostan Location within Russia
- Coordinates: 53°28′N 55°02′E
- Country: Russia
- Region: Bashkortostan
- District: Miyakinsky District
- Time zone: UTC+5:00

Yashlyar (Russian: Яшляр; Bashkir: Йәшләр, Yäşlär) is a rural locality (a village) in Bolshekarkalinksy Selsoviet, Miyakinsky District, Bashkortostan, Russia. The population was 18 as of 2010. There is 1 street.

== Geography ==
Yashlyar is located 33 km southeast of Kirgiz-Miyaki (the district's administrative centre) by road. Bolshiye Karkaly is the nearest rural locality.
