= Vasilkino =

Vasilkino Василькино
- Village
- Location within Bashkortostan Location within Russia
- Coordinates: 53°33′N 54°00′E
- Country: Russia
- Region: Bashkortostan
- District: Bizhbulyaksky District
- Time zone: UTC+5:00

Vasilkino (Russian: Василькино) is a rural locality (a village) in Kamensky Selsoviet, Bizhbulyaksky District, Bashkortostan, Russia. The population was 3 as of 2010. There is 1 street.

== Geography ==
Vasilkino is located 33 km southwest of Bizhbulyak (the district's administrative centre) by road. Progress is the nearest rural locality.
