= Kanareyka =

Kanareyka Канарейка
- Village
- Location within Bashkortostan Location within Russia
- Coordinates: 53°49′N 54°04′E
- Country: Russia
- Region: Bashkortostan
- District: Bizhbulyaksky District
- Time zone: UTC+5:00

Kanareyka (Russian: Канарейка) is a rural locality (a village) in Mikhaylovsky Selsoviet, Bizhbulyaksky District, Bashkortostan, Russia. The population was 4 as of 2010. There is 1 street.

== Geography ==
Kanareyka is located 26 km northwest of Bizhbulyak (the district's administrative centre) by road.
