= Barsh =

Barsh Барш
- Village
- Location within Bashkortostan Location within Russia
- Coordinates: 53°41′N 54°19′E
- Country: Russia
- Region: Bashkortostan
- District: Bizhbulyaksky District
- Time zone: UTC+5:00

Barsh (Russian: Барш; Bashkir: Барыш, Barış) is a rural locality (a village) in Bizhbulyaksky Selsoviet, Bizhbulyaksky District, Bashkortostan, Russia. The population was 119 as of 2010. There are 2 streets.

== Geography ==
Barsh is located 4 km east of Bizhbulyak (the district's administrative centre) by road. Alexeyevka is the nearest rural locality.
