= Anyasevo =

Anyasevo Анясево
- Selo
- Location within Bashkortostan Location within Russia
- Coordinates: 53°36′N 54°58′E
- Country: Russia
- Region: Bashkortostan
- District: Miyakinsky District
- Time zone: UTC+5:00

Anyasevo (Russian: Анясево; Bashkir: Әнәс, Änäs) is a rural locality (a selo) and the administrative centre of Miyakibashevsky Selsoviet, Miyakinsky District, Bashkortostan, Russia. The population was 921 as of 2010. There are 11 streets.

== Geography ==
Anyasevo is located 13 km southeast of Kirgiz-Miyaki (the district's administrative centre) by road. Nikolskoye is the nearest rural locality.
