= Razayevka =

Razayevka Разаевка
- Village
- Location within Bashkortostan Location within Russia
- Coordinates: 53°45′N 54°25′E
- Country: Russia
- Region: Bashkortostan
- District: Bizhbulyaksky District
- Time zone: UTC+5:00

Razayevka (Russian: Разаевка; Bashkir: Разия, Raziya) is a rural locality (a village) in Kenger-Meneuzovsky Selsoviet, Bizhbulyaksky District, Bashkortostan, Russia. The population was 80 as of 2010. There is 1 street.

== Geography ==
Razayevka is located 20 km northeast of Bizhbulyak (the district's administrative centre) by road. Ittikhat is the nearest rural locality.
