= Ibraykino =

Ibraykino Ибрайкино
- Village
- Location within Bashkortostan Location within Russia
- Coordinates: 53°38′N 54°19′E
- Country: Russia
- Region: Bashkortostan
- District: Bizhbulyaksky District
- Time zone: UTC+5:00

Ibraykino (Russian: Ибрайкино; Bashkir: Ибрай, İbray) is a rural locality (a village) in Bizhbulyaksky Selsoviet, Bizhbulyaksky District, Bashkortostan, Russia. The population was 20 as of 2010. There is 1 street.

== Geography ==
Ibraykino is located 10 km southeast of Bizhbulyak (the district's administrative centre) by road. Verkhnyaya Kurmaza is the nearest rural locality.
