= Kamyshly, Republic of Bashkortostan =

Kamyshly Камышлы
- Village
- Location within Bashkortostan Location within Russia
- Coordinates: 53°29′N 55°02′E
- Country: Russia
- Region: Bashkortostan
- District: Miyakinsky District
- Time zone: UTC+5:00

Kamyshly (Russian: Камышлы; Bashkir: Ҡамышлы, Qamışlı) is a rural locality (a village) in Bolshekarkalinksy Selsoviet, Miyakinsky District, Bashkortostan, Russia. The population was 43 as of 2010. There is 1 street.

== Geography ==
Kamyshly is located 32 km southeast of Kirgiz-Miyaki (the district's administrative centre) by road. Bolshiye Karkaly is the nearest rural locality.
