= Tulubayevo =

Tulubayevo Тулубаево
- Village
- Location within Bashkortostan Location within Russia
- Coordinates: 53°26′N 54°25′E
- Country: Russia
- Region: Bashkortostan
- District: Bizhbulyaksky District
- Time zone: UTC+5:00

Tulubayevo (Russian: Тулубаево; Bashkir: Тулыбай, Tulıbay) is a rural locality (a village) in Dyomsky Selsoviet, Bizhbulyaksky District, Bashkortostan, Russia. The population was 319 as of 2010. There are 5 streets.

== Geography ==
Tulubayevo is located 34 km southeast of Bizhbulyak (the district's administrative centre) by road. Islamgulovo is the nearest rural locality.
