= Chiryashtamak =

Chiryashtamak Чиряштамак
- Village
- Location within Bashkortostan Location within Russia
- Coordinates: 53°39′N 54°32′E
- Country: Russia
- Region: Bashkortostan
- District: Miyakinsky District
- Time zone: UTC+5:00

Chiryashtamak (Russian: Чиряштамак; Bashkir: Сирәштамаҡ, Siräştamaq) is a rural locality (a village) in Bogdanovsky Selsoviet, Miyakinsky District, Bashkortostan, Russia. The population was 132 as of 2010. There are 4 streets.

== Geography ==
Chiryashtamak is located 20 km west of Kirgiz-Miyaki (the district's administrative centre) by road. Kanbekovo is the nearest rural locality.
