= Yashelkul =

Yashelkul Яшелькуль
- Village
- Location within Bashkortostan Location within Russia
- Coordinates: 53°25′N 54°31′E
- Country: Russia
- Region: Bashkortostan
- District: Miyakinsky District
- Time zone: UTC+5:00

Yashelkul (Russian: Яшелькуль; Bashkir: Йәшелкүл, Yäşelkül) is a rural locality (a village) in Zildyarovsky Selsoviet, Miyakinsky District, Bashkortostan, Russia. The population was 2 as of 2010. There is 1 street.

== Geography ==
Yashelkul is located 41 km southwest of Kirgiz-Miyaki (the district's administrative centre) by road. Shatmantamak is the nearest rural locality.
