= Verkhotsenko =

Verkhotsenko Верхоценко
- Village
- Location within Bashkortostan Location within Russia
- Coordinates: 53°33′N 55°05′E
- Country: Russia
- Region: Bashkortostan
- District: Miyakinsky District
- Time zone: UTC+5:00

Verkhotsenko (Russian: Верхоценко) is a rural locality (a village) in Bolshekarkalinksy Selsoviet, Miyakinsky District, Bashkortostan, Russia. The population was 1 as of 2010. There is 1 street.

== Geography ==
Verkhotsenko is located 23 km southeast of Kirgiz-Miyaki (the district's administrative centre) by road. Verkhny Gulyum is the nearest rural locality.
