= Urshak =

Urshak Уршак
- Village
- Location within Bashkortostan Location within Russia
- Coordinates: 53°38′N 55°13′E
- Country: Russia
- Region: Bashkortostan
- District: Miyakinsky District
- Time zone: UTC+5:00

Urshak (Russian: Уршак; Bashkir: Өршәк, Örşäk) is a rural locality (a village) in Urshakbashkaramalinsky Selsoviet, Miyakinsky District, Bashkortostan, Russia. The population was 413 as of 2010. There are 3 streets.

== Geography ==
Urshak is located 37 km east of Kirgiz-Miyaki (the district's administrative centre) by road. Urshakbashkaramaly is the nearest rural locality.
