= Kultay-Karan =

Kultay-Karan Култай-Каран
- Village
- Location within Bashkortostan Location within Russia
- Coordinates: 53°33′25″N 54°29′47″E
- Country: Russia
- Region: Bashkortostan
- District: Miyakinsky District
- Time zone: UTC+5:00

Kultay-Karan (Russian: Култай-Каран; Bashkir: Ҡолтай-Ҡаран, Qoltay-Qaran) is a rural locality (a village) in Bogdanovsky Selsoviet, Miyakinsky District, Bashkortostan, Russia. The population was 204 as of 2010. There are 4 streets.

== Geography ==
Kultay-Karan is located 32 km southwest of Kirgiz-Miyaki (the district's administrative centre) by road. Dyomsky is the nearest rural locality.
