= Shkapovo =

Shkapovo Шкапово
- Village
- Location within Bashkortostan Location within Russia
- Coordinates: 53°46′N 54°06′E
- Country: Russia
- Region: Bashkortostan
- District: Bizhbulyaksky District
- Time zone: UTC+5:00

Shkapovo (Russian: Шкапово) is a rural locality (a village) in Mikhaylovsky Selsoviet, Bizhbulyaksky District, Bashkortostan, Russia. The population was 4 as of 2010. There are 4 streets.

== Geography ==
Shkapovo is located 15 km northwest of Bizhbulyak (the district's administrative centre) by road. Milisonovka is the nearest rural locality.
