= Smorodinovka =

Smorodinovka Смородиновка
- Village
- Location within Bashkortostan Location within Russia
- Coordinates: 53°31′N 55°04′E
- Country: Russia
- Region: Bashkortostan
- District: Miyakinsky District
- Time zone: UTC+5:00

Smorodinovka (Russian: Смородиновка) is a rural locality (a village) in Bolshekarkalinksy Selsoviet, Miyakinsky District, Bashkortostan, Russia. The population was 45 as of 2010. There is 1 street.

== Geography ==
Smorodinovka is located 24 km southeast of Kirgiz-Miyaki (the district's administrative centre) by road. Uyazybashevo is the nearest rural locality.
