= Lysogorka =

Lysogorka Лысогорка
- Village
- Location within Bashkortostan Location within Russia
- Coordinates: 53°39′N 54°00′E
- Country: Russia
- Region: Bashkortostan
- District: Bizhbulyaksky District
- Time zone: UTC+5:00

Lysogorka (Russian: Лысогорка) is a rural locality (a village) in Ziriklinsky Selsoviet, Bizhbulyaksky District, Bashkortostan, Russia. The population was 158 as of 2010. There are 2 streets.

== Geography ==
Lysogorka is located 23 km west of Bizhbulyak (the district's administrative centre) by road. Maly Sedyak is the nearest rural locality.
