= Kashkarovo, Miyakinsky District, Republic of Bashkortostan =

Kashkarovo Кашкарово
- Village
- Location within Bashkortostan Location within Russia
- Coordinates: 53°37′N 55°03′E
- Country: Russia
- Region: Bashkortostan
- District: Miyakinsky District
- Time zone: UTC+5:00

Kashkarovo (Russian: Кашкарово; Bashkir: Ҡашҡар, Qaşqar) is a rural locality (a village) in Miyakibashevsky Selsoviet, Miyakinsky District, Bashkortostan, Russia. The population was 58 as of 2010. There are 2 streets.

== Geography ==
Kashkarovo is located 27 km east of Kirgiz-Miyaki (the district's administrative centre) by road. Urshakbashkaramaly is the nearest rural locality.
