= Kanykayevo =

Kanykayevo Каныкаево
- Selo
- Location within Bashkortostan Location within Russia
- Coordinates: 53°25′N 54°09′E
- Country: Russia
- Region: Bashkortostan
- District: Bizhbulyaksky District
- Time zone: UTC+5:00

Kanykayevo (Russian: Каныкаево; Bashkir: Ҡаныҡай, Qanıqay) is a rural locality (a selo) in Bikkulovsky Selsoviet, Bizhbulyaksky District, Bashkortostan, Russia. The population was 360 as of 2010. There are 7 streets.

== Geography ==
Kanykayevo is located 37 km southwest of Bizhbulyak (the district's administrative centre) by road. Bikkulovo is the nearest rural locality.
