= Yelbulaktamak =

Yelbulaktamak Елбулактамак
- Selo
- Location within Bashkortostan Location within Russia
- Coordinates: 53°32′N 54°15′E
- Country: Russia
- Region: Bashkortostan
- District: Bizhbulyaksky District
- Time zone: UTC+5:00

Yelbulaktamak (Russian: Елбулактамак; Bashkir: Йылболаҡтамаҡ, Yılbolaqtaqmaq) is a rural locality (a selo) and the administrative centre of Yelbulaktamaksky Selsoviet, Bizhbulyaksky District, Bashkortostan, Russia. The population was 623 as of 2010. There are 9 streets.

== Geography ==
Yelbulaktamak is located 24 km south of Bizhbulyak (the district's administrative centre) by road. Kachkinovo is the nearest rural locality.
