= Kistenli-Ivanovka =

Kistenli-Ivanovka Кистенли-Ивановка
- Selo
- Location within Bashkortostan Location within Russia
- Coordinates: 53°50′N 54°10′E
- Country: Russia
- Region: Bashkortostan
- District: Bizhbulyaksky District
- Time zone: UTC+5:00

Kistenli-Ivanovka (Russian: Кистенли-Ивановка; Bashkir: Киҫтәнле-Ивановка, Kiśtänle-İvanovka) is a rural locality (a selo) in Mikhaylovsky Selsoviet, Bizhbulyaksky District, Bashkortostan, Russia. The population was 290 as of 2010. There are 3 streets.

== Geography ==
Kistenli-Ivanovka is located 26 km northwest of Bizhbulyak (the district's administrative centre) by road. Sene-Purnas is the nearest rural locality.
