= Mayak, Republic of Bashkortostan =

Mayak Маяк
- Village
- Location within Bashkortostan Location within Russia
- Coordinates: 53°42′N 54°55′E
- Country: Russia
- Region: Bashkortostan
- District: Miyakinsky District
- Time zone: UTC+5:00

Mayak (Russian: Маяк) is a rural locality (a village) in Bikkulovsky Selsoviet, Miyakinsky District, Bashkortostan, Russia. The population was 122 as of 2010. There are 3 streets.

== Geography ==
Mayak is located 30 km northeast of Kirgiz-Miyaki (the district's administrative centre) by road. 2-ye Miyakibashevo is the nearest rural locality.
