= Kasimovka, Bizhbulyaksky District, Republic of Bashkortostan =

Kasimovka Касимовка
- Village
- Location within Bashkortostan Location within Russia
- Coordinates: 53°43′N 54°23′E
- Country: Russia
- Region: Bashkortostan
- District: Bizhbulyaksky District
- Time zone: UTC+5:00

Kasimovka (Russian: Касимовка; Bashkir: Ҡасим, Qasim) is a rural locality (a village) in Kenger-Meneuzovsky Selsoviet, Bizhbulyaksky District, Bashkortostan, Russia. The population was 123 as of 2010. There is 1 street.

== Geography ==
Kasimovka is located 18 km northeast of Bizhbulyak (the district's administrative centre) by road. Kunakulovo is the nearest rural locality.
