= Kul-Kanas =

Kul-Kanas Куль-Кункас
- Selo
- Location within Bashkortostan Location within Russia
- Coordinates: 53°47′N 54°56′E
- Country: Russia
- Region: Bashkortostan
- District: Miyakinsky District
- Time zone: UTC+5:00

Kul-Kanas (Russian: Куль-Кункас; Bashkir: Күл-Ҡуңҡаҫ, Kül-Quñqaś) is a rural locality (a selo) in Karanovsky Selsoviet, Miyakinsky District, Bashkortostan, Russia. The population was 209 as of 2010. There are 2 streets.

== Geography ==
Kul-Kanas is located 35 km northeast of Kirgiz-Miyaki (the district's administrative centre) by road. Karan-Kunkas is the nearest rural locality.
