= Ilchigulovo =

Ilchigulovo Ильчигулово
- Selo
- Location within Bashkortostan Location within Russia
- Coordinates: 53°49′N 54°59′E
- Country: Russia
- Region: Bashkortostan
- District: Miyakinsky District
- Time zone: UTC+5:00

Ilchigulovo (Russian: Ильчигулово; Bashkir: Илсеғол, İlseğol) is a rural locality (a selo) and the administrative centre of Ilchigulovsky Selsoviet, Miyakinsky District, Bashkortostan, Russia. The population was ▼849 as of 2021. There are five streets.

== Geography ==
Ilchigulovo is located 41 km northeast of Kirgiz-Miyaki (the district's administrative centre) by road. Kunkas is the nearest rural locality.
