= Kandry-Kul =

Kandry-Kul Кандры-Куль
- Village
- Location within Bashkortostan Location within Russia
- Coordinates: 53°41′N 54°13′E
- Country: Russia
- Region: Bashkortostan
- District: Bizhbulyaksky District
- Time zone: UTC+5:00

Kandry-Kul (Russian: Кандры-Куль; Bashkir: Ҡандракүл, Qandrakül) is a rural locality (a village) in Bizhbulyaksky Selsoviet, Bizhbulyaksky District, Bashkortostan, Russia. The population was 131 as of 2010. There are 2 streets.

== Geography ==
Kandry-Kul is located 5 km west of Bizhbulyak (the district's administrative centre) by road. Bizhbulyak is the nearest rural locality.
