= Chetyrbash =

Chetyrbash Четырбаш
- Village
- Location within Bashkortostan Location within Russia
- Coordinates: 53°36′N 54°43′E
- Country: Russia
- Region: Bashkortostan
- District: Miyakinsky District
- Time zone: UTC+5:00

Chetyrbash (Russian: Четырбаш; Bashkir: Сытырбаш, Sıtırbaş) is a rural locality (a village) in Miyakinsky Selsoviet, Miyakinsky District, Bashkortostan, Russia. The population was 117 as of 2010. There are 2 streets.

== Geography ==
Chetyrbash is located 7 km southwest of Kirgiz-Miyaki (the district's administrative centre) by road. Kirgiz-Miyaki is the nearest rural locality.
