= Zirikly, Miyakinsky District, Republic of Bashkortostan =

Zirikly Зириклы
- Village
- Location within Bashkortostan Location within Russia
- Coordinates: 53°42′N 54°43′E
- Country: Russia
- Region: Bashkortostan
- District: Miyakinsky District
- Time zone: UTC+5:00

Zirikly (Russian: Зириклы; Bashkir: Ерекле, Yerekle) is a rural locality (a village) in Novokarmalinsky Selsoviet, Miyakinsky District, Bashkortostan, Russia. The population was 90 as of 2010. There are 2 streets.

== Geography ==
Zirikly is located 11 km northwest of Kirgiz-Miyaki (the district's administrative centre) by road. Andreyevka is the nearest rural locality.
