= Russkoye Ursayevo =

Russkoye Ursayevo Русское Урсаево
- Selo
- Location within Bashkortostan Location within Russia
- Coordinates: 53°39′N 54°31′E
- Country: Russia
- Region: Bashkortostan
- District: Miyakinsky District
- Time zone: UTC+5:00

Russkoye Ursayevo (Russian: Русское Урсаево; Bashkir: Урыҫ Урсайы, Urıś Ursayı) is a rural locality (a selo) in Yenebey-Ursayevsky Selsoviet, Miyakinsky District, Bashkortostan, Russia. The population was 28 as of 2010. There are 2 streets.

== Geography ==
Russkoye Ursayevo is located 23 km west of Kirgiz-Miyaki (the district's administrative centre) by road. Chiryashtamak is the nearest rural locality.
