= Novoalexeyevka, Miyakinsky District, Republic of Bashkortostan =

Novoalexeyevka Новоалексеевка
- Village
- Location within Bashkortostan Location within Russia
- Coordinates: 53°40′N 54°58′E
- Country: Russia
- Region: Bashkortostan
- District: Miyakinsky District
- Time zone: UTC+5:00

Novoalexeyevka (Russian: Новоалексеевка) is a rural locality (a village) in Miyakibashevsky Selsoviet, Miyakinsky District, Bashkortostan, Russia. The population was 8 as of 2010. There is 1 street.

== Geography ==
Novoalexeyevka is located 17 km northeast of Kirgiz-Miyaki (the district's administrative centre) by road. Dneprovka is the nearest rural locality.
