= Chyatay-Burzyan =

Chyatay-Burzyan Чятай-Бурзян
- Village
- Location within Bashkortostan Location within Russia
- Coordinates: 53°48′N 54°49′E
- Country: Russia
- Region: Bashkortostan
- District: Miyakinsky District
- Time zone: UTC+5:00

Chyatay-Burzyan (Russian: Чятай-Бурзян; Bashkir: Сәтәй-Бөрйән, Sätäy-Böryän) is a rural locality (a village) in Bikkulovsky Selsoviet, Miyakinsky District, Bashkortostan, Russia. The population was 268 as of 2010. There are 5 streets.

== Geography ==
Chyatay-Burzyan is located 29 km north of Kirgiz-Miyaki (the district's administrative centre) by road. Sadovy is the nearest rural locality.
