= Kachkinovo =

Kachkinovo Качкиново
- Village
- Location within Bashkortostan Location within Russia
- Coordinates: 53°31′N 54°17′E
- Country: Russia
- Region: Bashkortostan
- District: Bizhbulyaksky District
- Time zone: UTC+5:00

Kachkinovo (Russian: Качкиново; Bashkir: Ҡасҡын, Qasqın) is a rural locality (a village) in Yelbulaktamaksky Selsoviet, Bizhbulyaksky District, Bashkortostan, Russia. The population was 190 as of 2010. There are 3 streets.

== Geography ==
Kachkinovo is located 28 km south of Bizhbulyak (the district's administrative centre) by road. Yelbulaktamak is the nearest rural locality.
