= Sadovy, Miyakinsky District, Republic of Bashkortostan =

Sadovy Садовый
- Selo
- Location within Bashkortostan Location within Russia
- Coordinates: 53°49′N 54°48′E
- Country: Russia
- Region: Bashkortostan
- District: Miyakinsky District
- Time zone: UTC+5:00

Sadovy (Russian: Садовый) is a rural locality (a selo) and the administrative centre of Bikkulovsky Selsoviet, Miyakinsky District, Bashkortostan, Russia. The population was 569 as of 2010. There are 6 streets.

== Geography ==
Sadovy is located 26 km north of Kirgiz-Miyaki (the district's administrative centre) by road. Chyatay-Burzyan is the nearest rural locality.
