= Takmakkaran =

Takmakkaran Такмаккаран
- Village
- Location within Bashkortostan Location within Russia
- Coordinates: 53°38′N 54°02′E
- Country: Russia
- Region: Bashkortostan
- District: Bizhbulyaksky District
- Time zone: UTC+5:00

Takmakkaran (Russian: Такмаккаран; Bashkir: Туҡмакҡаран, Tuqmaqqaran) is a rural locality (a village) in Ziriklinsky Selsoviet, Bizhbulyaksky District, Bashkortostan, Russia. The population was 47 as of 2010. There is 1 street.

== Geography ==
Takmakkaran is located 20 km southwest of Bizhbulyak (the district's administrative centre) by road. Maly Sedyak is the nearest rural locality.
