= Sedyakbash =

Sedyakbash Седякбаш
- Village
- Location within Bashkortostan Location within Russia
- Coordinates: 53°42′N 54°07′E
- Country: Russia
- Region: Bashkortostan
- District: Bizhbulyaksky District
- Time zone: UTC+5:00

Sedyakbash (Russian: Седякбаш; Bashkir: Сиҙәкбаш, Siźäkbaş) is a rural locality (a village) in Bizhbulyaksky Selsoviet, Bizhbulyaksky District, Bashkortostan, Russia. The population was 428 as of 2010. There are 3 streets.

== Geography ==
Sedyakbash is located 14 km northwest of Bizhbulyak (the district's administrative centre) by road. Maly Sedyak is the nearest rural locality.
