= Shatra, Republic of Bashkortostan =

Shatra Шатра
- Village
- Location within Bashkortostan Location within Russia
- Coordinates: 53°33′N 54°42′E
- Country: Russia
- Region: Bashkortostan
- District: Miyakinsky District
- Time zone: UTC+5:00

Shatra (Russian: Шатра; Bashkir: Шатра, Şatra) is a rural locality (a village) in Satyyevsky Selsoviet, Miyakinsky District, Bashkortostan, Russia. The population was 9 as of 2010. There is 1 street.

== Geography ==
Shatra is located 13 km southwest of Kirgiz-Miyaki (the district's administrative centre) by road. Rzhanovka is the nearest rural locality.
