= Kozhay-Ikskiye Vershiny =

Kozhay-Ikskiye Vershiny Кожай-Икские Вершины
- Selo
- Location within Bashkortostan Location within Russia
- Coordinates: 53°52′N 54°04′E
- Country: Russia
- Region: Bashkortostan
- District: Bizhbulyaksky District
- Time zone: UTC+5:00

Kozhay-Ikskiye Vershiny (Russian: Кожай-Икские Вершины; Bashkir: Кожай-Ыҡбашы, Kojay-Iqbaşı) is a rural locality (a selo) in Mikhaylovsky Selsoviet, Bizhbulyaksky District, Bashkortostan, Russia. The population was 275 as of 2010. There are 6 streets.

== Geography ==
Kozhay-Ikskiye Vershiny is located 30 km northwest of Bizhbulyak (the district's administrative centre) by road. Kozhay-Maximovo and Ignashkino are the nearest rural localities.
