= Verkhnyaya Kurmaza =

Verkhnyaya Kurmaza Верхняя Курмаза
- Selo
- Location within Bashkortostan Location within Russia
- Coordinates: 53°37′N 54°18′E
- Country: Russia
- Region: Bashkortostan
- District: Bizhbulyaksky District
- Time zone: UTC+5:00

Verkhnyaya Kurmaza (Russian: Верхняя Курмаза; Bashkir: Үрге Көрмәҙе, Ürge Körmäźe) is a rural locality (a selo) in Bizhbulyaksky Selsoviet, Bizhbulyaksky District, Bashkortostan, Russia. The population was 53 as of 2010. There are 3 streets.

== Geography ==
Verkhnyaya Kurmaza is located 9 km south of Bizhbulyak (the district's administrative centre) by road. Ibraykino is the nearest rural locality.
