= Satyyevo =

Satyyevo Сатыево
- Selo
- Location within Bashkortostan Location within Russia
- Coordinates: 53°30′N 54°44′E
- Country: Russia
- Region: Bashkortostan
- District: Miyakinsky District
- Time zone: UTC+5:00

Satyyevo (Russian: Сатыево; Bashkir: Сатый, Satıy) is a rural locality (a selo) and the administrative centre of Satyyevsky Selsoviet, Miyakinsky District, Bashkortostan, Russia. The population was 590 as of 2010. There are 5 streets.

== Geography ==
Satyyevo is located 18 km southwest of Kirgiz-Miyaki (the district's administrative centre) by road. Chulpan is the nearest rural locality.
