= Zaypekul =

Zaypekul Зайпекуль
- Village
- Location within Bashkortostan Location within Russia
- Coordinates: 53°43′N 55°09′E
- Country: Russia
- Region: Bashkortostan
- District: Miyakinsky District
- Time zone: UTC+5:00

Zaypekul (Russian: Зайпекуль; Bashkir: Зәйпекүл, Zäypekül) is a rural locality (a village) in Karanovsky Selsoviet, Miyakinsky District, Bashkortostan, Russia. The population was 46 as of 2010. There are 2 streets.

== Geography ==
Zaypekul is located 32 km northeast of Kirgiz-Miyaki (the district's administrative centre) by road. Sofiyevka is the nearest rural locality.
