= Chiyale =

Chiyale Чияле
- Village
- Location within Bashkortostan Location within Russia
- Coordinates: 53°22′N 54°38′E
- Country: Russia
- Region: Bashkortostan
- District: Miyakinsky District
- Time zone: UTC+5:00

Chiyale (Russian: Чияле; Bashkir: Сейәле, Seyäle) is a rural locality (a village) in Zildyarovsky Selsoviet, Miyakinsky District, Bashkortostan, Russia. The population was 12 as of 2010. There is 1 street.

== Geography ==
Chiyale is located 41 km southwest of Kirgiz-Miyaki (the district's administrative centre) by road. Uspekh is the nearest rural locality.
