= Dneprovka =

Dneprovka Днепровка
- Village
- Location within Bashkortostan Location within Russia
- Coordinates: 53°40′N 55°01′E
- Country: Russia
- Region: Bashkortostan
- District: Miyakinsky District
- Time zone: UTC+5:00

Dneprovka (Russian: Днепровка) is a rural locality (a village) in Miyakibashevsky Selsoviet, Miyakinsky District, Bashkortostan, Russia. The population was 80 as of 2010. There are 2 streets.

== Geography ==
Dneprovka is located 22 km northeast of Kirgiz-Miyaki (the district's administrative centre) by road. Novy Mir is the nearest rural locality.
