= Aitovo, Miyakinsky District, Republic of Bashkortostan =

Aitovo Аитово
- Village
- Location within Bashkortostan Location within Russia
- Coordinates: 53°41′N 55°18′E
- Country: Russia
- Region: Bashkortostan
- District: Miyakinsky District
- Time zone: UTC+5:00

Aitovo (Russian: Аитово; Bashkir: Айыт, Ayıt) is a rural locality (a village) in Urshakbashkaramalinsky Selsoviet, Miyakinsky District, Bashkortostan, Russia. The population was 121 as of 2010. There are 2 streets.

== Geography ==
Aitovo is located 45 km northeast of Kirgiz-Miyaki (the district's administrative centre) by road. Chishmy is the nearest rural locality.
