= Baytimirovo =

Baytimirovo Байтимирово
- Village
- Location within Bashkortostan Location within Russia
- Coordinates: 53°35′N 55°03′E
- Country: Russia
- Region: Bashkortostan
- District: Miyakinsky District
- Time zone: UTC+5:00

Baytimirovo (Russian: Байтимирово; Bashkir: Байтимер, Baytimer) is a rural locality (a village) in Urshakbashkaramalinsky Selsoviet, Miyakinsky District, Bashkortostan, Russia. The population was 140 as of 2010. There are 2 streets.

== Geography ==
Baytimirovo is located 25 km southeast of Kirgiz-Miyaki (the district's administrative centre) by road. Uyazybashevo is the nearest rural locality.
