= Maximovka =

Maximovka Максимовка
- Village
- Location within Bashkortostan Location within Russia
- Coordinates: 53°42′N 55°05′E
- Country: Russia
- Region: Bashkortostan
- District: Miyakinsky District
- Time zone: UTC+5:00

Maximovka (Russian: Максимовка) is a rural locality (a village) in Miyakibashevsky Selsoviet, Miyakinsky District, Bashkortostan, Russia. The population was 2 as of 2010. There is 1 street.

== Geography ==
Maximovka is located 26 km northeast of Kirgiz-Miyaki (the district's administrative centre) by road. Nikolayevka is the nearest rural locality.
