= Novy Biktyash =

Novy Biktyash Новый Биктяш
- Selo
- Location within Bashkortostan Location within Russia
- Coordinates: 53°46′N 53°55′E
- Country: Russia
- Region: Bashkortostan
- District: Bizhbulyaksky District
- Time zone: UTC+5:00

Novy Biktyash (Russian: Новый Биктяш; Bashkir: Яңы Бикташ, Yañı Biktaş) is a rural locality (a selo) in Sukhorechensky Selsoviet, Bizhbulyaksky District, Bashkortostan, Russia. The population was 315 as of 2010. There are 5 streets.

== Geography ==
Novy Biktyash is located 31 km northwest of Bizhbulyak (the district's administrative centre) by road. Muradymovo is the nearest rural locality.
