= Zidigan =

Zidigan Зидиган
- Village
- Location within Bashkortostan Location within Russia
- Coordinates: 53°32′N 55°00′E
- Country: Russia
- Region: Bashkortostan
- District: Miyakinsky District
- Time zone: UTC+5:00

Zidigan (Russian: Зидиган; Bashkir: Етегән, Yetegän) is a rural locality (a village) in Bolshekarkalinksy Selsoviet, Miyakinsky District, Bashkortostan, Russia. The population was 54 as of 2010. There are 2 streets.

== Geography ==
Zidigan is located 25 km southeast of Kirgiz-Miyaki (the district's administrative centre) by road. Dubrovka is the nearest rural locality.
