= Meneuz-Moskva =

Meneuz-Moskva Менеуз-Москва
- Selo
- Location within Bashkortostan Location within Russia
- Coordinates: 53°52′N 54°19′E
- Country: Russia
- Region: Bashkortostan
- District: Bizhbulyaksky District
- Time zone: UTC+5:00

Meneuz-Moskva (Russian: Менеуз-Москва; Bashkir: Мәнәүез-Мәскәү, Mänäwez-Mäskäw) is a rural locality (a selo) in Kosh-Yelginsky Selsoviet, Bizhbulyaksky District, Bashkortostan, Russia. The population was 261 as of 2010. There are 9 streets.

== Geography ==
Meneuz-Moskva is located 49 km north of Bizhbulyak (the district's administrative centre) by road. Yermolkino is the nearest rural locality.
