= Kozhay-Semyonovka =

Kozhay-Semyonovka Кожай-Семёновка
- Selo
- Location within Bashkortostan Location within Russia
- Coordinates: 53°44′N 54°42′E
- Country: Russia
- Region: Bashkortostan
- District: Miyakinsky District
- Time zone: UTC+5:00

Kozhay-Semyonovka (Russian: Кожай-Семёновка) is a rural locality (a selo) and the administrative centre of Kozhay-Semyonovsky Selsoviet, Miyakinsky District, Bashkortostan, Russia. The population was 590 as of 2010. There are 5 streets.

== Geography ==
Kozhay-Semyonovka is located 20 km north of Kirgiz-Miyaki (the district's administrative centre) by road. Keken-Vasilyevka is the nearest rural locality.
