= Narystau =

Narystau Нарыстау
- Selo
- Location within Bashkortostan Location within Russia
- Coordinates: 53°50′N 55°02′E
- Country: Russia
- Region: Bashkortostan
- District: Miyakinsky District
- Time zone: UTC+5:00

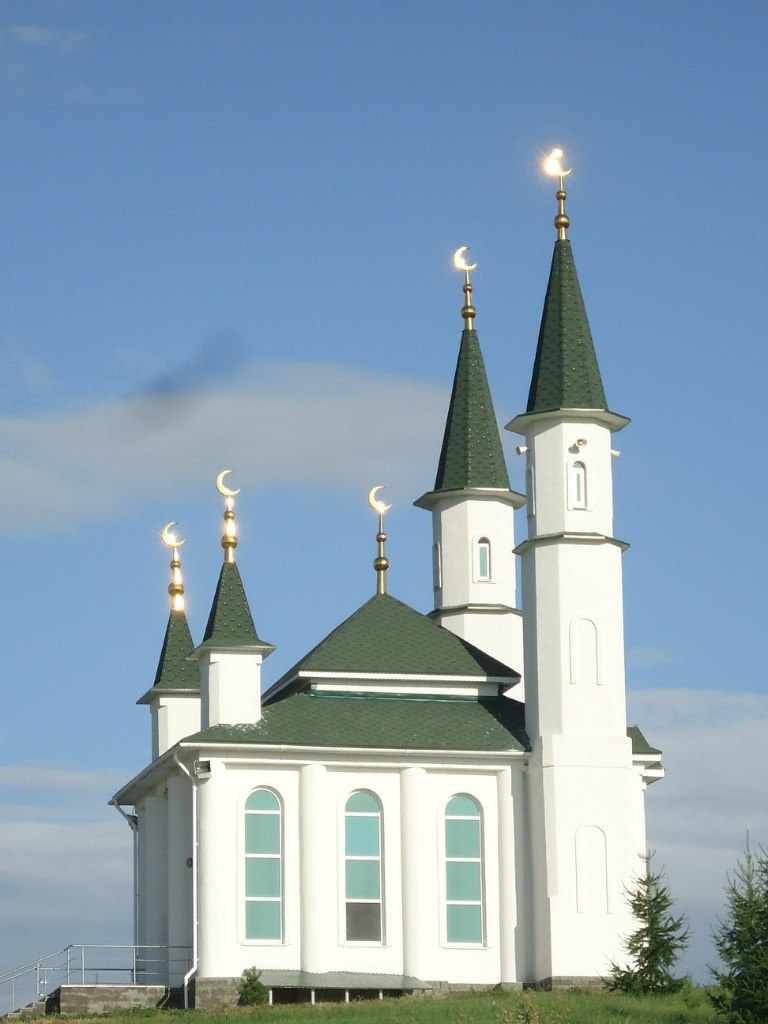
A mosque near Mount Narystau

Narystau (Russian: Нарыстау; Bashkir: Нарыҫтау, Narıśtaw) is a rural locality (a selo) in Ilchigulovsky Selsoviet, Miyakinsky District, Bashkortostan, Russia. The population was 331 as of 2010. There are 3 streets.

== Geography ==
Narystau is located 45 km northeast of Kirgiz-Miyaki (the district's administrative centre) by road. Chebenli is the nearest rural locality.
