= Kalinovka, Bizhbulyaksky District, Republic of Bashkortostan =

Kalinovka Калиновка
- Village
- Location within Bashkortostan Location within Russia
- Coordinates: 53°43′N 54°12′E
- Country: Russia
- Region: Bashkortostan
- District: Bizhbulyaksky District
- Time zone: UTC+5:00

Kalinovka (Russian: Калиновка) is a rural locality (a village) in Bizhbulyaksky Selsoviet, Bizhbulyaksky District, Bashkortostan, Russia. The population was 109 as of 2010. There are 4 streets.

== Geography ==
Kalinovka is located 7 km northwest of Bizhbulyak (the district's administrative centre) by road. Bizhbulyak is the nearest rural locality.
