= Ikhtisad =

Ikhtisad Ихтисад
- Village
- Location within Bashkortostan Location within Russia
- Coordinates: 53°44′N 54°31′E
- Country: Russia
- Region: Bashkortostan
- District: Miyakinsky District
- Time zone: UTC+5:00

Ikhtisad (Russian: Ихтисад; Bashkir: Ихтисад, İxtisad) is a rural locality (a village) in Meneuztamaksky Selsoviet, Miyakinsky District, Bashkortostan, Russia. The population was 102 as of 2010. There is 1 street.

== Geography ==
Ikhtisad is located 33 km northwest of Kirgiz-Miyaki (the district's administrative centre) by road. Tukmakbash is the nearest rural locality.
