= Bogolyubovka =

Bogolyubovka Боголюбовка
- Village
- Location within Bashkortostan Location within Russia
- Coordinates: 53°29′N 54°18′E
- Country: Russia
- Region: Bashkortostan
- District: Bizhbulyaksky District
- Time zone: UTC+5:00

Bogolyubovka (Russian: Боголюбовка) is a rural locality (a village) in Dyomsky Selsoviet, Bizhbulyaksky District, Bashkortostan, Russia. The population was 158 as of 2010. There are 2 streets.

== Geography ==
Bogolyubovka is located 31 km south of Bizhbulyak (the district's administrative centre) by road. Kachkinovo is the nearest rural locality.
