= Ignashkino =

Ignashkino Игнашкино
- Village
- Location within Bashkortostan Location within Russia
- Coordinates: 53°53′N 54°06′E
- Country: Russia
- Region: Bashkortostan
- District: Bizhbulyaksky District
- Time zone: UTC+5:00

Ignashkino (Russian: Игнашкино) is a rural locality (a village) in Mikhaylovsky Selsoviet, Bizhbulyaksky District, Bashkortostan, Russia. The population was 73 as of 2010. There is 1 street.

== Geography ==
Ignashkino is located 32 km northwest of Bizhbulyak (the district's administrative centre) by road. Mikhaylovka is the nearest rural locality.
