= Novyye Omelniki =

Novyye Omelniki Новые Омельники
- Village
- Location within Bashkortostan Location within Russia
- Coordinates: 53°32′N 54°42′E
- Country: Russia
- Region: Bashkortostan
- District: Miyakinsky District
- Time zone: UTC+5:00

Novyye Omelniki (Russian: Новые Омельники) is a rural locality (a village) in Satyyevsky Selsoviet, Miyakinsky District, Bashkortostan, Russia. The population was 64 as of 2010. There are 2 streets.

== Geography ==
Novyye Omelniki is located 14 km southwest of Kirgiz-Miyaki (the district's administrative centre) by road. Shatra is the nearest rural locality.
