= Satayevo =

Satayevo Сатаево
- Village
- Location within Bashkortostan Location within Russia
- Coordinates: 53°37′N 54°27′E
- Country: Russia
- Region: Bashkortostan
- District: Miyakinsky District
- Time zone: UTC+5:00

Satayevo (Russian: Сатаево; Bashkir: Сатай, Satay) is a rural locality (a village) in Yenebey-Ursayevsky Selsoviet, Miyakinsky District, Bashkortostan, Russia. The population was 136 as of 2010. There is 1 street.

== Geography ==
Satayevo is located 30 km west of Kirgiz-Miyaki (the district's administrative centre) by road. Yenebey-Ursayevo is the nearest rural locality.
