= Sene-Purnas =

Sene-Purnas Сене-Пурнас
- Village
- Location within Bashkortostan Location within Russia
- Coordinates: 53°50′N 54°09′E
- Country: Russia
- Region: Bashkortostan
- District: Bizhbulyaksky District
- Time zone: UTC+5:00

Sene-Purnas (Russian: Сене-Пурнас) is a rural locality (a village) in Mikhaylovsky Selsoviet, Bizhbulyaksky District, Bashkortostan, Russia. The population was 15 as of 2010. There is 1 street.

== Geography ==
Sene-Purnas is located 25 km northwest of Bizhbulyak (the district's administrative centre) by road. Kistenli-Ivanovka is the nearest rural locality.
