= Malyye Karkaly =

Malyye Karkaly Малые Каркалы
- Selo
- Location within Bashkortostan Location within Russia
- Coordinates: 53°30′N 54°57′E
- Country: Russia
- Region: Bashkortostan
- District: Miyakinsky District
- Time zone: UTC+5:00

Malyye Karkaly (Russian: Малые Каркалы; Bashkir: Кесе Кәркәле, Kese Kärkäle) is a rural locality (a selo) in Bolshekarkalinksy Selsoviet, Miyakinsky District, Bashkortostan, Russia. The population was 196 as of 2010. There are 4 streets.

== Geography ==
Malyye Karkaly is located 31 km southeast of Kirgiz-Miyaki (the district's administrative centre) by road. Bolshiye Karkaly is the nearest rural locality.
