= Kunakulovo =

Kunakulovo Кунакулово
- Selo
- Location within Bashkortostan Location within Russia
- Coordinates: 53°43′N 54°26′E
- Country: Russia
- Region: Bashkortostan
- District: Bizhbulyaksky District
- Time zone: UTC+5:00

Kunakulovo (Russian: Кунакулово; Bashkir: Ҡунаҡҡол, Qunaqqol) is a rural locality (a selo) in Kenger-Meneuzovsky Selsoviet, Bizhbulyaksky District, Bashkortostan, Russia. The population was 514 as of 2010. There are 2 streets.

== Geography ==
Kunakulovo is located 16 km northeast of Bizhbulyak (the district's administrative centre) by road. Kasimovka is the nearest rural locality.
