= Sofiyevka, Republic of Bashkortostan =

Sofiyevka Софиевка
- Village
- Location within Bashkortostan Location within Russia
- Coordinates: 53°43′N 55°07′E
- Country: Russia
- Region: Bashkortostan
- District: Miyakinsky District
- Time zone: UTC+5:00

Sofiyevka (Russian: Софиевка) is a rural locality (a village) in Karanovsky Selsoviet, Miyakinsky District, Bashkortostan, Russia. The population was 136 as of 2010. There are two streets.

== Geography ==
Sofiyevka is located 30 km northeast of Kirgiz-Miyaki (the district's administrative centre) by road. Zaypekul is the nearest rural locality.
