= Aznayevo =

Aznayevo Азнаево
- Selo
- Location within Bashkortostan Location within Russia
- Coordinates: 53°29′N 54°23′E
- Country: Russia
- Region: Bashkortostan
- District: Bizhbulyaksky District
- Time zone: UTC+5:00

Aznayevo (Russian: Азнаево; Bashkir: Аҙнай, Aźnay) is a rural locality (selo) in Dyomsky Selsoviet, Bizhbulyaksky District, Bashkortostan, Russia. The population was 411 as of 2010. It has 6 streets.

== Geography ==
Aznayevo is located 30 km south of Bizhbulyak (the district's administrative centre) by road. Dyomsky is the nearest rural locality.
