= Sarmandeyevka =

Village in Bashkortostan, Russia

Sarmandeyevka Сармандеевка
- Village
- Location within Bashkortostan Location within Russia
- Coordinates: 53°56′N 54°20′E
- Country: Russia
- Region: Bashkortostan
- District: Bizhbulyaksky District
- Time zone: UTC+5:00

Sarmandeyevka (Russian: Сармандеевка) is a rural locality (a village) in Kosh-Yelginsky Selsoviet, Bizhbulyaksky District, Bashkortostan, Russia. The population was 2 as of 2010. There is 1 street.

== Geography ==
Sarmandeyevka is located 53 km north of Bizhbulyak (the district's administrative centre) by road. Stepanovka and Vishnevka are the nearest rural localities.
