= Karyshevo =

Karyshevo Карышево
- Village
- Location within Bashkortostan Location within Russia
- Coordinates: 53°25′N 54°29′E
- Country: Russia
- Region: Bashkortostan
- District: Miyakinsky District
- Time zone: UTC+5:00

Karyshevo (Russian: Карышево; Bashkir: Кәреш, Käreş) is a rural locality (a village) in Zildyarovsky Selsoviet, Miyakinsky District, Bashkortostan, Russia. The population was 11 as of 2010. There is 1 street.

== Geography ==
Karyshevo is located 43 km southwest of Kirgiz-Miyaki (the district's administrative centre) by road. Islamgulovo is the nearest rural locality.
