= Aitovo =

Aitovo Аитово
- Selo
- Location within Bashkortostan Location within Russia
- Coordinates: 53°31′N 54°12′E
- Country: Russia
- Region: Bashkortostan
- District: Bizhbulyaksky District
- Time zone: UTC+5:00

Aitovo (Russian: Аитово; Bashkir: Айыт, Ayıt) is a rural locality (a selo) in and the administrative centre of Aitovsky Selsoviet, Bizhbulyaksky District, Bashkortostan, Russia. The population was 1,176 as of 2010. There are 22 streets.

== Geography ==
Aitovo is located 23 km south of Bizhbulyak (the district's administrative centre) by road. Yelbulaktamak is the nearest rural locality.
