= Dyusyanovo =

Dyusyanovo Дюсяново
- Selo
- Location within Bashkortostan Location within Russia
- Coordinates: 53°29′N 54°11′E
- Country: Russia
- Region: Bashkortostan
- District: Bizhbulyaksky District
- Time zone: UTC+5:00

Dyusyanovo (Russian: Дюсяново; Bashkir: Дүҫән, Düśän) is a rural locality (a selo) in Bikkulovsky Selsoviet, Bizhbulyaksky District, Bashkortostan, Russia. The population was 413 as of 2010.

== Geography ==
Dyusyanovo is located 28 km south of Bizhbulyak (the district's administrative centre) by road. Aitovo is the nearest rural locality.
