= Sukkul-Mikhaylovka =

Sukkul-Mikhaylovka Суккул-Михайловка
- Village
- Location within Bashkortostan Location within Russia
- Coordinates: 53°40′N 54°44′E
- Country: Russia
- Region: Bashkortostan
- District: Miyakinsky District
- Time zone: UTC+5:00

Sukkul-Mikhaylovka (Russian: Суккул-Михайловка; Bashkir: Һыуыҡҡул-Михайловка, Hıwıqqul-Mixaylovka) is a rural locality (a village) in Novokarmalinsky Selsoviet, Miyakinsky District, Bashkortostan, Russia. The population was 313 as of 2010. There are 3 streets.

== Geography ==
Sukkul-Mikhaylovka is located 8 km northwest of Kirgiz-Miyaki (the district's administrative centre) by road. Kyzyl-Chishma is the nearest rural locality.
