= Isyakayevo =

Isyakayevo Исякаево
- Selo
- Location within Bashkortostan Location within Russia
- Coordinates: 53°43′N 53°49′E
- Country: Russia
- Region: Bashkortostan
- District: Bizhbulyaksky District
- Time zone: UTC+5:00

Isyakayevo (Russian: Исякаево; Bashkir: Иҫәкәй, İśäkäy) is a rural locality (a selo) in Sukhorechensky Selsoviet, Bizhbulyaksky District, Bashkortostan, Russia. The population was 129 as of 2010. There are 4 streets.

== Geography ==
Isyakayevo is located 41 km west of Bizhbulyak (the district's administrative centre) by road. Shomyrtly is the nearest rural locality.
