= Bikkulovo, Bizhbulyaksky District, Republic of Bashkortostan =

Bikkulovo Биккулово
- Selo
- Location within Bashkortostan Location within Russia
- Coordinates: 53°26′N 54°10′E
- Country: Russia
- Region: Bashkortostan
- District: Bizhbulyaksky District
- Time zone: UTC+5:00

Bikkulovo (Russian: Биккулово; Bashkir: Биҡҡол, Biqqol) is a rural locality (a selo) and the administrative centre of Bikkulovsky Selsoviet, Bizhbulyaksky District, Bashkortostan, Russia. The population was 231 as of 2010. There are 5 streets.

== Geography ==
Bikkulovo is located 34 km south of Bizhbulyak (the district's administrative centre) by road. Naberezhny is the nearest rural locality.
