= Khomutovka, Republic of Bashkortostan =

Khomutovka Хомутовка
- Village
- Location within Bashkortostan Location within Russia
- Coordinates: 53°24′N 54°17′E
- Country: Russia
- Region: Bashkortostan
- District: Bizhbulyaksky District
- Time zone: UTC+5:00

Khomutovka (Russian: Хомутовка) is a rural locality (a village) in Dyomsky Selsoviet, Bizhbulyaksky District, Bashkortostan, Russia. The population was 245 as of 2010. There are 6 streets.

== Geography ==
Khomutovka is located 44 km south of Bizhbulyak (the district's administrative centre) by road. Naberezhny is the nearest rural locality.
