= Bikkulovo, Miyakinsky District, Republic of Bashkortostan =

Bikkulovo Биккулово
- Selo
- Location within Bashkortostan Location within Russia
- Coordinates: 53°44′N 54°53′E
- Country: Russia
- Region: Bashkortostan
- District: Miyakinsky District
- Time zone: UTC+5:00

Bikkulovo (Russian: Биккулово; Bashkir: Биҡҡол, Biqqol) is a rural locality (a selo) in Bikkulovsky Selsoviet, Miyakinsky District, Bashkortostan, Russia. The population was 200 as of 2010. There are 6 streets.

== Geography ==
Bikkulovo is located 26 km northeast of Kirgiz-Miyaki (the district's administrative centre) by road. Rassvet is the nearest rural locality.
