= Zirikly, Bizhbulyaksky District, Republic of Bashkortostan =

Zirikly Зириклы
- Selo
- Location within Bashkortostan Location within Russia
- Coordinates: 53°38′N 54°07′E
- Country: Russia
- Region: Bashkortostan
- District: Bizhbulyaksky District
- Time zone: UTC+5:00

Zirikly (Russian: Зириклы; Bashkir: Ерекле, Yerekle) is a rural locality (a selo) and the administrative centre of Ziriklinsky Selsoviet, Bizhbulyaksky District, Bashkortostan, Russia. The population was 506 as of 2010. There are 5 streets.

== Geography ==
Zirikly is located 14 km southwest of Bizhbulyak (the district's administrative centre) by road. Maly Sedyak is the nearest rural locality.
