= Meneuztamak =

Meneuztamak Менеузтамак
- Selo
- Location within Bashkortostan Location within Russia
- Coordinates: 53°42′20″N 54°31′21″E
- Country: Russia
- Region: Bashkortostan
- District: Miyakinsky District
- Time zone: UTC+5:00

Meneuztamak (Russian: Менеузтамак; Bashkir: Мәнәүезтамаҡ, Mänäweztamaq) is a rural locality (a selo) and the administrative centre of Meneuztamaksky Selsoviet, Miyakinsky District, Bashkortostan, Russia. The population was 878 as of 2010. There are 12 streets.

== Geography ==
Meneuztamak is located 28 km northwest of Kirgiz-Miyaki (the district's administrative centre) by road. Novomikhaylovka is the nearest rural locality.
