= Petrovka, Kosh-Yelginsky Selsoviet, Bizhbulyaksky District, Republic of Bashkortostan =

Petrovka Петровка
- Village
- Location within Bashkortostan Location within Russia
- Coordinates: 53°56′N 54°13′E
- Country: Russia
- Region: Bashkortostan
- District: Bizhbulyaksky District
- Time zone: UTC+5:00

Petrovka (Russian: Петровка) is a rural locality (a village) in Kosh-Yelginsky Selsoviet, Bizhbulyaksky District, Bashkortostan, Russia. The population was 139 as of 2010.

== Geography ==
It is located 22 km from Bizhbulyak.
