= Fish factory =

Facility where fish processing is performed

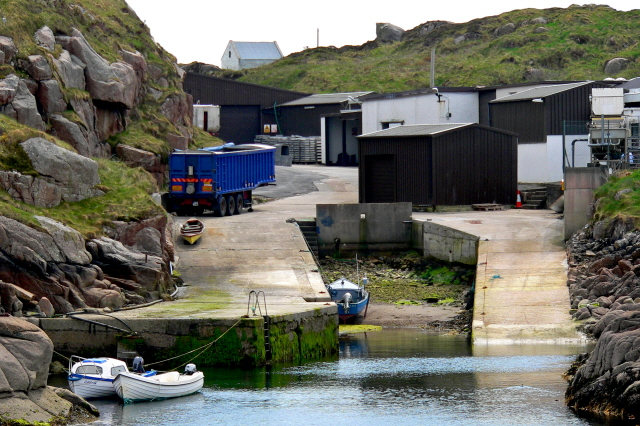
Small scale fish factory next to a pier at the NW end of the main road on the Kincasslagh Peninsula.

A fish factory, also known as a fish plant or fish processing facility, is a facility in which fish processing is performed. They are commonly located near bodies of water but can be located inland and on fishing vessels. The availability and variety of fish influences the scale of fish factories and the processing methods they utilize. The modernization of these facilities has promoted the use of machinery to increase production speed in order to meet the increasing global demand. Heightened demand has led to the increased production of fish and fish products which after processed result in large quantities of pollutants namely fish waste. Fish factories are held accountable for their product quality and are subject to a variety of health and safety regulations. Most regulations applicable to fish factories are limited, there are no universal regulations. Byproduct recovery is a method of waste mitigation that utilizes the waste produced by fish factories to produce other products and reduce the percentage of a fish's overall weight that becomes waste.

== Factory processing ==
A variety of seafood is processed in fish factories to produce a variety of seafood products: the desired parts of a fish (or other sea creature) are separated from the undesired parts, which are often unsuitable for human consumption. The details of the process vary according to the species and quality of the fish as well as the desired product; each species requires specific methods of processing to ensure consumer safety and product quality. There are many aspects to the process: sourcing, possessing, packaging, storage and transporting; every step ensures the quality of the seafood and adds value to the final product.

Fish factories are highly selective when sourcing fish for processing, as different species have different percentages of fats, bone, mass, and other desired components, making them better suited for certain products. After fish are processed, they are prepared and packaged for consumers and retailers. The packaging of the final product makes it more appealing to consumers and helps with storage and transportation; packaging prevents leakage, odor and contamination, thus increasing marketability and the overall value of the product. The highly perishable nature of seafood requires the refrigerated transportation of fresh fish and of the final product to and from fish factories to ensure product quality.

== Facilities ==
=== Appearance ===
Fish factories are indoor facilities that are temperature regulated, well ventilated, and often have multiple points of drainage. In most countries the interiors of fish factories are white or light colored, water resistant, have tall ceilings that increase capacity, and accommodate machinery. There are different processing stations, typically in separate rooms or individual areas. Cold storage areas and cooking areas are separated from other stations as they require independent temperature regulation. Equipment includes metal tables, wash basins, trays, buckets, crates, water hoses, conveyor belts, and other tools used for manual processing. Large machinery and water tanks are commonly found in larger facilities that can make use of their size. There may be multiple buildings, either interconnected or located close together. In addition to the main factory building(s), there may be storage facilities, loading areas, entrance and parking areas. If the factory is near a shore, it may also have a private docking area.

=== Location ===
The location of a fish factory will affect production by determining the availability of certain species of fish, the most frequently used methods of processing, investments made into processing equipment, and the products produced. Fish factories can be located inland, near bodies of water and on fishing vessels. Often fish factories are located on or near shores as the accessibility to fresh fish facilitates the transportation of fish to and from fish factories. Inland fish factories are limited in the variety of fish they can process due to the increased distance required for the transportation of fish, these factories are often located near fish farms which they may own or source their fish from. Fish factories can also be located on fishing vessels where fresh fish can be immediately processed to preserve the fish and extend its shelf life.

=== Size ===
Fish factories range in the size and in the variety of fish species which they process. The availability, variety, and profitability of local fish influences the scale of fish factories. Higher profitability and variety of local fish promotes larger operations such as industrialized fish factories that may consist of multiple buildings constructed on multiple acres, and facilitates smaller family owned and community-based operations. The scale of a fish factory influences its capacity for processing and in general its annual profits, choosing methods that are best suited for their scale maximizes profits. Large factories utilize machinery to increase production speed and profitability while smaller factories mainly focus on manual labor to reduce operation cost increase their profits. Smaller fish factories tend to focus on producing a limited variety of products as most of their profits are made from local and regional sales; larger fish factories produce a greater variety of products and process a larger range of fish species to meet national and global demand.

=== Sourcing ===
Some species of fish, such as mackerel and herring, can be caught at sea by large pelagic trawlers and offloaded to fisheries and fish factories within a few days of being caught. Alternatively, fish can be caught by factory ships which are offshore fish factories that can do the processing themselves on board. Some fish factories have fishing vessels that catch fish for them at certain times of the year. This has to do with conflicting quotas and seasons that restrict when certain fish can be landed and how much can be caught within those time frames. Wild caught fish from fisheries and fishing vessels provide a significant amount of seafood to the fish processing industry, but cannot keep up with global demand.

Aquaculture, also referred to as fish farming, is a method of fish production where fish are raised in large tanks or manmade bodies of water in order to supplement the global demand for fish that wild caught fish cannot fulfill. Fish factories require secure and reliable sourcing in order to ensure product quality; building relations with fish farms has proven beneficial for fish factories as they are reliable sources that can provide large quantities of fish. The mutually beneficial relationship between these two industries has led to the connecting of some fish factories and fish farms, which allows factories to secure sufficient product to meet demands.

=== Older vs newer factories ===
Due to the difficulty of preserving seafood and the easier access to water older factories would be located on coasts, riverbanks and lake shores. However, newer factories can also be located further inland. The improvement of refrigeration in transportation has improved the preservation of seafood allowing it to be processed further inland. Additionally, modern methods of ground water pumping and plumbing provide greater accessibility to water allowing factories to be located further from rivers, lakes and shores.

Some of the oldest fish factories were outdoor facilities made of stone and wood, housing large wash basins and tables where delicate manual processing would take place. As architectural methods of construction and technology improved eventually fish factories developed into tall, structurally re-enforced indoor facilities utilizing machinery and modern plumbing. The technological advancement of machinery, ventilation, temperature regulation, and plumbing led to the modernization of fish factories, increasing the use of machinery in processing facilities. Some processes can be fully automated with the use of modern machinery, but others require more traditional methods of delicate and intensive manual labor.

== Product demand and pollution ==
Global demand for seafood has seen a steady increase over the years, this increasing demand has led to an increase in fish processing and demand from fish factories. The high global demand for seafood production has generated large quantities of fish waste most commonly in the form of fish discards. Some fish species contain large portions that are non-edible; after processing 20%-70% of a fish's overall weight is discarded and becomes waste which contributes to the high levels of unavoidable fish waste derived from fish processing in factories. The total annual production of fish in any given year is used to estimate the expected fish waste produced. In 2016, it was estimated that 73 million tons of fish were produced worldwide. Based on that statistic, it was estimated that the waste produced that year was between 52-80 million tons. The large quantities of fish waste produced annually are a result of the growing demand from the global market for the production of millions of tons of fish every year.

The fish processing industry utilizes a considerable amount of energy and contributes to various global waste issues. The consumption of energy used to operate machinery in fish factories and transport products produces carbon emissions and pollutants. The processing of fish results in both liquid and solid fish wastes in addition to contaminated water. Fish waste is often discarded in landfills and into coastal waters. Improper mitigation of waste and pollutant emotions from fish processing contributes to global warming and impacts local ecosystems. The dumping practices for solid and liquid fish waste by fish factories in particular carry damaging effects for local environments. Dumping can alter natural food webs and contribute to increased levels of carbon and nitrogen present in an ecosystems. Coastal dumping in particular can increase oxygen consumption and negatively impacting biodiversity in the ocean and reducing the density of key organisms like benthos, plankton and nekton.

Landfilling and dumping are common methods for the disposal of seafood by-products, generally these methods are regulated or restricted to some extent in most countries, but they are not applied uniformly across the fish processing industry and fish factories. Small scale and remote factories can receive exemptions from landfilling restrictions and regulations due to convenience based on their location and lower output of waste in relation to larger facilities. Fish waste has the potential to impact local environments and marine environments, this potential is the reason why countries and unions create regulations to manage waste and reduce potentially harmful waste practices. Existing waste management regulations are limited however, each country sets its own standards and regulations making universally enforced waste management practices non-existent.

== Health and safety regulations ==
Much like waste management regulations, health and safety regulations vary by country. Regulatory bodies, local agencies and organizations like the Food and Agriculture Organization or the World Health Organization of the United Nations enforce health and safety standards on fish factories. Prominent regulations that are most commonly enforced apply to water quality, machinery, facilities and employed workers.

- Water quality: Regulatory bodies require the use of clean water throughout fish processing and sanitization. The general standard for water quality is the same as the standard for safe drinking water.
- Machinery: Regulations which apply to machinery require that it be possible to thoroughly clean and sanitize all parts and crevasses. The lubricants applied to machinery should not come in contact with the products and all machinery should be cleaned before and after use including times when the species of fish being processed is changed.
- Facility: Fish factory facilities are required to be designed in a way that accommodates to the many health and safety standards they are expected to meet. Some facility requirements include a water-resistant interior that is also insect and rodent proof, disinfectant resistant floors that are slip proof, a white or light-colored interior, separate cold storage, proper drainage and temperature regulation. The layout of fish factories is expected to be designed in a way that prevents cross contamination by separating the different stages of processing into divided areas within the facility.
- Employees: Employees are required to maintain proper hygiene practices, wear all necessary protective gear, and are prohibited from carrying unregulated substances or personal items outside of designated areas. Mandated reporting of any infectious conditions or superficial injuries is enforced to prevent contamination.

According to the U.S. Department of Labor, Bureau of Labor Statistics, in 2011-2017 seafood processing workers had an injury-illness rate of 6,670 per 100,000 workers, the highest rate for injury-illness out of all U.S. maritime workers. The hazardous nature of fish factories and processing facilities exposes employees to various health and safety risks, the regulations enforced on workers serve to protect their health and safety while preserving the quality of the product they handle.

=== Producer accountability ===
The quality of a product is the responsibility of the producer; potential contaminants such as disinfectants, local chemical contaminants and seafood contaminants can compromise the quality and safety of a product. It is the responsibility of a factory to monitor potential contaminants to ensure the safety and quality of their products; implementing quality control and following regulations at every step of the processing ensures product safety.

== Use of byproducts ==
The unrecognized value of perceived waste contributes to industrial waste from fish processing industry. According to the FAO, the estimated production of fish in 2000 was 131 million tones, and about 26% of that was not used for human consumption and instead used to make other products such as fish oils and fish meal. A lot of the millions of tons of fish produced annually is not suitable for human consumption, and becomes fish discards and waste when processed. These discards can be used to make other products. Currently only a fraction of such discards are used; these by-products contain various extractable organic compounds that go unused and are often discarded as waste. Use of this material reduces waste.

The general quality of a fish encompasses health, nutrition, age and species. These factors impact the nutritional value and the proportion of extractible organic compounds such as oils, lipids, fats, and collagen which can be obtained from a fish and its byproducts. Different species have higher or lower contents of desired components and compounds; this influences how much of their weight becomes waste and impacts its byproduct usability for different purposes.

- Fertilizer: Fish byproducts can be used to produce both solid and liquid fertilizers. Solid fish waste can be composted, added whole or grounded and placed on soil to add nutrients. Fish waste can also be emulsified and used to create fish based liquid fertilizers.
- Pet food: The extractable components from processed fish discards can be used to add nutritive value when producing and processing pet food. Fish discards can be further processed to extract nutritious components like fish intestines, cartilage and bone that can provide calcium, phosphorus and protein which enriches the dietary value of pet food.
- Animal feed: Fish waste including fish entrails, feces, and bones can be processed into animal feed such as fish meal and silage. Fish meal is made by drying and grinding fish waste to extract oils and produce a powder substance that is high in protein. Fish sileage is made by using chemicals to activate enzymes present in the fish to liquify fish waste and break down proteins to produce a liquid.
- Biofuel: Fish waste can be used to produce fish-based biofuel. Through the process of transesterification, low-cost fish oils can be converted into sustainable fuel. Research indicates further need for development before it can be used as a viable substitute for commercial fossil fuels.
- Fish oil: High contents of oil are found in most fish, it is one of the most common byproducts of fish processing. Fish oils make up 6-12% of effluents, these oils are extractable and can be utilized in various ways within the food, cosmetic and pharmaceutical industries.
- Coagulants: Specific milk-clotting enzymes can be found in fish and fish waste. When isolated these enzymes can be used to produce a rennet substitute that can be used in cheese making.
- Supplements: Fish waste contains a variety of chemical components such as proteins, lipids, enzymes, and collagen. These components can be used in the production of supplements in the food and drug industries as alternatives to mammalian sources.
- Natural pigments: Fish discards contain natural pigments that can replace synthetic pigments used in feed formulations. Carotenoids are a common type of pigment found in seafood responsible for the orange-red color in fish flesh and shellfish protective shells, to an extent this pigment can be extracted from fish discards and utilized in the production of natural pigments.

== Gallery ==
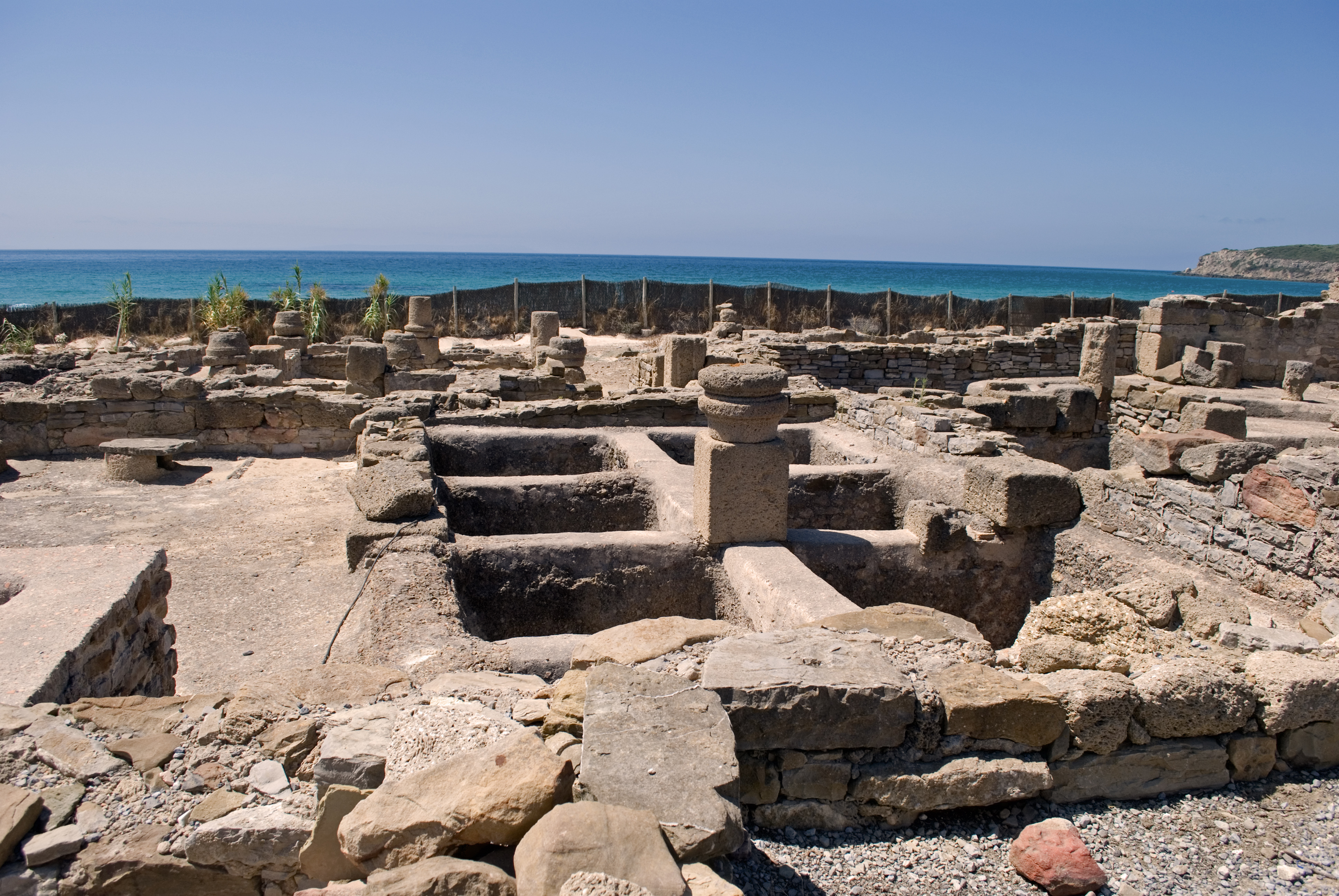
Remains of an ancient garum fish factory at Baelo Claudia, in Spain. This Spanish garum was exported to Ancient Rome.

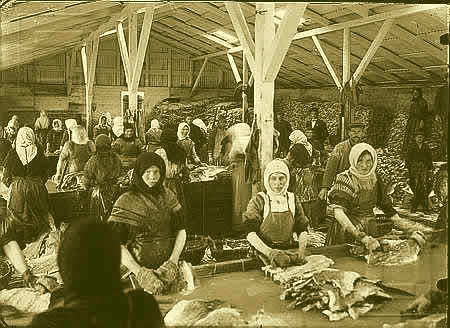
Women working with stock fish in a fish factory in Kirkjusandur, Reykjavík, Iceland, around 1910–1920

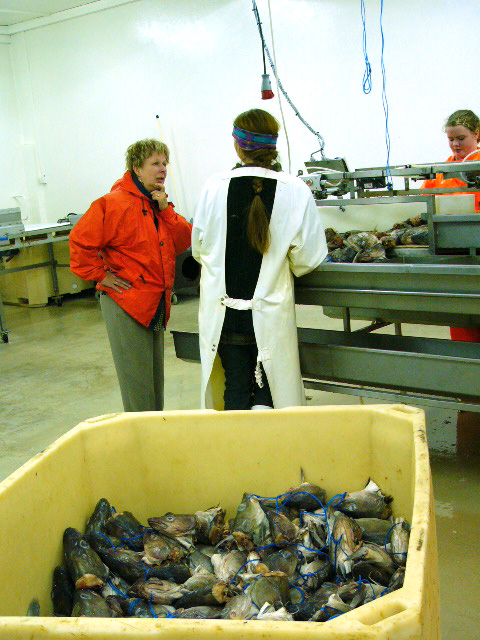
Women working in a modern fish factory in Halteyri, Iceland

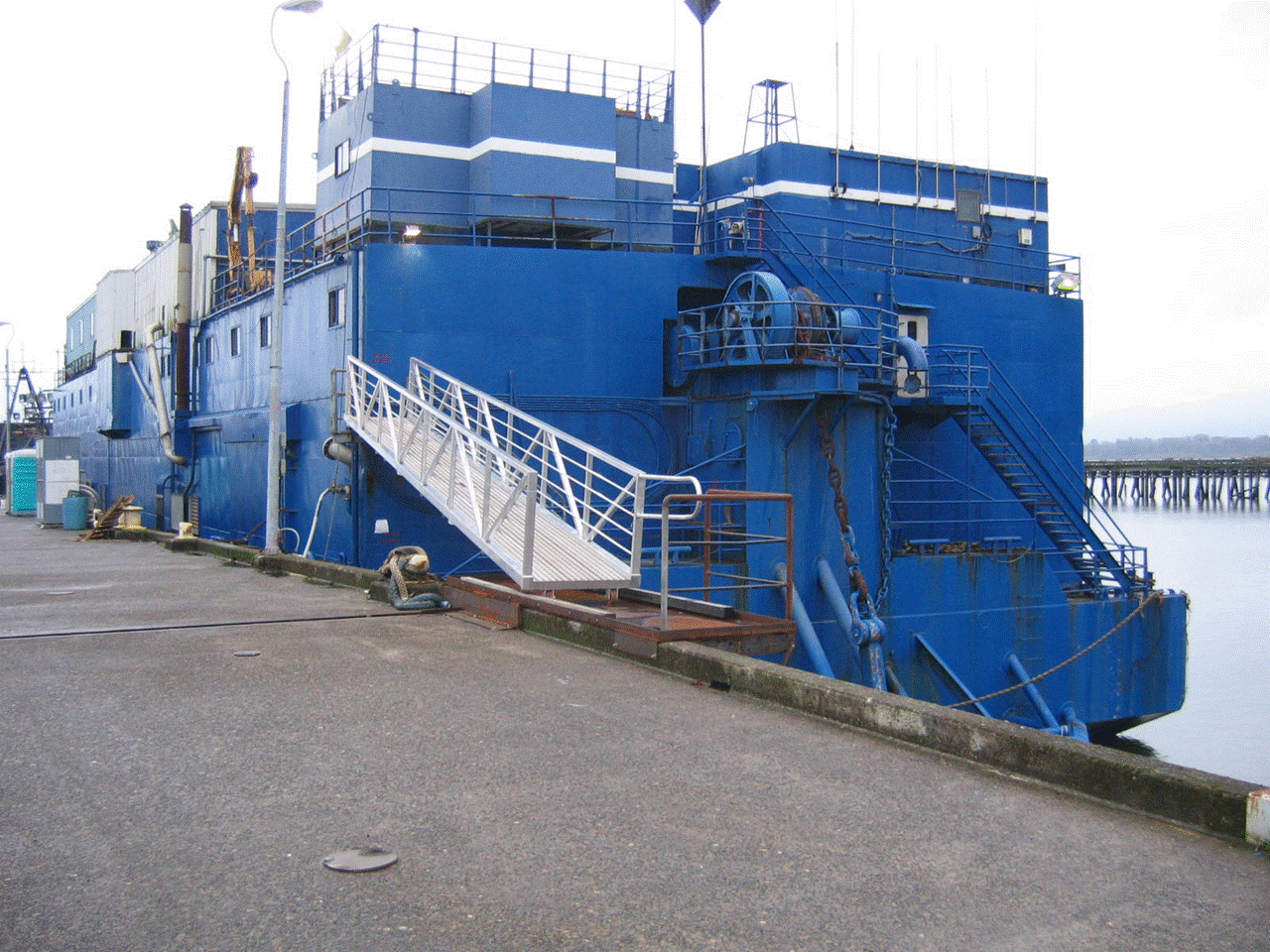
Floating fish processor Atlantis

== See also ==
- Cannery Row
- Factory ship
- Fish company
- Gulf of Georgia Cannery
- List of harvested aquatic animals by weight
