= Khomutovka, Bryansk Oblast =

Khomutovka Хомутовка
- Village
- Location within Bryansk Oblast Location within Russia
- Coordinates: 52°28′N 32°55′E
- Country: Russia
- Region: Bryansk Oblast
- District: Starodubsky District
- Time zone: UTC+3:00

Khomutovka (Russian: Хомутовка) is a rural locality (a village) in Starodubsky District, Bryansk Oblast, Russia. The population was 109 as of 2010. There are 5 streets.

== Geography ==
Khomutovka is located 19 km southeast of Starodub (the district's administrative centre) by road. Mishkovka is the nearest rural locality.
