= Bikkulovo, Chishminsky District, Republic of Bashkortostan =

Bikkulovo Биккулово
- Village
- Location within Bashkortostan Location within Russia
- Coordinates: 54°27′N 55°19′E
- Country: Russia
- Region: Bashkortostan
- District: Chishminsky District
- Time zone: UTC+5:00

Bikkulovo (Russian: Биккулово; Bashkir: Биҡҡол, Biqqol) is a rural locality (a village) in Durasovsky Selsoviet, Chishminsky District, Bashkortostan, Russia. The population was 120 as of 2010. The village has 3 streets.

== Geography ==
Bikkulovo is located 26 km south of Chishmy, the district's administrative centre. Penza is the nearest rural locality.
