= Bikkulovo, Sharansky District, Republic of Bashkortostan =

Bikkulovo Биккулово
- Village
- Location within Bashkortostan Location within Russia
- Coordinates: 54°51′N 54°08′E
- Country: Russia
- Region: Bashkortostan
- District: Sharansky District
- Time zone: UTC+5:00

Bikkulovo (Russian: Биккулово; Bashkir: Биҡҡол, Biqqol) is a rural locality (a village) in Akbarisovsky Selsoviet, Sharansky District, Bashkortostan, Russia. The population was 47 as of 2010. There is 1 street.

== Geography ==
Bikkulovo is located 10 km northeast of Sharan (the district's administrative centre) by road. Ursayevo is the nearest rural locality.
