= Bikkulovo, Abzelilovsky District, Republic of Bashkortostan =

Bikkulovo Биккулово
- Village
- Location within Bashkortostan Location within Russia
- Coordinates: 53°39′N 58°42′E
- Country: Russia
- Region: Bashkortostan
- District: Abzelilovsky District
- Time zone: UTC+5:00

Bikkulovo (Russian: Биккулово; Bashkir: Биҡҡол, Biqqol) is a rural locality (a village) in Tashbulatovsky Selsoviet, Abzelilovsky District, Bashkortostan, Russia. The population was 292 as of 2010. There are 5 streets.

== Geography ==
Bikkulovo is located 53 km north of Askarovo (the district's administrative centre) by road. Telyashevo is the nearest rural locality.
