= Fish company =

Company that processes fish products

A fish company is a company which specializes in the processing of fish products. Fish that are processed by a fish company include cod, hake, haddock, tuna, herring, mackerel, salmon and pollock.

The United States, China, Peru and Chile have the highest number of fish companies specializing in fish processing. The Northwest Pacific Ocean is considered to be the most vital fishing zone in terms of volume caught and processed which results in the United States being regarded as the number one fish producing country.

In developing countries, the livelihood of over 500 million people depends on fish and seafood products.

== Processing of fish ==
Stages in the processing of fish species are:

- sorting
- dressing
- cutting
- eviscerating
- skinning
- pre-cooking
- breading
- spicing
- blanching
- filleting
- salting
- packing

The steps that are applied by fish companies in the production of fish are:

- pretreatment
- filleting
- grading and trimming
- package
- storage

Fish processing can occur on the boat and fish processing vessels, and at fish processing plants.

=== Processing of whitefish ===
Whitefish is a fishery term used to define species with fins such as cod, hake, whiting, haddock and pollock. White fish has dry and white flesh and is easy to fillet.

Unlike oily fish, whitefish contains oil in their liver and therefore the fish can be gutted, trimmed and de-headed immediately after being caught, that is on the fishing vessel. After this process, the fish are kept in boxes and kept frozen by placing it on ice.

Upon arrival at the processing plant the fish are freed from ice and kept in chilled storage so as to preserve the fish for further processing. The fish are cleaned for blood, bones fins, black membrane, and fleas, loose fish scales, de-headed and graded according to the required size. This is known as the pretreatment and trimming stage.

The filleting process of the fish starts after the pretreatment and trimming stage. Fish filleting is either done by mechanical filleting machine or by hand. The machine which is used for the production of fish fillet has cutting knives which cut the fillet from the backbone and take out the collarbone. The filleting department and the pretreatment department are always separated from each other because ensures that workers from non-sterile pretreatment area are not coming across the hygienic filleting care area.

The trimming department is controlled by operational inspectors to ensure that the company has met the safety principles and procedures. If defects are found, corrective actions are taken by the food safety management. This is known as Hazard Analysis Critical Control Points (HACCP).

After the filleting process, skinning of the fish takes place and then the fish fillet is processed into end products such as frozen fish fillet, moulded loins fillet or smoked fish fillet.

The fish fillet may be divided into fish loins, fish fillet tail, etc. It is then packed in blocks and kept in cold storage.

=== Processing of oily fish ===
Oily fish have oils throughout their tissues and around the gut. Examples of oily fish are salmon, tuna, mackerel, herring and anchovy.

Oily fish is not headed and gutted on the fishing vessel because it contains oil and this can be hazardous as it will lead to oily surfaces. Thus, to minimize risk, oily fish are processed at the fish processing plant itself. The filleting process is almost the same the whitefish but oily fish is mostly used as canned fish.

=== Filleting by hand ===
In some fish companies, fish filleting is done manually. This way of fish processing involves high labor costs.

During the processing of fish fillet, the stages are same as the processing of whitefish but the fish are filleted by hand rather than machine. The fish is headed, gutted, de-iced and de-scaled. It is then graded and filleted by hand. After the processing phase, the fish fillet is trimmed for blood, bones fins, black membrane, fleas, loose fish scales and sorted. It is then packed and kept frozen in cold storage.

== Food safety ==
Fish companies need food safety certification to ensure that the processing has been carried out in a healthy manner. One of the common certifications is Hazard Analysis Critical Control Points) (HACCP).

HACCP is a system which identifies hazards and implements measures for their control. It was developed in 1960 by NASA to ensure food safety for the crewed space program. The main objectives of NASA were to prevent food safety problems and control food borne diseases. HACCP has been used by the food industry since the late 1970.

HACCP is certified by the:

- FAO (Food and Agriculture Organization)
- Codex Alimentarius (a commission of the United Nations),
- FDA (US Food and Drug Administration),
- European Union
- WHO (World Health Organization)

There are seven elements to HACCP:

- conduct a hazard analysis.
- after assessing all the processing steps, the Critical Control Point (CCP) is controlled. CCP are points which determine and control significant hazards in a food manufacturing process.
- set up critical limits in order to ensure that the hazard identified is being controlled effectively.
- establish a system so as to monitor the CCP.
- establish corrective actions where the critical limit has not been met. Actions need to be taken which can be on a short or long-term basis. Records must be kept.
- establish authentication procedures so as to confirm if the principles imposed by HACCP documents are being respected and all records are being taken.
- analyze if the HACCP plans are working effectively.

== Sustainability ==
Fish consumption is increasing worldwide. Millions of people are dependent to fish products as fish consists of protein and is a good meal for health. In order to safeguard fish stocks, fish companies have to join certifications which will contribute to sustainable fishing.

Common certifications are:

- Marine Stewardship Council
- Friend of the Sea

=== Marine Stewardship Council ===
Marine Stewardship council is a non-profit organization that works with fisheries and seafood companies in order to contribute to the marine environment by recognizing and rewarding sustainable fishing practices. MSC also educates the population about the importance of choosing sustainable seafood and how they can contribute to the marine ecosystem.

The MSC program is based on three main principles:

- managing fish stock
- minimize the impacts of the ecosystem
- good fishery management system

Fish Company acquires the MSC eco-label only if the seafood product is traceable from boat to plate. This is called the Chain of Custody. The traceability process ensures that consumers are getting what they are paying for, which means that the seafood they are purchasing has been fished sustainably. The bar codes on the fish products can be traced back from consumers to supplier in case of any problem related to the consumed product.

The MSC chain of custody certification is validated on a three years basis so as to ensure that the fish company continues to catch fish in sustainable ways and their loyalty to sustainable seafood has been maintained.

Nowadays, customers find the MSC blue label on more than 600 products worldwide. There has also been 76 percent increase in worldwide sales of MSC labeled products as compared to 2009.

=== Friend of the Sea ===
Friend of the Sea is an international non-governmental organization which seeks to safeguard the marine ecosystem by working with fisheries and fish companies. Friend of the Sea works in conjunction with the article 30 FAO Guidelines for Ecolabelling of Marine Fisheries.

The article states that seafood products can only be certified if the targeted species is not over-exploited. To achieve Friend of the Sea certification, fisheries need to abide with the following criteria:

- marine species should not be over-fished
- the method of fishing should not impact the seafloor
- the method of fishing should generate a maximum of 8% discards
- all laws and regulations should be respected
- endangered species should not be by-catch

=== Usage ===
- Fish
- Fishing industry

== See also ==
- Fish fillet processor
- Fish factory
- Seafood products
