= Churayevo, Alsheyevsky District, Republic of Bashkortostan =

Churayevo Чураево
- Village
- Location within Bashkortostan Location within Russia
- Coordinates: 53°59′N 55°00′E
- Country: Russia
- Region: Bashkortostan
- District: Alsheyevsky District
- Time zone: UTC+5:00

Churayevo (Russian: Чураево; Bashkir: Сурай, Suray) is a rural locality (a village) in Karmyshevsky Selsoviet, Alsheyevsky District, Bashkortostan, Russia. The population was 386 as of 2010. There are 5 streets.

== Geography ==
Churayevo is located 16 km southeast of Rayevsky (the district's administrative centre) by road. Karmyshevo is the nearest rural locality.
