= Bizhbulyak =

Bizhbulyak Бижбуляк
- Selo

Other transcription(s)
  - Bashkir: Бишбүләк
- Interactive map of Bizhbulyak
- Location of Bizhbulyak Bizhbulyak (Bashkortostan)
- Coordinates: 53°41′40″N 54°16′07″E
- Country: Russia
- Federal subject: Bashkortostan
- Administrative district: Bizhbulyaksky District
- SelsovietSelsoviet: Bizhbulyaksky Selsoviet
- Founded: 1640
- Elevation: 252 m (827 ft)

Population (2010 Census)
  - Total: 6,446
  - Estimate (2010): 6,446 (0%)

Administrative status
  - Capital of: Bizhbulyaksky District, Bizhbulyaksky Selsoviet

Municipal status
  - Municipal district: Bizhbulyaksky Municipal District
  - Rural settlement: Bizhbulyaksky Selsoviet Rural Settlement
  - Capital of: Bizhbulyaksky Municipal District, Bizhbulyaksky Selsoviet Rural Settlement
- Time zone: UTC+5 (MSK+2)
- Postal code: 452040
- OKTMO ID: 80612410101

Bizhbulyak (Russian: Бижбуля́к, Bashkir: Бишбүләк, Bişbüläk) is a rural locality (a selo) and the administrative center of Bizhbulyaksky District of the Republic of Bashkortostan, Russia. Population: 6,446 (2010 census); 6,373 (2002 census); 5,926 (1989 Soviet census).
