= Bizhbulyaksky District =

Bizhbulyaksky District Бижбулякский район (Russian)
- District

Other transcription(s)
  - Bashkir: Бишбүләк районы
  - Chuvash: Пишпӳлек районӗ
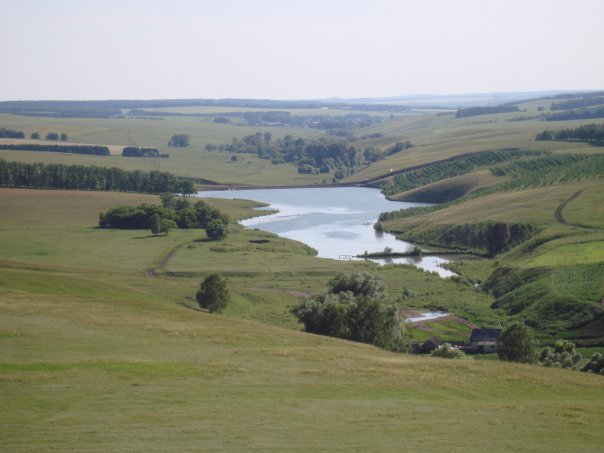
- Pond on Sedyak river, village Sedyakbash, Bizhbulyaksky District

- Flag Coat of arms
- Location of Bizhbulyaksky District in the Republic of Bashkortostan
- Coordinates: 53°41′N 54°16′E
- Country: Russia
- Federal subject: Republic of Bashkortostan
- Established: 1930
- Administrative center: Bizhbulyak

Area
  - Total: 2,133.9 km^{2} (823.9 sq mi)

Population (2010 Census)
  - Total: 26,080
  - Density: 12.22/km^{2} (31.65/sq mi)
  - Urban: 0%
  - Rural: 100%

Administrative structure
  - Administrative divisions: 13 Selsoviets
  - Inhabited localities: 85 rural localities

Municipal structure
  - Municipally incorporated as: Bizhbulyaksky Municipal District
  - Municipal divisions: 0 urban settlements, 13 rural settlements
- Time zone: UTC+5 (MSK+2)
- OKTMO ID: 80612000
- Website: http://adm-bizhbulyak.ru

Population of Bizhbulyaksky District
- 2010 Census: 26,080
- 2002 Census: 27,999
- 1989 Census: 27,847
- 1979 Census: 32,887

Bizhbulyaksky District (Russian: Бижбуля́кский райо́н; Bashkir: Бишбүләк районы, Bişbüläk rayonı; Chuvash: Пишпӳлек районӗ, Pişpülek rayonĕ; Tatar: Бишбүләк районы, Bişbüläk rayonı) is an administrative and municipal district (raion), one of the fifty-four in the Republic of Bashkortostan, Russia. It is located in the west of the republic and borders with Belebeyevsky District in the north, Alsheyevsky District in the northeast, Miyakinsky District in the east, Orenburg Oblast in the south and west, and with Yermekeyevsky District in the northwest. The area of the district is 2,133.9 square kilometers (823.9 sq mi). Its administrative center is the rural locality (a selo) of Bizhbulyak. As of the 2010 Census, the total population of the district was 26,080, with the population of Bizhbulyak accounting for 24.7% of that number.

== History ==
The district was established in 1930.

== Administrative and municipal status ==
Within the framework of administrative divisions, Bizhbulyaksky District is one of the fifty-four in the Republic of Bashkortostan. The district is divided into thirteen selsoviets, comprising eighty-five rural localities. As a municipal division, the district is incorporated as Bizhbulyaksky Municipal District. Its thirteen selsoviets are incorporated as thirteen rural settlements within the municipal district. The selo of Bizhbulyak serves as the administrative center of both the administrative and municipal district.

== See also ==
- Zirikly
