= Kirgiz-Miyaki =

Coordinates: 53°38′N 54°47′E

Kirgiz-Miyaki (Russian: Кирги́з-Мияки́; Bashkir: Ҡырғыҙ-Миәкә, Qırğıź-Miäkä) is a rural locality (a selo) and the administrative center of Miyakinsky District of the Republic of Bashkortostan, Russia. Population: 7,658 (2002 census); 6,905 (1989 Soviet census).

There are two secondary schools, one movie theater, a palace of culture, a milk factory, and a fish company in the village.

The village was founded in the 18th century.
