= Miyakinsky District =

Miyakinsky District Миякинский район (Russian)
- District

Other transcription(s)
  - Bashkir: Миәкә районы
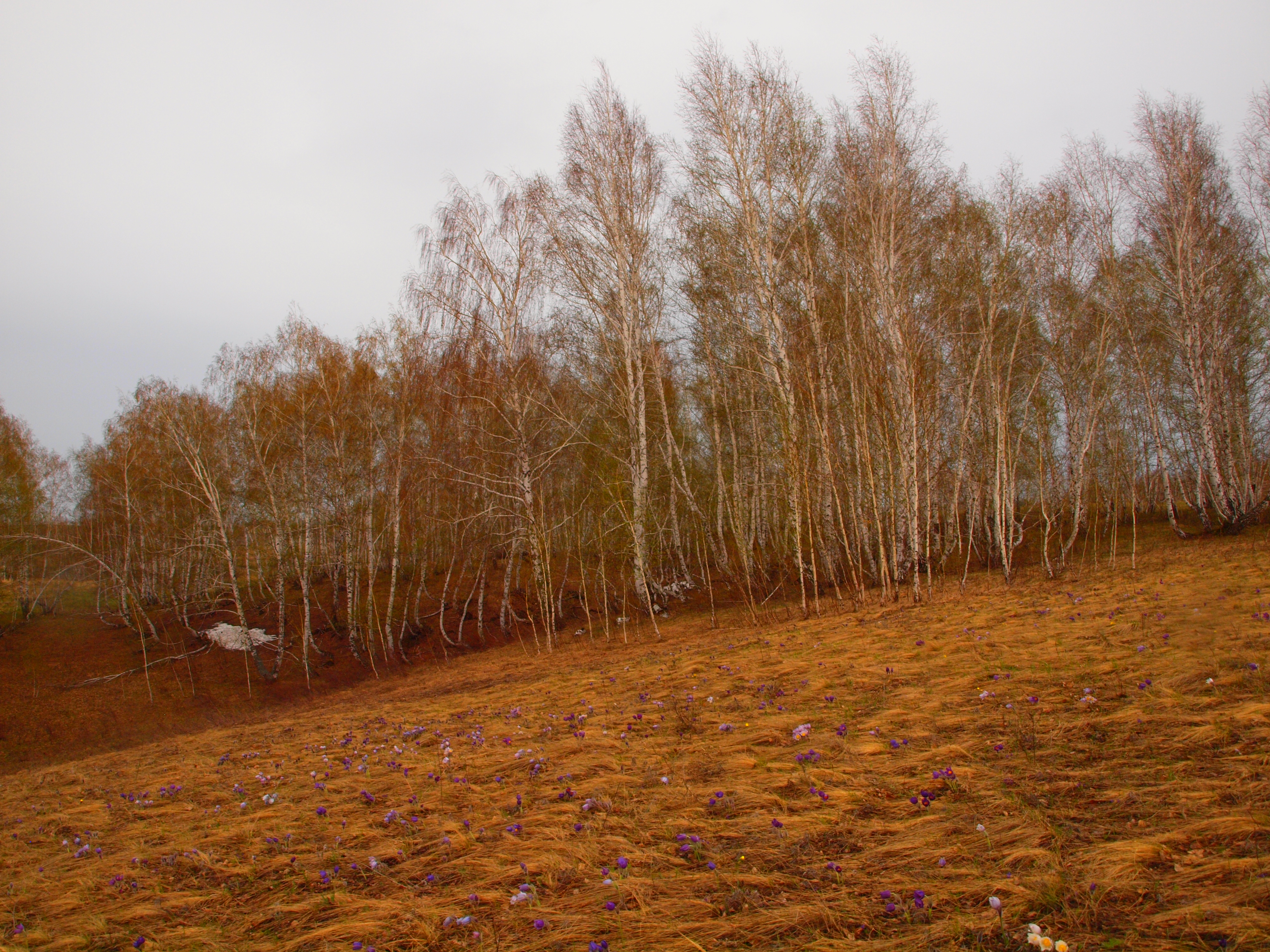
- Birch forest, Miyakinsky District

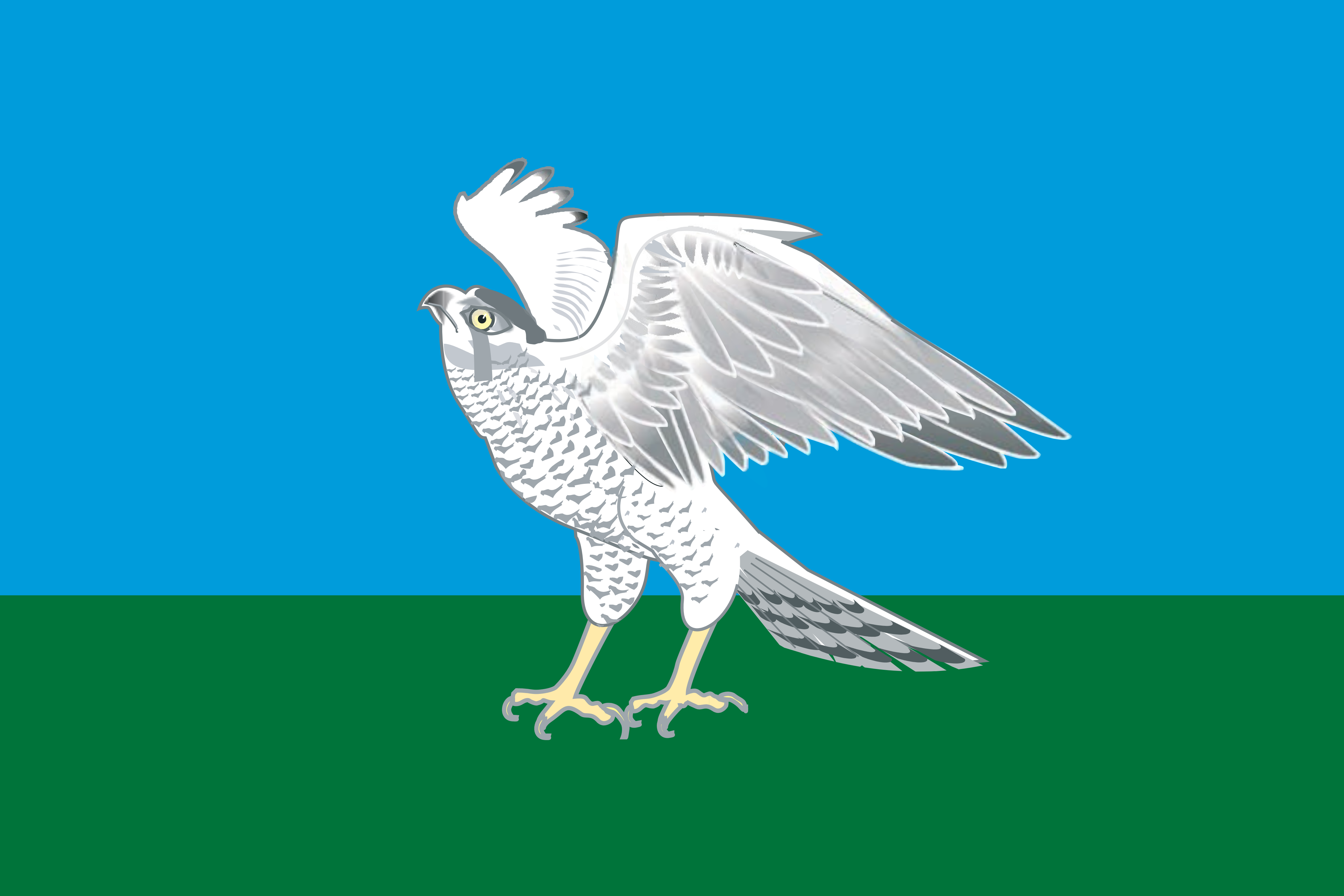
- Flag Coat of arms
- Location of Miyakinsky District in the Republic of Bashkortostan
- Coordinates: 53°38′N 54°47′E
- Country: Russia
- Federal subject: Republic of Bashkortostan
- Established: August 20, 1930 (first); January 13, 1965 (second)
- Administrative center: Kirgiz-Miyaki

Area
  - Total: 2,051.28 km^{2} (792.00 sq mi)

Population (2010 Census)
  - Total: 28,224
  - Estimate (2018): 25,212 (−10.7%)
  - Density: 13.759/km^{2} (35.636/sq mi)
  - Urban: 0%
  - Rural: 100%

Administrative structure
  - Administrative divisions: 15 Selsoviets
  - Inhabited localities: 96 rural localities

Municipal structure
  - Municipally incorporated as: Miyakinsky Municipal District
  - Municipal divisions: 0 urban settlements, 15 rural settlements
- Time zone: UTC+5 (MSK+2)
- OKTMO ID: 80644000
- Website: http://www.miyakirb.ru

Population of Miyakinsky District
- 2010 Census: 28,224
- 2002 Census: 31,789
- 1989 Census: 30,241
- 1979 Census: 33,984

Miyakinsky District (Russian: Мия́кинский райо́н; Bashkir: Миәкә районы, Miäkä rayonı; Tatar: Миякә районы, Miyakä rayonı) is an administrative and municipal district (raion), one of the fifty-four in the Republic of Bashkortostan, Russia. It is located in the west of the republic and borders with Alsheyevsky District in the north, Sterlitamaksky District in the east, Sterlibashevsky District in the east and south, Orenburg Oblast in the southwest, and with Bizhbulyaksky District in the west. The area of the district is 2,051.28 square kilometers (792.00 sq mi). Its administrative center is the rural locality (a selo) of Kirgiz-Miyaki. As of the 2010 Census, the total population of the district was 28,224, with the population of Kirgiz-Miyaki accounting for 26.5% of that number.

== History ==
The district was established on August 20, 1930 as Kirgiz-Miyakinsky District (Киргиз-Миякинский район). On February 20, 1932, parts of the district were transferred to Aurgazinsky, Davlekanovsky, Karagushevsky, and Sterlitamaksky Districts; at the same time, three villages in Davlekanovsky District were appended to Kirgiz-Miyakinsky District. On January 31, 1935, a major part of the district was split among other districts and the remaining territory was renamed Miyakinsky District. One selsoviet was transferred to Aznayevsky District in 1940 and another one to Bizhbulyaksky District in 1947. On May 7, 1953, two rural localities were transferred to Sterlibashevsky District, and on June 4, 1953, one rural locality was transferred to Miyakinsky District from Bizhbulyaksky District. On February 1, 1963, Miyakinsky District was merged into Alsheyevsky District, but this was reversed on January 13, 1965. The external borders of the district have remained unchanged ever since.

== Administrative and municipal status ==
Within the framework of administrative divisions, Miyakinsky District is one of the fifty-four in the Republic of Bashkortostan. The district is divided into fifteen selsoviets, comprising ninety-six rural localities. As a municipal division, the district is incorporated as Miyakinsky Municipal District. Its fifteen selsoviets are incorporated as fifteen rural settlements within the municipal district. The selo of Kirgiz-Miyaki serves as the administrative center of both the administrative and municipal district.
