= Durasovo =

Durasovo may refer to several places in Russia:

- Durasovo, Belebeyevsky District, Republic of Bashkortostan
- Durasovo, Chishminsky District, Republic of Bashkortostan
- Durasovo, Sheksninsky District, Vologda Oblast
- Durasovo, Vashkinsky District, Vologda Oblast
- Durasovo, Vladimir Oblast
