= Kavetka =

Kavetka Каветка
- Village
- Location within Bashkortostan Location within Russia
- Coordinates: 54°37′N 55°18′E
- Country: Russia
- Region: Bashkortostan
- District: Chishminsky District
- Time zone: UTC+5:00

Kavetka (Russian: Каветка) is a rural locality (a village) in Yeremeyevsky Selsoviet, Chishminsky District, Bashkortostan, Russia. The village has 5 streets and, as of 2010, a population of 30.

== Geography ==
Kavetka lies 8 km northwest of Chishmy, the district's administrative centre. Yeremeyevo is the nearest rural locality.
