= Sharipovo, Kushnarenkovsky District, Republic of Bashkortostan =

Sharipovo Шарипово
- Selo
- Location within Bashkortostan Location within Russia
- Coordinates: 54°57′N 55°32′E
- Country: Russia
- Region: Bashkortostan
- District: Kushnarenkovsky District
- Time zone: UTC+5:00

Sharipovo (Russian: Шарипово; Bashkir: Шәрип, Şärip) is a rural locality (a selo) and the administrative centre of Sharipovsky Selsoviet, Kushnarenkovsky District, Bashkortostan, Russia. The population was 648 as of 2010. There are 14 streets.

== Geography ==
Sharipovo is located 26 km southeast of Kushnarenkovo (the district's administrative centre) by road. Sredneakbashevo is the nearest rural locality.
