= Novobakayevo, Kushnarenkovsky District, Republic of Bashkortostan =

Novobakayevo Новобакаево
- Village
- Location within Bashkortostan Location within Russia
- Coordinates: 55°00′N 54°56′E
- Country: Russia
- Region: Bashkortostan
- District: Kushnarenkovsky District
- Time zone: UTC+5:00

Novobakayevo (Russian: Новобакаево; Bashkir: Яңы Баҡай, Yañı Baqay) is a rural locality (a village) in Bakayevsky Selsoviet, Kushnarenkovsky District, Bashkortostan, Russia. The population was 65 as of 2010. There are 2 streets.

== Geography ==
Novobakayevo is located 31 km southwest of Kushnarenkovo (the district's administrative centre) by road. Bakayevo is the nearest rural locality.
