= Staromusino, Chishminsky District, Republic of Bashkortostan =

Staromusino Старомусино
- Selo
- Location within Bashkortostan Location within Russia
- Coordinates: 54°23′N 55°30′E
- Country: Russia
- Region: Bashkortostan
- District: Chishminsky District
- Time zone: UTC+5:00

Staromusino (Russian: Старомусино; Bashkir: Иҫке Муса, İśke Musa) is a rural locality (a selo) in Chuvalkipovsky Selsoviet, Chishminsky District, Bashkortostan, Russia. The population was 578 as of 2010. There are 9 streets.

== Geography ==
Staromusino is located 35 km southeast of Chishmy (the district's administrative centre) by road. Abrayevo is the nearest rural locality.
