= Baytally =

Baytally Байталлы
- Selo
- Location within Bashkortostan Location within Russia
- Coordinates: 55°03′N 55°07′E
- Country: Russia
- Region: Bashkortostan
- District: Kushnarenkovsky District
- Time zone: UTC+5:00

Baytally (Russian: Байталлы; Bashkir: Байталлы, Baytallı) is a rural locality (a selo) and the administrative centre of Rasmekeyevsky Selsoviet, Kushnarenkovsky District, Bashkortostan, Russia. The population was 445 as of 2010. There are 10 streets.

== Geography ==
Baytally is located 16 km southwest of Kushnarenkovo (the district's administrative centre) by road. Rasmekeyevo is the nearest rural locality.
