= Zavodyanka =

Zavodyanka Заводянка
- Village
- Location within Bashkortostan Location within Russia
- Coordinates: 54°37′N 55°29′E
- Country: Russia
- Region: Bashkortostan
- District: Chishminsky District
- Time zone: UTC+5:00

Zavodyanka (Russian: Заводянка) is a rural locality (a village) in Alkinsky Selsoviet, Chishminsky District, Bashkortostan, Russia. The population was 91 as of 2010. There are 5 streets.

== Geography ==
Zavodyanka is located 10 km northeast of Chishmy (the district's administrative centre) by road. Sanzharovka is the nearest rural locality.
