= Nizhniye Termy =

Nizhniye Termy Нижние Термы
- Village
- Location within Bashkortostan Location within Russia
- Coordinates: 54°35′N 55°15′E
- Country: Russia
- Region: Bashkortostan
- District: Chishminsky District
- Time zone: UTC+5:00

Nizhniye Termy (Russian: Нижние Термы; Bashkir: Түбәнге Тирмә, Tübänge Tirmä) is a rural locality (a village) in Yeremeyevsky Selsoviet, Chishminsky District, Bashkortostan, Russia. The village has 5 streets and, as of 2010, a population of 331.

== Geography ==
Nizhniye Termy is located 10 km west of Chishmy, the administrative centre of the district. Verkhniye Termy is the nearest rural locality.

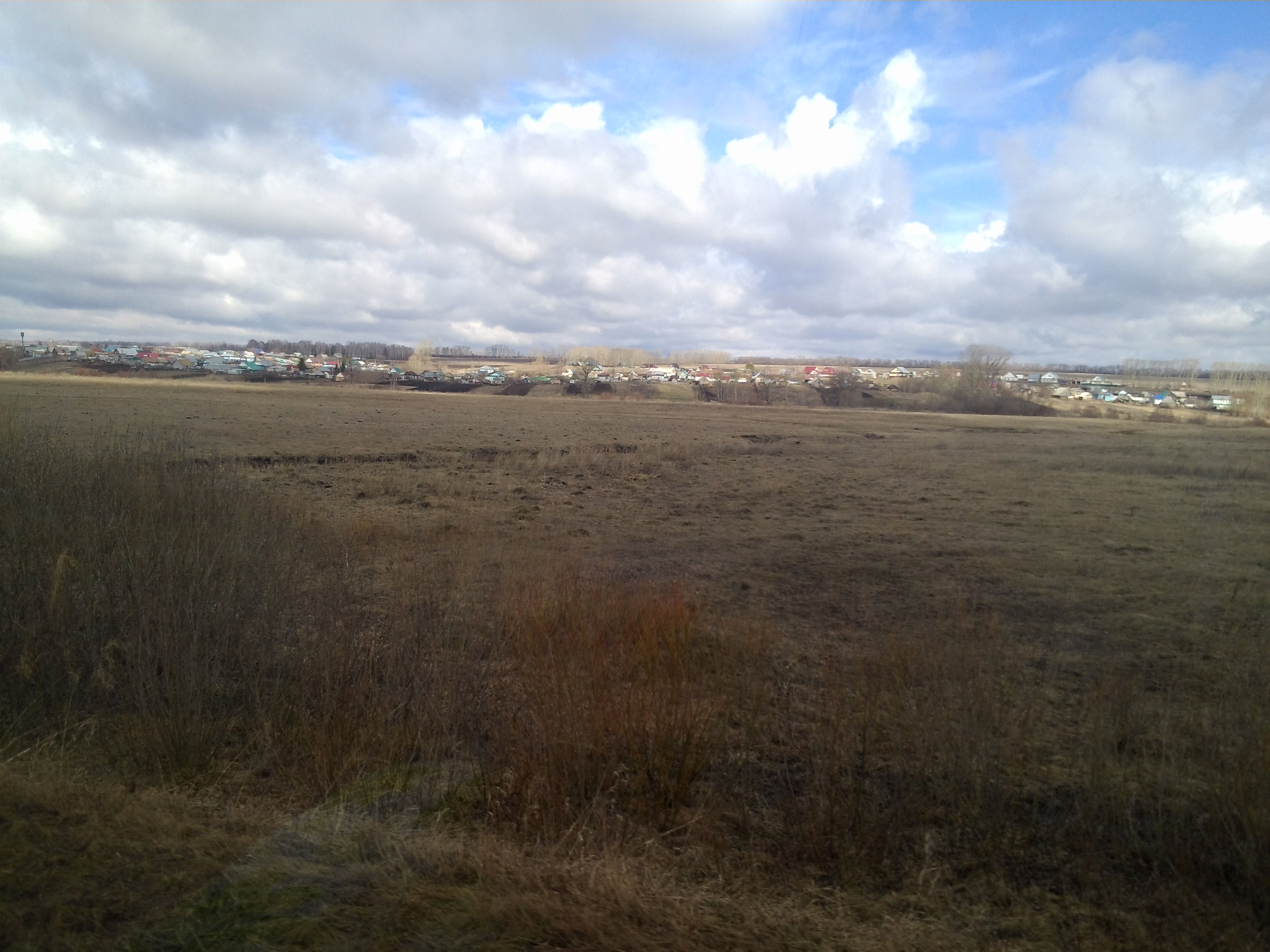
