= Penza, Chishminsky District, Republic of Bashkortostan =

Penza Пенза
- Village
- Location within Bashkortostan Location within Russia
- Coordinates: 54°26′N 55°19′E
- Country: Russia
- Region: Bashkortostan
- District: Chishminsky District
- Time zone: UTC+5:00

Penza (Russian: Пенза; Bashkir: Пөнза, Pönza) is a rural locality (a village) in Durasovsky Selsoviet, Chishminsky District, Bashkortostan, Russia. The population was 133 as of 2010. There is 1 street.

== Geography ==
Penza is 25 km southwest of Chishmy, the district's administrative centre. Bikkulovo is the nearest rural locality.
