= Yengalyshevo =

Yengalyshevo Енгалышево
- Selo
- Location within Bashkortostan Location within Russia
- Coordinates: 54°30′N 55°46′E
- Country: Russia
- Region: Bashkortostan
- District: Chishminsky District
- Time zone: UTC+5:00

Yengalyshevo (Russian: Енгалышево; Bashkir: Енғалыш, Yenğalış) is a rural locality (a selo) and the administrative centre of Yengalyshevsky Selsoviet, Chishminsky District, Bashkortostan, Russia. The population was 485 as of 2010. There are 26 streets.

== Geography ==
Yengalyshevo is located 38 km southeast of Chishmy (the district's administrative centre) by road. Fomichevo is the nearest rural locality.
