= Starobaskakovo =

Starobaskakovo Старобаскаково
- Village
- Location within Bashkortostan Location within Russia
- Coordinates: 55°08′N 55°18′E
- Country: Russia
- Region: Bashkortostan
- District: Kushnarenkovsky District
- Time zone: UTC+5:00

Starobaskakovo (Russian: Старобаскаково; Bashkir: Иҫке Баҫҡаҡ, İśke Baśqaq) is a rural locality (a village) in Matveyevsky Selsoviet, Kushnarenkovsky District, Bashkortostan, Russia. The population was 301 as of 2010. There are 8 streets.

== Geography ==
Starobaskakovo is located 8 km northwest of Kushnarenkovo (the district's administrative centre) by road. Kushnarenkovo is the nearest rural locality.
