= Novouptino =

Novouptino Новоуптино
- Selo
- Location within Bashkortostan Location within Russia
- Coordinates: 54°28′N 55°27′E
- Country: Russia
- Region: Bashkortostan
- District: Chishminsky District
- Time zone: UTC+5:00

Novouptino (Russian: Новоуптино; Bashkir: Яңы Опто, Yañı Opto) is a rural locality (a selo) in Novotroitsky Selsoviet, Chishminsky District, Bashkortostan, Russia. The population was 33 as of 2010. There is 1 street.

== Geography ==
Novouptino lies 21 km south of Chishmy, the district's administrative centre. Alexandrovka is the nearest rural locality.
