= Kyzylkuper =

Kyzylkuper Кызылкупер
- Village
- Location within Bashkortostan Location within Russia
- Coordinates: 55°14′N 54°59′E
- Country: Russia
- Region: Bashkortostan
- District: Kushnarenkovsky District
- Time zone: UTC+5:00

Kyzylkuper (Russian: Кызылкупер; Bashkir: Ҡыҙылкүпер, Qıźılküper) is a rural locality (a village) in Gorkovsky Selsoviet, Kushnarenkovsky District, Bashkortostan, Russia. The population was 82 as of 2010. There is 1 streets.

== Geography ==
Kyzylkuper is located 36 km northwest of Kushnarenkovo (the district's administrative centre) by road. Ilikovo is the nearest rural locality.
