= Petropavlovo =

Petropavlovo Петропавлово
- Selo
- Location within Bashkortostan Location within Russia
- Coordinates: 55°00′N 55°40′E
- Country: Russia
- Region: Bashkortostan
- District: Kushnarenkovsky District
- Time zone: UTC+5:00

Petropavlovo (Russian: Петропавлово) is a rural locality (a selo) in Starokamyshlinsky Selsoviet, Kushnarenkovsky District, Bashkortostan, Russia. The population was 43 as of 2010. There are 4 streets.

== Geography ==
Petropavlovo is located 41 km southeast of Kushnarenkovo (the district's administrative centre) by road. Pervushino is the nearest rural locality.
