= Lentovka =

Lentovka Лентовка
- Village
- Location within Bashkortostan Location within Russia
- Coordinates: 54°29′N 55°43′E
- Country: Russia
- Region: Bashkortostan
- District: Chishminsky District
- Time zone: UTC+5:00

Lentovka (Russian: Лентовка) is a rural locality (a village) in Yengalyshevsky Selsoviet, Chishminsky District, Bashkortostan, Russia. The population was 21 as of 2010. There is 1 street.

== Geography ==
Lentovka is located 42 km southeast of Chishmy, the administrative centre of the district. Yengalyshevo is the nearest rural locality.
