= Rasmekeyevo =

Rasmekeyevo Расмекеево
- Village
- Location within Bashkortostan Location within Russia
- Coordinates: 55°04′N 55°05′E
- Country: Russia
- Region: Bashkortostan
- District: Kushnarenkovsky District
- Time zone: UTC+5:00

Rasmekeyevo (Russian: Расмекеево; Bashkir: Рәсмәкәй, Räsmäkäy) is a rural locality (a village) in Rasmekeyevsky Selsoviet, Kushnarenkovsky District, Bashkortostan, Russia. The population was 224 as of 2010. There are 3 streets.

== Geography ==
Rasmekeyevo is located 21 km southwest of Kushnarenkovo (the district's administrative centre) by road. Kupayevo is the nearest rural locality.
