= Safarovo, Chishminsky District, Republic of Bashkortostan =

Safarovo Сафарово
- Selo
- Location within Bashkortostan Location within Russia
- Coordinates: 54°33′N 55°13′E
- Country: Russia
- Region: Bashkortostan
- District: Chishminsky District
- Time zone: UTC+5:00

Safarovo (Russian: Сафарово; Bashkir: Сафар, Safar) is a rural locality (a selo) and the administrative center of Safarovsky Selsoviet, Chishminsky District, Bashkortostan, Russia. The population was 991 as of 2010. There are 19 streets.

== Geography ==
Safarovo is located 14 km southwest of Chishmy, the district's administrative centre. Karamaly is the nearest rural locality.
