= Babikovo =

Babikovo Бабиково
- Village
- Location within Bashkortostan Location within Russia
- Coordinates: 54°30′N 55°28′E
- Country: Russia
- Region: Bashkortostan
- District: Chishminsky District
- Time zone: UTC+5:00

Babikovo (Russian: Бабиково; Bashkir: Бабик, Babik) is a rural locality (a village) in Kara-Yakupovsky Selsoviet, Chishminsky District, Bashkortostan, Russia. The population was 153 as of 2010. There are 2 streets.

== Geography ==
Babikovo is located 17 km southeast of Chishmy, the district's administrative centre. Kara-Yakupovo is the nearest rural locality.
