= Bikeyevo =

Bikeyevo Бикеево
- Selo
- Location within Bashkortostan Location within Russia
- Coordinates: 54°23′N 55°34′E
- Country: Russia
- Region: Bashkortostan
- District: Chishminsky District
- Time zone: UTC+5:00

Bikeyevo (Russian: Бикеево; Bashkir: Бикәй, Bikäy) is a rural locality (a selo) in Ibragimovsky Selsoviet, Chishminsky District, Bashkortostan, Russia. The population was 494 as of 2010. There are 9 streets.

== Geography ==
Bikeyevo is located 32 km southeast of Chishmy, the administrative centre of Chishminsky district. Ibragimovo is the nearest rural locality.
