= Sredneusmanovo =

Sredneusmanovo Среднеусманово
- Village
- Location within Bashkortostan Location within Russia
- Coordinates: 54°25′N 55°08′E
- Country: Russia
- Region: Bashkortostan
- District: Chishminsky District
- Time zone: UTC+5:00

Sredneusmanovo (Russian: Среднеусманово; Bashkir: Иҫке Уҫман, İśke Uśman) is a rural locality (a village) in Shingak-Kulsky Selsoviet, Chishminsky District, Bashkortostan, Russia. The population was 139 as of 2010. There is 1 street.

== Geography ==
Sredneusmanovo is located 27 km southwest of Chishmy (the district's administrative centre) by road. Pasyakovka is the nearest rural locality.
