= Bulyakbashevo =

Bulyakbashevo Булякбашево
- Village
- Location within Bashkortostan Location within Russia
- Coordinates: 54°22′N 55°21′E
- Country: Russia
- Region: Bashkortostan
- District: Chishminsky District
- Time zone: UTC+5:00

Bulyakbashevo (Russian: Булякбашево; Bashkir: Бүләкбаш, Büläkbaş) is a rural locality (a village) in Durasovsky Selsoviet, Chishminsky District, Bashkortostan, Russia. The population was 161 as of 2010. The village has 4 streets.

== Geography ==
Bulyakbashevo is located 31 km south of Chishmy, the district's administrative centre. Chuvalkipovo is the nearest rural locality.
