= Alkino-2 =

Alkino-2 Алкино-2
- Selo
- Location within Bashkortostan Location within Russia
- Coordinates: 54°39′N 55°35′E
- Country: Russia
- Region: Bashkortostan
- District: Chishminsky District
- Time zone: UTC+5:00

Alkino-2 (Russian: Алкино-2; Bashkir: 2-се Алкин, 2-se Alkin) is a rural locality (a selo) in Chishminsky District, Bashkortostan, Russia. The village has 15 streets and, as of 2010, a population of 4,996.

== Geography ==
Alkino-2 is located 24 km northeast of Chishmy, the district's administrative centre. Alkino is the nearest rural locality.
