= Udryak =

Udryak Удряк
- Village
- Location within Bashkortostan Location within Russia
- Coordinates: 54°29′N 55°11′E
- Country: Russia
- Region: Bashkortostan
- District: Chishminsky District
- Time zone: UTC+5:00

Udryak (Russian: Удряк; Bashkir: Өйҙөрәк, Öyźöräk) is a rural locality (a village) in Safarovsky Selsoviet, Chishminsky District, Bashkortostan, Russia. The population was 431 as of 2010. There are five streets.

== Geography ==
Udryak is located 20 km southwest of Chishmy (the district's administrative centre) by road. Kushkuak is the nearest rural locality.
