= Albeyevo =

Albeyevo Альбеево
- Village
- Location within Bashkortostan Location within Russia
- Coordinates: 54°20′N 55°17′E
- Country: Russia
- Region: Bashkortostan
- District: Chishminsky District
- Time zone: UTC+5:00

Albeyevo (Russian: Альбеево; Bashkir: Әлбәй, Älbäy) is a rural locality (a village) in Durasovsky Selsoviet, Chishminsky District, Bashkortostan, Russia. The village has 4 streets and, as of 2010, a population of 198.

== Geography ==
Albeyevo is located 34 km south of Chishmy, the district's administrative centre. Chukrakly is the nearest rural locality.
