= Syultyup =

Syultyup Сюльтюп
- Village
- Location within Bashkortostan Location within Russia
- Coordinates: 54°58′N 55°09′E
- Country: Russia
- Region: Bashkortostan
- District: Kushnarenkovsky District
- Time zone: UTC+5:00

Syultyup (Russian: Сюльтюп; Bashkir: Сүлтөп, Sültöp) is a rural locality (a village) in Starokurmashevsky Selsoviet, Kushnarenkovsky District, Bashkortostan, Russia. The population was 153 as of 2010. There are 2 streets.

== Geography ==
Syultyup is located 22 km southwest of Kushnarenkovo (the district's administrative centre) by road. Karatyaki is the nearest rural locality.
