= Kaltayevo, Kushnarenkovsky District, Republic of Bashkortostan =

Kaltayevo Калтаево
- Selo
- Location within Bashkortostan Location within Russia
- Coordinates: 55°00′N 55°24′E
- Country: Russia
- Region: Bashkortostan
- District: Kushnarenkovsky District
- Time zone: UTC+5:00

Kaltayevo (Russian: Калтаево; Bashkir: Ҡалтай, Qaltay) is a rural locality (a selo) in Sharipovsky Selsoviet, Kushnarenkovsky District, Bashkortostan, Russia. The population was 576 as of 2010. There are 14 streets.

== Geography ==
Kaltayevo is located 22 km south of Kushnarenkovo (the district's administrative centre) by road. Gurgureyevo is the nearest rural locality.
