= Yakupovo, Kushnarenkovsky District, Republic of Bashkortostan =

Yakupovo Якупово
- Village
- Location within Bashkortostan Location within Russia
- Coordinates: 55°06′N 55°12′E
- Country: Russia
- Region: Bashkortostan
- District: Kushnarenkovsky District
- Time zone: UTC+5:00

Yakupovo (Russian: Якупово; Bashkir: Яҡуп, Yaqup) is a rural locality (a village) in Matveyevsky Selsoviet, Kushnarenkovsky District, Bashkortostan, Russia. The population was 130 as of 2010. There are 3 streets.

== Geography ==
Yakupovo is located 14 km northwest of Kushnarenkovo (the district's administrative centre) by road. Matveyevo is the nearest rural locality.
