= Nizhnekhozyatovo =

Nizhnekhozyatovo Нижнехозятово
- Village
- Location within Bashkortostan Location within Russia
- Coordinates: 54°29′N 55°18′E
- Country: Russia
- Region: Bashkortostan
- District: Chishminsky District
- Time zone: UTC+5:00

Nizhnekhozyatovo (Russian: Нижнехозятово; Bashkir: Түбәнге Хәжәт, Tübänge Xäjät) is a rural locality (a village) in Chishminsky Selsoviet, Chishminsky District, Bashkortostan, Russia. The population was 246 as of 2010. There are 4 streets.

== Geography ==
Nizhnekhozyatovo is 15 km southwest of Chishmy, the district's administrative centre. Srednekhozyatovo is the nearest rural locality.
