= Selo sanatoriya Alkino =

Selo sanatoriya Alkino Село санатория «Алкино»
- Selo
- Location within Bashkortostan Location within Russia
- Coordinates: 54°37′N 55°34′E
- Country: Russia
- Region: Bashkortostan
- District: Chishminsky District
- Time zone: UTC+5:00

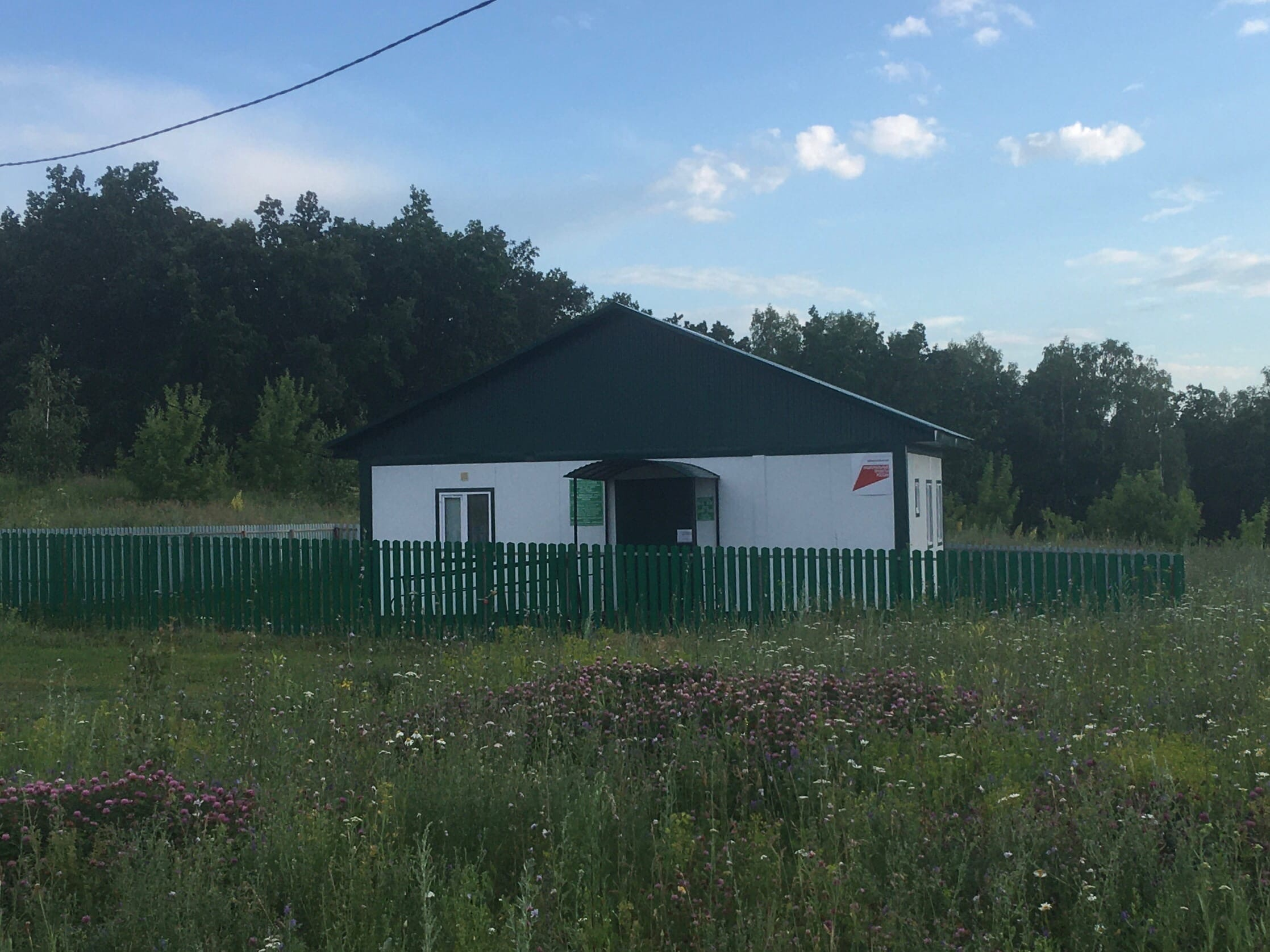
Outpatient Clinic in the Village of the "Alkino" Sanatorium

Selo sanatoriya Alkino (Russian: Село санатория «Алкино»; Bashkir: «Әлкә» шифаханаһы, «Älkä» şifaxanahı) is a rural locality (a selo) in Alkinsky Selsoviet, Chishminsky District, Bashkortostan, Russia. The population was 432 as of 2010. There are 34 streets.

== Geography ==
Selo sanatoriya Alkino is located 27 km northeast of Chishmy (the district's administrative centre). Novomikhaylovka is the nearest rural locality.
