= Bogolyubovka, Chishminsky District, Republic of Bashkortostan =

Bogolyubovka Боголюбовка
- Village
- Location within Bashkortostan Location within Russia
- Coordinates: 54°31′N 55°37′E
- Country: Russia
- Region: Bashkortostan
- District: Chishminsky District
- Time zone: UTC+5:00

Bogolyubovka (Russian: Боголюбовка) is a rural locality (a village) in Arovsky Selsoviet, Chishminsky District, Bashkortostan, Russia. The population was 36 as of 2010. There are 11 streets.

== Geography ==
Bogolyubovka is located 28 km southeast of Chishmy, the district's administrative centre. Klyashevo is the nearest rural locality.
