= Akhlystino, Kushnarenkovsky District, Republic of Bashkortostan =

Akhlystino Ахлыстино
- Selo
- Location within Bashkortostan Location within Russia
- Coordinates: 55°09′N 55°40′E
- Country: Russia
- Region: Bashkortostan
- District: Kushnarenkovsky District
- Time zone: UTC+5:00

Akhlystino (Russian: Ахлыстино) is a rural locality (a selo) in Akhmetovsky Selsoviet, Kushnarenkovsky District, Bashkortostan, Russia. The population was 183 as of 2010. There are 9 streets.

== Geography ==
Akhlystino is located 30 km northeast of Kushnarenkovo (the district's administrative centre) by road. Kerenyovo is the nearest rural locality.
