= Ibragimovo, Kushnarenkovsky District, Republic of Bashkortostan =

Ibragimovo Ибрагимово
- Village
- Location within Bashkortostan Location within Russia
- Coordinates: 55°01′N 55°11′E
- Country: Russia
- Region: Bashkortostan
- District: Kushnarenkovsky District
- Time zone: UTC+5:00

Ibragimovo (Russian: Ибрагимово; Bashkir: Ибраһим, İbrahim) is a rural locality (a village) in Starokurmashevsky Selsoviet, Kushnarenkovsky District, Bashkortostan, Russia. The population was 128 as of 2010. There are 2 streets.

== Geography ==
Ibragimovo is located 18 km southwest of Kushnarenkovo (the district's administrative centre) by road. Novokurmashevo is the nearest rural locality.
