= Sharapovka =

Sharapovka Шапаровка
- Village
- Location within Bashkortostan Location within Russia
- Coordinates: 54°36′N 55°28′E
- Country: Russia
- Region: Bashkortostan
- District: Chishminsky District
- Time zone: UTC+5:00

Sharapovka (Russian: Шапаровка) is a rural locality (a village) in Alkinsky Selsoviet, Chishminsky District, Bashkortostan, Russia. The population was 26 as of 2010. There are 2 streets.

== Geography ==
Sharapovka is located 8 km northeast of Chishmy (the district's administrative centre) by road. Bogomolovka is the nearest rural locality.
