= Pervomaysky, Chishminsky District, Republic of Bashkortostan =

Pervomaysky Первомайский
- Village
- Location within Bashkortostan Location within Russia
- Coordinates: 54°23′N 55°39′E
- Country: Russia
- Region: Bashkortostan
- District: Chishminsky District
- Time zone: UTC+5:00

Pervomaysky (Russian: Первомайский) is a rural locality (a village) in Ibragimovsky Selsoviet, Chishminsky District, Bashkortostan, Russia. The population was 374 as of 2010. There are 4 streets.

== Geography ==
Pervomaysky is located 37 km southeast of Chishmy, the administrative seat of the district. Repyevka is the nearest rural locality.
