= Ilikovo =

Ilikovo Иликово
- Selo
- Location within Bashkortostan Location within Russia
- Coordinates: 55°13′N 54°57′E
- Country: Russia
- Region: Bashkortostan
- District: Kushnarenkovsky District
- Time zone: UTC+5:00

Ilikovo (Russian: Иликово; Bashkir: Илек, İlek) is a rural locality (a selo) and the administrative centre of Gorkovsky Selsoviet, Kushnarenkovsky District, Bashkortostan, Russia. The population was 541 as of 2010. There are 5 streets.

== Geography ==
Ilikovo is located 34 km northwest of Kushnarenkovo (the district's administrative centre) by road. Kyzylkuper is the nearest rural locality.
