= Matveyevo =

Matveyevo Матвеево
- Selo
- Location within Bashkortostan Location within Russia
- Coordinates: 55°08′N 55°14′E
- Country: Russia
- Region: Bashkortostan
- District: Kushnarenkovsky District
- Time zone: UTC+5:00

Matveyevo (Russian: Матвеево) is a rural locality (a selo) in Matveyevsky Selsoviet, Kushnarenkovsky District, Bashkortostan, Russia. The population was 106 as of 2010. There are 3 streets.

== Geography ==
Matveyevo is located 10 km northwest of Kushnarenkovo (the district's administrative centre) by road. Yakupovo is the nearest rural locality.
