= Aminevo, Chishminsky District, Republic of Bashkortostan =

Aminevo Аминево
- Selo
- Location within Bashkortostan Location within Russia
- Coordinates: 54°42′N 55°17′E
- Country: Russia
- Region: Bashkortostan
- District: Chishminsky District
- Time zone: UTC+5:00

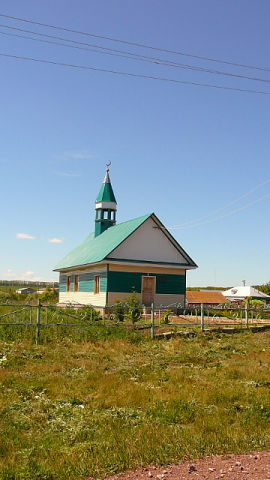
A mosque in Aminevo (2012).

Aminevo (Russian: Аминево; Bashkir: Әмин, Ämin) is a rural locality (a selo) in Arslanovsky Selsoviet, Chishminsky District, Bashkortostan, Russia. The population was 442 as of 2010. There are 5 streets.

== Geography ==
Aminevo is located 22 km northwest of Chishmy, the administrative centre of Chishminsky district. Novaya is the nearest rural locality.
