= Starokurmashevo =

Starokurmashevo Старокурмашево
- Selo
- Location within Bashkortostan Location within Russia
- Coordinates: 55°05′N 55°16′E
- Country: Russia
- Region: Bashkortostan
- District: Kushnarenkovsky District
- Time zone: UTC+5:00

Starokurmashevo (Russian: Старокурмашево; Bashkir: Иҫке Ҡормаш, İśke Qormaş) is a rural locality (a selo) and the administrative centre of Starokurmashevsky Selsoviet, Kushnarenkovsky District, Bashkortostan, Russia. The population was 646 as of 2010. There are 9 streets.

== Geography ==
Starokurmashevo is located 5 km southwest of Kushnarenkovo (the district's administrative centre) by road. Kushnarenkovo is the nearest rural locality.
