= Nizhnesaitovo =

Nizhnesaitovo Нижнесаитово
- Village
- Location within Bashkortostan Location within Russia
- Coordinates: 54°59′N 55°01′E
- Country: Russia
- Region: Bashkortostan
- District: Kushnarenkovsky District
- Time zone: UTC+5:00

Nizhnesaitovo (Russian: Нижнесаитово; Bashkir: Түбәнге Сәйет, Tübänge Säyet) is a rural locality (a village) in Bakayevsky Selsoviet, Kushnarenkovsky District, Bashkortostan, Russia. The population was 106 as of 2010. There are 2 streets.

== Geography ==
Nizhnesaitovo is located 27 km southwest of Kushnarenkovo (the district's administrative centre) by road. Bakayevo is the nearest rural locality.
