= Staraya Murtaza =

Staraya Murtaza Старая Муртаза
- Village
- Location within Bashkortostan Location within Russia
- Coordinates: 55°11′N 55°00′E
- Country: Russia
- Region: Bashkortostan
- District: Kushnarenkovsky District
- Time zone: UTC+5:00

Staraya Murtaza (Russian: Старая Муртаза; Bashkir: Иҫке Мортаза, İśke Mortaza) is a rural locality (a village) in Karacha-Yelginsky Selsoviet, Kushnarenkovsky District, Bashkortostan, Russia. The population was 133 as of 2010. There are 2 streets.

== Geography ==
Staraya Murtaza is located 30 km northwest of Kushnarenkovo (the district's administrative centre) by road. Tolbazy is the nearest rural locality.
