= Subay, Republic of Bashkortostan =

Subay Субай
- Village
- Location within Bashkortostan Location within Russia
- Coordinates: 54°59′N 55°29′E
- Country: Russia
- Region: Bashkortostan
- District: Kushnarenkovsky District
- Time zone: UTC+5:00

Subay (Bashkir and Russian: Субай) is a rural locality (a village) in Sharipovsky Selsoviet, Kushnarenkovsky District, Bashkortostan, Russia. The population was 44 as of 2010. There are 2 streets.

== Geography ==
Subay is located 19 km southeast of Kushnarenkovo (the district's administrative centre) by road. Nizhneakbashevo is the nearest rural locality.
