= Starogumerovo =

Starogumerovo Старогумерово
- Selo
- Location within Bashkortostan Location within Russia
- Coordinates: 54°49′N 55°18′E
- Country: Russia
- Region: Bashkortostan
- District: Kushnarenkovsky District
- Time zone: UTC+5:00

Starogumerovo (Russian: Старогумерово; Bashkir: Иҫке Ғүмәр, İśke Ğümär) is a rural locality (a selo) and the administrative centre of Starogumerovsky Selsoviet, Kushnarenkovsky District, Bashkortostan, Russia. The population was 581 as of 2010. There are 8 streets.

== Geography ==
Starogumerovo is located 35 km south of Kushnarenkovo (the district's administrative centre) by road. Novoakbashevo is the nearest rural locality.
