= Yabalakly =

Yabalakly Ябалаклы
- Selo
- Location within Bashkortostan Location within Russia
- Coordinates: 54°23′N 55°16′E
- Country: Russia
- Region: Bashkortostan
- District: Chishminsky District
- Time zone: UTC+5:00

Yabalakly (Russian: Ябалаклы; Bashkir: Ябалаҡлы, Yabalaqlı) is a rural locality (a selo) in Shingak-Kulsky Selsoviet, Chishminsky District, Bashkortostan, Russia. The population was 277 as of 2010. There are 4 streets.

== Geography ==
Yabalakly is located 29 km south of Chishmy (the district's administrative centre) by road. Novye Yabalakly is the nearest rural locality.
