= Mavlyutovo =

Mavlyutovo Мавлютово
- Village
- Location within Bashkortostan Location within Russia
- Coordinates: 55°02′N 55°02′E
- Country: Russia
- Region: Bashkortostan
- District: Kushnarenkovsky District
- Time zone: UTC+5:00

Mavlyutovo (Russian: Мавлютово; Bashkir: Мәүлет, Mäwlet) is a rural locality (a village) in Bakayevsky Selsoviet, Kushnarenkovsky District, Bashkortostan, Russia. Its population was 38 as of 2010. There is 1 streets.

== Geography ==
Mavlyutovo is located 22 km southwest of Kushnarenkovo (the district's administrative centre) by road. Bakayevo is the nearest rural locality.
