= Bakayevo, Kushnarenkovsky District, Republic of Bashkortostan =

Bakayevo Бакаево
- Selo
- Location within Bashkortostan Location within Russia
- Coordinates: 55°01′N 55°02′E
- Country: Russia
- Region: Bashkortostan
- District: Kushnarenkovsky District
- Time zone: UTC+5:00

Bakayevo (Russian: Бакаево; Bashkir: Баҡай, Baqay) is a rural locality (a selo) and the administrative centre of Bakayevsky Selsoviet, Kushnarenkovsky District, Bashkortostan, Russia. The population was 446 as of 2010. There are 8 streets.

== Geography ==
Bakayevo is located 24 km southwest of Kushnarenkovo (the district's administrative centre) by road. Mavlyutovo is the nearest rural locality.
