= Novoabdullino =

Novoabdullino Новоабдуллино
- Village
- Location within Bashkortostan Location within Russia
- Coordinates: 54°35′N 55°30′E
- Country: Russia
- Region: Bashkortostan
- District: Chishminsky District
- Time zone: UTC+5:00

Novoabdullino (Russian: Новоабдуллино; Bashkir: Яңы Абдулла, Yañı Abdulla) is a rural locality (a village) in Kara-Yakupovsky Selsoviet, Chishminsky District, Bashkortostan, Russia. The population was 108 as of 2010. There are 2 streets.

== Geography ==
Novoabdullino lies 14 km east of Chishmy, the district's administrative centre. Kara-Yakupovo is the nearest rural locality.
