= Novy Berkadak =

Novy Berkadak Новый Беркадак
- Village
- Location within Bashkortostan Location within Russia
- Coordinates: 54°36′N 55°32′E
- Country: Russia
- Region: Bashkortostan
- District: Chishminsky District
- Time zone: UTC+5:00

Novy Berkadak (Russian: Новый Беркадак; Bashkir: Яңы Берҡаҙаҡ, Yañı Berqaźaq) is a rural locality (a village) in Arovsky Selsoviet, Chishminsky District, Bashkortostan, Russia. The population was 4 as of 2010. There are 3 streets.

== Geography ==
Novy Berkadak is 27 km east of Chishmy, the district's administrative centre, by road. Chernigovka is the nearest rural locality.
