= Novyye Tukmakly =

Novyye Tukmakly Новые Тукмаклы
- Selo
- Location within Bashkortostan Location within Russia
- Coordinates: 55°00′N 55°17′E
- Country: Russia
- Region: Bashkortostan
- District: Kushnarenkovsky District
- Time zone: UTC+5:00

Novyye Tukmakly (Russian: Новые Тукмаклы; Bashkir: Яңы Туҡмаҡлы, Yañı Tuqmaqlı) is a rural locality (a selo) in Starotukmaklinsky Selsoviet, Kushnarenkovsky District, Bashkortostan, Russia. The population was 197 as of 2010. There are 10 streets.

== Geography ==
Novyye Tukmakly is located 13 km southwest of Kushnarenkovo (the district's administrative centre) by road. Akhta is the nearest rural locality.
