= Staryye Tukmakly =

Staryye Tukmakly Старые Тукмаклы
- Selo
- Location within Bashkortostan Location within Russia
- Coordinates: 54°56′N 55°15′E
- Country: Russia
- Region: Bashkortostan
- District: Kushnarenkovsky District

Population
  - Estimate (2020): 640
- Time zone: UTC+5:00

Staryye Tukmakly (Russian: Старые Тукмаклы; Bashkir: Иҫке Туҡмаҡлы, İśke Tuqmaqlı) is a rural locality (a selo) and the administrative centre of Starotukmaklinsky Selsoviet, Kushnarenkovsky District, Bashkortostan, Russia. The population was 728 as of 2010. There are 7 streets.

== Geography ==
Staryye Tukmakly is located 22 km southwest of Kushnarenkovo (the district's administrative centre) by road. Uguzevo is the nearest rural locality.
