= Taganayevo =

Taganayevo Таганаево
- Village
- Location within Bashkortostan Location within Russia
- Coordinates: 54°59′N 55°48′E
- Country: Russia
- Region: Bashkortostan
- District: Kushnarenkovsky District
- Time zone: UTC+5:00

Taganayevo (Russian: Таганаево; Bashkir: Тағанаев, Tağanayew) is a rural locality (a village) in Starokamyshlinsky Selsoviet, Kushnarenkovsky District, Bashkortostan, Russia. The population was 9 as of 2010. There are 3 streets.

== Geography ==
Taganayevo is located 44 km southeast of Kushnarenkovo (the district's administrative centre) by road. Novye Kamyshly is the nearest rural locality.
