= Kudushlibashevo =

Kudushlibashevo Кудушлибашево
- Village
- Location within Bashkortostan Location within Russia
- Coordinates: 55°04′N 55°15′E
- Country: Russia
- Region: Bashkortostan
- District: Kushnarenkovsky District
- Time zone: UTC+5:00

Kudushlibashevo (Russian: Кудушлибашево; Bashkir: Көҙөшлөбаш, Köźöşlöbaş) is a rural locality (a village) in Starokurmashevsky Selsoviet, Kushnarenkovsky District, Bashkortostan, Russia. The population was 56 as of 2010. There is 1 street.

== Geography ==
Kudushlibashevo is located 9 km southwest of Kushnarenkovo (the district's administrative centre) by road. Starokurmashevo is the nearest rural locality.
