= Novogumerovo =

Novogumerovo Новогумерово
- Village
- Location within Bashkortostan Location within Russia
- Coordinates: 54°53′N 55°17′E
- Country: Russia
- Region: Bashkortostan
- District: Kushnarenkovsky District
- Time zone: UTC+5:00

Novogumerovo (Russian: Новогумерово; Bashkir: Яңы Ғүмәр, Yañı Ğümär) is a rural locality (a village) in Starogumerovsky Selsoviet, Kushnarenkovsky District, Bashkortostan, Russia. The population was 121 as of 2010. There is 1 street.

== Geography ==
Novogumerovo is located 29 km southwest of Kushnarenkovo (the district's administrative centre) by road. Novoakbashevo is the nearest rural locality.
