= Bilyazy =

Bilyazy Бильязы
- Village
- Location within Bashkortostan Location within Russia
- Coordinates: 54°26′N 55°37′E
- Country: Russia
- Region: Bashkortostan
- District: Chishminsky District
- Time zone: UTC+5:00

Bilyazy (Russian: Бильязы; Bashkir: Бильяҙы, Bilyaźı) is a rural locality (a village) in Novotroitsky Selsoviet, Chishminsky District, Bashkortostan, Russia. The population was 13 as of 2010. There is 1 street.

== Geography ==
Bilyazy is located 35 km southeast of Chishmy, the administrative centre of the district. Lomonosovo is the nearest rural locality.
