= Sultanayevo, Kushnarenkovsky District, Republic of Bashkortostan =

Sultanayevo Султанаево
- Selo
- Location within Bashkortostan Location within Russia
- Coordinates: 54°50′N 55°27′E
- Country: Russia
- Region: Bashkortostan
- District: Kushnarenkovsky District
- Time zone: UTC+5:00

Sultanayevo (Russian: Султанаево; Bashkir: Солтанай, Soltanay) is a rural locality (a selo) in Starogumerovsky Selsoviet, Kushnarenkovsky District, Bashkortostan, Russia. The population was 463 as of 2010. There are 13 streets.

== Geography ==
Sultanayevo is located 41 km south of Kushnarenkovo (the district's administrative centre) by road. Shemyak is the nearest rural locality.
