= Urazbakhty, Chishminsky District, Republic of Bashkortostan =

Urazbakhty Уразбахты
- Selo
- Location within Bashkortostan Location within Russia
- Coordinates: 54°41′N 55°28′E
- Country: Russia
- Region: Bashkortostan
- District: Chishminsky District
- Time zone: UTC+5:00

Urazbakhty (Russian: Уразбахты; Bashkir: Ураҙбахты, Uraźbaxtı) is a rural locality (a selo) in Alkinsky Selsoviet, Chishminsky District, Bashkortostan, Russia. The population was 457 as of 2010. There are 13 streets.

== Geography ==
Urazbakhty is located 20 km northeast of Chishmy (the district's administrative centre) by road. Salikhovo is the nearest rural locality.
