= Kara-Yakupovo =

Kara-Yakupovo Кара-Якупово
- Selo
- Location within Bashkortostan Location within Russia
- Coordinates: 54°33′N 55°28′E
- Country: Russia
- Region: Bashkortostan
- District: Chishminsky District
- Time zone: UTC+5:00

Kara-Yakupovo (Russian: Кара-Якупово; Bashkir: Ҡара Яҡуп, Qara Yaqup) is a rural locality (a selo) and the administrative centre of Kara-Yakupovsky Selsoviet, Chishminsky District, Bashkortostan, Russia. The village has 6 streets and, as of 2010, a population of 513.

== Geography ==
Kara-Yakupovo is located 11 km southeast of Chishmy (the district's administrative centre) by road. Gorny is the nearest rural locality.
