= Voyetskoye =

Voyetskoye Воецкое
- Selo
- Location within Bashkortostan Location within Russia
- Coordinates: 54°57′N 55°29′E
- Country: Russia
- Region: Bashkortostan
- District: Kushnarenkovsky District
- Time zone: UTC+5:00

Voyetskoye (Russian: Воецкое) is a rural locality (a selo) in Sharipovsky Selsoviet, Kushnarenkovsky District, Bashkortostan, Russia. The population was 74 as of 2010. There are 2 streets.

== Geography ==
Voyetskoye is located 27 km southeast of Kushnarenkovo (the district's administrative centre) by road. Verkhneakbashevo is the nearest rural locality.
