= Kuchumovo =

Kuchumovo Кучумово
- Village
- Location within Bashkortostan Location within Russia
- Coordinates: 54°30′N 55°23′E
- Country: Russia
- Region: Bashkortostan
- District: Chishminsky District
- Time zone: UTC+5:00

Kuchumovo (Russian: Кучумово; Bashkir: Күсем, Küsem) is a rural locality (a village) in Chishminsky Selsoviet, Chishminsky District, Bashkortostan, Russia. The village has 5 streets and, as of 2010, a population of 116.

== Geography ==
Kuchumovo is 16 km south of Chishmy, the district's administrative centre. Isakovka is the nearest rural locality.
