= Bogomolovka =

Bogomolovka Богомоловка
- Village
- Location within Bashkortostan Location within Russia
- Coordinates: 54°37′N 55°28′E
- Country: Russia
- Region: Bashkortostan
- District: Chishminsky District
- Time zone: UTC+5:00

Bogomolovka (Russian: Богомоловка) is a rural locality (a village) in Alkinsky Selsoviet, Chishminsky District, Bashkortostan, Russia. The population was 94 as of 2010. There are 7 streets in the village.

== Geography ==
Bogomolovka is located 8 km northeast of Chishmy, the district's administrative centre. Shaparovka is the nearest rural locality.
