= Kazarma, Kushnarenkovsky District, Republic of Bashkortostan =

Kazarma Казарма
- Selo
- Location within Bashkortostan Location within Russia
- Coordinates: 54°56′N 55°22′E
- Country: Russia
- Region: Bashkortostan
- District: Kushnarenkovsky District
- Time zone: UTC+5:00

Kazarma (Russian: Казарма; Bashkir: Ҡаҙарма, Qaźarma) is a rural locality (a selo) in Starotukmaklinsky Selsoviet, Kushnarenkovsky District, Bashkortostan, Russia. The population was 510 as of 2010. There are 5 streets.

== Geography ==
Kazarma is located 28 km south of Kushnarenkovo (the district's administrative centre) by road. Uguzevo is the nearest rural locality.
