= Yaparka =

Yaparka Япарка
- Village
- Location within Bashkortostan Location within Russia
- Coordinates: 55°08′N 55°20′E
- Country: Russia
- Region: Bashkortostan
- District: Kushnarenkovsky District
- Time zone: UTC+5:00

Yaparka (Russian: Япарка; Bashkir: Япар, Yapar) is a rural locality (a village) in Kushnarenkovsky Selsoviet, Kushnarenkovsky District, Bashkortostan, Russia. The population was 83 as of 2010. There are 2 streets.

== Geography ==
Yaparka is located 5 km north of Kushnarenkovo (the district's administrative centre) by road. Kushnarenkovo is the nearest rural locality.
