= Mamyakovo =

Mamyakovo Мамяково
- Village
- Location within Bashkortostan Location within Russia
- Coordinates: 54°59′N 54°34′E
- Country: Russia
- Region: Bashkortostan
- District: Kushnarenkovsky District
- Time zone: UTC+5:00

Mamyakovo (Russian: Мамяково; Bashkir: Мәмәк, Mämäk) is a rural locality (a village) in Sharipovsky Selsoviet, Kushnarenkovsky District, Bashkortostan, Russia. The population was 437 as of 2010. There are 12 streets.

== Geography ==
Mamyakovo is located 25 km southeast of Kushnarenkovo (the district's administrative centre) by road. Nizhneakbashevo is the nearest rural locality.
