= Chukrakly =

Chukrakly Чукраклы
- Selo
- Location within Bashkortostan Location within Russia
- Coordinates: 54°21′N 55°17′E
- Country: Russia
- Region: Bashkortostan
- District: Chishminsky District
- Time zone: UTC+5:00

Chukrakly (Russian: Чукраклы; Bashkir: Суҡраҡлы, Suqraqlı) is a rural locality (a selo) in Durasovsky Selsoviet, Chishminsky District, Bashkortostan, Russia. The population of this rural locality was 130 as of 2010. There is 1 street.

== Geography ==
Chukrakly is located 31 km south of Chishmy, the district's administrative centre. Albeyevo is the nearest rural locality.
