= Staroyumranovo =

Staroyumranovo Староюмраново
- Village
- Location within Bashkortostan Location within Russia
- Coordinates: 55°05′N 55°05′E
- Country: Russia
- Region: Bashkortostan
- District: Kushnarenkovsky District
- Time zone: UTC+5:00

Staroyumranovo (Russian: Староюмраново; Bashkir: Иҫке Йомран, İśke Yomran) is a rural locality (a village) in Rasmekeyevsky Selsoviet, Kushnarenkovsky District, Bashkortostan, Russia. The population was 94 as of 2010. There are 2 streets.

== Geography ==
Staroyumranovo is located 22 km west of Kushnarenkovo (the district's administrative centre) by road. Rasmekeyevo is the nearest rural locality.
