= Novye Yabalakly =

Novye Yabalakly Новые Ябалаклы
- Village
- Location within Bashkortostan Location within Russia
- Coordinates: 54°24′N 55°18′E
- Country: Russia
- Region: Bashkortostan
- District: Chishminsky District
- Time zone: UTC+5:00

Novye Yabalakly (Russian: Новые Ябалаклы; Bashkir: Яңы Ябалаҡлы, Yañı Yabalaqlı) is a rural locality (a village) in Durasovsky Selsoviet, Chishminsky District, Bashkortostan, Russia. The rural locality has 2 streets and, as of 2010, a population of 66.

== Geography ==
Novye Yabalakly is 26 km south of Chishmy, the district's administrative centre. Dim is the nearest rural locality.
