= Kerenyovo =

Kerenyovo Керенёво
- Selo
- Location within Bashkortostan Location within Russia
- Coordinates: 55°08′N 55°37′E
- Country: Russia
- Region: Bashkortostan
- District: Kushnarenkovsky District
- Time zone: UTC+5:00

Kerenyovo (Russian: Керенёво; Bashkir: Керән, Kerän) is a rural locality (a selo) in Akhmetovsky Selsoviet, Kushnarenkovsky District, Bashkortostan, Russia. The population was 40 as of 2010. There are 5 streets.

== Geography ==
Kerenyovo is located 26 km northeast of Kushnarenkovo (the district's administrative centre) by road. Akhlystino is the nearest rural locality.
