= Beykeyevo =

Beykeyevo Бейкеево
- Village
- Location within Bashkortostan Location within Russia
- Coordinates: 54°57′N 55°04′E
- Country: Russia
- Region: Bashkortostan
- District: Kushnarenkovsky District
- Time zone: UTC+5:00

Beykeyevo (Russian: Бейкеево; Bashkir: Бәйкей, Bäykey) is a rural locality (a village) in Starokurmashevsky Selsoviet, Kushnarenkovsky District, Bashkortostan, Russia. The population was 170 as of 2010. There are 3 streets.

== Geography ==
Beykeyevo is located 28 km southwest of Kushnarenkovo (the district's administrative centre) by road. Verkhnesaitovo is the nearest rural locality.
