= Uguzevo, Kushnarenkovsky District, Republic of Bashkortostan =

Uguzevo Угузево
- Village
- Location within Bashkortostan Location within Russia
- Coordinates: 54°56′N 55°19′E
- Country: Russia
- Region: Bashkortostan
- District: Kushnarenkovsky District
- Time zone: UTC+5:00

Uguzevo (Russian: Угузево; Bashkir: Үгеҙ, Ügeź) is a rural locality (a village) in Starotukmaklinsky Selsoviet, Kushnarenkovsky District, Bashkortostan, Russia. The population was 304 as of 2010. There are 5 streets.

== Geography ==
Uguzevo is located 25 km south of Kushnarenkovo (the district's administrative centre) by road. Kazarma is the nearest rural locality.
