= Petryayevo =

Petryayevo Петряево
- Selo
- Location within Bashkortostan Location within Russia
- Coordinates: 54°20′N 55°35′E
- Country: Russia
- Region: Bashkortostan
- District: Chishminsky District
- Time zone: UTC+5:00

Petryayevo (Russian: Петряево) is a rural locality (a selo) in Ibragimovsky Selsoviet, Chishminsky District, Bashkortostan, Russia. The population was 255 as of 2010. There are 4 streets.

== Geography ==
Petryayevo is 39 km southeast of Chishmy, the district's administrative seat. Adzitarovo is the nearest rural locality.
