= Balagushevo =

Balagushevo Балагушево
- Selo
- Location within Bashkortostan Location within Russia
- Coordinates: 54°26′N 55°44′E
- Country: Russia
- Region: Bashkortostan
- District: Chishminsky District
- Time zone: UTC+5:00

Balagushevo (Russian: Балагушево; Bashkir: Балағуш, Balağuş) is a rural locality (a selo) in Yengalyshevsky Selsoviet, Chishminsky District, Bashkortostan, Russia. The population was 241 as of 2010. The rural locality has 5 streets.

== Geography ==
Balagushevo is located 48 km southeast of Chishmy, the district's administrative centre. Semyonovka is the nearest rural locality.
