= Tolbazy =

Tolbazy (Russian: Толбазы) is the name of two rural localities in the Republic of Bashkortostan, Russia:

- Tolbazy, Aurgazinsky District, Republic of Bashkortostan, a selo in Aurgazinsky District
- Tolbazy, Kushnarenkovsky District, Republic of Bashkortostan, a village in Kushnarenkovsky District
