= Kuvykovo =

Kuvykovo Кувыково
- Selo
- Location within Bashkortostan Location within Russia
- Coordinates: 55°03′N 55°39′E
- Country: Russia
- Region: Bashkortostan
- District: Kushnarenkovsky District
- Time zone: UTC+5:00

Kuvykovo (Russian: Кувыково) is a rural locality (a selo) in Akhmetovsky Selsoviet, Kushnarenkovsky District, Bashkortostan, Russia. The population was 294 as of 2010. There are 9 streets.

== Geography ==
Kuvykovo is located 28 km southeast of Kushnarenkovo (the district's administrative centre) by road. Medvederovo is the nearest rural locality.
