= Saitovo =

Saitovo Саитово
- Village
- Location within Bashkortostan Location within Russia
- Coordinates: 55°16′N 55°01′E
- Country: Russia
- Region: Bashkortostan
- District: Kushnarenkovsky District
- Time zone: UTC+5:00

Saitovo (Russian: Саитово; Bashkir: Сәйет, Säyet) is a rural locality (a village) in Gorkovsky Selsoviet, Kushnarenkovsky District, Bashkortostan, Russia. The population was 257 as of 2010. There are 2 streets.

== Geography ==
Saitovo is located 34 km northwest of Kushnarenkovo (the district's administrative centre) by road. Mars is the nearest rural locality.
