= Novousmanovo, Chishminsky District, Republic of Bashkortostan =

Novousmanovo Новоусманово
- Village
- Location within Bashkortostan Location within Russia
- Coordinates: 54°26′N 55°15′E
- Country: Russia
- Region: Bashkortostan
- District: Chishminsky District
- Time zone: UTC+5:00

Novousmanovo (Russian: Новоусманово; Bashkir: Яңы Уҫман, Yañı Uśman) is a rural locality (a village) in Shingak-Kulsky Selsoviet, Chishminsky District, Bashkortostan, Russia. The village has 4 streets and, as of 2010, a population of 190.

== Geography ==
Novousmanovo is located 19 km southwest of Chishmy, the district's administrative centre. Verkhnekhozyatovo is the nearest rural locality.
