= Teperishevo =

Teperishevo Теперишево
- Selo
- Location within Bashkortostan Location within Russia
- Coordinates: 54°19′N 55°23′E
- Country: Russia
- Region: Bashkortostan
- District: Chishminsky District
- Time zone: UTC+5:00

Teperishevo (Russian: Теперишево; Bashkir: Тәпәреш, Täpäreş) is a rural locality (a selo) in Chuvalkipovsky Selsoviet, Chishminsky District, Bashkortostan, Russia. The population was 437 as of 2010. There are 8 streets.

== Geography ==
Teperishevo is located 43 km south of Chishmy (the district's administrative centre) by road. Chuvalkipovo is the nearest rural locality.
