= Karamaly, Chishminsky District, Republic of Bashkortostan =

Karamaly Карамалы
- Village
- Location within Bashkortostan Location within Russia
- Coordinates: 54°33′N 55°09′E
- Country: Russia
- Region: Bashkortostan
- District: Chishminsky District
- Time zone: UTC+5:00

Karamaly (Russian: Карамалы; Bashkir: Ҡарамалы, Qaramalı) is a rural locality (a village) in Safarovsky Selsoviet, Chishminsky District, Bashkortostan, Russia. The village has 3 streets and, as of 2010, a population of 71.

== Geography ==
Karamaly is located 20 km southwest of Chishmy, the district's administrative seat. Yashikey is the nearest rural locality.
