= Salikhovo, Chishminsky District, Republic of Bashkortostan =

Salikhovo Салихово
- Selo
- Location within Bashkortostan Location within Russia
- Coordinates: 54°41′N 55°32′E
- Country: Russia
- Region: Bashkortostan
- District: Chishminsky District
- Time zone: UTC+5:00

Salikhovo (Russian: Салихово; Bashkir: Сәлих, Sälix) is a rural locality (a selo) in Alkinsky Selsoviet, Chishminsky District, Bashkortostan, Russia. The population was 252 as of 2010. There are 4 streets.

== Geography ==
Sanzharovka is located 22 km northeast of Chishmy (the district's administrative centre) by road. Urazbakhty is the nearest rural locality.
