= Kakhnovka =

Kakhnovka Кахновка
- Selo
- Location within Bashkortostan Location within Russia
- Coordinates: 54°46′N 55°22′E
- Country: Russia
- Region: Bashkortostan
- District: Chishminsky District
- Time zone: UTC+5:00

Kakhnovka (Russian: Кахновка) is a rural locality (a selo) in Dmitriyevsky Selsoviet, Chishminsky District, Bashkortostan, Russia. The population was 43 as of 2010. There are 2 streets.

== Geography ==
Kakhnovka is located 24 km north of Chishmy, the district's administrative centre. Dmitriyevka is the nearest rural locality.
