= Gurgureyevo =

Gurgureyevo Гургуреево
- Village
- Location within Bashkortostan Location within Russia
- Coordinates: 55°00′N 55°21′E
- Country: Russia
- Region: Bashkortostan
- District: Kushnarenkovsky District
- Time zone: UTC+5:00

Gurgureyevo (Russian: Гургуреево; Bashkir: Гөргөрөй, Görgöröy) is a rural locality (a village) in Sharipovsky Selsoviet, Kushnarenkovsky District, Bashkortostan, Russia. The population was 145 as of 2010. There are 5 streets.

== Geography ==
Gurgureyevo is located 18 km south of Kushnarenkovo (the district's administrative centre) by road. Novye Tukmakly is the nearest rural locality.
