= Verkhnekhozyatovo =

Verkhnekhozyatovo Верхнехозятово
- Village
- Location within Bashkortostan Location within Russia
- Coordinates: 54°26′N 55°16′E
- Country: Russia
- Region: Bashkortostan
- District: Chishminsky District
- Time zone: UTC+5:00

Verkhnekhozyatovo (Russian: Верхнехозятово; Bashkir: Үрге Хәжәт, Ürge Xäjät) is a rural locality (a village) in Shingak-Kulsky Selsoviet, Chishminsky District, Bashkortostan, Russia. The population was 91 as of 2010. There is 1 street.

== Geography ==
Verkhnekhozyatovo is located 21 km southwest of Chishmy (the district's administrative centre) by road. Durasovo is the nearest rural locality.
