= Kyzylga =

Kyzylga Кызылга
- Selo
- Location within Bashkortostan Location within Russia
- Coordinates: 54°24′N 55°26′E
- Country: Russia
- Region: Bashkortostan
- District: Chishminsky District
- Time zone: UTC+5:00

Kyzylga (Russian: Кызылга; Bashkir: Ҡыҙылғы, Qıźılğı) is a rural locality (a selo) in Chuvalkipovsky Selsoviet, Chishminsky District, Bashkortostan, Russia. The population was 61 as of 2010. There are 2 streets.

== Geography ==
Kyzylga is 40 km south of Chishmy, the district's administrative seat. Abrayevo is the nearest rural locality.
