= Verkhnesaitovo =

Verkhnesaitovo Верхнесаитово
- Village
- Location within Bashkortostan Location within Russia
- Coordinates: 54°58′N 54°59′E
- Country: Russia
- Region: Bashkortostan
- District: Kushnarenkovsky District
- Time zone: UTC+5:00

Verkhnesaitovo (Russian: Верхнесаитово; Bashkir: Үрге Сәйет, Ürge Säyet) is a rural locality (a village) in Bakayevsky Selsoviet, Kushnarenkovsky District, Bashkortostan, Russia. The population was 242 as of 2010. There are 2 streets.

== Geography ==
Verkhnesaitovo is located 31 km southwest of Kushnarenkovo (the district's administrative centre) by road. Nizhnesaitovo is the nearest rural locality.
