= Arovo =

Arovo Арово
- Village
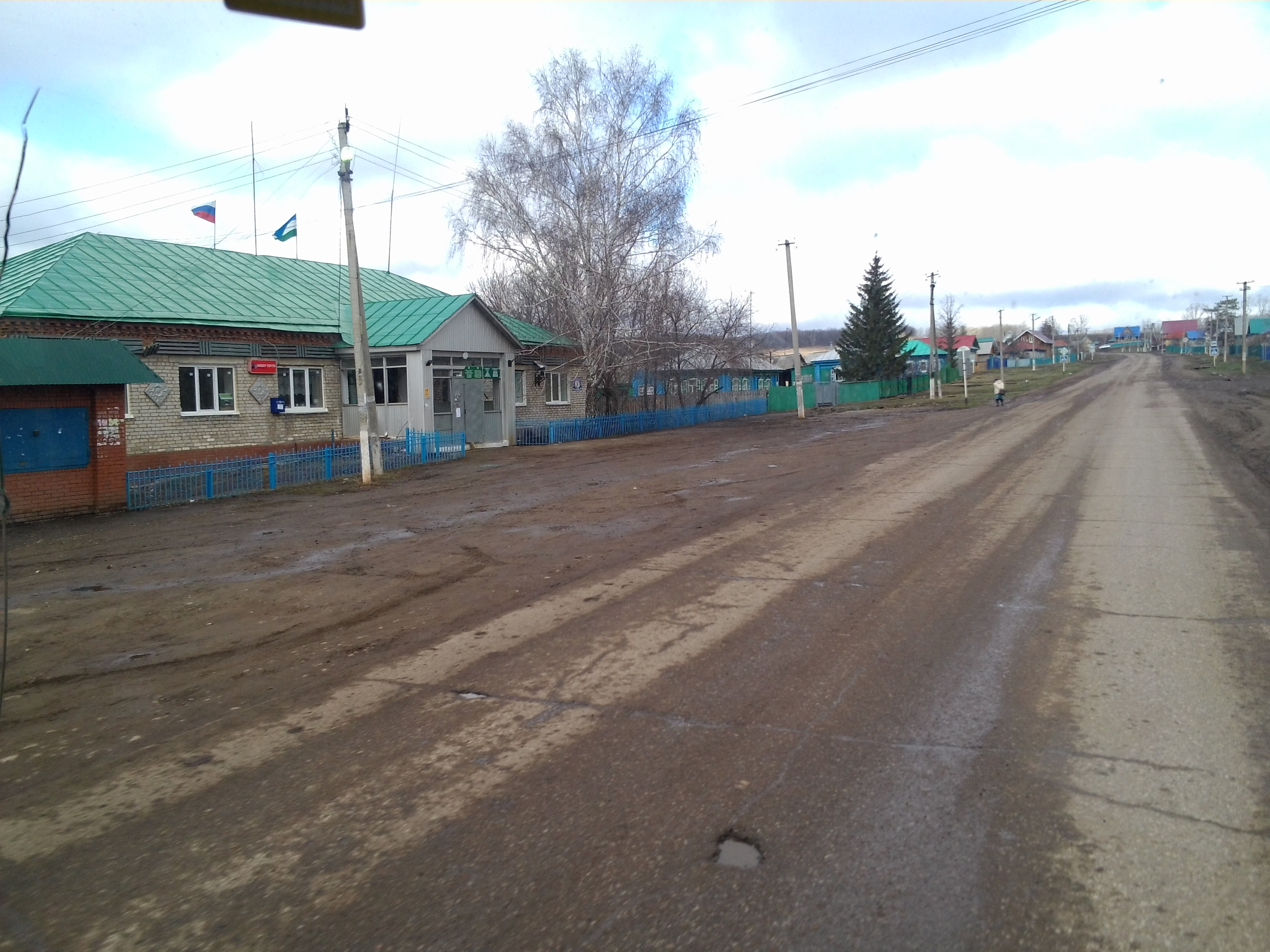
- Arovo

- Location within Bashkortostan Location within Russia
- Coordinates: 54°34′N 55°35′E
- Country: Russia
- Region: Bashkortostan
- District: Chishminsky District
- Time zone: UTC+5:00

Arovo (Russian: Арово; Bashkir: Ар, Ar) is a rural locality (a village) and the administrative centre of Arovsky Selsoviet, Chishminsky District, Bashkortostan, Russia. The population of the village was 594 as of 2010. There are 16 streets.

== Geography ==
Arovo is located 18 km east of Chishmy, the district's administrative seat. Chernigovka is the nearest rural locality.
