= Srednekhozyatovo =

Srednekhozyatovo Среднехозятово
- Village
- Location within Bashkortostan Location within Russia
- Coordinates: 54°28′N 55°16′E
- Country: Russia
- Region: Bashkortostan
- District: Chishminsky District
- Time zone: UTC+5:00

Srednekhozyatovo (Russian: Среднехозятово; Bashkir: Урта Хәжәт, Urta Xäjät) is a rural locality (village) located in Shingak-Kulsky Selsoviet, Chishminsky District, Bashkortostan, Russia. It has a population of 202 as of 2010. The village consists of three streets.

== Geography ==
Srednekhozyatovo is situated 22 km southwest of Chishmy, which serves as the administrative center of the district. The nearest rural locality is Udryak.
