= Isakovka =

Isakovka Исаковка
- Village
- Location within Bashkortostan Location within Russia
- Coordinates: 54°31′N 55°22′E
- Country: Russia
- Region: Bashkortostan
- District: Chishminsky District
- Time zone: UTC+5:00

Isakovka (Russian: Исаковка) is a rural locality (a village) in Chishminsky Selsoviet, Chishminsky District, Bashkortostan, Russia. The village has 3 streets and, as of 2010, a population of 8.

== Geography ==
Isakovka is located 15 km south of Chishmy, the administrative seat of the district. Kuchumovo is the nearest rural locality.
