= Novyye Kamyshly =

Novyye Kamyshly Новые Камышлы
- Village
- Location within Bashkortostan Location within Russia
- Coordinates: 54°59′N 55°51′E
- Country: Russia
- Region: Bashkortostan
- District: Kushnarenkovsky District
- Time zone: UTC+5:00

Novyye Kamyshly (Russian: Новые Камышлы; Bashkir: Яңы Ҡамышлы, Yañı Qamışlı) is a rural locality (a village) in Starokamyshlinsky Selsoviet, Kushnarenkovsky District, Bashkortostan, Russia. The population was 53 as of 2010. There is 1 street.

== Geography ==
Novyye Kamyshly is located 48 km southeast of Kushnarenkovo (the district's administrative centre) by road. Beryozovka is the nearest rural locality.
