= Kalmashevo =

Kalmashevo Калмашево
- Selo
- Location within Bashkortostan Location within Russia
- Coordinates: 54°39′N 55°13′E
- Country: Russia
- Region: Bashkortostan
- District: Chishminsky District
- Time zone: UTC+5:00

Kalmashevo (Russian: Калмашево; Bashkir: Ҡалмаш, Qalmaş) is a rural locality (a selo) in Yeremeyevsky Selsoviet, Chishminsky District, Bashkortostan, Russia. The rural locality has 11 streets and, as of 2010, a population of 686.

== Geography ==
Kalmashevo is 14 km northwest of Chishmy, the district's administrative centre. Yeremeyevo is the nearest rural locality.
