= Chishminsky =

Chishminsky (masculine), Chishminskaya (feminine), or Chishminskoye (neuter) may refer to:

- Chishminsky District, a district of the Republic of Bashkortostan, Russia
- Chishminsky Settlement Council, an administrative division of Chishminsky District in the Republic of Bashkortostan, Russia which the work settlement of Chishmy is incorporated as
- Chishminsky Urban Settlement, a municipal formation which Chishminsky Settlement Council in Chishminsky District of the Republic of Bashkortostan, Russia is incorporated as
