= Verkhneakbashevo =

Verkhneakbashevo Верхнеакбашево
- Village
- Location within Bashkortostan Location within Russia
- Coordinates: 54°57′N 55°30′E
- Country: Russia
- Region: Bashkortostan
- District: Kushnarenkovsky District
- Time zone: UTC+5:00

Verkhneakbashevo (Russian: Верхнеакбашево; Bashkir: Үрге Аҡбаш, Ürge Aqbaş) is a rural locality (a village) in Sharipovsky Selsoviet, Kushnarenkovsky District, Bashkortostan, Russia. The population was 86 as of 2010. There are 3 streets.

== Geography ==
Verkhneakbashevo is located 29 km southeast of Kushnarenkovo (the district's administrative centre) by road. Voyetskoye is the nearest rural locality.
