= Akhta, Republic of Bashkortostan =

Akhta Ахта
- Village
- Location within Bashkortostan Location within Russia
- Coordinates: 55°02′N 55°15′E
- Country: Russia
- Region: Bashkortostan
- District: Kushnarenkovsky District
- Time zone: UTC+5:00

Akhta (Russian: Ахта; Bashkir: Ахта, Axta) is a rural locality (a village) in Starokurmashevsky Selsoviet, Kushnarenkovsky District, Bashkortostan, Russia. The population was 73 as of 2010. There is 1 street.

== Geography ==
Akhta is located 11 km southwest of Kushnarenkovo (the district's administrative centre) by road. Novye Tukmakly is the nearest rural locality.
