= Karatyaki =

Karatyaki Каратяки
- Selo
- Location within Bashkortostan Location within Russia
- Coordinates: 54°57′N 55°13′E
- Country: Russia
- Region: Bashkortostan
- District: Kushnarenkovsky District
- Time zone: UTC+5:00

Karatyaki (Russian: Каратяки; Bashkir: Ҡаратәкә, Qaratäkä) is a rural locality (a selo) in Starotukmaklinsky Selsoviet, Kushnarenkovsky District, Bashkortostan, Russia. The population was 370 as of 2010. There are 4 streets.

== Geography ==
Karatyaki is located 21 km southwest of Kushnarenkovo (the district's administrative centre) by road. Syultyup is the nearest rural locality.
