= Marusino =

Marusino Марусино
- Village
- Location within Bashkortostan Location within Russia
- Coordinates: 54°31′N 55°32′E
- Country: Russia
- Region: Bashkortostan
- District: Chishminsky District
- Time zone: UTC+5:00

Marusino (Russian: Марусино) is a rural locality (a village) in Arovsky Selsoviet, Chishminsky District, Bashkortostan, Russia. The village has 2 streets and, as of 2010, a population of 8.

== Geography ==
Marusino is located 19 km southeast of Chishmy, the district's administrative centre. Babikovo is the nearest rural locality.
