= Kanly, Kushnarenkovsky District, Republic of Bashkortostan =

Kanly Канлы
- Selo
- Location within Bashkortostan Location within Russia
- Coordinates: 55°06′N 55°32′E
- Country: Russia
- Region: Bashkortostan
- District: Kushnarenkovsky District
- Time zone: UTC+5:00

Kanly (Russian: Канлы; Bashkir: Ҡаңлы, Qañlı) is a rural locality (a selo) in Akhmetovsky Selsoviet, Kushnarenkovsky District, Bashkortostan, Russia. The population was 208 as of 2010. There are 3 streets.

== Geography ==
Kanly is located 20 km east of Kushnarenkovo (the district's administrative centre) by road. Akhmetovo is the nearest rural locality.
