= Bakhchi =

Bakhchi Бахчи
- Village
- Location within Bashkortostan Location within Russia
- Coordinates: 54°40′N 55°33′E
- Country: Russia
- Region: Bashkortostan
- District: Chishminsky District
- Time zone: UTC+5:00

Bakhchi (Russian: Бахчи; Bashkir: Баҡса, Baqsa) is a rural locality (a village) in Alkinsky Selsoviet, Chishminsky District, Bashkortostan, Russia. The population was 88 as of 2010. The village has 1 street.

== Geography ==
Bakhchi is located 23 km northeast of Chishmy, the district's administrative centre. Uzytamak is the nearest rural locality.
