= Chirsha-Tartysh =

Chirsha-Tartysh Чирша-Тартыш
- Selo
- Location within Bashkortostan Location within Russia
- Coordinates: 55°09′N 55°08′E
- Country: Russia
- Region: Bashkortostan
- District: Kushnarenkovsky District
- Time zone: UTC+5:00

Chirsha-Tartysh (Russian: Чирша-Тартыш; Bashkir: Шыршы-Тартыш, Şırşı-Tartış) is a rural locality (a selo) in Karacha-Yelginsky Selsoviet, Kushnarenkovsky District, Bashkortostan, Russia. The population was 366 as of 2010. There are 4 streets.

== Geography ==
Chirsha-Tartysh is located 18 km northwest of Kushnarenkovo (the district's administrative centre) by road. Karacha-Yelga is the nearest rural locality.
