= Taraberdino =

Taraberdino Тарабердино
- Selo
- Location within Bashkortostan Location within Russia
- Coordinates: 55°05′N 55°23′E
- Country: Russia
- Region: Bashkortostan
- District: Kushnarenkovsky District
- Time zone: UTC+5:00

Taraberdino (Russian: Тарабердино; Bashkir: Тарабирҙе, Tarabirźe) is a rural locality (a selo) in Kushnarenkovsky Selsoviet, Kushnarenkovsky District, Bashkortostan, Russia. The population was 1,576 as of 2010. There are 32 streets.

== Geography ==
Taraberdino is located 3 km southeast of Kushnarenkovo (the district's administrative centre) by road. Kushnarenkovo is the nearest rural locality.
