= Karan-Yelga, Chishminsky District, Republic of Bashkortostan =

Karan-Yelga Каран-Елга
- Selo
- Location within Bashkortostan Location within Russia
- Coordinates: 54°30′N 55°39′E
- Country: Russia
- Region: Bashkortostan
- District: Chishminsky District
- Time zone: UTC+5:00

Karan-Yelga (Russian: Каран-Елга; Bashkir: Ҡаранйылға, Qaranyılğa) is a rural locality (a selo) in Novotroitsky Selsoviet, Chishminsky District, Bashkortostan, Russia. The rural locality has 2 streets and, as of 2010, a population of 130.

== Geography ==
Karan-Yelga is 32 km southeast of Chishmy, the district's administrative centre. Sayranovo is the nearest rural locality.
