= Krasny Oktyabr, Chishminsky District, Republic of Bashkortostan =

Krasny Oktyabr Красный Октябрь
- Village
- Location within Bashkortostan Location within Russia
- Coordinates: 54°44′N 55°22′E
- Country: Russia
- Region: Bashkortostan
- District: Chishminsky District
- Time zone: UTC+5:00

Krasny Oktyabr (Russian: Красный Октябрь) is a rural locality (a village) in Dmitriyevsky Selsoviet, Chishminsky District, Bashkortostan, Russia. The population was 13 as of 2010. There is 1 street.

== Geography ==
Krasny Oktyabr is 18 km north of Chishmy, the district's administrative centre. Novotroyevka is the nearest rural locality.
