= Barsuanbashevo =

Barsuanbashevo Барсуанбашево
- Selo
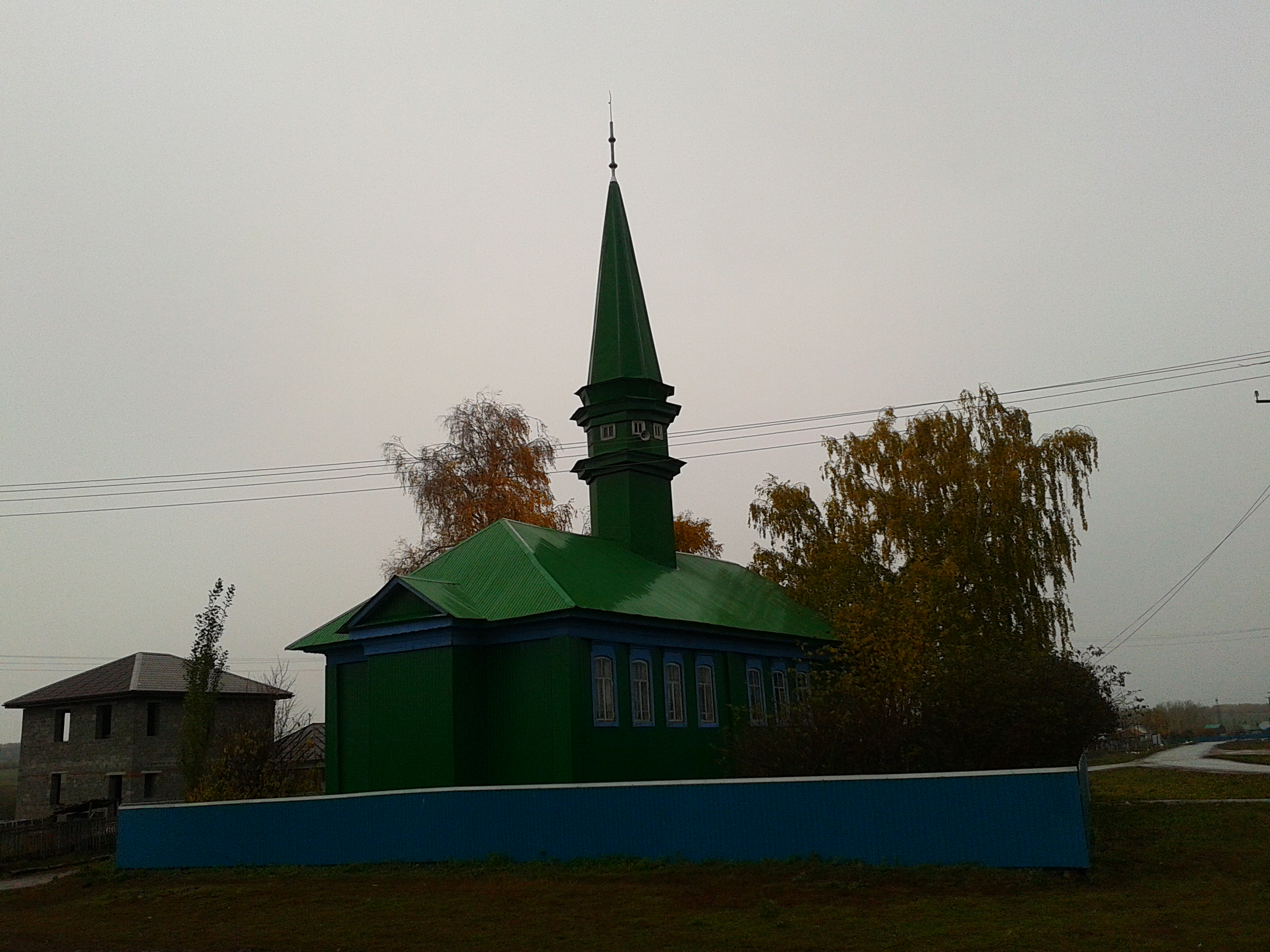
- Barsuanbashevo Mosque

- Location within Bashkortostan Location within Russia
- Coordinates: 54°28′N 55°35′E
- Country: Russia
- Region: Bashkortostan
- District: Chishminsky District
- Time zone: UTC+5:00

Barsuanbashevo (Russian: Барсуанбашево; Bashkir: Бәрҫеүәнбаш, Bärśewänbaş) is a rural locality (a selo) in Novotroitsky Selsoviet, Chishminsky District, Bashkortostan, Russia. The population was 265 as of 2010. There are 6 streets.

== Geography ==
Barsuanbashevo is located 27 km southeast of Chishmy, the district's administrative centre. Novosayranovo is the nearest rural locality.
