= Novoakbashevo =

Novoakbashevo Новоакбашево
- Village
- Location within Bashkortostan Location within Russia
- Coordinates: 54°50′N 55°16′E
- Country: Russia
- Region: Bashkortostan
- District: Kushnarenkovsky District
- Time zone: UTC+5:00

Novoakbashevo (Russian: Новоакбашево; Bashkir: Яңы Аҡбаш, Yañı Aqbaş) is a rural locality (a village) in Starogumerovsky Selsoviet, Kushnarenkovsky District, Bashkortostan, Russia. The population was 54 as of 2010. There are 3 streets.

== Geography ==
Novoakbashevo is located 35 km south of Kushnarenkovo (the district's administrative centre) by road. Starogumerovo is the nearest rural locality.
