= Karacha-Yelga =

Karacha-Yelga Карача-Елга
- Selo
- Location within Bashkortostan Location within Russia
- Coordinates: 55°11′N 55°07′E
- Country: Russia
- Region: Bashkortostan
- District: Kushnarenkovsky District
- Time zone: UTC+5:00

Karacha-Yelga (Russian: Карача-Елга; Bashkir: Ҡарасайылға, Qarasayılğa) is a rural locality (a selo) and the administrative centre of Karacha-Yelginsky Selsoviet, Kushnarenkovsky District, Bashkortostan, Russia. The population was 600 as of 2010. There are 8 streets.

== Geography ==
Karacha-Yelga is located 23 km northwest of Kushnarenkovo (the district's administrative centre) by road. Chirsha-Tartysh is the nearest rural locality.
