= Bishkazi =

Bishkazi Бишкази
- Selo
- Location within Bashkortostan Location within Russia
- Coordinates: 54°46′N 55°15′E
- Country: Russia
- Region: Bashkortostan
- District: Chishminsky District
- Time zone: UTC+5:00

Bishkazi (Russian: Бишкази; Bashkir: Бишкәзә, Bişkäzä) is a rural locality (a selo) in Dmitriyevsky Selsoviet, Chishminsky District, Bashkortostan, Russia. The population was 285 as of 2010. There are 7 streets in this rural locality.

== Geography ==
Bishkazi is located 31 km north of Chishmy, the district's administrative centre. Vostochny is the nearest rural locality.
