= Gurovka =

Gurovka Гуровка
- Selo
- Location within Bashkortostan Location within Russia
- Coordinates: 54°58′N 55°39′E
- Country: Russia
- Region: Bashkortostan
- District: Kushnarenkovsky District
- Time zone: UTC+5:00

Gurovka (Russian: Гуровка) is a rural locality (a selo) in Starokamyshlinsky Selsoviet, Kushnarenkovsky District, Bashkortostan, Russia. The population was 76 as of 2010. There are 10 streets.

== Geography ==
Gurovka is located 31 km southeast of Kushnarenkovo (the district's administrative centre) by road. Starye Kamyshly is the nearest rural locality.
