= Nizhneakbashevo =

Nizhneakbashevo Нижнеакбашево
- Village
- Location within Bashkortostan Location within Russia
- Coordinates: 54°58′N 55°33′E
- Country: Russia
- Region: Bashkortostan
- District: Kushnarenkovsky District
- Time zone: UTC+5:00

Nizhneakbashevo (Russian: Нижнеакбашево; Bashkir: Түбән Аҡбаш, Tübän Aqbaş) is a rural locality (a village) in Sharipovsky Selsoviet, Kushnarenkovsky District, Bashkortostan, Russia. The population was 184 as of 2010. There are 13 streets.

== Geography ==
Nizhneakbashevo is located 26 km southeast of Kushnarenkovo (the district's administrative centre) by road. Sredneakbashevo is the nearest rural locality.
