= Ekaterinoslavka =

Ekaterinoslavka Екатеринославка
- Village
- Location within Bashkortostan Location within Russia
- Coordinates: 54°25′N 55°07′E
- Country: Russia
- Region: Bashkortostan
- District: Chishminsky District
- Time zone: UTC+5:00

Ekaterinoslavka (Russian: Екатеринославка) is a rural locality (a village) in Shingak-Kulsky Selsoviet, Chishminsky District, Bashkortostan, Russia. The population was 34 as of 2010. There is 1 street.

== Geography ==
Ekaterinoslavka is 17 km south of Chishmy, the district's administrative centre.
