= Novosayranovo =

Novosayranovo Новосайраново
- Village
- Location within Bashkortostan Location within Russia
- Coordinates: 54°28′N 55°34′E
- Country: Russia
- Region: Bashkortostan
- District: Chishminsky District
- Time zone: UTC+5:00

Novosayranovo (Russian: Новосайраново; Bashkir: Яңы Сайран, Yañı Sayran) is a rural locality (a village) in Novotroitsky Selsoviet, Chishminsky District, Bashkortostan, Russia. The population was 24 as of 2010. There is 1 street.

== Geography ==
Novosayranovo is located 25 km southeast of Chishmy, the district's administrative seat. Barsunbashevo is the nearest rural locality.
