= Ilmurzino =

Ilmurzino Ильмурзино
- Village
- Location within Bashkortostan Location within Russia
- Coordinates: 54°57′N 55°47′E
- Country: Russia
- Region: Bashkortostan
- District: Kushnarenkovsky District
- Time zone: UTC+5:00

Ilmurzino (Russian: Ильмурзино; Bashkir: Илмырҙа, İlmırźa) is a rural locality (a village) in Starokamyshlinsky Selsoviet, Kushnarenkovsky District, Bashkortostan, Russia. The population was 297 as of 2010. There are 9 streets.

== Geography ==
Ilmurzino is located 42 km southeast of Kushnarenkovo (the district's administrative centre) by road. Starye Kamyshly is the nearest rural locality.
