= Novomusino, Chishminsky District, Republic of Bashkortostan =

Novomusino Новомусино
- Selo
- Location within Bashkortostan Location within Russia
- Coordinates: 54°28′N 55°29′E
- Country: Russia
- Region: Bashkortostan
- District: Chishminsky District
- Time zone: UTC+5:00

Novomusino (Russian: Новомусино; Bashkir: Яңы Муса, Yañı Musa) is a rural locality (a selo) in Novotroitsky Selsoviet, Chishminsky District, Bashkortostan, Russia. The rural locality has 2 streets. As of 2010, it had a population of 222.

== Geography ==
Novomusino is 24 km southeast of Chishmy, the district's administrative centre. Novotroitskoye is the nearest rural locality.
