= Pasyakovka =

Pasyakovka Пасяковка
- Village
- Location within Bashkortostan Location within Russia
- Coordinates: 54°25′N 55°09′E
- Country: Russia
- Region: Bashkortostan
- District: Chishminsky District
- Time zone: UTC+5:00

Pasyakovka (Russian: Пасяковка) is a rural locality (a village) in Shingak-Kulsky Selsoviet, Chishminsky District, Bashkortostan, Russia. The population was 28 as of 2010. There is 1 street.

== Geography ==
Pasyakovka is located 28 km southwest of Chishmy, the district's administrative seat. Sredneusmanovo is the nearest rural locality.
