= Klyucharyovo =

Klyucharyovo Ключарёво
- Village
- Location within Bashkortostan Location within Russia
- Coordinates: 54°36′N 55°37′E
- Country: Russia
- Region: Bashkortostan
- District: Chishminsky District
- Time zone: UTC+5:00

Klyucharyovo (Russian: Ключарёво) is a rural locality (a village) in Chishminsky District, Bashkortostan, Russia. The village has 10 streets and, as of 2010, a population of 70.

== Geography ==
Klyucharyovo is located 32 km east of Chishmy, the district's administrative seat. Sanatoriya Yumatova imeni 15-letiya BASSR is the nearest rural locality.
