= Derevnya Uchkhoza selkhoztekhnikuma =

Derevnya Uchkhoza selkhoztekhnikuma Деревня Учхоза сельхозтехникума
- Village
- Location within Bashkortostan Location within Russia
- Coordinates: 55°04′N 55°24′E
- Country: Russia
- Region: Bashkortostan
- District: Kushnarenkovsky District
- Time zone: UTC+5:00

Derevnya Uchkhoza selkhoztekhnikuma (Russian: Деревня Учхоза сельхозтехникума; Bashkir: Сельхозтехникум учхозы, Selxoztexnikum uçxozı) is a rural locality (a village) in Kushnarenkovsky Selsoviet, Kushnarenkovsky District, Bashkortostan, Russia. The population was 36 as of 2010. There is 1 street.

== Geography ==
The village is located 8 km southeast of Kushnarenkovo (the district's administrative centre) by road. Taraberdino is the nearest rural locality.
