= Kupayevo =

Kupayevo Купаево
- Village
- Location within Bashkortostan Location within Russia
- Coordinates: 55°04′N 55°05′E
- Country: Russia
- Region: Bashkortostan
- District: Kushnarenkovsky District
- Time zone: UTC+5:00

Kupayevo (Russian: Купаево; Bashkir: Ҡупай, Qupay) is a rural locality (a village) in Rasmekeyevsky Selsoviet, Kushnarenkovsky District, Bashkortostan, Russia. The population was 140 as of 2010. There are 4 streets.

== Geography ==
Kupayevo is located 20 km southwest of Kushnarenkovo (the district's administrative centre) by road. Rasmekeyevo is the nearest rural locality.
