= Mars, Kushnarenkovsky District, Republic of Bashkortostan =

Mars Марс
- Village
- Location within Bashkortostan Location within Russia
- Coordinates: 55°14′N 55°02′E
- Country: Russia
- Region: Bashkortostan
- District: Kushnarenkovsky District
- Time zone: UTC+5:00 (CET)

Mars (Russian: Марс) is a rural locality (a village) in Gorkovsky Selsoviet, Kushnarenkovsky District, Bashkortostan, Russia. The population was 78 as of 2010. There is 1 street.

== Geography ==
Mars is located 31 km northwest of Kushnarenkovo (the district's administrative centre) by road. Saitovo is the nearest rural locality.
