= Islanovo =

Islanovo Исланово
- Village
- Location within Bashkortostan Location within Russia
- Coordinates: 55°10′N 55°04′E
- Country: Russia
- Region: Bashkortostan
- District: Kushnarenkovsky District
- Time zone: UTC+5:00

Islanovo (Russian: Исланово; Bashkir: Ислан), İslan) is a rural locality (a village) in Karacha-Yelginsky Selsoviet, Kushnarenkovsky District, Bashkortostan, Russia. The population was 56 as of 2010. There are 2 streets.

== Geography ==
Islanovo is located 27 km northwest of Kushnarenkovo (the district's administrative centre) by road. Tolbazy is the nearest rural locality.
