= Staryye Kamyshly =

Staryye Kamyshly Старые Камышлы
- Selo
- Location within Bashkortostan Location within Russia
- Coordinates: 54°57′N 55°46′E
- Country: Russia
- Region: Bashkortostan
- District: Kushnarenkovsky District
- Time zone: UTC+5:00

Staryye Kamyshly (Russian: Старые Камышлы; Bashkir: Иҫке Ҡамышлы, İśke Qamışlı) is a rural locality (a selo) and the administrative centre of Starokamyshlinsky Selsoviet, Kushnarenkovsky District, Bashkortostan, Russia. The population was 701 as of 2010. There are 48 streets.

== Geography ==
Staryye Kamyshly is located 38 km southeast of Kushnarenkovo (the district's administrative centre) by road. Ilmurzino is the nearest rural locality.
