= Verkhny =

Verkhny Верхний
- Khutor
- Location within Bashkortostan Location within Russia
- Coordinates: 54°26′N 55°02′E
- Country: Russia
- Region: Bashkortostan
- District: Chishminsky District
- Time zone: UTC+5:00

Verkhny (Russian: Верхний; Bashkir: Үрге, Ürge) is a rural locality (a khutor) in Shingak-Kulsky Selsoviet, Chishminsky District, Bashkortostan, Russia. The population was 398 as of 2010. There are 5 streets.

== Geography ==
Verkhny is located 40 km southwest of Chishmy (the district's administrative centre) by road. Nizhny is the nearest rural locality.
