= Ignatovka, Republic of Bashkortostan =

Ignatovka Игнатовка
- Village
- Location within Bashkortostan Location within Russia
- Coordinates: 54°31′N 55°19′E
- Country: Russia
- Region: Bashkortostan
- District: Chishminsky District
- Time zone: UTC+5:00

Ignatovka (Russian: Игнатовка) is a rural locality (a village) in Chishminsky Selsoviet, Chishminsky District, Bashkortostan, Russia. The village has 5 streets and, as of 2010, a population of 364.

== Geography ==
Ignatovka is located 11 km southwest of Chishmy, the administrative center of the district. Isakovka is the nearest rural locality.
