= Dim, Chishminsky District, Republic of Bashkortostan =

Dim Дим
- Village
- Location within Bashkortostan Location within Russia
- Coordinates: 54°23′N 55°18′E
- Country: Russia
- Region: Bashkortostan
- District: Chishminsky District
- Time zone: UTC+5:00

Dim (Bashkir and Russian: Дим) is a rural locality (a village) in Durasovsky Selsoviet, Chishminsky District, Bashkortostan, Russia. The population was 32 as of 2010. There is one street. There is Durasovo and Penza in the North.

== Geography ==
Dim is located 27 km south of Chishmy, the district's administrative seat. Novye Yabalakly is the nearest rural locality.
