= Verkhniye Termy =

Verkhniye Termy Верхние Термы
- Selo
- Location within Bashkortostan Location within Russia
- Coordinates: 54°36′N 55°11′E
- Country: Russia
- Region: Bashkortostan
- District: Chishminsky District
- Time zone: UTC+5:00

Verkhniye Termy (Russian: Верхние Термы; Bashkir: Үрге Тирмә, Ürge Tirmä) is a rural locality (a selo) in Yeremeyevsky Selsoviet, Chishminsky District, Bashkortostan, Russia. The population was 303 as of 2010. There are 6 streets.

== Geography ==
Verkhniye Termy is located 15 km west of Chishmy (the district's administrative centre) by road. Slak is the nearest rural locality.
