= Bardovka =

Selo in Bashkortostan, Russia

Bardovka Бардовка
- Selo
- Location within Bashkortostan Location within Russia
- Coordinates: 55°10′N 55°15′E
- Country: Russia
- Region: Bashkortostan
- District: Kushnarenkovsky District
- Time zone: UTC+5:00

Bardovka (Russian: Бардовка) is a rural locality (a selo) in Matveyevsky Selsoviet, Kushnarenkovsky District, Bashkortostan, Russia. The population was 339 as of 2010. There are 3 streets.

== Geography ==
Bardovka is located 18 km northwest of Kushnarenkovo (the district's administrative centre) by road. Yamskoye is the nearest rural locality.
