= Kushkuak =

Kushkuak Кушкуак
- Village
- Location within Bashkortostan Location within Russia
- Coordinates: 54°29′N 55°13′E
- Country: Russia
- Region: Bashkortostan
- District: Chishminsky District
- Time zone: UTC+5:00

Kushkuak (Russian: Кушкуак; Bashkir: Ҡушкыуаҡ, Quşqıwaq) is a rural locality (a village) in Safarovsky Selsoviet, Chishminsky District, Bashkortostan, Russia. The population was 53 as of 2010. There is 1 street.

== Geography ==
Kushkuak is 19 km southwest of Chishmy, the administrative centre of the district. Udryak is the nearest rural locality.
