= Chuvalkipovo =

Chuvalkipovo Чувалкипово
- Selo
- Location within Bashkortostan Location within Russia
- Coordinates: 54°22′N 55°25′E
- Country: Russia
- Region: Bashkortostan
- District: Chishminsky District
- Time zone: UTC+5:00

Chuvalkipovo (Russian: Чувалкипово; Bashkir: Сыуалкип, Sıwalkip) is a rural locality (a selo) and the administrative centre of Chuvalkipovsky Selsoviet, Chishminsky District, Bashkortostan, Russia. The population was 451 as of 2010. There are 7 streets.

== Geography ==
Chuvalkipovo is located 36 km south of Chishmy, the district's administrative seat. Abrayevo is the nearest rural locality.
