= Novokiyevka, Republic of Bashkortostan =

Novokiyevka Новокиевка
- Selo
- Location within Bashkortostan Location within Russia
- Coordinates: 54°20′N 55°32′E
- Country: Russia
- Region: Bashkortostan
- District: Chishminsky District
- Time zone: UTC+5:00

Novokiyevka (Russian: Новокиевка) is a rural locality (a selo) in Chuvalkipovsky Selsoviet, Chishminsky District, Bashkortostan, Russia. The population was 17 as of 2010. There are 2 streets.

== Geography ==
Novokiyevka is located 41 km south of Chishmy, the district's administrative seat. Romanovka is the nearest rural locality.
