= Yamskoye =

Yamskoye Ямское
- Village
- Location within Bashkortostan Location within Russia
- Coordinates: 55°10′N 55°16′E
- Country: Russia
- Region: Bashkortostan
- District: Kushnarenkovsky District
- Time zone: UTC+5:00

Yamskoye (Russian: Ямское) is a rural locality (a village) in Matveyevsky Selsoviet, Kushnarenkovsky District, Bashkortostan, Russia. The population was 80 as of 2010. There is 1 street.

== Geography ==
Yamskoye is located 21 km northwest of Kushnarenkovo (the district's administrative centre) by road. Bardovka is the nearest rural locality.
