= Novosafarovo, Chishminsky District, Republic of Bashkortostan =

Novosafarovo Новосафарово
- Village
- Location within Bashkortostan Location within Russia
- Coordinates: 54°24′N 55°18′E
- Country: Russia
- Region: Bashkortostan
- District: Chishminsky District
- Time zone: UTC+5:00

Novosafarovo (Russian: Новосафарово; Bashkir: Яңы Сафар, Yañı Safar) is a rural locality (a village) in Chishminsky Selsoviet, Chishminsky District, Bashkortostan, Russia. The population was 172 as of 2010. There are 4 streets.

== Geography ==
Novosafarovo is located 8 km southwest of Chishmy, the district's administrative seat. Chishmy is the nearest rural locality.
