= Bochkaryovka, Chishminsky District, Republic of Bashkortostan =

Bochkaryovka Бочкарёвка
- Village
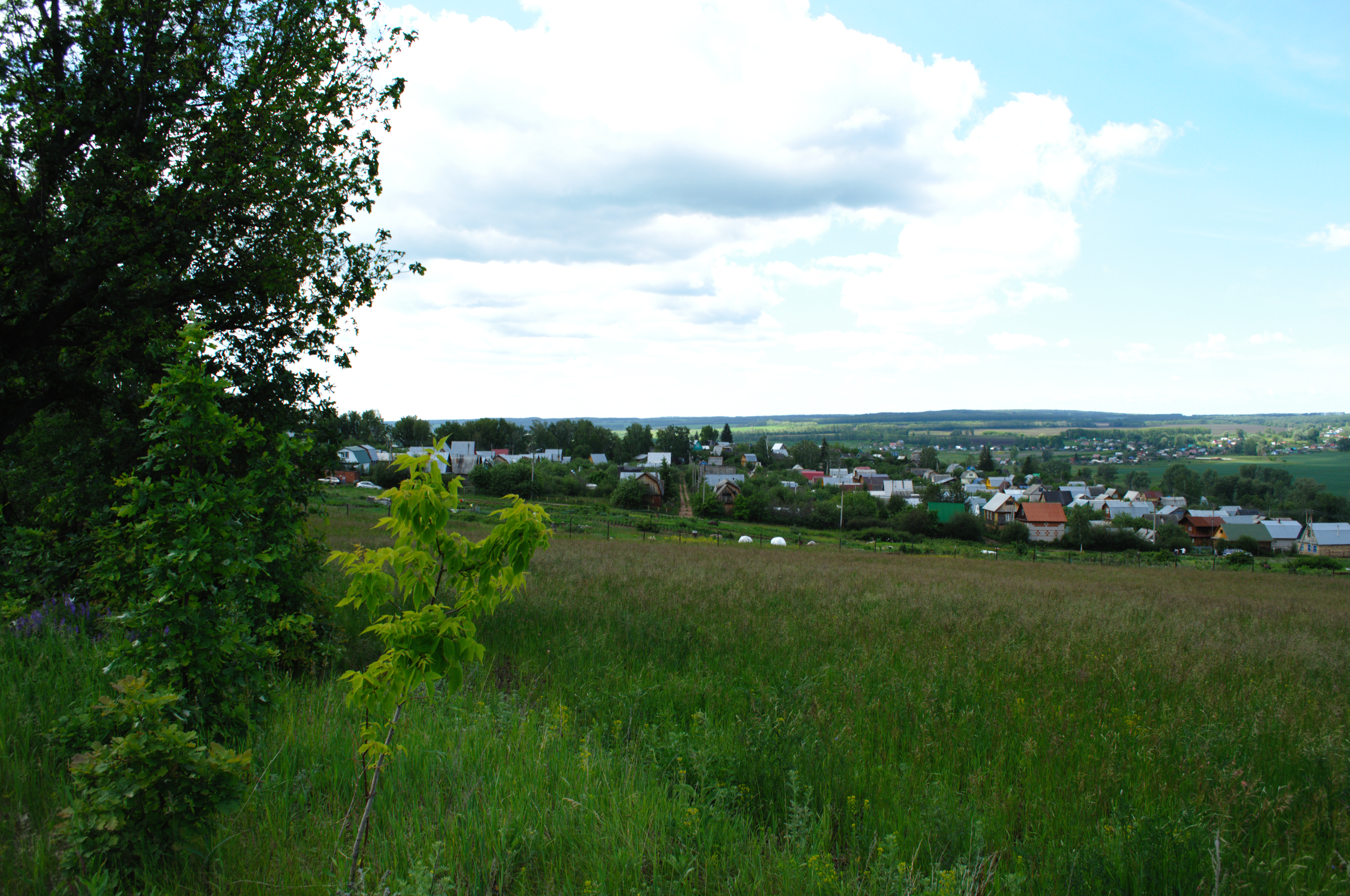

- Location within Bashkortostan Location within Russia
- Coordinates: 54°35′N 55°36′E
- Country: Russia
- Region: Bashkortostan
- District: Chishminsky District
- Time zone: UTC+5:00

Bochkaryovka (Russian: Бочкарёвка) is a rural locality (a village) in Alkinsky Selsoviet, Chishminsky District, Bashkortostan, Russia. The population was 50 as of 2010. There are 10 streets.

== Geography ==
Bochkaryovka is located 30 km east of Chishmy, the administrative centre of Chishminsky district. Pionerskaya is the nearest rural locality.
