= Sayranovo, Chishminsky District, Republic of Bashkortostan =

Sayranovo Сайраново
- Selo
- Location within Bashkortostan Location within Russia
- Coordinates: 54°30′N 55°37′E
- Country: Russia
- Region: Bashkortostan
- District: Chishminsky District
- Time zone: UTC+5:00

Sayranovo (Russian: Сайраново; Bashkir: Сайран, Sayran) is a rural locality (a selo) in Novotroitsky Selsoviet, Chishminsky District, Bashkortostan, Russia. The population was 379 as of 2010. There are 7 streets.

== Geography ==
Sayranovo is located 30 km southeast of Chishmy (the district's administrative centre) by road. Karan-Yelga is the nearest rural locality.
