= Medvedyorovo =

Medvedyorovo Медведёрово
- Selo
- Location within Bashkortostan Location within Russia
- Coordinates: 55°03′N 55°35′E
- Country: Russia
- Region: Bashkortostan
- District: Kushnarenkovsky District
- Time zone: UTC+5:00

Medvedyorovo (Russian: Медведёрово) is a rural locality (a selo) in Akhmetovsky Selsoviet, Kushnarenkovsky District, Bashkortostan, Russia. The population was 90 as of 2010. There are 3 streets.

== Geography ==
Medvedyorovo is located 24 km southeast of Kushnarenkovo (the district's administrative centre) by road. Kuvykovo is the nearest rural locality.
