= Yashikey =

Yashikey Яшикей
- Village
- Location within Bashkortostan Location within Russia
- Coordinates: 54°31′N 55°07′E
- Country: Russia
- Region: Bashkortostan
- District: Chishminsky District
- Time zone: UTC+5:00

Yashikey (Russian: Яшикей; Bashkir: Йәшекәй, Yäşekäy) is a rural locality (a village) in Safarovsky Selsoviet, Chishminsky District, Bashkortostan, Russia. The population was 8 as of 2010. There is 1 street.

== Geography ==
Yashikey is located 23 km southwest of Chishmy (the district's administrative centre) by road. Karamaly is the nearest rural locality.
