= Novobaskakovo =

Novobaskakovo Новобаскаково
- Village
- Location within Bashkortostan Location within Russia
- Coordinates: 54°51′N 55°24′E
- Country: Russia
- Region: Bashkortostan
- District: Kushnarenkovsky District
- Time zone: UTC+5:00

Novobaskakovo (Russian: Новобаскаково; Bashkir: Яңы Баҫҡаҡ, Yañı Baśqaq) is a rural locality (a village) in Starogumerovsky Selsoviet, Kushnarenkovsky District, Bashkortostan, Russia. The population was 7 as of 2010. There are 3 streets.

== Geography ==
Novobaskakovo is located 45 km south of Kushnarenkovo (the district's administrative centre) by road. Sultanayevo is the nearest rural locality.
