= Ilkashevo =

Ilkashevo Илькашево
- Selo
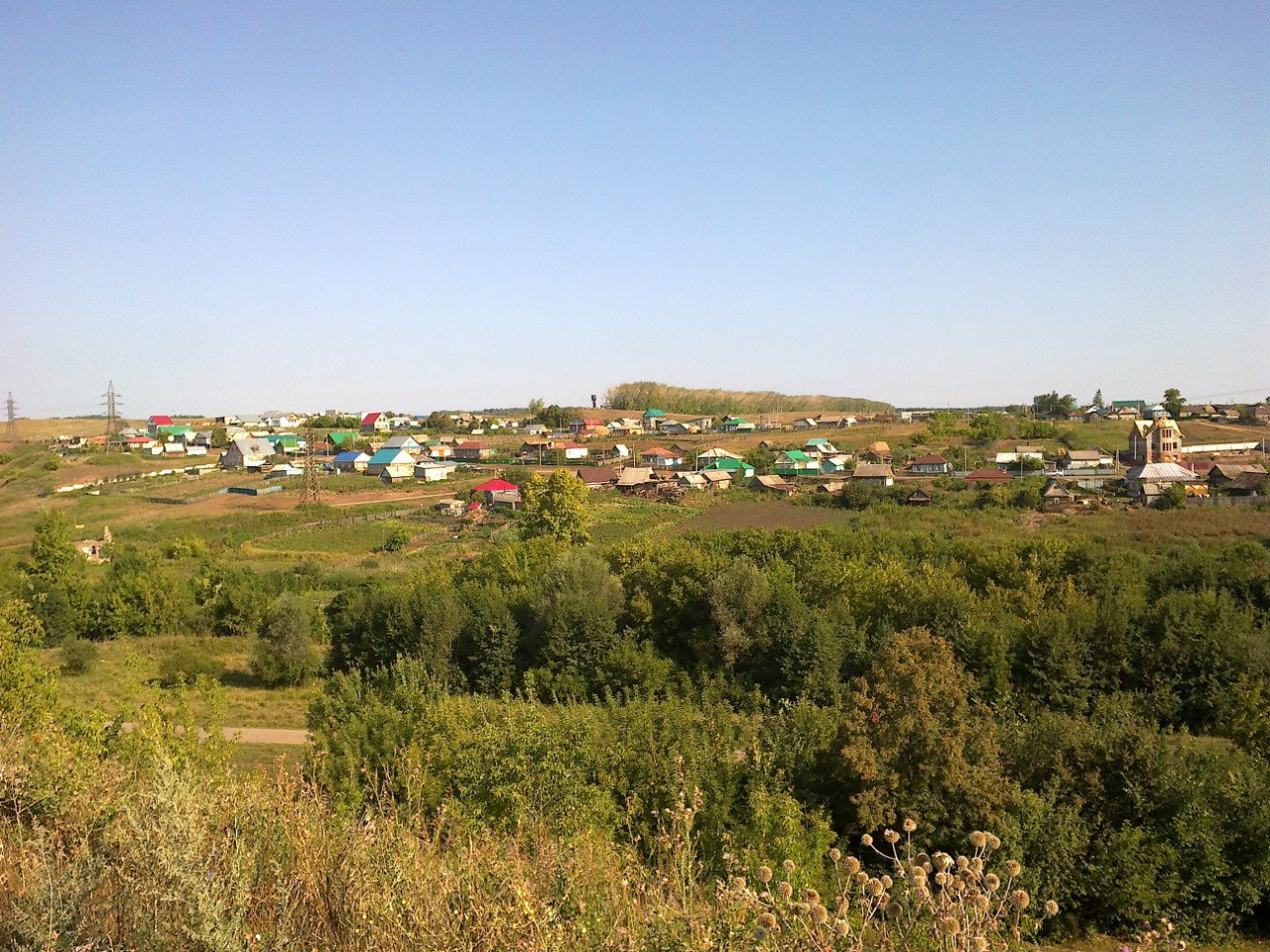
- View of the village of Ilkashevo from the railway area, bridge across the Kalmashka River, 2010.

- Location within Bashkortostan Location within Russia
- Coordinates: 54°36′N 55°26′E
- Country: Russia
- Region: Bashkortostan
- District: Chishminsky District
- Time zone: UTC+5:00

Ilkashevo (Russian: Илькашево; Bashkir: Илкәш, İlkäş) is a rural locality (a selo) in Alkinsky Selsoviet, Chishminsky District, Bashkortostan, Russia. The village has 4 streets and, as of 2010, a population of 210.

== Geography ==
Ilkashevo is located 5 km northeast of Chishmy, the district's administrative centre. Chishmy is the nearest rural locality.
