= Abrayevo =

Abrayevo Абраево Абрай
- Village
- Location within Bashkortostan Location within Russia
- Coordinates: 54°23′N 55°27′E
- Country: Russia
- Region: Bashkortostan
- District: Chishminsky District
- Time zone: [[UTC+5:00]]

Abrayevo (Russian: Абраево, Bashkir: Абрай, Abray) is a rural locality (a village) in Chuvalkipovsky Selsoviet of Chishminsky District, Bashkortostan, Russia. The population was 320 as of 2010. There are 5 streets.

== Geography ==
Abrayevo is located 37 km south of Chishmy, the administrative seat of the district. Staromusino is the nearest rural locality.

== Ethnicity ==
The village is inhabited by Tatars and others.
