= Shingak-Kul =

Shingak-Kul Шингак-Куль
- Selo
- Location within Bashkortostan Location within Russia
- Coordinates: 54°23′N 55°12′E
- Country: Russia
- Region: Bashkortostan
- District: Chishminsky District
- Time zone: UTC+5:00

Shingak-Kul (Russian: Шингак-Куль; Bashkir: Шөңгәккүл, Şöñgäkkül) is a rural locality (a selo) and the administrative centre of Shingak-Kulsky Selsoviet, Chishminsky District, Bashkortostan, Russia. The population was 2,975 as of 2010. There are 33 streets.

== Geography ==
Shingak-Kul is located 27 km southwest of Chishmy (the district's administrative centre) by road. Yabalakly is the nearest rural locality.
