= Sredneakbashevo =

Sredneakbashevo Среднеакбашево
- Village
- Location within Bashkortostan Location within Russia
- Coordinates: 54°57′N 55°32′E
- Country: Russia
- Region: Bashkortostan
- District: Kushnarenkovsky District
- Time zone: UTC+5:00

Sredneakbashevo (Russian: Среднеакбашево; Bashkir: Урта Аҡбаш, Urta Aqbaş) is a rural locality (a village) in Sharipovsky Selsoviet, Kushnarenkovsky District, Bashkortostan, Russia. The population was 175 as of 2010. There are 14 streets.

== Geography ==
Sredneakbashevo is located 26 km southeast of Kushnarenkovo (the district's administrative centre) by road. Nizhneakbashevo is the nearest rural locality.
