= Yeremeyevo =

Yeremeyevo Еремеево
- Selo
- Location within Bashkortostan Location within Russia
- Coordinates: 54°36′N 55°20′E
- Country: Russia
- Region: Bashkortostan
- District: Chishminsky District
- Time zone: UTC+5:00

Yeremeyevo (Russian: Еремеево; Bashkir: Йәрми, Yärmi) is a rural locality (a selo) and the administrative centre of Yeremeyevsky Selsoviet, Chishminsky District, Bashkortostan, Russia. The population was 543 as of 2010. There are 23 streets.

== Geography ==
Yeremeyevo is located 4 km northwest of Chishmy (the district's administrative centre) by road. Kavetka is the nearest rural locality.
