= Durasovo, Chishminsky District, Republic of Bashkortostan =

Durasovo Дурасово
- Selo
- Location within Bashkortostan Location within Russia
- Coordinates: 54°25′N 55°17′E
- Country: Russia
- Region: Bashkortostan
- District: Chishminsky District
- Time zone: UTC+5:00

Durasovo (Russian: Дурасово) is a rural locality (a selo) and the administrative centre of Durasovsky Selsoviet, Chishminsky District, Bashkortostan, Russia. The population was 368 as of 2010. There are 7 streets.

== Geography ==
Durasovo is located 23 km south of Chishmy, the administrative centre of the district. Verkhnekhozyaystvo is the nearest rural locality.
