= Tolbazy, Kushnarenkovsky District, Republic of Bashkortostan =

Tolbazy Толбазы
- Village
- Location within Bashkortostan Location within Russia
- Coordinates: 55°11′N 55°01′E
- Country: Russia
- Region: Bashkortostan
- District: Kushnarenkovsky District
- Time zone: UTC+5:00

Tolbazy (Russian: Толбазы; Bashkir: Талбаҙы, Talbaźı) is a rural locality (a village) in Karacha-Yelginsky Selsoviet, Kushnarenkovsky District, Bashkortostan, Russia. The population was 362 as of 2010. There are 4 streets.

== Geography ==
Tolbazy is located 28 km northwest of Kushnarenkovo (the district's administrative centre) by road. Staraya Murtaza is the nearest rural locality.
