= Durasovo, Vladimir Oblast =

Durasovo Дурасово
- Village
- Location within Vladimir Oblast Location within Russia
- Coordinates: 55°35′N 41°29′E
- Country: Russia
- Region: Vladimir Oblast
- District: Melenkovsky District
- Time zone: UTC+3:00

Durasovo (Russian: Дурасово) is a rural locality (a village) in Butylitskoye Rural Settlement, Melenkovsky District, Vladimir Oblast, Russia. The population was 5 as of 2010.

== Geography ==
Durasovo is located 36 km (22 mi) north of Melenki (the district's administrative centre) by road. Skripino is the nearest rural locality.
