= Durasovo, Sheksninsky District, Vologda Oblast =

Durasovo Дурасово
- Village
- Location within Vologda Oblast Location within Russia
- Coordinates: 59°09′N 38°15′E
- Country: Russia
- Region: Vologda Oblast
- District: Sheksninsky District
- Time zone: UTC+3:00

Durasovo (Russian: Дурасово) is a rural locality (a village) in Zheleznodorozhnoye Rural Settlement, Sheksninsky District, Vologda Oblast, Russia. The population was 8 as of 2002.

== Geography ==
Durasovo is located 20 km southwest of Sheksna (the district's administrative centre) by road. Maurino is the nearest rural locality.
