= Durasovo, Belebeyevsky District, Republic of Bashkortostan =

Durasovo Дурасово
- Village
- Location within Bashkortostan Location within Russia
- Coordinates: 54°04′N 53°53′E
- Country: Russia
- Region: Bashkortostan
- District: Belebeyevsky District
- Time zone: UTC+5:00

Durasovo (Russian: Дурасово) is a rural locality (a village) in Rassvetovsky Selsoviet, Belebeyevsky District, Bashkortostan, Russia. The population was 5 as of 2010. There is 1 street.

== Geography ==
Durasovo is located 19 km west of Belebey (the district's administrative centre) by road. Kirillovka is the nearest rural locality.
