= Kushnarenkovo =

Kushnarenkovo Кушнаренково
- Selo

Other transcription(s)
  - Bashkir: Кушнаренко
- Interactive map of Kushnarenkovo
- Location of Kushnarenkovo Kushnarenkovo (Bashkortostan)
- Coordinates: 55°06′18″N 55°20′52″E
- Country: Russia
- Federal subject: Bashkortostan
- Administrative district: Kushnarenkovsky District
- SelsovietSelsoviet: Kushnarenkovsky
- Founded: 1709

Population (2010 Census)
  - Total: 9,870
  - Estimate (2010): 9,870 (0%)

Administrative status
  - Capital of: Kushnarenkovsky District, Kushnarenkovsky Selsoviet

Municipal status
  - Municipal district: Kushnarenkovsky Municipal District
  - Rural settlement: Kushnarenkovsky Selsoviet Rural Settlement
  - Capital of: Kushnarenkovsky Municipal District, Kushnarenkovsky Selsoviet Rural Settlement
- Time zone: UTC+5 (MSK+2)
- Postal code: 452230
- OKTMO ID: 80640435101

Kushnarenkovo (Russian: Кушнаре́нково, Bashkir: Кушнаренко, romanized: Kuşnarenko) is a rural locality (a selo) and the administrative center of Kushnarenkovsky District of the Republic of Bashkortostan, Russia, located on the Belaya River. Population: 9,870 (2010 census); 10,630 (2002 census); 9,032 (1989 Soviet census). Since 1941 the International Lenin School worked here under a code name of an agricultural college.
