= Kushnarenkovsky District =

Kushnarenkovsky District Кушнаренковский район (Russian)
- District

Other transcription(s)
  - Bashkir: Кушнарен(ко) районы
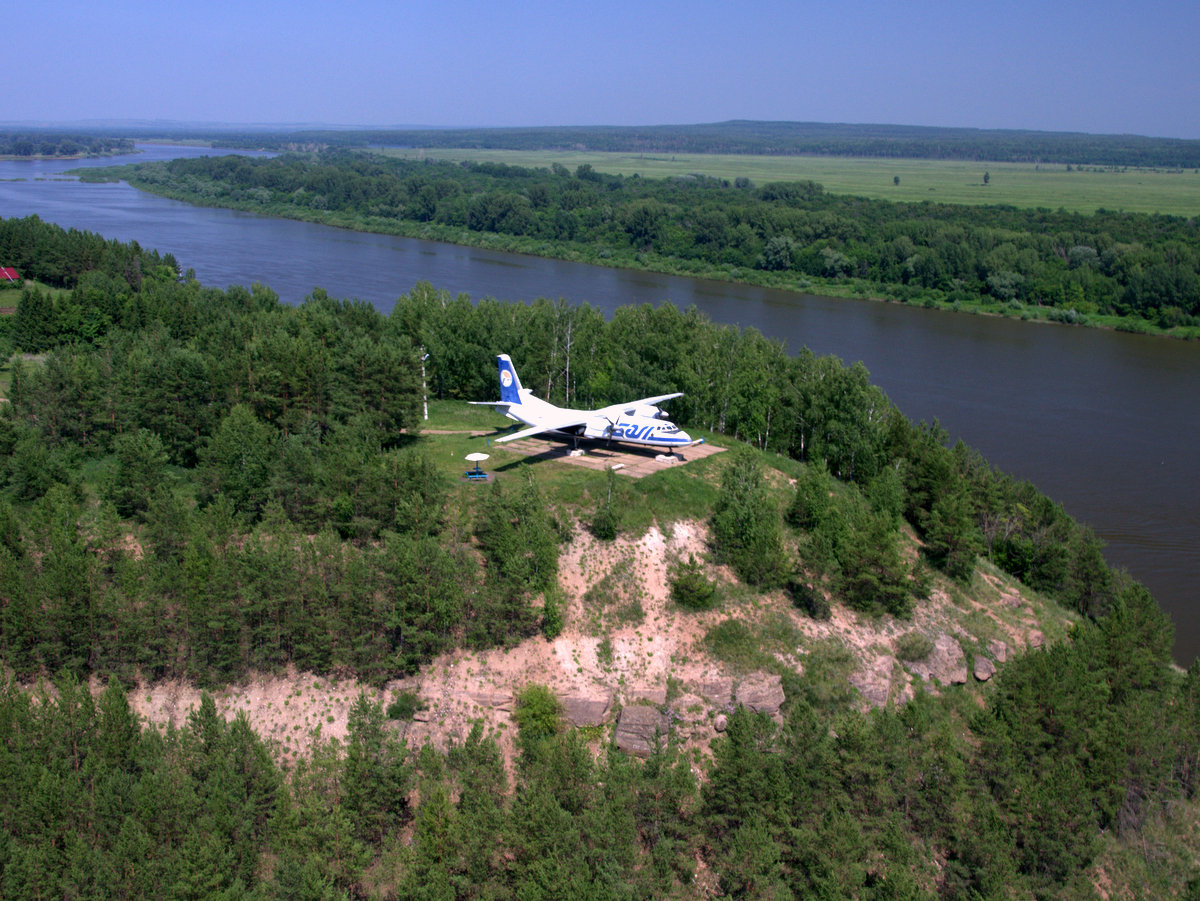
- BAL Bashkirian Airlines Antonov An-24B in Kushnarenkovo, Kushnarenkovsky District

- Flag Coat of arms
- Location of Kushnarenkovsky District in the Republic of Bashkortostan
- Coordinates: 55°06′N 55°21′E
- Country: Russia
- Federal subject: Republic of Bashkortostan
- Established: 1930
- Administrative center: Kushnarenkovo

Area
  - Total: 1,717.77 km^{2} (663.23 sq mi)

Population (2010 Census)
  - Total: 27,491
  - Estimate (2018): 26,767 (−2.6%)
  - Density: 16.004/km^{2} (41.450/sq mi)
  - Urban: 0%
  - Rural: 100%

Administrative structure
  - Administrative divisions: 12 Selsoviets
  - Inhabited localities: 69 rural localities

Municipal structure
  - Municipally incorporated as: Kushnarenkovsky Municipal District
  - Municipal divisions: 0 urban settlements, 12 rural settlements
- Time zone: UTC+5 (MSK+2)
- OKTMO ID: 80640000
- Website: https://kushnarenkovo.bashkortostan.ru/

Population of Kushnarenkovsky District
- 2010 Census: 27,491
- 2002 Census: 29,344
- 1989 Census: 28,236
- 1979 Census: 31,733

Kushnarenkovsky District (Russian: Кушнаре́нковский райо́н; Bashkir: Кушнарен районы or Кушнаренко районы, Kuşnaren(ko) rayonı) is an administrative and municipal district (raion), one of the fifty-four in the Republic of Bashkortostan, Russia. It is located in the northern central part of the republic and borders with Birsky District in the north, Blagoveshchensky District in the northeast and east, Ufimsky District in the east and southeast, Chishminsky District in the south, Blagovarsky District in the south and southwest, Chekmagushevsky District in the west, and with Dyurtyulinsky District in the northwest. The area of the district is 1,717.77 square kilometers (663.23 sq mi). Its administrative center is the rural locality (a selo) of Kushnarenkovo. As of the 2010 Census, the total population of the district was 27,491, with the population of Kushnarenkovo accounting for 35.9% of that number.

== History ==
The district was established in 1930.

== Administrative and municipal status ==
Within the framework of administrative divisions, Kushnarenkovsky District is one of the fifty-four in the Republic of Bashkortostan. The district is divided into twelve selsoviets, comprising sixty-nine rural localities. As a municipal division, the district is incorporated as Kushnarenkovsky Municipal District. Its twelve selsoviets are incorporated as twelve rural settlements within the municipal district. The selo of Kushnarenkovo serves as the administrative center of both the administrative and municipal district.
