= Chishmy =

Chishmy Чишмы
- Work settlement

Other transcription(s)
  - Bashkir: Шишмә; Şişmä
- Interactive map of Chishmy
- Location of Chishmy Chishmy (Bashkortostan)
- Coordinates: 54°35′38″N 54°23′42″E
- Country: Russia
- Federal subject: Bashkortostan
- Administrative district: Chishminsky District
- Settlement CouncilSelsoviet: Chishminsky Settlement Council
- Founded: 1650
- Elevation: 120 m (390 ft)

Population (2010 Census)
  - Total: 21,196
  - Estimate (1 January 2019): 22,733 (+7.3%)

Administrative status
  - Capital of: Chishminsky District, Chishminsky Settlement Council

Municipal status
  - Municipal district: Chishminsky Municipal District
  - Urban settlement: Chishminsky Urban Settlement
  - Capital of: Chishminsky Municipal District, Chishminsky Urban Settlement
- Time zone: UTC+5 (MSK+2)
- Postal codes: 452170–452175, 452179
- OKTMO ID: 80657151051
- Website: chishmy.info

Chishmy population
- 2010 Census: 21,196
- 2002 Census: 21,008
- 1989 Census: 18,982
- 1979 Census: 14,283

Chishmy (Russian: Чишмы́; Bashkir: Шишмә, Şişmä) is an urban locality (a work settlement) and the administrative center of Chishminsky District in the Republic of Bashkortostan, Russia, located near the Dyoma River. At the 2010 Census, its population was 21,196.

== Administrative and municipal status ==
Within the framework of administrative divisions, the urban locality of Chishmy serves as the administrative center of Chishminsky District. As an administrative division, it is incorporated within Chishminsky District as Chishminsky Settlement Council. As a municipal division, Chishminsky Settlement Council is incorporated within Chishminsky Municipal District as Chishminsky Urban Settlement.
