= Chishminsky District =

Chishminsky District Чишминский район (Russian)
- District

Other transcription(s)
  - Bashkir: Шишмә районы
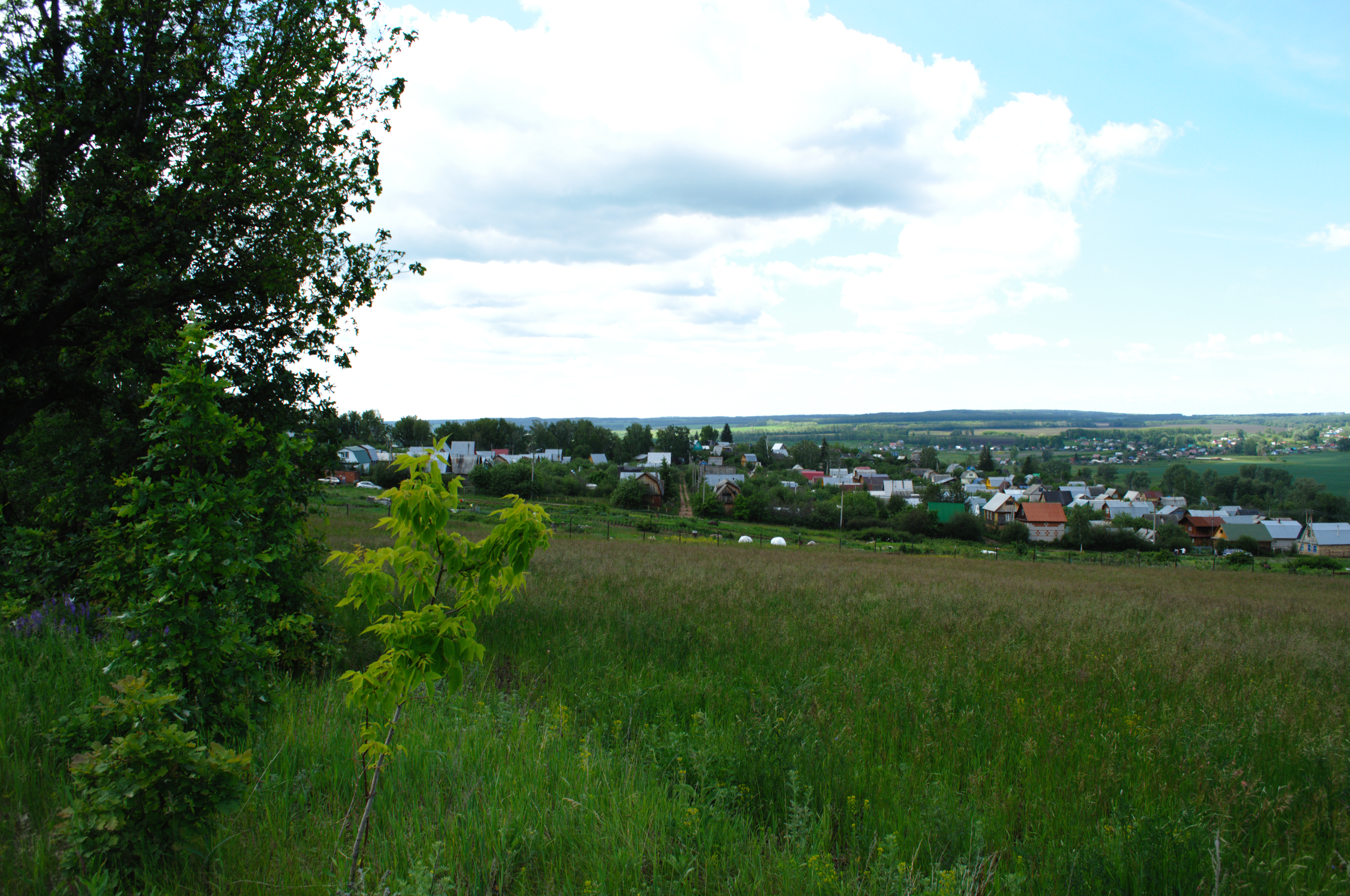
- Near Pionerskaya railway station, Chishminsky District

- Flag Coat of arms
- Location of Chishminsky District in the Republic of Bashkortostan
- Coordinates: 54°36′N 55°24′E
- Country: Russia
- Federal subject: Republic of Bashkortostan
- Established: 1930
- Administrative center: Chishmy

Area
  - Total: 1,823.77 km^{2} (704.16 sq mi)

Population (2010 Census)
  - Total: 52,344
  - Estimate (2018): 54,179 (+3.5%)
  - Density: 28.701/km^{2} (74.335/sq mi)
  - Urban: 40.5%
  - Rural: 59.5%

Administrative structure
  - Administrative divisions: 1 Settlement councils, 15 Selsoviets
  - Inhabited localities: 1 urban-type settlements, 103 rural localities

Municipal structure
  - Municipally incorporated as: Chishminsky Municipal District
  - Municipal divisions: 1 urban settlements, 15 rural settlements
- Time zone: UTC+5 (MSK+2)
- OKTMO ID: 80657000
- Website: chishmy.bashkortostan.ru

Population of Chishminsky District
- 2010 Census: 52,344
- 2002 Census: 52,663
- 1989 Census: 45,660
- 1979 Census: 47,939

Chishminsky District (Russian: Чишми́нский райо́н; Bashkir: Шишмә районы, Şişmä rayonı) is an administrative with some beautiful sites and municipal district (raion), one of the fifty-four in the Republic of Bashkortostan, Russia. It is located in the center of the republic and borders Kushnarenkovsky District in the north, Ufimsky District in the northeast and east, Karmaskalinsky District in the southeast, Davlekanovsky District in the south, and Blagovarsky District in the west and northwest. The area of the district is 1,823.77 square kilometers (704.16 sq mi). Its administrative center is the urban locality (a work settlement) of Chishmy. As of the 2010 Census, the total population of the district was 52,344, with the population of the administrative center accounting for 40.5% of that number.

== History ==
The district was established in 1930.

== Administrative and municipal status ==
Within the framework of administrative divisions, Chishminsky District is one of the fifty-four in the Republic of Bashkortostan. It is divided into 1 settlement council (with the administrative center in the work settlement of Chishmy) and 15 selsoviets, which comprise 103 rural localities. As a municipal division, the district is incorporated as Chishminsky Municipal District. The settlement council is incorporated as an urban settlement, and the fifteen selsoviets are incorporated as fifteen rural settlements within the municipal district. The work settlement of Chishmy serves as the administrative center of both the administrative and municipal district.
