= Tyubeteyevo =

Tyubeteyevo Тюбетеево
- Village
- Location within Bashkortostan Location within Russia
- Coordinates: 53°53′N 55°01′E
- Country: Russia
- Region: Bashkortostan
- District: Alsheyevsky District
- Time zone: UTC+5:00

Tyubeteyevo (Russian: Тюбетеево; Bashkir: Тәүәтәй, Täwätäy) is a rural locality (a village) in Chebenlinsky Selsoviet, Alsheyevsky District, Bashkortostan, Russia. The population was 287 as of 2010. There are 2 streets.

== Geography ==
Tyubeteyevo is located 28 km south of Rayevsky (the district's administrative centre) by road. Chebenli is the nearest rural locality.
