= Fan, Bashkortostan =

Fan Фань
- Village
- Location within Bashkortostan Location within Russia
- Coordinates: 54°08′N 54°45′E
- Country: Russia
- Region: Bashkortostan
- District: Alsheyevsky District
- Time zone: UTC+5:00

Fan (Russian: Фань; Bashkir: Фән, Fän) is a rural locality (a village) in Kazansky Selsoviet, Alsheyevsky District, Bashkortostan, Russia. The population was 108 as of 2010. There are 2 streets.

== Geography ==
Fan is located 18 km northwest of Rayevsky (the district's administrative centre) by road. Kazanka is the nearest rural locality.
