= Churakayevo =

Churakayevo Чуракаево
- Selo
- Location within Bashkortostan Location within Russia
- Coordinates: 54°00′N 54°46′E
- Country: Russia
- Region: Bashkortostan
- District: Alsheyevsky District
- Time zone: UTC+5:00

Churakayevo (Russian: Чуракаево; Bashkir: Сураҡай, Suraqay) is a rural locality (a selo) in Shafranovsky Selsoviet, Alsheyevsky District, Bashkortostan, Russia. The population was 477 as of 2010. There are 4 streets.

== Geography ==
Churakayevo is located 17 km southwest of Rayevsky (the district's administrative centre) by road. Shafranovo is the nearest rural locality.
