= Aleksandrovka, Alsheyevsky District, Republic of Bashkortostan =

Aleksandrovka Александровка
- Village
- Location within Bashkortostan Location within Russia
- Coordinates: 53°48′N 54°38′E
- Country: Russia
- Region: Bashkortostan
- District: Alsheyevsky District
- Time zone: UTC+5:00

Aleksandrovka (Russian: Александровка) is a rural locality (a village) in Nikifarovsky Selsoviet, Alsheyevsky District, Bashkortostan, Russia. The population was 21 as of 2010. There is 1 street.

== Geography ==
Aleksandrovka is located 49 km southwest of Rayevsky (the district's administrative centre) by road. Gayniyamak is the nearest rural locality.
