= Yarabaykul =

Yarabaykul Ярабайкуль
- Village
- Location within Bashkortostan Location within Russia
- Coordinates: 53°57′N 54°32′E
- Country: Russia
- Region: Bashkortostan
- District: Alsheyevsky District
- Time zone: UTC+5:00

Yarabaykul (Russian: Ярабайкуль; Bashkir: Ярабайкүл, Yarabaykül) is a rural locality (a village) in Aksyonovsky Selsoviet, Alsheyevsky District, Bashkortostan, Russia. The population was 15 as of 2010. There is 1 street.

== Geography ==
Yarabaykul is located 36 km southwest of Rayevsky (the district's administrative centre) by road. Chubukaran is the nearest rural locality.
