= Igenche =

Igenche Игенче
- Village
- Location within Bashkortostan Location within Russia
- Coordinates: 54°01′N 55°17′E
- Country: Russia
- Region: Bashkortostan
- District: Alsheyevsky District
- Time zone: UTC+5:00

Igenche (Russian: Игенче; Bashkir: Игенсе, İgense) is a rural locality (a village) in Abdrashitovsky Selsoviet, Alsheyevsky District, Bashkortostan, Russia. The population was 56 as of 2010. There are 2 streets.

== Geography ==
Igenche is located 30 km southeast of Rayevsky (the district's administrative centre) by road. Krasnaya Zvezda is the nearest rural locality.
