= Sartbash =

Sartbash Сартбаш
- Village
- Location within Bashkortostan Location within Russia
- Coordinates: 54°01′N 55°18′E
- Country: Russia
- Region: Bashkortostan
- District: Alsheyevsky District
- Time zone: UTC+5:00

Sartbash (Russian: Сартбаш; Bashkir: Һартбаш, Hartbaş) is a rural locality (a village) in Abdrashitovsky Selsoviet, Alsheyevsky District, Bashkortostan, Russia. The population was 2 as of 2010. There is 1 street.

== Geography ==
Sartbash is located 29 km east of Rayevsky (the district's administrative centre) by road. Krasnaya Zvezda is the nearest rural locality.
