= Ibrayevo =

Ibrayevo Ибраево
- Village
- Location within Bashkortostan Location within Russia
- Coordinates: 54°06′N 55°04′E
- Country: Russia
- Region: Bashkortostan
- District: Alsheyevsky District
- Time zone: UTC+5:00

Ibrayevo (Russian: Ибраево; Bashkir: Ибрай, İbray) is a rural locality (a village) in Ibrayevsky Selsoviet, Alsheyevsky District, Bashkortostan, Russia. The population was 241 as of 2010. There are 2 streets.

== Geography ==
Ibrayevo is located 15 km northeast of Rayevsky (the district's administrative centre) by road. Dyurtyuli is the nearest rural locality.
