= Mendyanovo =

Mendyanovo Мендяново
- Selo
- Location within Bashkortostan Location within Russia
- Coordinates: 53°54′N 54°46′E
- Country: Russia
- Region: Bashkortostan
- District: Alsheyevsky District
- Time zone: UTC+5:00

Mendyanovo (Russian: Мендяново; Bashkir: Мәндән, Mändän) is a rural locality (a selo) and the administrative center of Mendyanovsky Selsoviet, Alsheyevsky District, Bashkortostan, Russia. The population was 412 as of 2010. There are 4 streets.

== Geography ==
Mendyanovo is located 30 km southwest of Rayevsky (the district's administrative centre) by road. Staraya Vasilyevka is the nearest rural locality.
