= Kipchak-Askarovo =

Kipchak-Askarovo Кипчак-Аскарово
- Selo
- Location within Bashkortostan Location within Russia
- Coordinates: 53°56′N 55°03′E
- Country: Russia
- Region: Bashkortostan
- District: Alsheyevsky District
- Time zone: UTC+5:00

Kipchak-Askarovo (Russian: Кипчак-Аскарово; Bashkir: Ҡыпсаҡ-Асҡар, Qıpsaq-Asqar) is a rural locality (a selo) and the administrative center of Kipchak-Askarovsky Selsoviet, Alsheyevsky District, Bashkortostan, Russia. The population was 656 as of 2010. There are 7 streets.

== Geography ==
Kipchak-Askarovo is located 22 km south of Rayevsky (the district's administrative centre) by road. Saryshevo is the nearest rural locality.
