= Belyakovka, Republic of Bashkortostan =

Belyakovka Беляковка
- Village
- Location within Bashkortostan Location within Russia
- Coordinates: 53°57′N 55°27′E
- Country: Russia
- Region: Bashkortostan
- District: Alsheyevsky District
- Time zone: UTC+5:00

Belyakovka (Russian: Беляковка) is a rural locality (a village) in Nigmatullinsky Selsoviet, Alsheyevsky District, Bashkortostan, Russia. The population was 14 as of 2010. There is 1 street.

== Geography ==
Belyakovka is located 50 km southeast of Rayevsky (the district's administrative centre) by road. Neforoshchanka is the nearest rural locality.
