= Kayrakly =

Kayrakly Кайраклы
- Selo
- Location within Bashkortostan Location within Russia
- Coordinates: 53°56′N 54°30′E
- Country: Russia
- Region: Bashkortostan
- District: Alsheyevsky District
- Time zone: UTC+5:00

Kayrakly (Russian: Кайраклы; Bashkir: Ҡайраҡлы, Qayraqlı) is a rural locality (a selo) in Aksyonovsky Selsoviet, Alsheyevsky District, Bashkortostan, Russia. The population was 186 as of 2010. There are 5 streets.

== Geography ==
Kayrakly is located 41 km southwest of Rayevsky (the district's administrative centre) by road. Yarabaykul is the nearest rural locality.
