= Bikchagul =

Bikchagul Бикчагул
- Village
- Location within Bashkortostan Location within Russia
- Coordinates: 53°56′N 54°37′E
- Country: Russia
- Region: Bashkortostan
- District: Alsheyevsky District
- Time zone: UTC+5:00

Bikchagul (Russian: Бикчагул; Bashkir: Биксағыл, Biksağıl) is a rural locality (a village) in Aksyonovsky Selsoviet, Alsheyevsky District, Bashkortostan, Russia. The population was 114 as of 2010. There are 2 streets.

== Geography ==
Bikchagul is located 29 km southwest of Rayevsky (the district's administrative centre) by road. Khanzharovo is the nearest rural locality.
