= Osorgino =

Osorgino Осоргино
- Village
- Location within Bashkortostan Location within Russia
- Coordinates: 53°53′N 54°30′E
- Country: Russia
- Region: Bashkortostan
- District: Alsheyevsky District
- Time zone: UTC+5:00

Osorgino (Russian: Осоргино; Bashkir: Осоргин, Osorgin) is a rural locality (a village) in Vozdvizhensky Selsoviet, Alsheyevsky District, Bashkortostan, Russia. The population was 33 as of 2010. There is 1 street.

== Geography ==
Osorgino is located 40 km southwest of Rayevsky (the district's administrative centre) by road. Chelnokovka is the nearest rural locality.
