= Murzagulovo =

Murzagulovo Мурзагулово
- Village
- Location within Bashkortostan Location within Russia
- Coordinates: 53°44′N 55°21′E
- Country: Russia
- Region: Bashkortostan
- District: Alsheyevsky District
- Time zone: UTC+5:00

Murzagulovo (Russian: Мурзагулово; Bashkir: Мырҙағол, Mırźağol) is a rural locality (a village) in Kysylsky Selsoviet, Alsheyevsky District, Bashkortostan, Russia. The population was 85 as of 2010. There are 4 streets.

== Geography ==
Murzagulovo is located 61 km southeast of Rayevsky (the district's administrative centre) by road. Konstantinogradovka is the nearest rural locality.
