= Nikifarovo =

Nikifarovo Никифарово
- Selo
- Location within Bashkortostan Location within Russia
- Coordinates: 53°49′N 54°41′E
- Country: Russia
- Region: Bashkortostan
- District: Alsheyevsky District
- Time zone: UTC+5:00

Nikifarovo (Russian: Никифарово; Bashkir: Никифар, Nikifar) is a rural locality (a selo) and the administrative center of Nikifarovsky Selsoviet, Alsheyevsky District, Bashkortostan, Russia. The population was 845 as of 2010. There are eight streets.

== Geography ==
Nikifarovo is located 46 km southwest of Rayevsky (the district's administrative centre) by road. Gayniyamak is the nearest rural locality.
