= Kunkas =

Kunkas Кункас
- Village
- Location within Bashkortostan Location within Russia
- Coordinates: 53°49′N 54°57′E
- Country: Russia
- Region: Bashkortostan
- District: Alsheyevsky District
- Time zone: UTC+5:00

Kunkas (Russian: Кункас; Bashkir: Ҡунҡаҫ, Qunqaś) is a rural locality (a village) in Chebenlinsky Selsoviet, Alsheyevsky District, Bashkortostan, Russia. The population was 31 as of 2010. There is 1 street.

== Geography ==
Kunkas is located 39 km south of Rayevsky (the district's administrative centre) by road. Ilchigulovo is the nearest rural locality.
