= Aytugan =

Aytugan Айтуган
- Village
- Location within Bashkortostan Location within Russia
- Coordinates: 53°46′N 54°37′E
- Country: Russia
- Region: Bashkortostan
- District: Alsheyevsky District
- Time zone: UTC+5:00

Aytugan (Russian: Айтуган; Bashkir: Айтуған, Aytuğan) is a rural locality (a village) in Gayniyamaksky Selsoviet, Alsheyevsky District, Bashkortostan, Russia. The population was 16 as of 2010. There is 1 street.

== Geography ==
Aytugan is located 58 km southwest of Rayevsky (the district's administrative centre) by road. Malye Gayny is the nearest rural locality.
