= Gayniyamak =

Gayniyamak Гайниямак
- Selo
- Location within Bashkortostan Location within Russia
- Coordinates: 53°47′N 54°36′E
- Country: Russia
- Region: Bashkortostan
- District: Alsheyevsky District

Area
  - Total: 2.56 km^{2} (0.99 sq mi)
- Time zone: UTC+5:00

Gayniyamak (Russian: Гайниямак; Bashkir: Гәйнәямаҡ, Gäynäyamaq) is a rural locality (a selo) and the administrative center of Gayniyamaksky Selsoviet, Alsheyevsky District, Bashkortostan, Russia. The population was 897 as of 2010. There are 14 streets.

== Geography ==
Gayniyamak is located 52 km southwest of Rayevsky (the district's administrative centre) by road. Alexandrovka is the nearest rural locality.
