= Kolonka, Republic of Bashkortostan =

Kolonka Колонка
- Village
- Location within Bashkortostan Location within Russia
- Coordinates: 54°03′N 54°41′E
- Country: Russia
- Region: Bashkortostan
- District: Alsheyevsky District
- Time zone: UTC+5:00

Kolonka (Russian: Колонка) is a rural locality (a village) in Shafranovsky Selsoviet, Alsheyevsky District, Bashkortostan, Russia. The population was 3 as of 2010. There is 1 street.

== Geography ==
Kolonka is located 26 km west of Rayevsky (the district's administrative centre) by road. Karan is the nearest rural locality.
