= Klinovka, Republic of Bashkortostan =

Klinovka Клиновка
- Village
- Location within Bashkortostan Location within Russia
- Coordinates: 53°54′N 54°25′E
- Country: Russia
- Region: Bashkortostan
- District: Alsheyevsky District
- Time zone: UTC+5:00

Klinovka (Russian: Клиновка) is a rural locality (a village) in Vozdvizhensky Selsoviet, Alsheyevsky District, Bashkortostan, Russia. The population was 1 as of 2010. There is 1 street.

== Geography ==
Klinovka is located 47 km southwest of Rayevsky (the district's administrative centre) by road. Novovozdvizhenka is the nearest rural locality.
