= Chelnokovka =

Chelnokovka Челноковка
- Village
- Location within Bashkortostan Location within Russia
- Coordinates: 53°53′N 54°31′E
- Country: Russia
- Region: Bashkortostan
- District: Alsheyevsky District
- Time zone: UTC+5:00

Chelnokovka (Russian: Челноковка) is a rural locality (a village) in Vozdvizhensky Selsoviet, Alsheyevsky District, Bashkortostan, Russia. The population was 67 as of 2010. There are 3 streets.

== Geography ==
Chelnokovka is located 39 km southwest of Rayevsky (the district's administrative centre) by road. Osorgino is the nearest rural locality.
