= Kyzyl Yul =

Kyzyl Yul Кызыл Юл
- Village
- Location within Bashkortostan Location within Russia
- Coordinates: 53°51′N 54°55′E
- Country: Russia
- Region: Bashkortostan
- District: Alsheyevsky District

Population (2010)
  - Total: 50
- Time zone: UTC+5:00

Kyzyl Yul (Russian: Кызыл Юл; Bashkir: Ҡыҙыл Юл, Qıźıl Yul) is a rural locality (a village) in Chebenlinsky Selsoviet, Alsheyevsky District, Bashkortostan, Russia. The population was 50 as of 2010. There are 2 streets.

== Geography ==
Kyzyl Yul is located 36 km south of Rayevsky (the district's administrative centre) by road. Kamenka is the nearest rural locality.
