= Avryuztamak =

Avryuztamak Аврюзтамак
- Village
- Location within Bashkortostan Location within Russia
- Coordinates: 53°56′N 54°56′E
- Country: Russia
- Region: Bashkortostan
- District: Alsheyevsky District
- Time zone: UTC+5:00

Avryuztamak (Russian: Аврюзтамак; Bashkir: Әүрезтамаҡ, Äwreztamaq) is a rural locality (a village) in Nizhneavryuzovsky Selsoviet, Alsheyevsky District, Bashkortostan, Russia. The population was 68 as of 2010.

== Geography ==
Avryuztamak is located 21 km south of Rayevsky (the district's administrative centre) by road. Dim is the nearest rural locality.
