= Khusain =

Khusain Хусаин
- Village
- Location within Bashkortostan Location within Russia
- Coordinates: 53°59′N 54°54′E
- Country: Russia
- Region: Bashkortostan
- District: Alsheyevsky District
- Time zone: UTC+5:00

Khusain (Russian: Хусаин; Bashkir: Хөсәйен, Xösäyen) is a rural locality (a village) in Karmyshevsky Selsoviet, Alsheyevsky District, Bashkortostan, Russia. The population was 8 as of 2010. There is 1 street.

== Geography ==
Khusain is located 12 km south of Rayevsky (the district's administrative centre) by road. Slak is the nearest rural locality.
