= Saryshevo =

Saryshevo Сарышево
- Village
- Location within Bashkortostan Location within Russia
- Coordinates: 53°54′N 55°02′E
- Country: Russia
- Region: Bashkortostan
- District: Alsheyevsky District
- Time zone: UTC+5:00

Saryshevo (Russian: Сарышево; Bashkir: Һарыш, Harış) is a rural locality (a village) in Chebenlinsky Selsoviet, Alsheyevsky District, Bashkortostan, Russia. As of the 2010 census, its population was 180. The village contains 3 streets.

== Geography ==
Saryshevo is located 25 km south of Rayevsky (the district's administrative centre), by road. Tyubeteyevo is the nearest rural locality.
