= Stepanovka, Alsheyevsky District, Republic of Bashkortostan =

Stepanovka Степановка
- Village
- Location within Bashkortostan Location within Russia
- Coordinates: 53°50′N 54°32′E
- Country: Russia
- Region: Bashkortostan
- District: Alsheyevsky District

Area
  - Total: 0.13 km^{2} (0.050 sq mi)

Population (2010)
  - Total: 34
  - Density: 260/km^{2} (680/sq mi)
- Time zone: UTC+5:00

Stepanovka (Russian: Степановка) is a rural locality (a village) in Vozdvizhensky Selsoviet, Alsheyevsky District, Bashkortostan, Russia. The population was 34 as of 2010. There are two streets.

== Geography ==
Stepanovka is located 44 km southwest of Rayevsky (the district's administrative centre) by road. Sanatoriya imeni Chekhova is the nearest rural locality. It has an area of 0.13 km2.
