= Novyye Balgazy =

Novyye Balgazy Новые Балгазы
- Village
- Location within Bashkortostan Location within Russia
- Coordinates: 53°50′N 54°50′E
- Country: Russia
- Region: Bashkortostan
- District: Alsheyevsky District
- Time zone: UTC+5:00

Novyye Balgazy (Russian: Новые Балгазы; Bashkir: Яңы Балғажы, Yañı Balğajı) is a rural locality (a village) in Nikifarovsky Selsoviet, Alsheyevsky District, Bashkortostan, Russia. The population was 28 as of 2010. There is one street.

== Geography ==
Novyye Balgazy is located 57 km southwest of Rayevsky (the district's administrative centre) by road. Balgazy is the nearest rural locality.
