= Zelyony Klin =

Zelyony Klin Зелёный Клин
- Village
- Location within Bashkortostan Location within Russia
- Coordinates: 53°49′N 55°08′E
- Country: Russia
- Region: Bashkortostan
- District: Alsheyevsky District
- Time zone: UTC+5:00

Zelyony Klin (Russian: Зелёный Клин) is a rural locality (a village) and the administrative center of Zelenoklinovsky Selsoviet, Alsheyevsky District, Bashkortostan, Russia. The population was 378 as of 2010. There are 7 streets.

== Geography ==
Zelyony Klin is located 41 km southeast of Rayevsky (the district's administrative centre) by road. Novokonstantinovka is the nearest rural locality.
