= Grigoryevka, Alsheyevsky District, Republic of Bashkortostan =

Grigoryevka Григорьевка
- Village
- Location within Bashkortostan Location within Russia
- Coordinates: 53°58′N 54°51′E
- Country: Russia
- Region: Bashkortostan
- District: Alsheyevsky District
- Time zone: UTC+5:00

Grigoryevka (Russian: Григорьевка) is a rural locality (a village) in Karmyshevsky Selsoviet, Alsheyevsky District, Bashkortostan, Russia. The population was 22 as of 2010. There is one street.

== Geography ==
Grigoryevka is located 13 km southwest of Rayevsky (the district's administrative centre) by road. Mikhaylovka is the nearest rural locality.
