= Starosepyashevo =

Starosepyashevo Старосепяшево
- Village
- Location within Bashkortostan Location within Russia
- Coordinates: 54°04′N 54°58′E
- Country: Russia
- Region: Bashkortostan
- District: Alsheyevsky District
- Time zone: UTC+5:00

Starosepyashevo (Russian: Старосепяшево; Bashkir: Иҫке Сәпәш, İśke Säpäş) is a rural locality (a village) in Ibrayevsky Selsoviet, Alsheyevsky District, Bashkortostan, Russia. The population was 133 as of 2010. There are 3 streets.

== Geography ==
Starosepyashevo is located 5 km east of Rayevsky (the district's administrative centre) by road. Rayevsky is the nearest rural locality.
