= Urazmetovo =

Urazmetovo Уразметово
- Selo
- Location within Bashkortostan Location within Russia
- Coordinates: 53°49′N 55°24′E
- Country: Russia
- Region: Bashkortostan
- District: Alsheyevsky District
- Time zone: UTC+5:00

Urazmetovo (Russian: Уразметово; Bashkir: Үрәҙмәт, Üräźmät) is a rural locality (a selo) in Kysylsky Selsoviet, Alsheyevsky District, Bashkortostan, Russia. The population was 227 as of 2010. There are 6 streets.

== Geography ==
Urazmetovo is located 50 km southeast of Rayevsky (the district's administrative centre) by road. Fedoro-Petrovka is the nearest rural locality.
