= Abdrashitovo, Alsheyevsky District, Bashkortostan =

Abdrashitovo Абдрашитово Әбдрәшит Äbdräşit
- Selo
- Location within Bashkortostan Location within Russia
- Coordinates: 54°00′N 55°11′E
- Country: Russia
- Region: Bashkortostan
- District: Alsheyevsky District
- Time zone: [[UTC+5:00]]

Abdrashitovo (Russian: Абдрашитово; Bashkir: Әбдрәшит, Äbdräşit) is a rural locality (a selo) in Abdrashitovsky Selsoviet, Alsheyevsky District, Bashkortostan, Russia. The population was 619 as of 2010. There are 8 streets.

== Geography ==
Abdrashitovo is located 27 km east of Rayevsky (the district's administrative centre) by road. Maloabdrashitovo is the nearest rural locality.

== Ethnicity ==
The village is inhabited by Bashkirs and others.
