= Tavrichanka, Alsheyevsky District, Republic of Bashkortostan =

Tavrichanka Тавричанка
- Selo
- Location within Bashkortostan Location within Russia
- Coordinates: 53°47′N 55°14′E
- Country: Russia
- Region: Bashkortostan
- District: Alsheyevsky District
- Time zone: UTC+5:00

Tavrichanka (Russian: Тавричанка) is a rural locality (a selo) and the administrative center of Kysylsky Selsoviet, Alsheyevsky District, Bashkortostan, Russia. The population was 635 as of 2010. There are 6 streets.

== Geography ==
Tavrichanka is located 48 km southeast of Rayevsky (the district's administrative centre) by road. Sulpan is the nearest rural locality.
