= Chaykino =

Chaykino Чайкино
- Khutor
- Location within Bashkortostan Location within Russia
- Coordinates: 53°58′N 54°49′E
- Country: Russia
- Region: Bashkortostan
- District: Alsheyevsky District
- Time zone: UTC+5:00

Chaykino (Russian: Чайкино; Bashkir: Чайкин, Çaykin) is a rural locality (a khutor) in Shafranovsky Selsoviet, Alsheyevsky District, Bashkortostan, Russia. The population was 163 as of 2010. There are 3 streets.

== Geography ==
Chaykino is located 23 km southwest of Rayevsky (the district's administrative centre) by road. Shafranovo is the nearest rural locality.
