= Balkan, Republic of Bashkortostan =

Balkan Балкан
- Village
- Location within Bashkortostan Location within Russia
- Coordinates: 53°58′N 55°16′E
- Country: Russia
- Region: Bashkortostan
- District: Alsheyevsky District
- Time zone: UTC+5:00

Balkan (Russian: Балкан; Bashkir: Балҡан, Balqan) is a rural locality (a village) in Abdrashitovsky Selsoviet, Alsheyevsky District, Bashkortostan, Russia. The population was 28 as of 2010. There is 1 street.

== Geography ==
Balkan is located 40 km southeast of Rayevsky (the district's administrative centre) by road. Nikolayevka is the nearest rural locality.
