= Verkhneye Avryuzovo =

Verkhneye Avryuzovo Верхнее Аврюзово
- Village
- Location within Bashkortostan Location within Russia
- Coordinates: 53°56′N 54°50′E
- Country: Russia
- Region: Bashkortostan
- District: Alsheyevsky District
- Time zone: UTC+5:00

Verkhneye Avryuzovo (Russian: Верхнее Аврюзово; Bashkir: Үрге Әүрез, Ürge Äwrez) is a rural locality (a village) in Nizhneavryuzovsky Selsoviet, Alsheyevsky District, Bashkortostan, Russia. The population was 99 as of 2010. There are 3 streets.

== Geography ==
Verkhneye Avryuzovo is located 29 km southwest of Rayevsky (the district's administrative centre) by road. Nizhneye Avryuzovo is the nearest rural locality.
