= Bayazitovo =

Bayazitovo Баязитово
- Village
- Location within Bashkortostan Location within Russia
- Coordinates: 54°11′N 54°45′E
- Country: Russia
- Region: Bashkortostan
- District: Alsheyevsky District
- Time zone: UTC+5:00

Bayazitovo (Russian: Баязитово; Bashkir: Баязит, Bayazit) is a rural locality (a village) in Tashlinsky Selsoviet, Alsheyevsky District, Bashkortostan, Russia. The population was 81 as of 2010. There are 2 streets.

== Geography ==
Bayazitovo is located 23 km northwest of Rayevsky (the district's administrative centre) by road. Tashtyube is the nearest rural locality.
