= Sulpan =

Sulpan Сулпан
- Village
- Location within Bashkortostan Location within Russia
- Coordinates: 53°46′N 55°17′E
- Country: Russia
- Region: Bashkortostan
- District: Alsheyevsky District
- Time zone: UTC+5:00

Sulpan (Russian: Сулпан) is a rural locality (a village) in Kysylsky Selsoviet, Alsheyevsky District, Bashkortostan, Russia. The population was 117 as of 2010. There are 5 streets.

== Geography ==
Sulpan is located 53 km southeast of Rayevsky (the district's administrative centre) by road. Tavrichanka is the nearest rural locality.
