= Truntaishevo =

Truntaishevo Трунтаишево
- Selo
- Location within Bashkortostan Location within Russia
- Coordinates: 54°05′N 54°44′E
- Country: Russia
- Region: Bashkortostan
- District: Alsheyevsky District
- Time zone: UTC+5:00

Truntaishevo (Russian: Трунтаишево; Tatar: Торынтаеш, Torıntayeş; Bashkir: Торонтайыш, Torontayış) is a rural locality (a selo) in and the administrative center of Truntaishevsky Selsoviet, Alsheyevsky District, Bashkortostan, Russia. The population was 1,034 as of 2010. There are 16 streets.

== Geography ==
Truntaishevo is located 23 km northwest of Rayevsky (the district's administrative centre) by road. Ustyevka is the nearest rural locality.
