= Novy Kipchak =

Novy Kipchak Новый Кипчак
- Village
- Location within Bashkortostan Location within Russia
- Coordinates: 53°53′N 55°05′E
- Country: Russia
- Region: Bashkortostan
- District: Alsheyevsky District
- Time zone: UTC+5:00

Novy Kipchak (Russian: Новый Кипчак; Bashkir: Яңы Ҡыпсаҡ, Yañı Qıpsaq) is a rural locality (a village) in Kipchak-Askarovsky Selsoviet, Alsheyevsky District, Bashkortostan, Russia. The population was 148 as of 2010. There are 2 streets.

== Geography ==
Novy Kipchak is located 30 km southeast of Rayevsky (the district's administrative centre) by road. Saryshevo is the nearest rural locality.
