= Tashtyube =

Tashtyube Таштюбе
- Village
- Location within Bashkortostan Location within Russia
- Coordinates: 54°11′N 54°43′E
- Country: Russia
- Region: Bashkortostan
- District: Alsheyevsky District
- Time zone: UTC+5:00

Tashtyube (Russian: Таштюбе; Bashkir: Таштүбә, Taştübä) is a rural locality (a village) in Tashlinsky Selsoviet, Alsheyevsky District, Bashkortostan, Russia. The population was 191 as of 2010. There are 3 streets.

== Geography ==
Tashtyube is located 24 km northwest of Rayevsky (the district's administrative centre) by road. Bayazitovo is the nearest rural locality.
