= Bugulminka =

Bugulminka Бугульминка
- Village
- Location within Bashkortostan Location within Russia
- Coordinates: 53°50′N 54°31′E
- Country: Russia
- Region: Bashkortostan
- District: Alsheyevsky District
- Time zone: UTC+5:00

Bugulminka (Russian: Бугульминка; Bashkir: Бөгөлмә, Bögölmä) is a rural locality (a village) in Vozdvizhensky Selsoviet, Alsheyevsky District, Bashkortostan, Russia. The population was 131 as of 2010. There are 5 streets.

== Geography ==
Bugulminka is located 43 km southwest of Rayevsky (the district's administrative centre) by road. Sanatoriya imeni Chekhova is the nearest rural locality.
