= Akberda =

Akberda Акберда Аҡбирҙе
- Village
- Location within Bashkortostan Location within Russia
- Coordinates: 54°03′N 55°00′E
- Country: Russia
- Region: Bashkortostan
- District: Alsheyevsky District
- Time zone: UTC+5:00

Akberda (Russian: Акберда, Bashkir: Аҡбирҙе, Aqbirźe) is a rural locality (a village) in Ibrayevsky Selsoviet, Alsheyevsky District, Bashkortostan, Russia. The population was 73 as of 2010. There is 1 street.

== Geography ==
Akberda is located 8 km southeast of Rayevsky (the district's administrative centre) by road. Starosepyashevo is the nearest rural locality.
