= Kazanka, Alsheyevsky District, Republic of Bashkortostan =

Kazanka Казанка
- Selo
- Location within Bashkortostan Location within Russia
- Coordinates: 54°08′N 54°48′E
- Country: Russia
- Region: Bashkortostan
- District: Alsheyevsky District
- Time zone: UTC+5:00

Kazanka (Russian: Казанка) is a rural locality (a selo) and the administrative center of Kazansky Selsoviet, Alsheyevsky District, Bashkortostan, Russia. The population was 350 as of 2010. There are 2 streets.

== Geography ==
Kazanka is located 15 km northwest of Rayevsky (the district's administrative centre) by road. Fan is the nearest rural locality.
