= Budanyar =

Budanyar Буданьяр
- Village
- Location within Bashkortostan Location within Russia
- Coordinates: 53°48′N 54°30′E
- Country: Russia
- Region: Bashkortostan
- District: Alsheyevsky District
- Time zone: UTC+5:00

Budanyar (Russian: Буданьяр; Bashkir: Буҙанъяр, Buźanyar) is a rural locality (a village) in Gayniyamaksky Selsoviet, Alsheyevsky District, Bashkortostan, Russia. The population was 40 as of 2010. There are 2 streets.

== Geography ==
Budanyar is located 58 km southwest of Rayevsky (the district's administrative centre) by road. Gayniyamak is the nearest rural locality.
