= Shafranovo =

Shafranovo Шафраново
- Selo
- Location within Bashkortostan Location within Russia
- Coordinates: 53°58′N 54°46′E
- Country: Russia
- Region: Bashkortostan
- District: Alsheyevsky District
- Time zone: UTC+5:00

Shafranovo (Russian: Шафраново; Bashkir: Шафран, Şafran) is a rural locality (a selo) and the administrative center of Shafranovsky Selsoviet, Alsheyevsky District, Bashkortostan, Russia. The population was 2,362 as of 2010. There are 36 streets.

== Geography ==
Shafranovo is located 18 km southwest of Rayevsky (the district's administrative centre) by road. Churakayevo is the nearest rural locality.
