= Tashly =

Tashly Ташлы
- Selo
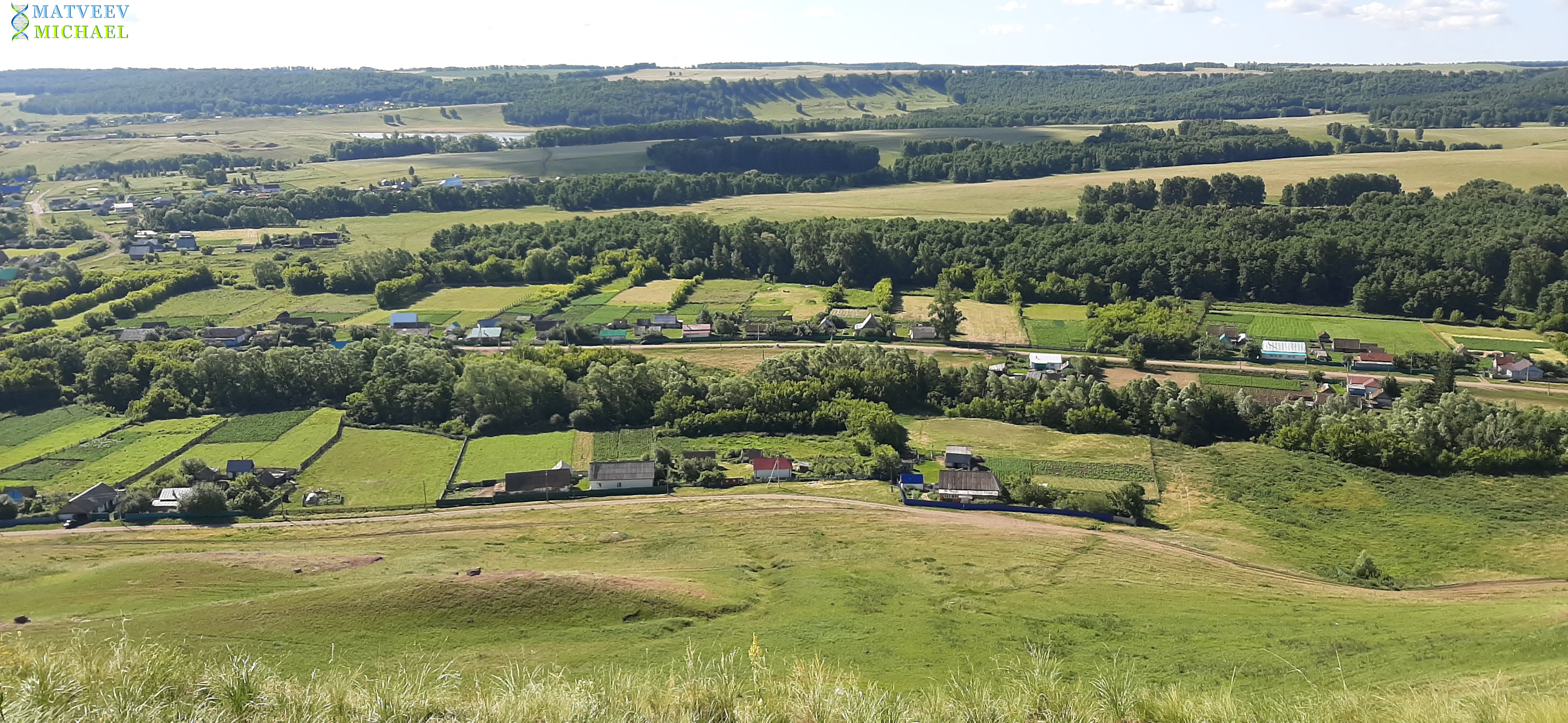

- Location within Bashkortostan Location within Russia
- Coordinates: 54°10′N 54°41′E
- Country: Russia
- Region: Bashkortostan
- District: Alsheyevsky District
- Time zone: UTC+5:00

Tashly (Russian: Ташлы; Bashkir: Ташлы, Taşlı) is a rural locality (a selo) and the administrative center of Tashlinsky Selsoviet, Alsheyevsky District, Bashkortostan, Russia. The population was 454 as of 2010. There are 8 streets.

== Geography ==
Tashly is located 27 km northwest of Rayevsky (the district's administrative centre) by road. Tashtyube is the nearest rural locality.
