= Irik =

Irik Ирик
- Village
- Location within Bashkortostan Location within Russia
- Coordinates: 54°05′N 54°35′E
- Country: Russia
- Region: Bashkortostan
- District: Alsheyevsky District
- Time zone: UTC+5:00

Irik (Russian: Ирик; Bashkir: Ирек, İrek) is a rural locality (a village) in Truntaishevsky Selsoviet, Alsheyevsky District, Bashkortostan, Russia. The population was 16 as of 2010. There are 3 streets.

== Geography ==
Irik is located 35 km west of Rayevsky (the district's administrative centre) by road. Sarayevo is the nearest rural locality.
