= Samodurovka =

Samodurovka Самодуровка
- Village
- Location within Bashkortostan Location within Russia
- Coordinates: 53°53′N 54°34′E
- Country: Russia
- Region: Bashkortostan
- District: Alsheyevsky District
- Time zone: UTC+5:00

Samodurovka (Russian: Самодуровка) is a rural locality (a village) in Vozdvizhensky Selsoviet, Alsheyevsky District, Bashkortostan, Russia. The population was 18 as of 2010. There is 1 street.

== Geography ==
Samodurovka is located 37 km southwest of Rayevsky (the district's administrative centre) by road. Aksyonovo is the nearest rural locality.
