= Idrisovo =

Idrisovo Идрисово
- Village
- Location within Bashkortostan Location within Russia
- Coordinates: 54°01′N 54°51′E
- Country: Russia
- Region: Bashkortostan
- District: Alsheyevsky District
- Time zone: UTC+5:00

Idrisovo (Russian: Идрисово; Bashkir: Иҙрис, İźris) is a rural locality (a village) in Shafranovsky Selsoviet, Alsheyevsky District, Bashkortostan, Russia. The population was 389 as of 2010. There are 10 streets.

== Geography ==
Idrisovo is located 10 km southwest of Rayevsky (the district's administrative centre) by road. Uvarovka is the nearest rural locality.
