= Khanzharovo =

Khanzharovo Ханжарово
- Village
- Location within Bashkortostan Location within Russia
- Coordinates: 53°56′N 54°36′E
- Country: Russia
- Region: Bashkortostan
- District: Alsheyevsky District
- Time zone: UTC+5:00

Khanzharovo (Russian: Ханжарово; Bashkir: Хәнйәр, Xänyär) is a rural locality (a village) in Aksyonovsky Selsoviet, Alsheyevsky District, Bashkortostan, Russia. The population was 226 as of 2010. There are 3 streets.

== Geography ==
Khanzharovo is located 31 km southwest of Rayevsky (the district's administrative centre) by road. Bikchagul is the nearest rural locality.
