= Neforoshchanka =

Neforoshchanka Нефорощанка
- Selo
- Location within Bashkortostan Location within Russia
- Coordinates: 53°58′N 55°26′E
- Country: Russia
- Region: Bashkortostan
- District: Alsheyevsky District
- Time zone: UTC+5:00

Neforoshchanka (Russian: Нефорощанка; Bashkir: Нефороща, Neforoşça) is a rural locality (a selo) in Nigmatullinsky Selsoviet, Alsheyevsky District, Bashkortostan, Russia. The population was 173 as of 2010. There are 2 streets.

== Geography ==
Neforoshchanka is located 48 km southeast of Rayevsky (the district's administrative centre) by road. Belyakovka is the nearest rural locality.
