= Nizhneye Avryuzovo =

Nizhneye Avryuzovo Нижнее Аврюзово
- Selo
- Location within Bashkortostan Location within Russia
- Coordinates: 53°55′N 54°53′E
- Country: Russia
- Region: Bashkortostan
- District: Alsheyevsky District
- Time zone: UTC+5:00

Nizhneye Avryuzovo (Russian: Нижнее Аврюзово; Bashkir: Түбәнге Әүрез, Tübänge Äwrez) is a rural locality (a selo) and the administrative center of Nizhneavryuzovsky Selsoviet, Alsheyevsky District, Bashkortostan, Russia. The population was 683 as of 2010. There are 9 streets.

== Geography ==
Nizhneye Avryuzovo is located 24 km south of Rayevsky (the district's administrative centre) by road. Mechnikovo is the nearest rural locality.
