= Dim, Alsheyevsky District, Republic of Bashkortostan =

Dim Дим
- Selo
- Location within Bashkortostan Location within Russia
- Coordinates: 53°57′N 54°58′E
- Country: Russia
- Region: Bashkortostan
- District: Alsheyevsky District
- Time zone: UTC+5:00

Dim (Russian and Bashkir: Дим) is a rural locality (a selo) in Karmyshevsky Selsoviet, Alsheyevsky District, Bashkortostan, Russia. The population was 278 as of 2010. There are 3 streets.

== Geography ==
Dim is located 14 km south of Rayevsky (the district's administrative centre) by road. Avryuztamak is the nearest rural locality.
