= Irshat =

Irshat Иршат
- Village
- Location within Bashkortostan Location within Russia
- Coordinates: 53°49′N 54°32′E
- Country: Russia
- Region: Bashkortostan
- District: Alsheyevsky District
- Time zone: UTC+5:00

Irshat (Russian: Иршат; Bashkir: Иршат, İrşat) is a rural locality (a village) in Gayniyamaksky Selsoviet, Alsheyevsky District, Bashkortostan, Russia. The population was 68 as of 2010. There is 1 street.

== Geography ==
Irshat is located 45 km southwest of Rayevsky (the district's administrative centre) by road. Stepanovka is the nearest rural locality.
