= Tukmakbash =

Tukmakbash Тукмакбаш
- Village
- Location within Bashkortostan Location within Russia
- Coordinates: 53°45′N 54°33′E
- Country: Russia
- Region: Bashkortostan
- District: Alsheyevsky District
- Time zone: UTC+5:00

Tukmakbash (Russian: Тукмакбаш; Bashkir: Туҡмаҡбаш, Tuqmaqbaş) is a rural locality (a village) in Gayniyamaksky Selsoviet, Alsheyevsky District, Bashkortostan, Russia. The population was 55 as of 2010. There is 1 street.

== Geography ==
Tukmakbash is located 57 km southwest of Rayevsky (the district's administrative centre) by road. Ikhtisad is the nearest rural locality.
