= Maloakkulayevo =

Maloakkulayevo Малоаккулаево
- Village
- Location within Bashkortostan Location within Russia
- Coordinates: 54°06′N 54°58′E
- Country: Russia
- Region: Bashkortostan
- District: Alsheyevsky District
- Time zone: UTC+5:00

Maloakkulayevo (Russian: Малоаккулаево; Bashkir: Бәләкәй Аҡҡолай, Bäläkäy Aqqolay) is a rural locality (a village) in Kazansky Selsoviet, Alsheyevsky District, Bashkortostan, Russia. The population was 183 as of 2010. There are 2 streets.

== Geography ==
Maloakkulayevo is located 7 km north of Rayevsky (the district's administrative centre) by road. Staroakkulayevo is the nearest rural locality.
