= Khrustalevo =

Khrustalevo Хрусталево
- Village
- Location within Bashkortostan Location within Russia
- Coordinates: 54°02′N 54°37′E
- Country: Russia
- Region: Bashkortostan
- District: Alsheyevsky District
- Time zone: UTC+5:00

Khrustalevo (Russian: Хрусталево; Bashkir: Хрустали, Xrustali) is a rural locality (a village) in Truntaishevsky Selsoviet, Alsheyevsky District, Bashkortostan, Russia. The population was 62 as of 2010. There are 4 streets.

== Geography ==
Khrustalevo is located 35 km west of Rayevsky (the district's administrative centre) by road. Sarayevo is the nearest rural locality.
