= Ustyevka =

Ustyevka Устьевка
- Village
- Location within Bashkortostan Location within Russia
- Coordinates: 54°07′N 54°40′E
- Country: Russia
- Region: Bashkortostan
- District: Alsheyevsky District
- Time zone: UTC+5:00

Ustyevka (Russian: Устьевка) is a rural locality (a village) in Truntaishevsky Selsoviet, Alsheyevsky District, Bashkortostan, Russia. The population was 7 as of 2010. There is 1 street.

== Geography ==
Ustyevka is located 27 km northwest of Rayevsky (the district's administrative centre) by road. Adamovka is the nearest rural locality.
