= Krasny Klin =

Krasny Klin Красный Клин
- Village
- Location within Bashkortostan Location within Russia
- Coordinates: 53°53′N 55°14′E
- Country: Russia
- Region: Bashkortostan
- District: Alsheyevsky District
- Time zone: UTC+5:00

Krasny Klin (Russian: Красный Клин) is a rural locality (a village) in Zelenoklinovsky Selsoviet, Alsheyevsky District, Bashkortostan, Russia. The population was 238 as of 2010. There are 2 streets.

== Geography ==
Krasny Klin is located 36 km southeast of Rayevsky (the district's administrative centre) by road. Abdulkarimovo is the nearest rural locality.
