= Uvarovka, Alsheyevsky District, Republic of Bashkortostan =

Uvarovka Уваровка
- Village
- Location within Bashkortostan Location within Russia
- Coordinates: 53°59′N 54°52′E
- Country: Russia
- Region: Bashkortostan
- District: Alsheyevsky District
- Time zone: UTC+5:00

Uvarovka (Russian: Уваровка) is a rural locality (a village) in Karmyshevsky Selsoviet, Alsheyevsky District, Bashkortostan, Russia. The population was 110 as of 2010. There is 1 street.

== Geography ==
Uvarovka is located 12 km southwest of Rayevsky (the district's administrative centre) by road. Grigoryevka is the nearest rural locality.
