= Novovozdvizhenka =

Novovozdvizhenka Нововоздвиженка
- Village
- Location within Bashkortostan Location within Russia
- Coordinates: 53°53′N 54°29′E
- Country: Russia
- Region: Bashkortostan
- District: Alsheyevsky District
- Time zone: UTC+5:00

Novovozdvizhenka (Russian: Нововоздвиженка; Bashkir: Яңы Воздвиженка, Yañı Vozdvijenka) is a rural locality (a village) in Vozdvizhensky Selsoviet, Alsheyevsky District, Bashkortostan, Russia. The population was 9 as of 2010. There is 1 street.

== Geography ==
Novovozdvizhenka is located 41 km southwest of Rayevsky (the district's administrative centre) by road. Chelnokovka is the nearest rural locality.
