= Aldarovo =

Aldarovo Алдарово Алдар
- Village
- Location within Bashkortostan Location within Russia
- Coordinates: 53°50′N 54°48′E
- Country: Russia
- Region: Bashkortostan
- District: Alsheyevsky District
- Time zone: UTC+5:00

Aldarovo (Russian: Алдарово, Bashkir: Алдар, Aldar) is a rural locality (a village) in Nikifarovsky Selsoviet, Alsheyevsky District, Bashkortostan, Russia. The population was 105 as of 2010. There are 3 streets.

== Geography ==
Aldarovo is located 55 km southwest of Rayevsky (the district's administrative centre) by road. Balgazy is the nearest rural locality.
