= Aydagulovo =

Aydagulovo Айдагулово
- Village
- Location within Bashkortostan Location within Russia
- Coordinates: 53°51′N 54°38′E
- Country: Russia
- Region: Bashkortostan
- District: Alsheyevsky District
- Time zone: UTC+5:00

Aydagulovo (Russian: Айдагулово; Bashkir: Айҙағол, Ayźağol) is a rural locality (a village) in Nikifarovsky Selsoviet, Alsheyevsky District, Bashkortostan, Russia. The population was 72 as of 2010. There is 1 street.

== Geography ==
Aydagulovo is located 40 km southwest of Rayevsky (the district's administrative centre) by road. Nikifarovo is the nearest rural locality.
