= Selo sanatoriya imeni Chekhova =

Selo sanatoriya imeni Chekhova Село санатория имени Чехова
- Selo
- Location within Bashkortostan Location within Russia
- Coordinates: 53°50′N 54°31′E
- Country: Russia
- Region: Bashkortostan
- District: Alsheyevsky District
- Time zone: UTC+5:00

Selo sanatoriya imeni Chekhova (Russian: Село санатория имени Чехова; Bashkir: Чехов А.П. исемендәге шифахана ауылы, Çexov A.P. isemedäge şifaxana awılı) is a rural locality (a selo) in Vozdvizhensky Selsoviet, Alsheyevsky District, Bashkortostan, Russia. The population was 168 as of 2010. There are 5 streets.

== Geography ==
It is located 44 km southwest of Rayevsky (the district's administrative centre) by road. Bugulminka is the nearest rural locality.
