= Tashkichu =

Tashkichu Ташкичу
- Village
- Location within Bashkortostan Location within Russia
- Coordinates: 54°03′N 54°48′E
- Country: Russia
- Region: Bashkortostan
- District: Alsheyevsky District
- Time zone: UTC+5:00

Tashkichu (Russian: Ташкичу; Bashkir: Ташкисеү, Taşkisew) is a rural locality (a village) in Shafranovsky Selsoviet, Alsheyevsky District, Bashkortostan, Russia. The population was 92 as of 2010. There are 3 streets.

== Geography ==
Tashkichu is located 25 km west of Rayevsky (the district's administrative centre) by road. Karan is the nearest rural locality.
