= Chebenli =

Chebenli Чебенли
- Selo
- Location within Bashkortostan Location within Russia
- Coordinates: 53°51′N 55°00′E
- Country: Russia
- Region: Bashkortostan
- District: Alsheyevsky District
- Time zone: UTC+05:00

Chebenli (Russian: Чебенли; Bashkir: Себенле, Sebenle) is a rural locality (a selo) and the administrative center of Chebenlinsky Selsoviet, Alsheyevsky District, Bashkortostan, Russia. The population was 290 as of 2010.

== Geography ==
Chebenli is located 30 km south of Rayevsky (the district's administrative centre) by road. Tyubeteyevo is the nearest rural locality.
