= Mikhaylovka (selo), Alsheyevsky District, Republic of Bashkortostan =

Mikhaylovka Михайловка
- Selo
- Location within Bashkortostan Location within Russia
- Coordinates: 53°54′N 54°55′E
- Country: Russia
- Region: Bashkortostan
- District: Alsheyevsky District
- Time zone: UTC+5:00

Mikhaylovka (Russian: Михайловка) is a rural locality (a selo) in Karmyshevsky Selsoviet, Alsheyevsky District, Bashkortostan, Russia. The population was 89 as of 2010. There are 2 streets.

== Geography ==
Mikhaylovka is located 35 km northwest of Rayevsky (the district's administrative centre) by road.
