= Yartashly =

Yartashly Ярташлы
- Village
- Location within Bashkortostan Location within Russia
- Coordinates: 53°43′N 55°14′E
- Country: Russia
- Region: Bashkortostan
- District: Alsheyevsky District
- Time zone: UTC+5:00

Yartashly (Russian: Ярташлы; Bashkir: Ярташлы, Yartaşlı) is a rural locality (a village) in Kysylsky Selsoviet, Alsheyevsky District, Bashkortostan, Russia. The population was 199 as of 2010. There are 4 streets.

== Geography ==
Yartashly is located 60 km southeast of Rayevsky (the district's administrative centre) by road. Zaypekul is the nearest rural locality.
