= Maloabdrashitovo =

Maloabdrashitovo Малоабдрашитово
- Village
- Location within Bashkortostan Location within Russia
- Coordinates: 54°02′N 55°14′E
- Country: Russia
- Region: Bashkortostan
- District: Alsheyevsky District
- Time zone: UTC+5:00

Maloabdrashitovo (Russian: Малоабдрашитово; Bashkir: Бәләкәй Әбдрәшит, Bäläkäy Äbdräşit) is a rural locality (a village) in Abdrashitovsky Selsoviet, Alsheyevsky District, Bashkortostan, Russia. As of 2010, the population was 42. There is only 1 street.

== Geography ==
Maloabdrashitovo is located 25 km east of Rayevsky (the district's administrative centre) by road. Krymsky is the nearest rural locality.
