= Staroakkulayevo =

Staroakkulayevo Староаккулаево
- Village
- Location within Bashkortostan Location within Russia
- Coordinates: 54°07′N 54°58′E
- Country: Russia
- Region: Bashkortostan
- District: Alsheyevsky District
- Time zone: UTC+5:00

Staroakkulayevo (Russian: Староаккулаево; Bashkir: Иҫке Аҡҡолай, İśke Aqqolay) is a rural locality (a village) in Kazansky Selsoviet, Alsheyevsky District, Bashkortostan, Russia. The population was 232 as of 2010. There are 3 streets.

== Geography ==
Staroakkulayevo is located 8 km north of Rayevsky (the district's administrative centre) by road. Novoakkulayevo is the nearest rural locality.
