= Karmyshevo =

Karmyshevo Кармышево
- Selo
- Location within Bashkortostan Location within Russia
- Coordinates: 54°01′N 54°58′E
- Country: Russia
- Region: Bashkortostan
- District: Alsheyevsky District
- Time zone: UTC+5:00

Karmyshevo (Russian: Кармышево; Bashkir: Ҡармыш, Qarmış) is a rural locality (a selo) and the administrative center of Karmyshevsky Selsoviet, Alsheyevsky District, Bashkortostan, Russia. The population was 651 as of 2010. There are 7 streets.

== Geography ==
Karmyshevo is located 6 km southeast of Rayevsky (the district's administrative centre) by road. Churayevo is the nearest rural locality.
