= Krasnaya Zvezda, Republic of Bashkortostan =

Krasnaya Zvezda Красная Звезда
- Village
- Location within Bashkortostan Location within Russia
- Coordinates: 54°02′N 55°17′E
- Country: Russia
- Region: Bashkortostan
- District: Alsheyevsky District
- Time zone: UTC+5:00

Krasnaya Zvezda (Russian: Красная Звезда) is a rural locality (a village) in Abdrashitovsky Selsoviet, Alsheyevsky District, Bashkortostan, Russia. The population was 56 as of 2010. There are 2 streets.

== Geography ==
Krasnaya Zvezda is located 28 km east of Rayevsky (the district's administrative centre) by road. Sartbash is the nearest rural locality.
