= Urnyak, Republic of Bashkortostan =

Urnyak Урняк
- Selo
- Location within Bashkortostan Location within Russia
- Coordinates: 54°10′N 54°45′E
- Country: Russia
- Region: Bashkortostan
- District: Alsheyevsky District
- Time zone: UTC+5:00

Urnyak (Russian: Урняк; Bashkir: Үрнәк, Ürnäk) is a rural locality (a selo) in Kazansky Selsoviet, Alsheyevsky District, Bashkortostan, Russia. The population was 149 as of 2010. There are 3 streets.

== Geography ==
Urnyak is located 20 km northwest of Rayevsky (the district's administrative centre) by road. Bayazitovo is the nearest rural locality.
