= Urnyak =

Urnyak may refer to:

- Urnyak, Republic of Bashkortostan, a village (selo) in the Republic of Bashkortostan, Russia
- Urnyak, Arsky District, Republic of Tatarstan, a settlement in Arsky District of the Republic of Tatarstan, Russia
- Urnyak, Nurlatsky District, Republic of Tatarstan, a village in Nurlatsky District of the Republic of Tatarstan, Russia
