= Rayevsky (rural locality) =

Rayevsky Раевский
- Selo

Other transcription(s)
  - Bashkir: Раевка
- Interactive map of Rayevsky
- Location of Rayevsky Rayevsky (Bashkortostan)
- Coordinates: 54°03′59″N 54°56′09″E
- Country: Russia
- Federal subject: Bashkortostan
- Administrative district: Alsheyevsky District
- SelsovietSelsoviet: Rayevsky Selsoviet
- Founded: 1890
- Elevation: 115 m (377 ft)

Population (2010 Census)
  - Total: 19,557
  - Estimate (2021): 18,698 (−4.4%)

Administrative status
  - Capital of: Alsheyevsky District, Rayevsky Selsoviet

Municipal status
  - Municipal district: Alsheyevsky Municipal District
  - Rural settlement: Rayevsky Selsoviet Rural Settlement
  - Capital of: Alsheyevsky Municipal District, Rayevsky Selsoviet Rural Settlement
- Time zone: UTC+5 (MSK+2)
- Postal code: 452120
- OKTMO ID: 80602451101

Rayevsky (Russian: Раевский, Bashkir: Раевка, Rayevka) is a rural locality (a selo) and the administrative center of Alsheyevsky District of the Republic of Bashkortostan, Russia. Population: 19,557 (2010 census); 20,022 (2002 census); 17,750 (1989 Soviet census).

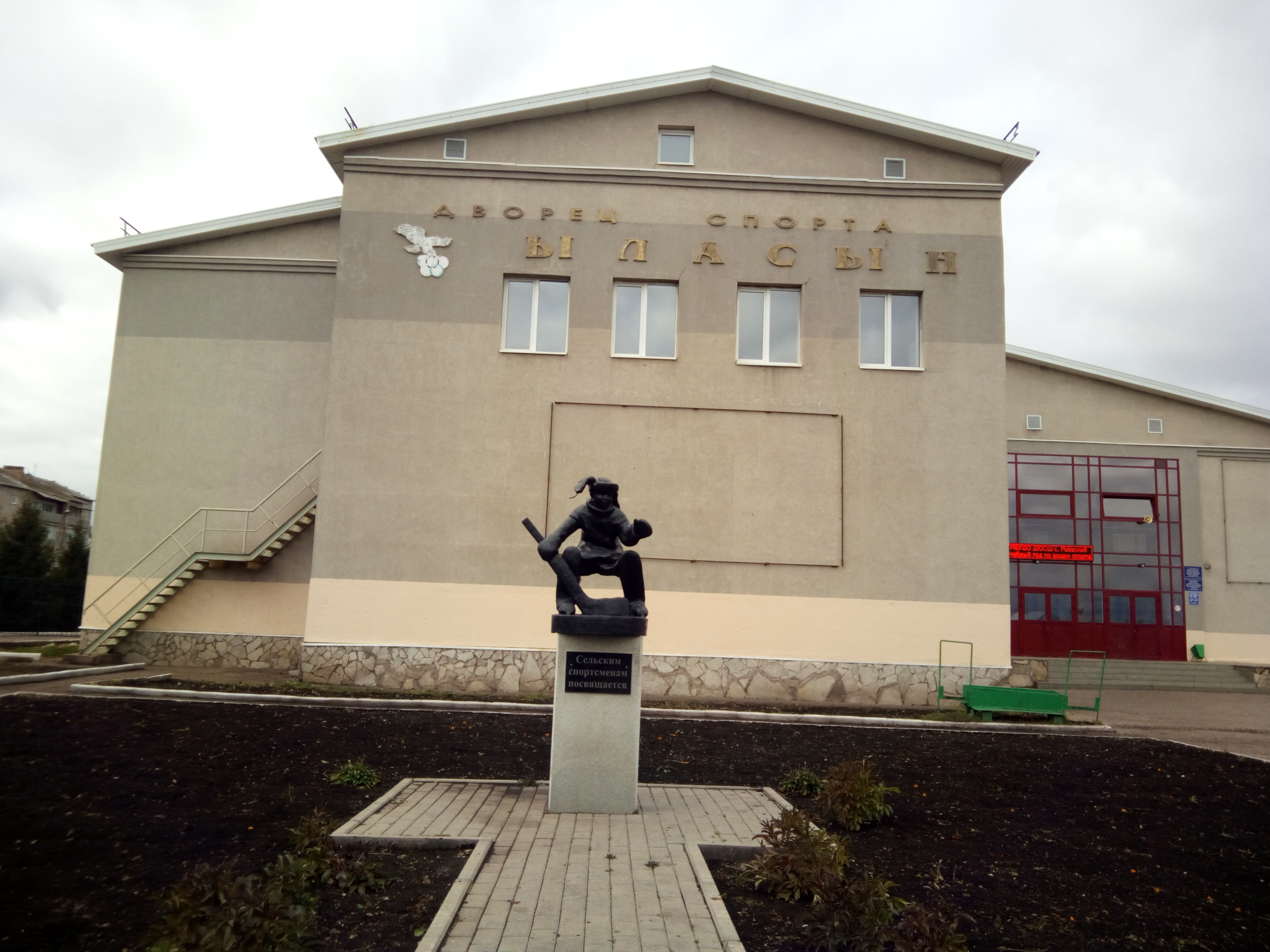
Sports Palace "Ilasyn"
