= Alsheyevsky District =

Alsheyevsky District Альшеевский район (Russian)
- District

Other transcription(s)
  - Bashkir: Әлшәй районы
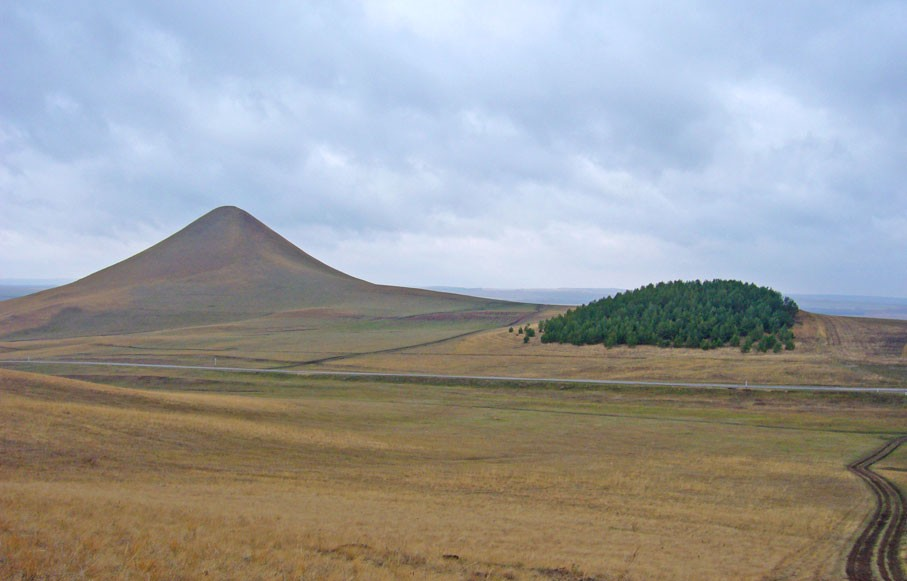
- Susak-Tau, in Alsheyevsky District

- Flag Coat of arms
- Location of Alsheyevsky District in the Republic of Bashkortostan
- Coordinates: 54°01′N 54°57′E
- Country: Russia
- Federal subject: Republic of Bashkortostan
- Established: January 31, 1935
- Administrative center: Rayevsky

Area
  - Total: 2,415 km^{2} (932 sq mi)

Population
  - Estimate (2021): 36,799
  - Urban: 0%
  - Rural: 100%

Administrative structure
  - Administrative divisions: 20 Selsoviets
  - Inhabited localities: 104 rural localities

Municipal structure
  - Municipally incorporated as: Alsheyevsky Municipal District
  - Municipal divisions: 0 urban settlements, 20 rural settlements
- Time zone: UTC+5 (MSK+2)
- OKTMO ID: 80602000
- Website: http://www.alshei.ru/

Population of Alsheyevsky District
- 2010 Census: 43,647
- 2002 Census: 43,262
- 1989 Census: 39,524
- 1979 Census: 52,162

Alsheyevsky District (Russian: Альше́евский райо́н; Bashkir and Tatar: Әлшәй районы, Älşäy rayonı) is an administrative and municipal district (raion), one of the fifty-four in the Republic of Bashkortostan, Russia. It is located in the west of the republic. The area of the district is 2,415 square kilometers (932 sq mi). Its administrative center is the rural locality (a selo) of Rayevsky. As of the 2021 Russian census, Alsheyevsky District has a population of 36,799.

== History ==
The district was established on January 31, 1935.

== Geography ==
Alsheyevsky District borders Davlekanovsky District to the north, Belebeyevsky District to the west, Bizhbulyaksky District to the southwest, Miyakinsky District to the south, and Sterlitamaksky District and Aurgazinsky District to the east.

== Administrative and municipal status ==
Within the framework of administrative divisions, Alsheyevsky District is one of the fifty-four in the Republic of Bashkortostan. The district is divided into 20 selsoviets, comprising 104 rural localities. As a municipal division, the district is incorporated as Alsheyevsky Municipal District. Its twenty selsoviets are incorporated as twenty rural settlements within the municipal district. The selo of Rayevsky serves as the administrative center of both the administrative and municipal districts.

== Demographics ==
As of the 2021 Russian census, Alsheyevsky District has a population of 36,799. 17,538 people (47.66% of the total population) identified as male, while 19,261 (52.34%) identified as female. 100% of the population was classified as living in rural areas.

As of the 2010 Census, the total population of the district was 43,647, with the population of Rayevsky accounting for 44.8% of that number.

2021 Russian census ethnicity data
Ethnic group	Population	Percentage
Bashkir	14,717	39.99%
Tatar	10,717	29.12%
Russian	9,588	26.06%
Chuvash	412	1.12%
Ukrainian	271	0.74%
Others	612	1.66%
Refused to identify	482	1.31%
